= Between the Crusades, 1149–1189 =

Between the Second and Third crusades

- Part of the Crusades
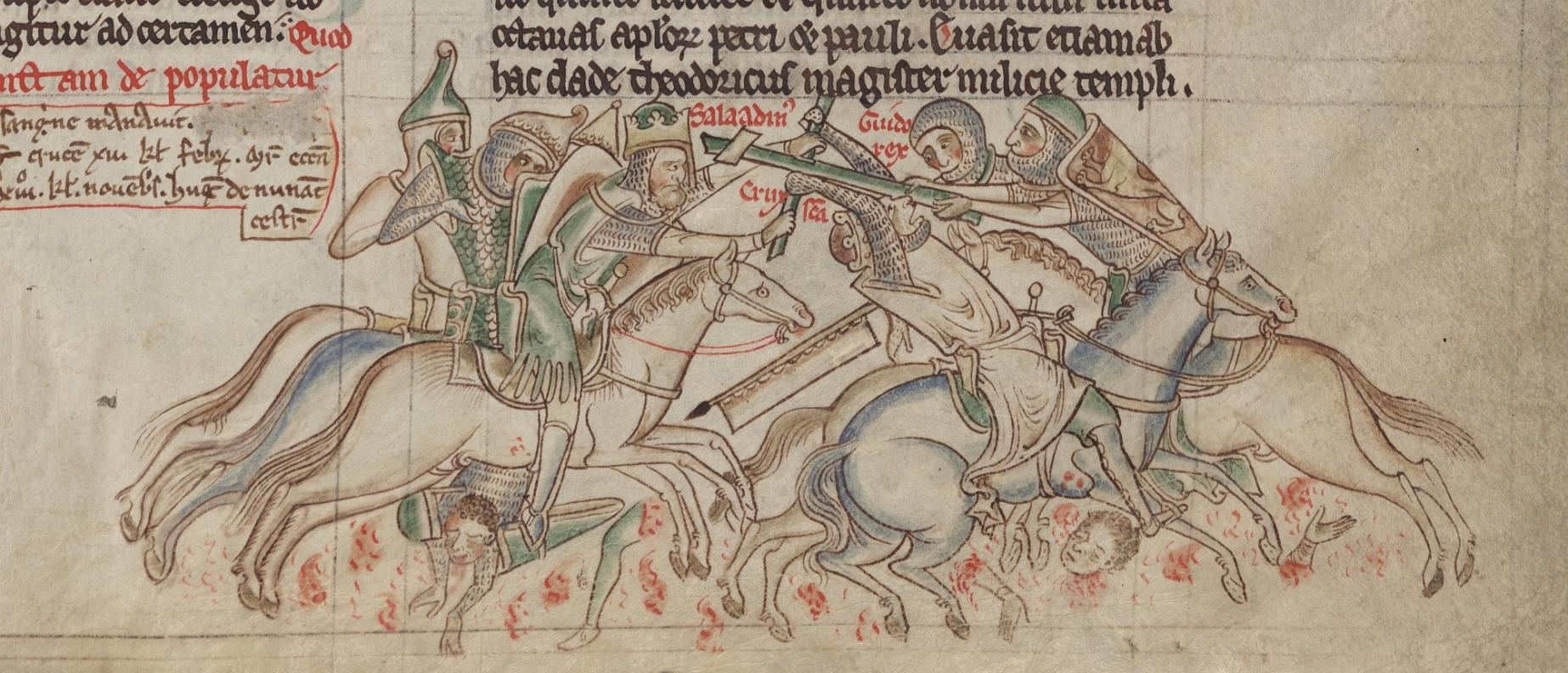
- The Battle of Hattin, from 13th-century Chronica Majora depicting the capture of the True Cross.
Date	1148–1187
Location	Kingdom of Jerusalem, Egypt, Syria
Result	Ayyubid victory

Belligerents
Kings of Jerusalem; Baldwin III; Melisende of Jerusalem; Almaric; Baldwin IV; Baldwin V Sibylla of Jerusalem; Guy of Lusignan	Zengid dynasty Zengi; Nur al-Din; Sayf al-Din I Ayyubid sultanate Saladin; Al-Adil; Turan-Shah

Commanders and leaders
Kingdom of Jerusalem; Balian of Ibelin; Humphrey II of Toron; Humphrey IV of Toron; Aimery of Lusignan; Reginald of Sidon; Hugh of Ibelin; Maurice of Montreal; Walter of Saint-Omer; Miles of Plancy; Baldwin of Ibelin; William Longsword; Reginald Grenier; Patriarchs; Fulcher of Angoulême; Aimery of Limoges; Heraclius; Adventurers; Thierry of Flanders; Hugh VIII of Lusignan; Philip I of Flanders; Transjordan; Raynald of Châtillon; Stephanie of Milly; County of Edessa; Joscelin II of Edessa; Beatrice of Saone; Baldwin of Marash; Joscelin III of Courtenay; Principality of Antioch; Raymond of Antioch; Reynald of Marash; Constance of Antioch; Bohemond III of Antioch; Raynald of Saint-Valery; County of Tripoli; Raymond II of Tripoli; Raymond III of Tripoli; Hugh III Embriaco; Galilee; Hugh II of Saint-Omer; Eschiva of Bures; Tyre; Conrad of Montferrat; Isabella of Jerusalem; Joscius of Tyre; Knights Templar; Bernard de Tremelay; Philip of Milly; Bertrand de Blanchefort; Odo of St Amand; Gilbert de Lacy; Gerard of Ridefort; Knights Hospitaller; Raymond du Puy; Gilbert of Assailly; Roger de Moulins; Armengol de Aspa	Abbasid caliphs al-Mustanjid; Al-Mustadi al-Nasir; Fatimid Egypt al-Adid; Shawar; Dirgham; Shirkuh; Ayyubids; Keukbori; Taqi al-Din; Al-Afdal ibn Salah ad-Din; Baha al-Din Qaraqush; Sharaf al-Din Qaraqush; Nasir ad-Din ibn Shirkuh; Damascus; Mujir ad-Din Abaq; Mu'in ad-Din Unur; Ismat ad-Din Khatun; Altuntash; Ayyub ibn Shādhi ibn al-Muqaddam; Turan-Shah; Faruk-Shah; Aleppo; As-Salih Ismail al-Malik; Gümüshtekin; Sayf al-Din Ghazi II; Imad ad-Din Zengi II; Mosul; Qutb al-Din Mawdud; Izz al-Din Mas'ud; Seljuks/Artuqids; Mesud I Kara Arslan; Timurtash; Kilij Arslan II; Nur ad-Din _____________________; Byzantine Empire; Manuel I Komnenos; A. Kontostephanos; Andronikos I Komnenos; Assassins; Ali ibn-Wafa; Rashid ad-Din Sinan; Armenian Cilicia; Thoros II; Constantine Kalamanos; Roupen III; Kingdom of Sicily; Tancred of Lecce; William II of Sicily; Margaritus of Brindisi

The period between the end of the Second Crusade in 1149 and the beginning of the Third Crusade in 1189 saw the Kingdom of Jerusalem and other Crusader states be reduced from a vibrant presence in the Holy Land to just a few cities and castles. Beginning with the conquests of Zengi, followed by those of his son Nur al-Din and then Saladin, the unthinkable happened, with Jerusalem falling to Muslim forces. The Frankish presence in the Levant, limited to the cities of Tyre, Tripoli and Antioch, caused a call to arms in the West for the reconquest of the Holy Land through a new crusade.

When Zengi led his army to cause the fall of Edessa in 1144, he started a movement that would unite the Muslims in the Levant against the Frankish presence. This movement grew through Nur al-Din's creation of a Syrian-Egyptian condominium that was finalized by Saladin's declaration of being the sultan of Egypt and Syria. The seminal conflict between Islam and Christianity was seen at the 1187 Battle of Hattin from which the fall of Jerusalem was preordained. The West would respond with the Third Crusade.

== Political background ==
The events after the Second Crusade that led to the Third Crusade were overwhelmingly shaped by the leaders of Muslim Syria and Egypt, as well as the rulers of the Kingdom of Jerusalem. In addition, key players included the Byzantine emperors and commanders, princes, counts and lords of Outremer, the knights of the military orders, and emirs of Muslim towns and cities.

=== Islamic rulers ===
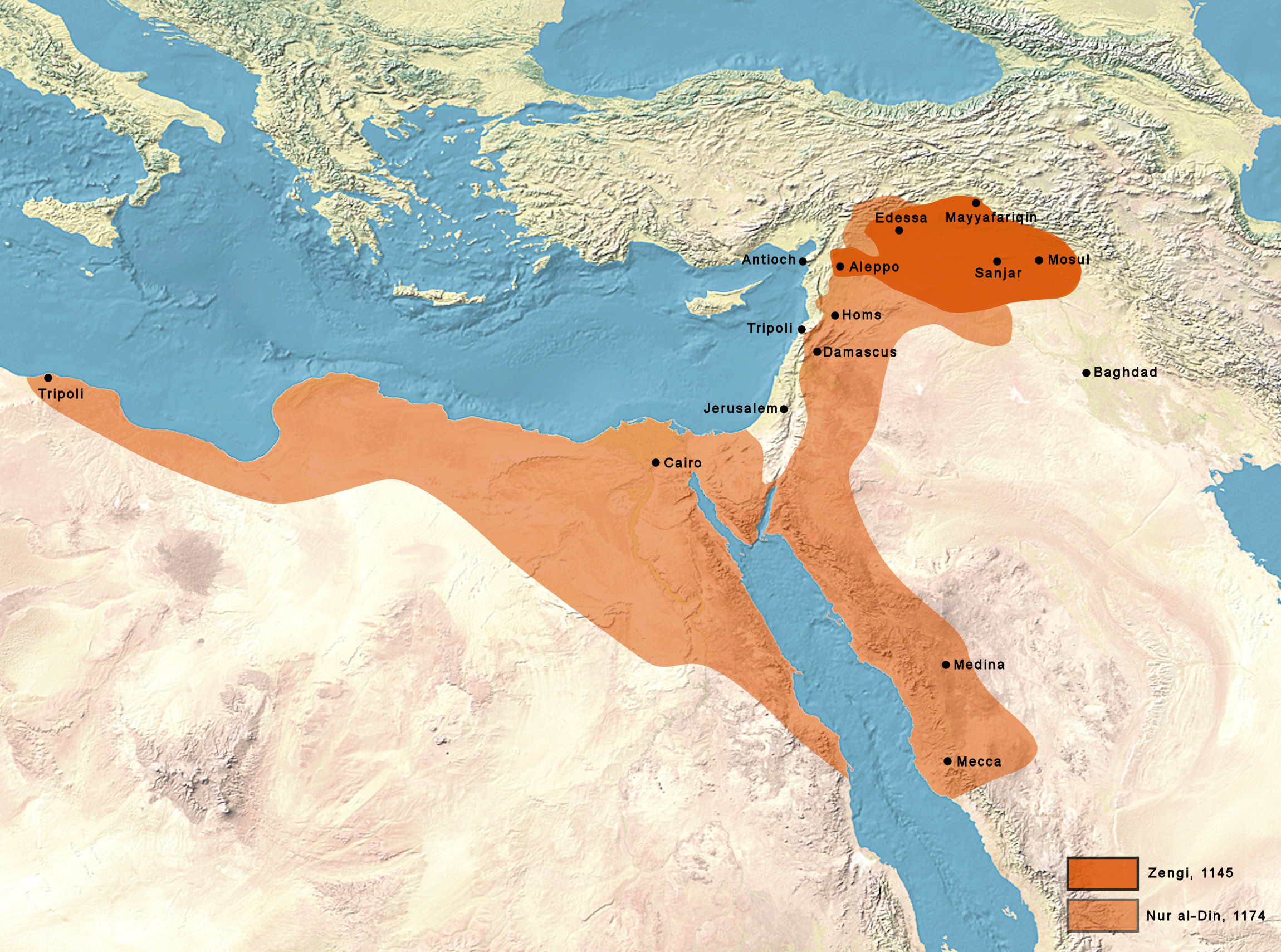
The Zengid state under Zengi in 1145, and expansion under Nur al-Din in 1174.

After the success of the First Crusade, the Kingdom of Jerusalem and other Crusader states engaged in smaller confrontations with Islamic forces in the Levant but did not face a well-organized, consolidated enemy for nearly fifty years. That changed with the rise of three powerful leaders: Imad al-Din Zengi, his son Nur al-Din, and a Kurd in service of the latter, Saladin.

The Seljuk Zengi first came to prominence in 1127 when he was named atabeg of Mosul, and then of Aleppo the next year. Zengi practiced the politics of jihad against the Latin settlements beginning with the Battle of Ba'rin in 1137 and culminating with the successful Siege of Edessa in December 1144 which triggered the Second Crusade. Zengi was assassinated in 1146, and was the founder of the eponymous Zengid dynasty.

Zengi was succeeded by his eldest son Sayf al-Din Ghazi I in Mosul, and in Aleppo by his second son Nur al-Din. When Sayf died in 1149, he was succeeded in Mosul by a third son Qutb al-Din Mawdud. Nur al-Din would consolidate Zengid power in Mesopotamia and the Levant, maintaining constant military pressure on the Crusader states. He would later conquer Egypt from the Fatimids.

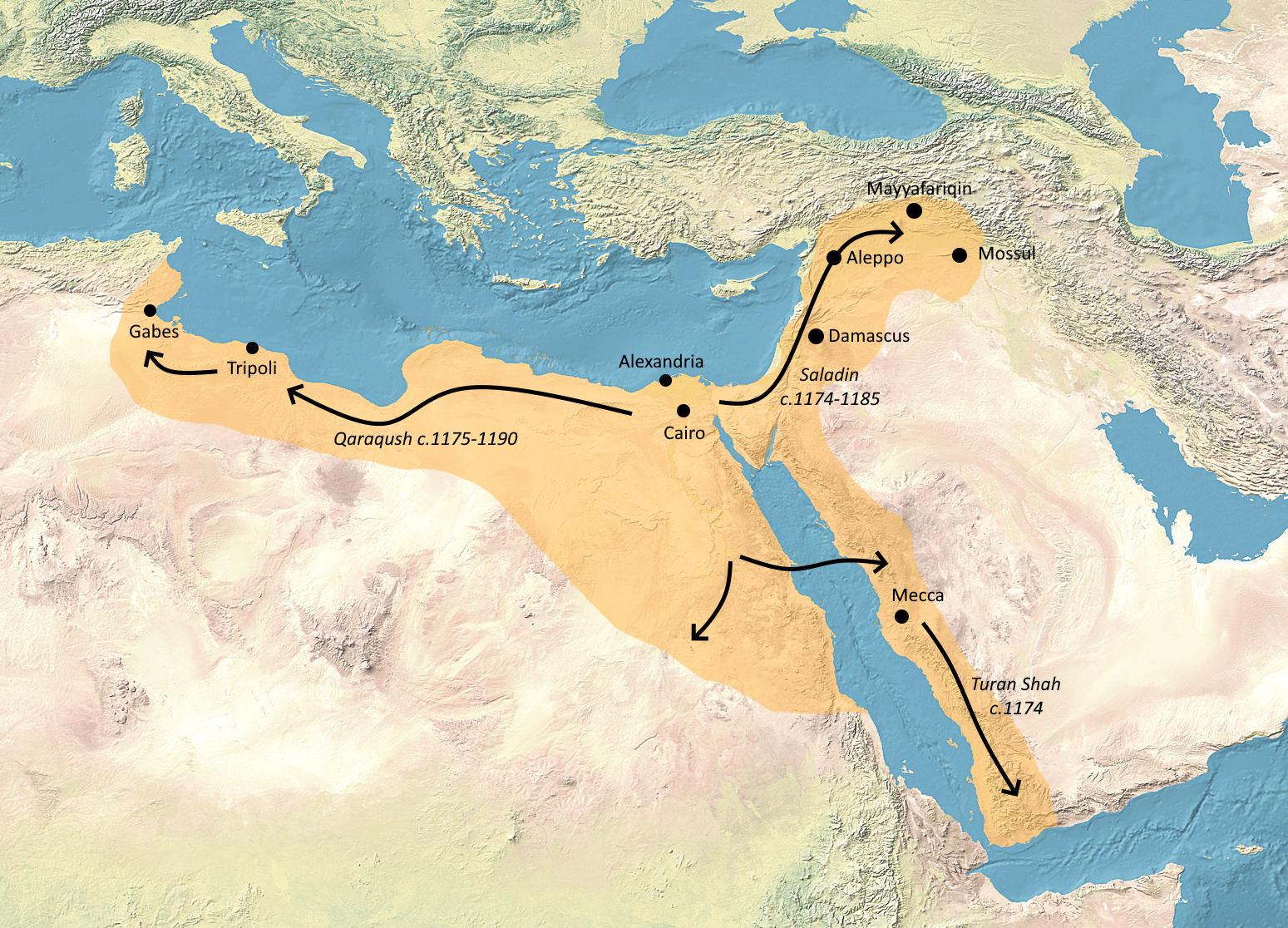
Ayyubid expansion 1174–1193.

Nur al-Din's original mission to Egypt was to restore restore Shawar as vizier to the teenage Fatimid caliph al-Adid. To accomplish this, he sent the Kurdish commander Shirkuh, who was accompanied by his nephew Saladin, then 27 years old. (Note: Saladin's father was Ayyub ibn Shādhi, a military commander in the Zengid dynasty. He was later governor of Damascus from 1154;) Shawar was restored to his post, but internal Egyptian politics led to Shirkuh replacing him as vizier. When Shirkuh died in 1169, Saladin was appointed vizier to al-Adid. Upon the death of al-Adid in 1171, Saladin proclaimed himself Sultan of Egypt, abolishing the Fatimid caliphate at Nur al-Din's insistence. In 1174, Nur al-Din died and Saladin moved to take much of Syria, including Damascus and Aleppo, and was proclaimed the Sultan of Egypt and Syria by the Abbasid caliph. The Ayyubid dynasty was born, and Saladin filled most of the important positions with family. The Kingdom of Jerusalem would soon face a unified Islamic force driven by jihad against the Latin West.

The Fatimids of Egypt were still a threat to the Franks, but the caliphate had been unstable since the 1121 assassination of the vizier al-Afdal Shahanshah and several of his successors. Al-Hafiz was the last Fatimid to rule as adult. After his death in 1149, his three successors were children, with the last being al-Adid who was succeeded by Saladin.

The Abbasid Caliphate was based in Baghdad and was the spiritual source of Sunni Islam. In 1160, caliph al-Mustanjid extricated himself from the Seljuks and his successor al-Mustadi aligned with Nur al-Din and, later, Saladin. When al-Nasir assumed the caliphate in 1180, his embrace of Saladin helped him complete his conquests.

=== Rulers of Jerusalem ===
The Kingdom of Jerusalem was less than a half-century old when the fall of Edessa led the Second Crusade and the Islamic resurgence that followed. While Jerusalem enjoyed primus inter pares with the Crusader states of Outremer, these states often acted independently. In addition, the rulers of the kingdom were often underaged, sickly or lacking in military experience, contributing to the catastrophe of 1187.

Political map of the Crusader states.

King since 1118, Baldwin II of Jerusalem, had no male heirs and designated his daughter Melisende to succeed him. He wished to safeguard the kingdom by marrying her to a powerful lord. Beginning in June 1129, Fulk V, Count of Anjou and Melisende became joint rulers of Jerusalem in 1131 with Baldwin II's death. Fulk assumed sole control of the government, excluding his wife. In 1143, while the king and queen were on holiday, Fulk was mortally wounded in a hunting accident. Their 13-year-old son Baldwin III of Jerusalem then ascended the throne with his mother as co-ruler. In 1152, Baldwin III took complete hold of the government.

Dying in 1163 without heirs, the heir-apparent was the king's brother, Amalric I of Jerusalem, but the Haute Cour refused to endorse Amalric's coronation unless his marriage to Agnes of Courtenay was annulled. Amalric agreed and ascended the throne without a wife. Almaric and Agnes had two children, Sibylla of Jerusalem and Baldwin IV of Jerusalem. Almaric married Maria Komnene in 1167, a union which produced a daughter Isabella, later queen. He died in 1174 and was succeeded by his son Baldwin IV.

In 1179, Baldwin IV began planning a marriage of Sibylla. After some intrigue, he hastily arranged her marriage to Guy of Lusignan. By 1182, Baldwin IV, increasingly incapacitated by his leprosy, came to an agreement with the Haute Cour to make the 5-year-old Baldwin V of Jerusalem his heir. Sibylla's son by her first marriage to William Longsword, Baldwin V was placed before Sibylla and Guy. The child was crowned co-king in 1183. Baldwin IV died in spring 1185, elevating Baldwin V to be the sole king. He, in turn, died shortly thereafter during the summer of 1186.

After the funeral of Baldwin V, Sibylla was named the successor to the throne, as Queen of Jerusalem, contingent of her agreement to divorce Guy. Once crowned, she immediately remarried Guy who was then crowned as king. Sibylla would die in 1190, leaving Guy to rule through the beginning of the Third Crusade. He became lord of Cyprus in 1192 and was succeeded by Almaric's daughter Isabella I of Jerusalem and her husband Conrad of Montferrat.

== Zengi's legacy ==
Zengi was a powerful Muslim ruler in the 12th century who played a major role in the struggles between Islam and the Franks in the Levant. (Note: Zengi's father was Aq Sunqur al-Hajib, the governor of Aleppo under the Seljuk ruler Malik-Shah I.) Born around 1085, he became the governor of Mosul in 1127 and within a year, Aleppo, establishing himself in both military and political matters. Zengi united Muslim territories at a time when the Crusader states had taken control of important lands following the First Crusade. His leadership marked the beginning of a more organized Muslim resistance against the Crusaders. (Note: Zengi married Zumurrud Khatun in 1138. She was the widow of Taj al-Muluk Buri.)

Zengi's greatest achievement came in 1144, when he captured the city of Edessa. The fall of Edessa shocked the Christian West because it was the first major Crusader city to be lost after decades of Christian control. This event resulted in the Second Crusade, as European leaders sought to regain their lost territory. Zengi's victory demonstrated that the Crusader states were vulnerable and that Muslim forces could reclaim lands through unity and military strength. His reputation grew throughout the Islamic world, where he was praised as a defender of Islam.

A skilled commander, Zengi was also known for being harsh and sometimes ruthless in his rule. He maintained strict control over his territories and dealt severely with rivals and rebellions. On 14 September 1146, he was assassinated by one of his servants while besieging a fortress in northern Syria. Despite his death, his legacy endured through his son, Nur al-Din, and later through Saladin, both of whom advanced the effort to unite Muslim lands against the Franks.

== Advent of Nur al-Din ==
Nur al-Din was the second son of Zengi and became governor of Aleppo upon his father's death. He was to continue his father's work to unity the Islamic world to fight jihad against the Franks.

=== Edessa revisited ===
Battle of Edessa in 1146, illustrated by Jeanne Montbaston (1337), Bibliothèque Nationale de France

After the death of Zengi, an Armenian contingent in Edessa began plotting with Joscelyn II of Edessa on how to retake the city. Together with Baldwin of Marash, Joscelyn assembled a force and retook control of the city on 27 October 1146. The defending Turkish garrison retreated to the citadel which Joscelyn was unable to subdue. Nur al-Din marched from Aleppo with a force of 10,000, arriving at Edessa on 2 November, beginning the second Siege of Edessa. Trapped between the besieging troops and those in the citadel, the Christians soon fell and were massacred or enslaved. Nur al-Din had most of the churches destroyed and the fortifications dismantled.

=== Unur and Damascus ===
In 1130, Zengi had allied with the emir of Damascus, Taj al-Mulk Buri, to fight the Latins, but this was a temporary alliance. (Note: Buri was the son of Toghtekin and founder of the Burid dynasty.) By 1135, Zengi began an unsuccessful siege of the city, the first of numerous attempts to add Damascus to his domain. The city's defense was led by the Mamluk commander Mu'in ad-Din Unur. By 1140, Unur had become the de facto ruler of Damascus as vizier to the young emir Mujir ad-Din Abaq, part of the Burid Dynasty. That same year, Unur joined with Fulk of Jerusalem in a siege of the city of Banias, an arrangement which led to an alliance with Jerusalem ostensibly to protect against aggression from Zengi. Banias has been under Zengid control since 1137, and after the successful siege, Abaq ceded the city to Fulk.

Under Unur, Damascus had shifting allegiance and in 1147 turned to the Zengids during the Second Crusade. The rapprochement between Unur and Nur al-Din also included the marriage of the former's daughter Ismat ad-Din Khatun to Nur al-Din. (Note: After the death of Nur al-Din, Ismat ad-Din Khatun would marry Saladin in order to legitimize his claim over Damascus.) Having established peace with Aleppo, Unur set out to besiege Salkhad and Bosra after their governor Altuntash allied with Jerusalem against him. This broke Jerusalem's treaty with Damascus, forcing Unur to turn to Nur al-Din for assistance. Nur al-Din arrived with an army of Aleppo, initiating the Battle of Bosra after which both cities surrendered to Damascus. Altuntash later came to Damascus seeking a pardon but was blinded and imprisoned.

The direction of the Second Crusade changed after the Council of Acre met on 24 June 1148 and decided to reroute the forces in-theater to attack Damascus. Unur, wary of the growing power of the Zengids, nevertheless turned to Nur al-Din and his brother Sayf al-Din for help. In July, the Crusader armies assembled at Tiberias and marched to Damascus. The Siege of Damascus took place on 24–28 July 1148 and was a disaster for the Crusaders, forcing them to retreat to Jerusalem, ending the Second Crusade.

In 1149, Unur led raids against Latin territory in response to the continued Latin raids against the territory of Damascus. He agreed to a two-year truce with Baldwin III, and then joined Nur al-Din against the Principality of Antioch. Unur's forces patrolled the Hauran while Nur al-Din defeated Antioch at Inab that year. After Unur's death in 1149, the emir Abaq continued his conciliatory policies towards the West. In 1150 and 1151, Nur al-Din besieged the city, but retreated each time with no success aside from empty recognition of his suzerainty. When Ascalon was captured by the Franks in 1153, Abaq forbade Nur al-Din from traversing his territory. The growing weakness of Damascus under the emir allowed Nur al-Din to overthrow him in 1154 with help from the population of the city. Damascus was annexed to Zengid territory, and all of Syria was unified under the authority of Nur al-Din, from Edessa in the north to the Hauran in the south.

=== Muslim victory at Inab ===
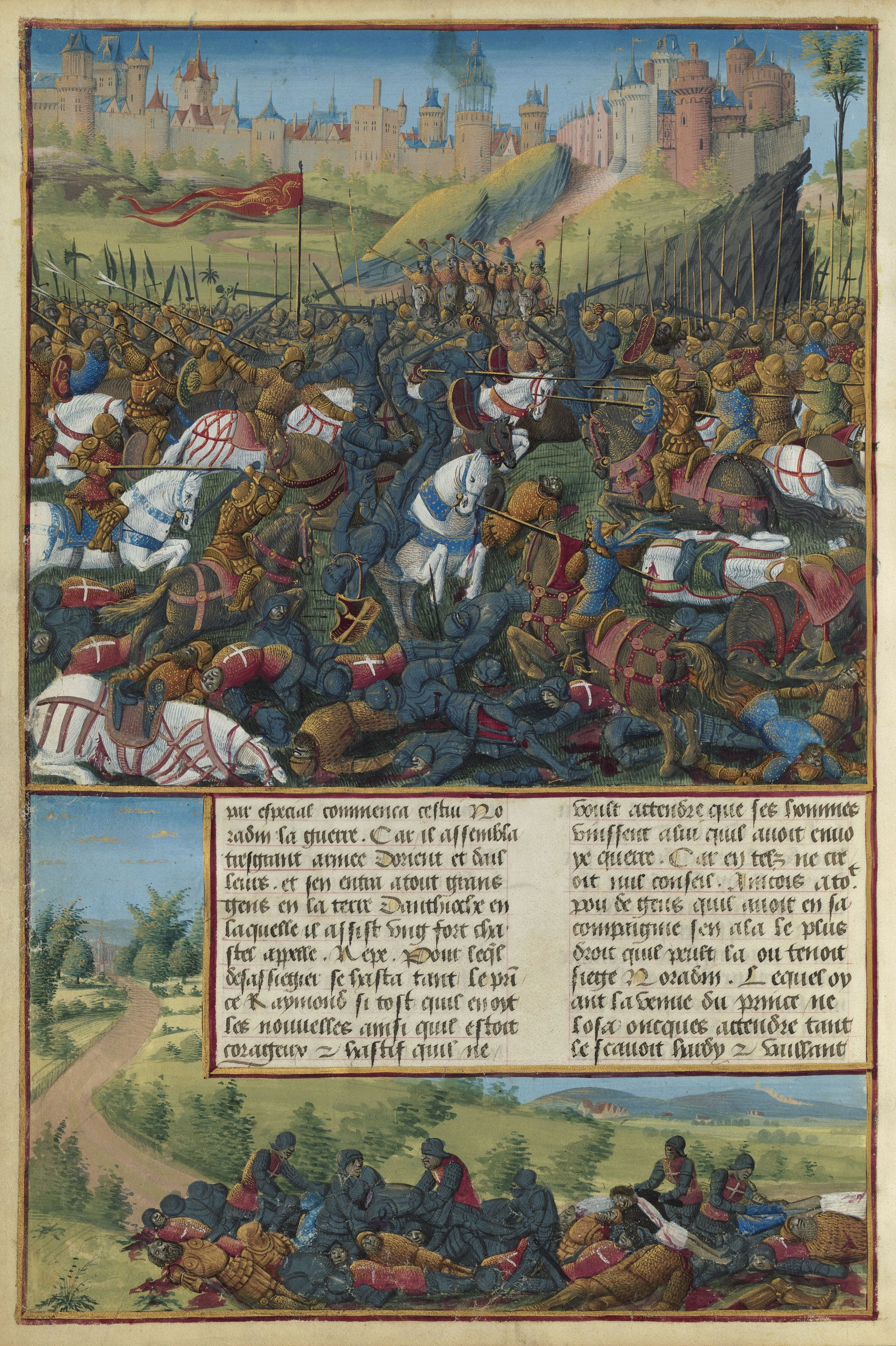
Nūr al-Din's victory at the Battle of Inab, 1149. Illustration from the Passages d'outremer, c. 1490.

Following the Crusader defeat at Damascus, Nur al-Din sought to consolidate his power in Syria. Having established his bona fides in Aleppo and at the 1146 capture of the city of Edessa, he first invaded the Principality of Antioch in late 1148 and laid siege to Afamiya. This invasion was easily repelled by Raymond of Antioch. In June 1149, Nur al-Din again invaded Antioch and besieged the fortress of Inab in northern Syria.

For the invasion, Nur al-Din allied himself with Unur, as supported by Turcomans, with a large force, predominately cavalry. Defending Inab were Raymond and his Antiochene forces as supported by the Assassins, sworn enemies of Nur al-Din, led by one Ali ibn-Wafa. Raymond received no help from the neighboring Crusader states. Joscelin II of Edessa had been Raymond's enemy since he had refused to send an army to relieved the besieged Edessa in 1146, making as alliance with Nur al-Din against Antioch. Baldwin III and Melissande refused to aid Raymond as did Raymond II of Tripoli. Having defeated Nur al-Din before, Raymond was confident that his small army was more than sufficient.

The forces of Raymond and ibn-Wafa approached Inab and encamped nearby in open county. Nur al-Din's scouts discovered the enemy forces and, surrounded the camp during the night. On 29 June 1149, the Battle of Inab began when Nur al-Din attacked and destroyed the army of Antioch. Even with an avenue of escape available, Raymond did not abandon his soldiers and was killed along with ibn-Wafa and Reynald of Marash. Most of Antioch was now open to Nur al-Din, including a route to the Mediterranean. Nur al-Din's overwhelming victory at Inab cemented his position as the predominant Islamic commander in the Levant.

Nur al-Din went on to capture the fortresses of Artah and Harim, which defended the approach to the city of Antioch itself. He then sent his army to again besiege Afamiya, this time successfully. After plundering the region, he laid siege to Antioch itself, defenseless because of the loss of its army. Raymond's widow Constance of Antioch and patriarch Aimery of Limoges negotiated a settlement, and Nur al-Din was bought off with treasure coming from the patriarch's own possessions. Upon receiving news that Baldwin III was marching north to relieve the siege, Nur al-Din opened negotiations. The border between Antioch and Aleppo was redrawn to Nur al-Din's advantage and the armies returned home.

=== Final destruction of the County of Edessa ===
Following the fall of Edessa in 1144, Joscelin II of Edessa fled to Turbessel, where the remnants of the western part of the county remained. Most of the Crusader fortresses in the county then fell into disrepair and subsequently abandoned. The exception was at Azaz, just 20 miles from Aleppo, where Humphrey II of Toron sent sixty knights to reinforce the garrison in 1146.

The expansion of the county of Edessa prior to 1131.

The loss at Inab in the summer of 1149 left Joscelin surrounded by Islamic forces. Shortly thereafter, Mesud I, the Seljuk sultan of Rum, invaded the Principality of Antioch and proceeded to besiege Joscelin at Turbessel. Baldwin III come north with noblemen Raymond II of Tripoli and Humphrey II of Toron. They led a contingent of knights both to help Joscelin and to defend Azaz, which remained a key asset in the region. This show of force convinced Mesud to abandon his siege. At the same time, the Artuqid emir Kara Arslan turned on Joscelin and invaded Edessa, seizing Gargar and the surrounding area. A subsequent joint Frankish-Armenian attempt to turn him back failed.

In the spring of 1150, Joscelin was en route to Antioch when he was taken prisoner by Nur al-Din's men. When his identity became known, he was taken to the emir who had him blinded and imprisoned. The county of Edessa was then invaded on all sides and absorbed by Mesud, Timurtash, and Nur al-Din. Joscelin spent the remaining nine years of his life in captivity.

Upon the capture of Joscelin, Nur al-Din attacked Turbessel but a strong defense was offered by the countess Beatrice of Saone, and he withdrew. But it was clear that the city could not be held. She was prepared to abandon the city when an offer to buy Turbessel and the remainder of the county came from emperor Manuel I Komnenos. The sale include the fortresses of Turbessel, Ravendel, Samosata, Aintab, Dülük and Birejik, but the countess retained possession of Rum Kalaat, which she gave to the Armenian Apostolic Church.

In August 1150, Nur al-Din once again went on the offensive, confronting Baldwin III and his withdrawing force at the Battle of Aintab. The Islamic forces fell upon Baldwin's column between Dülük and Aintab, and was able to get his non-combatants safely into the town of Aintab. The next day, the column was formed to protect the refugees and the baggage train. Baldwin led the advance guard with his knights protecting the right and left flanks. Raymond II and Humphrey II formed the rear guard. Nur al-Din attacked the Franks throughout the day, but he withdrew at sunset, lacking both success and supplies. The Franks' soldiers and non-combatants made it safely to Antiochene territories without further incident.

An alliance was formed when Nur al-Din married Mesud's daughter shortly after Joscelin's capture. In the spring of 1151, these allies attacked the Byzantine garrisons at Turbessel, with the spoils shared amongst Mesud, Timurtash and Nur al-Din. The resistance was initially strong but eventually was starved out and the Fall of Turbessel happened on 12 July 1151. All of the County of Edessa had been taken by the Muslims.

Raymond II would soon see the County of Tripoli under attack by these same forces. Nur al-Din attacked the county in spring 1152 and capturing Tortosa and leaving a garrison there. Soon after, Baldwin III came to Tripoli to coordinate a response with the leading barons of Jerusalem and Tripoli. After the king's arrival, Nur al-Din's troops left Tortosa after destroying the fortress. (Note: Raymond II of Tripoli would succumb to an Assassin's blade as discussed in Section 3.4.)

=== Assassins in Syria ===
The Assassins were founded by the Arab religious scholar Hassan-i Sabbah in 1090 after the capture of Alamut Castle in the Alborz mountain range of Persia. They practiced a radical form of Islam which called for the killing of their perceived enemies–Muslim or Christian–and when convenient, forming alliances with them. (Note: A list of prominent figures that fell victim to the Assassins can be found at Assassin victims.) Beginning in the early 12th century, the Assassins moved into Syria, wreaking havoc on the Syrian rulers, with their first major target being Mawdud, atabeg of Mosul, in 1113. Mawdud was felled by Assassins in Damascus while a guest of Toghtekin, atabeg of Damascus. He was replaced at Mosul by al-Bursuqi, who himself fell victim in 1126. A Persian Assassin named Bahram al-Da'i appeared in Damascus reflecting cooperation between the Assassins and Toghtekin, including a joint operation against the Crusaders at the Battle of Marj al-Saffar.

After the death of Toghtekin in 1128, his son Taj al-Muluk Buri began working to free Damascus of the Assassins. At least 6000 Assassins were killed, with the rest fleeing to Frankish territory. Alamut organized a counterstrike, with two Persian Assassins disguised as Turkish soldiers striking down Buri in 1131, dying of his wounds the next year. Abbasid caliph ar-Rashid was murdered by Assassins in 1136, resulting in a week of celebration at Alamut. Another significant success was the assassination of Da'ud, the son of Mahmud II, the Seljuk sultan of Iraq, who ruled in Azerbaijan and Jibal. Da'ud was felled by four Assassins in Tabriz in 1143, rumored to have been dispatched by Zengi.

In 1149, an Assassin named Ali ibn-Wafa allied with Raymond of Antioch to defend the borders of the principality against Zengid expansion. The forces met at the Battle of Inab, with Nur al-Din defeating the Franks, killing both Raymond and ibn-Wafa. Nur al-Din would again foil the Assassins in 1158, incorporating a castle at Shaizar that they had occupied after the 1157 earthquake into his territory. A few years later in 1152, possibly in retaliation to the establishment of the Knights Templar at Tartus, Raymond II of Tripoli was attacked and killed by two members of the Assassins. As the Assassins had not previously attacked Frankish rulers, this marked the first known Christian victim.

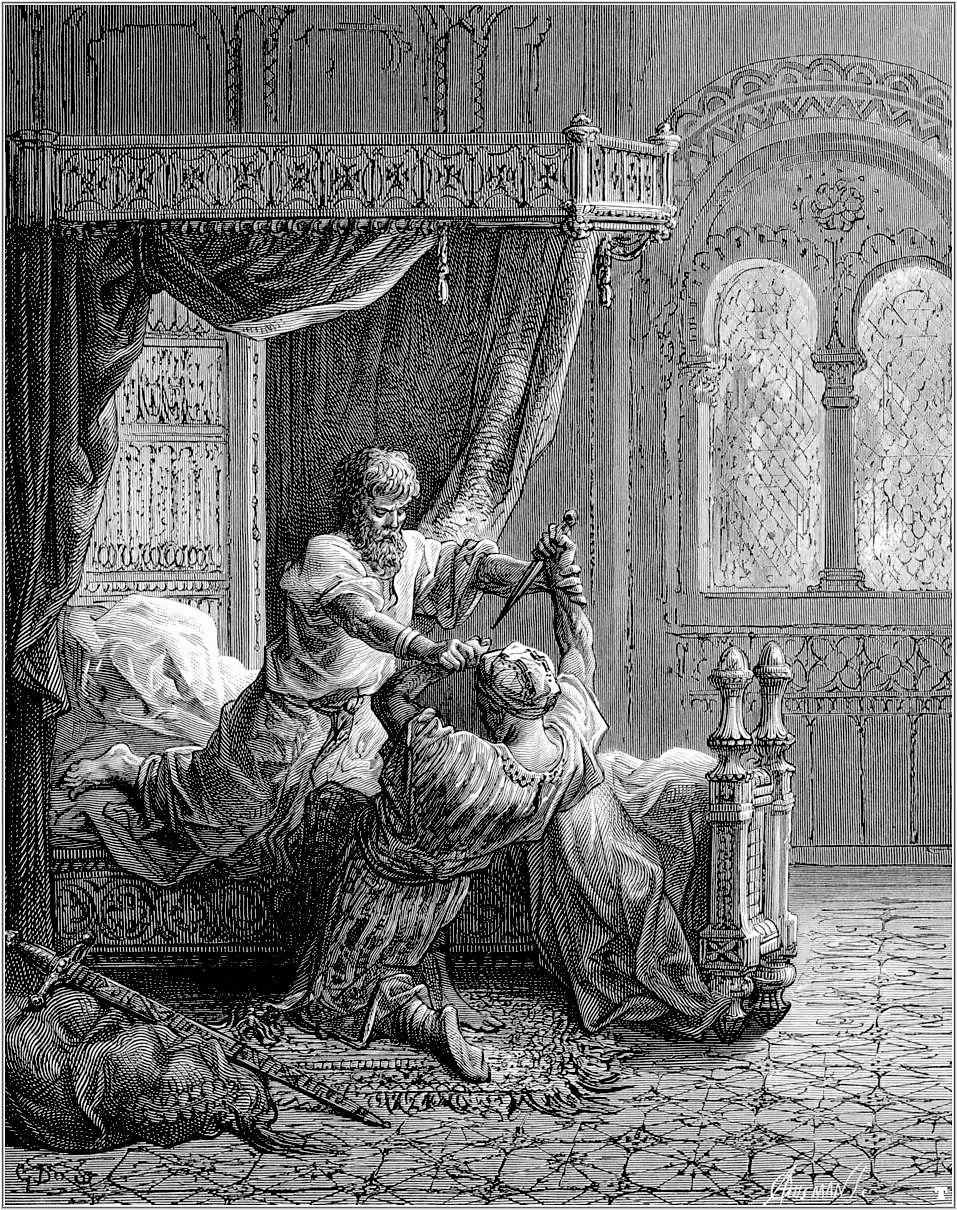
Edward I of England thwarts an attempt on his life by an Assassin and kills the attacker. 19th-century depiction by Gustave Doré

In 1162, Rashid ad-Din Sinan, an alchemist and schoolmaster, was dispatched to Syria as a messenger of his Islamic views and to continue the Assassins' mission. Known as the Old Man in the Mountain, he was among the greatest of the Assassin chiefs, first making headquarters at al-Kahf Castle and then the fortress of Masyaf. Sinan's chief enemy was Saladin who, in his campaign to conquer Syria, was intruding on the Assassins' domain. In early 1175, a group of thirteen knife-wielding Assassins managed to penetrate Saladin's camp, nearly reaching the sultan. Again in May 1176, Assassins breached Saladin's tent and wounded him. That August, Saladin decided to eliminate the threat at attack the headquarters at Masyaf Castle. The assault was broken off in less than a week for reasons unknown. Realizing he was unable to subdue the Assassins, he sought to align himself with them, consequently depriving the Franks of aligning themselves against him.

In 1191, Sinan ordered the successful assassination of Conrad of Montferrat, the newly elected king of Jerusalem. Whether this happened in coordination with Richard the Lionheart, with Saladin, or with neither, remains unknown. The Assassins were active throughout the last Crusades. In the late 13th century, they were allied with the Egyptian sultan Baibars and unsuccessfully attempted to kill the leader of Lord Edward's Crusade, the future king of England Edward I. The Assassins were effectivley destroyed by the Mongols in 1256.

=== Ascalon falls to the Franks ===
After years of setbacks at the hands of the Muslims, the Franks of Jerusalem went on the offensive at Ascalon, on the Mediterranean just north of Gaza. In the early years of the kingdom, the 1099 Battle of Ascalon was a defeat for the Fatimid forces, but the fort was not occupied by the Crusaders. The Egyptians maintained possession and refortified the site. The Fatimids considered the fortress to be a bulwark to prevent a Frankish invasion of Egypt.

In the 1130s and 1140s, the Franks built a series of forts to contain Ascalon and protect the kingdom's southern border. These were Ibelin, Blanchegarde, Beth Gibelin and Montgisard. In 1150, the fortifications of Gaza City were rebuilt. This ring of forts cut off Ascalon from overland supply routes, forcing the Egyptians to keep the city supplied by sea. The military orders also became prominent in the defense of Jerusalem: Gaza was given to the Knights Templar and Beth Gibelin had already been entrusted to the Knights Hospitaller in 1136.

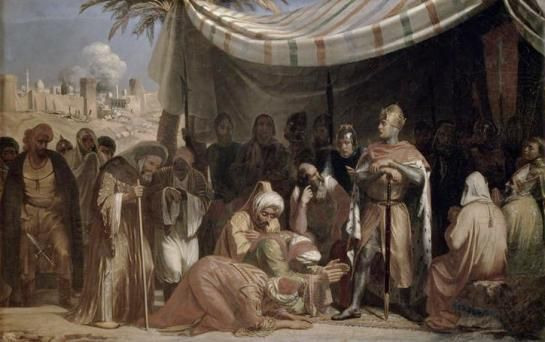
Baldwin III of Jerusalem receiving capitulation of Ascalon, by Sébastien-Melchior Cornu

In 1150, the Fatimids saw the threat posed by Jerusalem to Ascalon and asked Nur al-Din to participate in a joint defensive action. He refused, concentrating instead on Damascus. By 1152, quarrels between Baldwin III and his mother Melisende had consumed the kingdom, and the Artuqid emir Timurtash of Mardin decided to take advantage of the resulting chaos by attacking Jerusalem.

Timurtash's offensive was easily repelled, and Baldwin decided to take the initiative and attack Ascalon. His army arrived at the city on 25 January 1153, beginning the Siege of Ascalon. The attacking force included the patriarch Fulcher of Angoulême, carrying the relic of the True Cross, and grand masters Raymond du Puy and Bernard de Tremelay. Key leaders of contingents included Hugh of Ibelin, Philip of Milly, Humphrey II of Toron, Maurice of Montreal, Walter of Saint-Omer, and Raynald of Châtillon.

The siege lasted five months with little progress. Then, on 15–16 August, the defenders attempted to set fire to one of the Franks' siege engines and the fire pushed back, causing the nearby wall to collapse. Still it took three days for the city to be taken and a formal surrender happening on 22 August 1153. This became the first major expansion of the Kingdom of Jerusalem since the acquisition of Banias in 1140. The victory also increased the prestige of Baldwin III.

== Consolidation in Syria ==
Over the decade following his defeat at Ascalon, Nur al-Din would go on to consolidate his power in Syria, winning significant victories at Damascus, Shaizar and Harim. Frankish victories under Baldwin III were few but significant, including Butahai and al-Buqaia.

=== Nur al-Din takes Damascus ===
After four unsuccessful sieges, Damascus would soon fall to Nur al-Din without a fight. As a result of the victory at Ascalon in 1153, the Burid emir Mujir ad-Din Abaq began paying an annual tribute to Jerusalem which was unpopular with the Damascene population. The citizens overthrew Abaq in favor of Nur al-Din, and the transfer of power was negotiated by Saladin's father Ayyub ibn Shādhi and uncle Shirkuh. On 25 April 1154, Nur al-Din took Damascus, cementing his rule in Syria. Abaq retired to Homs and Ayyub would serve as governor of Damascus under his son.

=== Frankish defeat at 'Ain al-Mallaha ===
Facing a unified Muslim enemy, the Franks of Jerusalem sought a truce with Nur al-Din, declared between the two in February 1157. Three months later, Baldwin III broke the truce by raiding Turkoman flocks in the area of the fortified town Banias, a stronghold that had been given to the Hospitallers by the Damascus emir in 1140. In response, on 18 May, the Damascenes laid siege to Banias. Baldwin III assembled an army and rushed to the defense of the town. En route, they were ambushed by Nur al-Din's forces near Jacob's Ford at the Battle of 'Ain al-Mallaha (Lake Huleh) on 19 June 1157. The Franks were badly defeated and many taken captive, including Hugh of Ibelin, and Templars Bertrand de Blanchefort and Odo of St. Amand. Nur al-Din paraded his captives in chains, along with the severed heads of the slain enemies, through the streets of Damascus. Nevertheless, Banias remained in Latin hands for now, not succumbing to Nur al-Din until 1174.

=== Franks' unsuccessful Siege of Shaizar ===
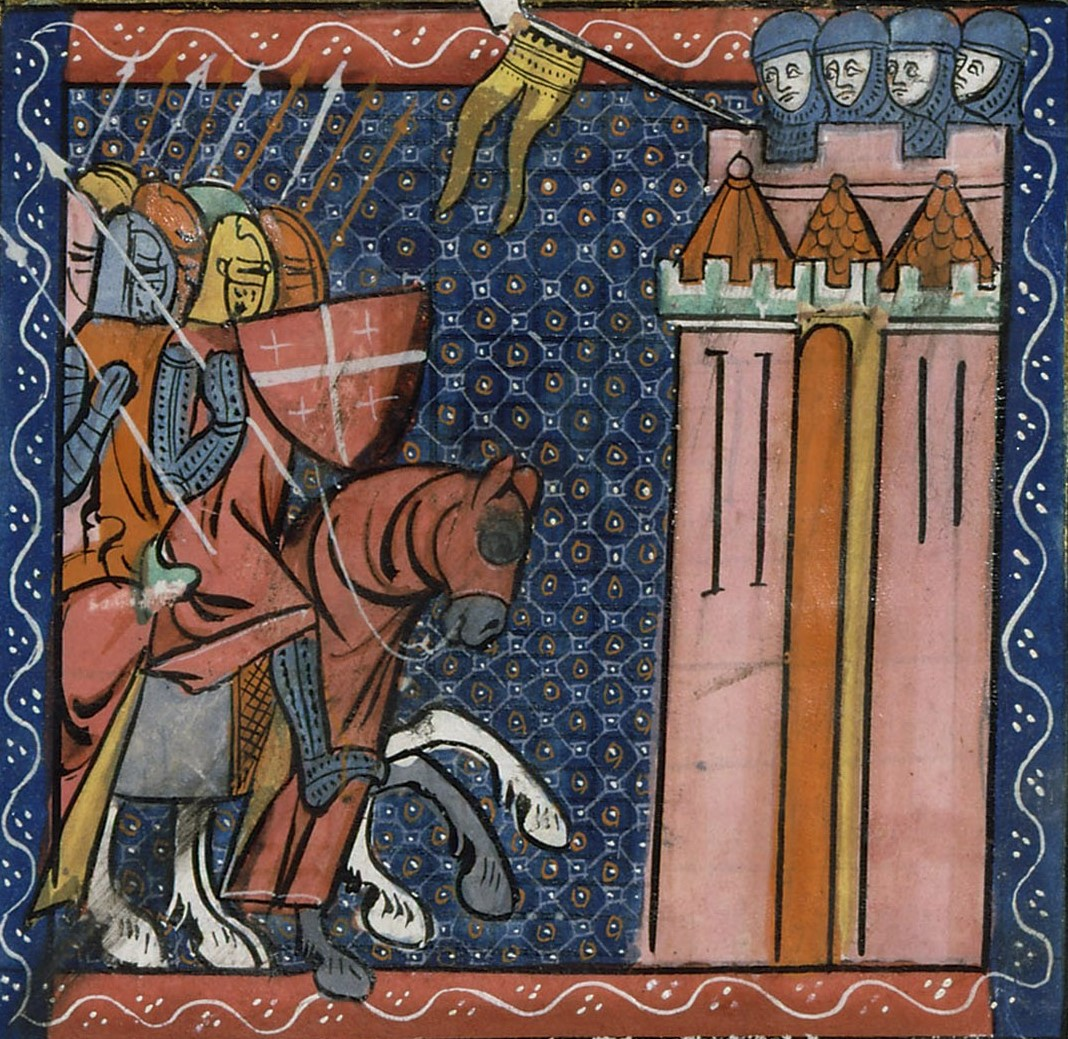
Siege of Shaizar

Soon after, Baldwin III mounted a campaign in northern Syria against the town of Shaizar. The ruler of Shaizar had been friendly with the Christians, but, damaged by the 1157 Hama earthquake on 12 August, the town was in chaos and Nur al-Din occupied it. Seeking to keep the town in friendly hands, Baldwin assembled an impressive force in November 1157 that included Raynald of Châtillon, Thierry of Flanders, Reginald of Sidon and Raymond III of Tripoli. Nur al-Din had fallen ill that October, retiring to Aleppo, and his defending forces were disorganized. Baldwin called on the Armenian Thoros II for reinforcements and then marched on the town. In the meantime, the town's citadel had been occupied by a band of Assassin adventurers.

The Siege of Shaizar began with relative ease, and the Franks and Armenians took the lower town with little resistance. However, the city walls and citadel were fiercely defended. Disagreement about the disposition of the town among the attackers caused serious friction and the siege was abandoned. Nur al-Din promptly appointed an emir to oversee the reconstruction of the town and integrated it into his domain. The Frankish adventure was not totally in vain, as they went on to recover the castle at Harim, taken by Nur al-Din in 1149 in the aftermath of Inab.

=== Frankish victory at Butaiha ===
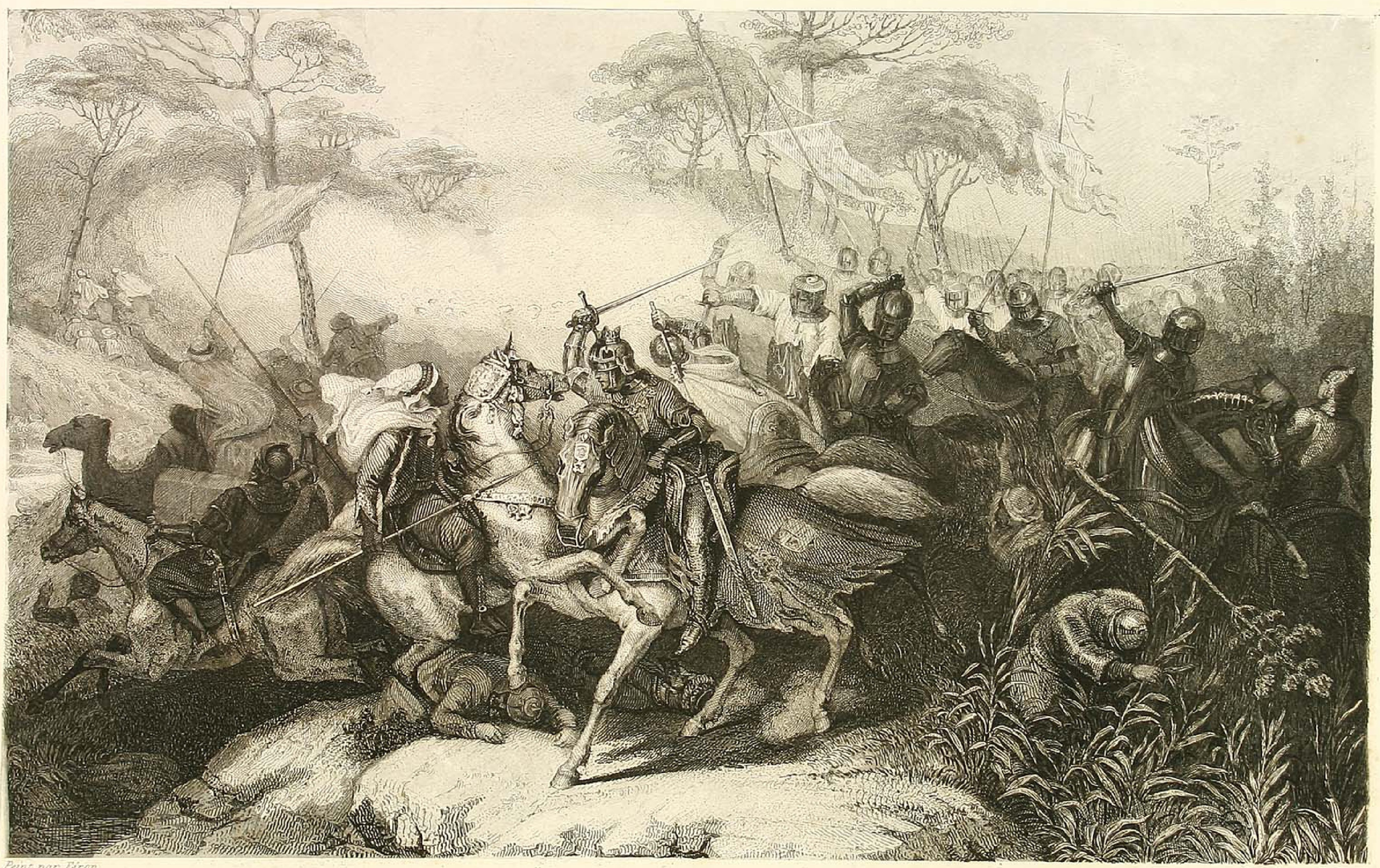
Battle of Putaha (engraving by E. Lechard, c. 1838, original painting by Éloi Firmin Féron)

The Franks and Muslims would soon meet again on the plains near the village of Butaiha (Putaha), northeast of Lake Tiberias. In March 1158, Baldwin III led an army that included Thiery of Flanders and a contingent of Hospitallers. defending the Lordship of Transjordain. They arrived at the gates of Damascus on 7 April. Nur al-Din mounted a counter-offensive, attacking both Sidon and Cave de Sueth (Ayn al-Habis). Baldwin sought to take the initiative, and met Nur al-Din at the Battle of Butaiha on 15 July 1158. The Franks successfully repelled the Muslim warriors, inflicting heavy casualties. The victory at Butaiha was regarded as one of the most significant military successes for the Franks, bolstering the morale of the Christian states in the region and demonstrating their military capabilities against a unified Muslim threat. So significant was the Frankish victory that Nur al-Din sought a truce, and the Syrian-Palestinian frontier was peaceful for several years.

=== Capture of Raynald of Châtillon at Marash ===
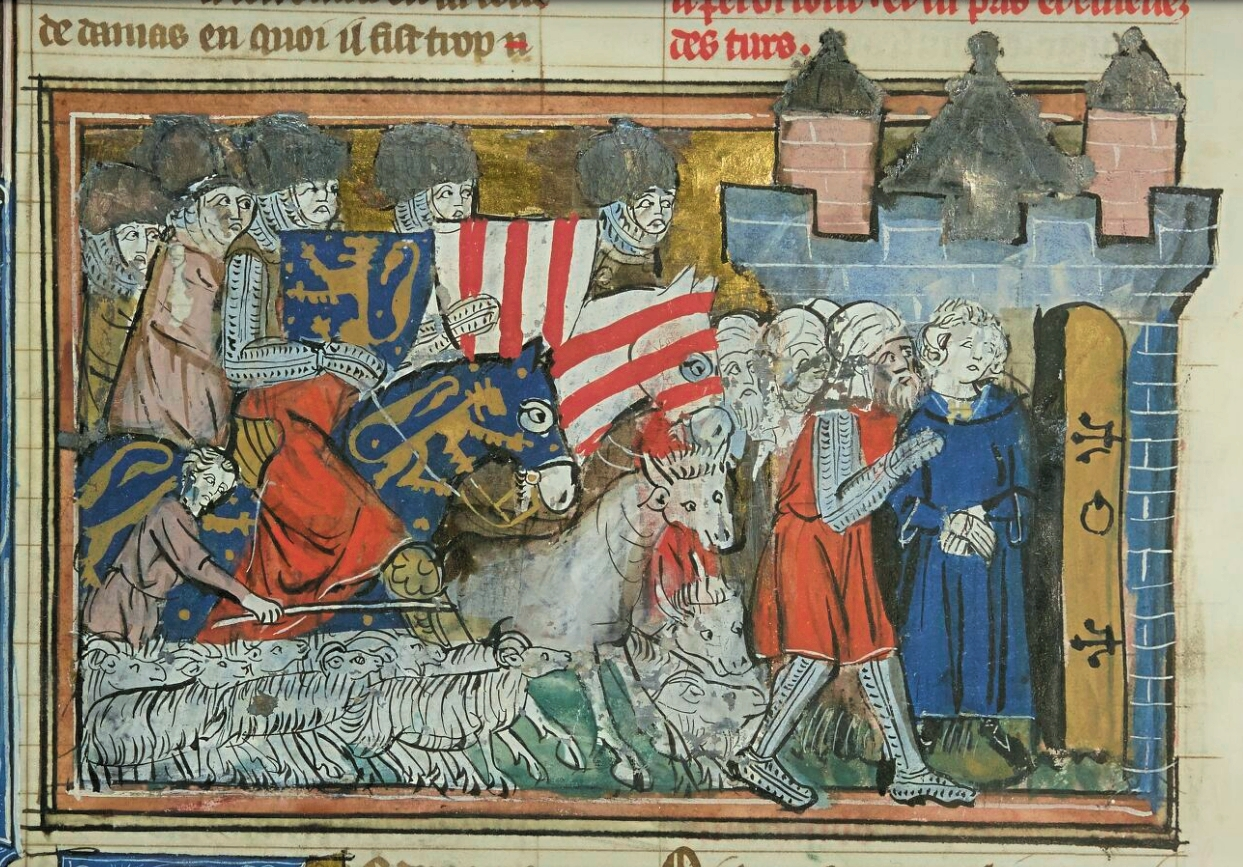
The capture of Raynald of Châtillon

In the fall of 1161, Raynald of Châtillon set out with a small contingent on a raiding party north of Aleppo, seeking to pilfer cattle from Muslim ranchers. The Aleppeans deployed a defending force, and, instead of retreating, Raynald decided to stay and fight. The resulting Battle of Marash on 23 November saw Raynald's force consistently repelling the Muslim attacks. Late in the day, the Franks lost their cohesion and retreated. Raynald tried to rally his troops but soon found himself surrounded and taken prisoner. His troops, numbering some 400 knights and infantry, were slaughtered, with only 30 taken prisoner.

Raynald would spend the next 15 years in captivity as neither the barons of Antioch nor the king of Jerusalem stepped up to pay his ransom. His wife Constance of Antioch ruled Antioch with her young son Bohemond III until her death in 1163. Bohemond eventually negotiated the release of his stepfather in 1176 as part of an alliance with the atabeg of Damascus to counter Saladin (as discussed in Section 6.4). Raynald would marry Stephanie of Milly and become lord of Transjordan, remaining active in the kingdom's affairs.

=== Muslim defeat at al-Buqaia ===
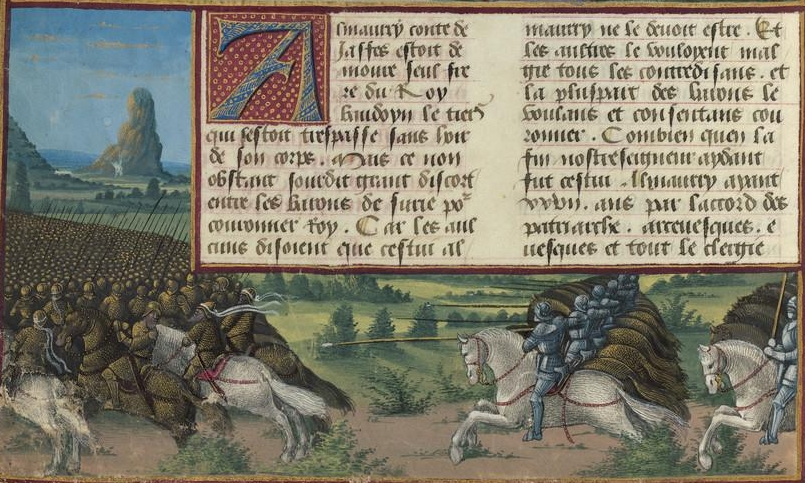
Battle of al-Buqaia, miniature by Jean Colombe from Sébastien Mamerot's book "Passages d'outremer" (1474)

On 10 February 1163, Baldwin III died and was succeeded by his brother Almaric, who in September of that year launched an attack on Egypt. Shortly thereafter, the absence of the king at Jerusalem compelled Nur al-Din to launch an offensive in Lebanon near the Beqaa Valley at a town named al-Buqaia. The ultimate objective of the Battle of al-Buqaia was to mount an attack on nearby Krak des Chevaliers. With the County of Tripoli being threatened, Raymond III of Tripoli mustered an army and called on Bohemund III of Antioch for help. He was supported by a group of recently arrived French pilgrims led by Hugh VIII of Lusignan as well as Konstantinos Kalamanos, the Byzantine governor of Cilicia. (Note: Emperor Manuel I Komnenos had marched on Cilicia in the winter of 1158, driving Thoros of Cilicia into hiding, making Armenian Cilicia a Byzantine province that became allied with Antioch.)

Templar Gilbert de Lacy was appointed commander of the force. The Discovering an advanced party, the Franks took off in pursuit and surprised the main camp of Nur al-Din. The Muslims were routed and retreated, with Nur al-Din barely escaping with his life. The emir was filled with rage at his loss and vowed revenge. Later that year, the Franks offered a truce which Nur al-Din refused.

=== Disasters at Harim and Banias ===
Stung by his defeat at al-Buqaia, Nur al-Din, his brother Qutb al-Din Mawdud and the Artuqids princes of Diyarbakır and Mardin assembled a force and set out to capture the Frankish stronghold at Harim. First captured by the Crusaders in 1097, it fell to Nur al-Din after the Battle of Inab, and was recaptured by the Franks in 1158.

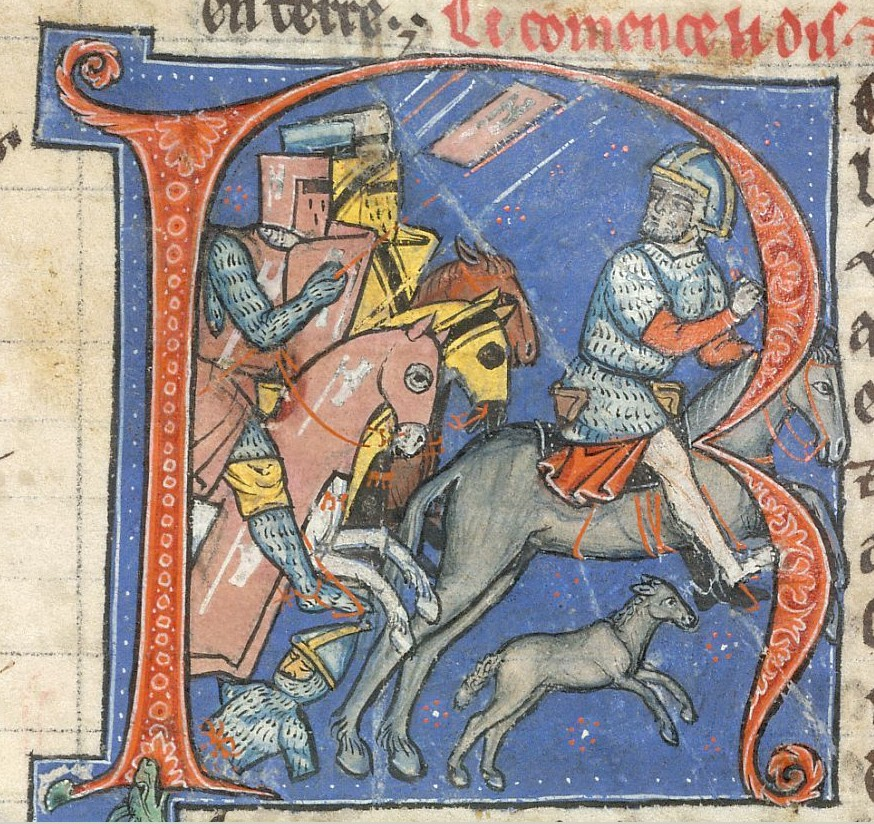
Battle of Harim, Histoire d'Outremer (1232–1261)

In early August 1164, the Muslim forces laid siege to the castle. The city's lord Raynald of Saint-Valery put up a valiant defense but could not last long without reinforcements. From Antioch, Bohemond III called on support from Tripoli and Byzantium, and Raymond III of Tripoli, Konstantinos Kalamanos and the Armenian Thoros II joined the relief force. At the news of the approaching Franks, Nur al-Din called off the siege and retreated.

Despite warnings from Raynald, Bohemond took the chase and caught the retreating Muslim force on 10 August near Artah, beginning the Battle of Harim. Bohemond charged the Muslims directly, who at first feigned retreat, but turned to the attack. The Frankish forces were decimated with many of the senior commanders taken prisoner. The captives included Bohemond, Raymond, Kalamanos, Hugh VIII of Lusignan and Joscelin III of Edessa. They were taken bound together in chains to Aleppo.

Nur al-Din was urged to take the fight to Antioch, but he refused. Not wishing to feel the wrath of emperor Manuel I Komnenos and risk Antioch becoming a Byzantine province, he preferred to have a weaken Crusader state. Before long, Nur al-Din released Bohemond for a ransom because he regarded them as vassals of the Byzantine emperor. In his work The Complete History, the contemporaneous Arab historian Ibn al-Athir wrote:

The Muslims advised [Nur al-Din] to proceed to Antioch and seize it because it was devoid of defenders and fighting men to hold it, but he did not do so. He said, "The city is an easy matter but the citadel is strong. Perhaps they will surrender it to the Byzantine emperor because its ruler is his nephew. To have Bohemond as a neighbor I find preferable to being a neighbour of the ruler of the Constantinople." He sent out squadrons in those areas and they plundered, seized and killed the inhabitants. Later he ransomed Prince Bohemond for a large sum of money and the release of many Muslim captives.

The disposition of the captives was uneven. Kalamanos was released after three years for a handsome ransom. Raymond III spent eight years in captivity. Hugh VIII died in captivity after many years. Joscelin III, after sharing a cell with Raynald of Châtillon, was released in 1176. Adding Banias to his list of conquered fortresses on 18 November 1164, Nur al-Din had achieved his revenge for his ignominous defeat at al-Buqaia.

== Saladin, Ayyubid sultan of Egypt ==
It was less than a year after Amalric became king that he undertook his first expedition to conquer Egypt. Ironically, the king's aggression would trigger a strong response from Nur al-Din, and Jerusalem and Cairo would become allies. The result would be the Franks fighting a two-theater war against the Muslims, and lead to the rise of Saladin.

=== Fatimids in 1163 ===
By the mid-12th century, the Fatimid caliphate was in disarray. Al-Adid li-Dīn Allāh had been Fatimid caliph since 1160, succeeding his uncle al-Fa'iz bi-Nasr Allah when he was just nine years. As such, al-Adid was controlled by powerful viziers, beginning with Tala'i ibn Ruzzik who had supported his father and was instrumental in elevating him to the throne. That year, Baldwin III threatened an invasion of Egypt, but halted his plans with the promise of the payment of a large annual tribute by Egypt. Tala'i was succeeded by his son Ruzzik ibn Tala'i in 1161 who the next year was murdered by the governor of Upper Egypt, Shawar. Shawar's vizierate lasted but nine months when he was overthrown on 31 August 1163 by one of his commanders, Dirgham. Shawar fled to Syria as Dirgham's purges decimated the senior ranks of the Egyptian army.

=== Franks and Syrians invade Egypt ===
In September 1163, Amalric, king since his brother's death in February, using the pretext that the yearly tribute had not been paid by Cairo, began an invasion of Egypt. For the first phase, his forces crossed the Isthmus of Suez to besiege the Egyptian city of Bilbeis. The Egyptians then opened up the Nile dams and let the river flood, forcing the Franks' withdrawal. Amalric returned home but kept his focus on North Africa.

Later that year, the deposed Egyptian vizier Shawar arrived in Damascus, hoping to bring Nur al-Din to his cause of reinstatement. At first reticent, he demured, not wanting the Franks to upset the balance of power by establishing a foothold in the Nile. In April 1164, he entrusted his longstanding Kurdish commander Shirkuh with the command of a force to invade Egypt and restore Shawar to his office. Shirkuh was accompanied by his nephew, Saladin, then just twenty-seven years old.

Entering Egypt, Shirkuh first took the town of Fustat, south of Cairo. By late May 1164, Dirgham was dead, struck by an arrow fired by one of his own men. The caliph then installed Shawar as vizier. Relations between Shawar and Shirkuh soon soured, with the Kurd refusing to leave Egypt even with a large incentive, moving his forces to Bilbeis.

Showing a flexibility in allegiances, Shawar turned to Amalric, offering the king financial incentives to come to his rescue. Amalric marched to Egypt and connected with Shawar in July 1164 where they laid siege to Shirkuh's forces, now ensconced at Bilbeis. A stalemate lasted three months when, in October, word reached Amalric about Nur al-Din's successes at Harim and Banias. Amalric quickly negotiated a settlement and both the Latins and Syrians departed Egypt, leaving Shawar in control.

In the years that followed, Shirkuh became increasingly independent of Nur al-Din and planned a further invasion of Egypt. He amassed a large army that included a number of Nur al-Din's warlords. In January 1167, his forces crossed the Sinai, leading Shawar to again turn to Jerusalem for help. In exchange for a large tribute, Amalric and his forces marched to Egypt in February.

=== Battles at al-Babein and Alexandria ===
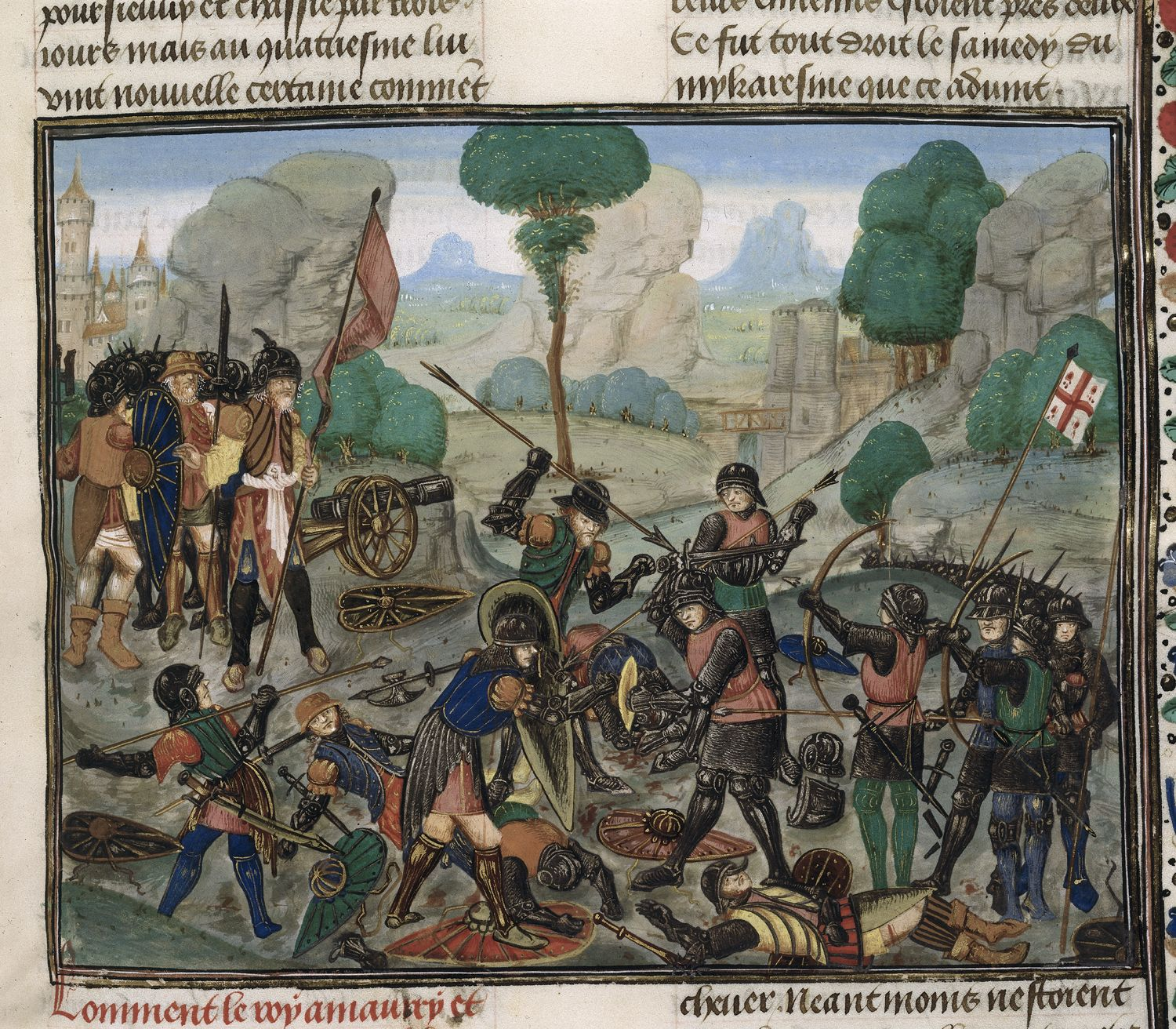
Amalric and Shirkuh at battle

On 28 March 1167, the Franks led by Amalric and the Syrians under Shirkuh met at the Battle of al-Babein, in the desert south of Cairo near Giza. The Christians were outnumbered, but still Shirkuh did not press his advantage. Finally, a number of his senior commanders including Saladin convinced him to do battle. Losing a large number of knights, Amalric retreated, the battle a stalemate.

From al-Babein, Shirkuh marched to Alexandria, arriving in the summer of 1167. Amalric followed the Syrians and began the Siege of Alexandria. Surrounded by land and sea, the defenders were in desperate straits after only a month. Shirkuh then led a small force out of the city and past the king's men, leaving Saladin in command. Almaric began to pursue his nemesis, but the Egyptians supporting convinced him to stay and press the siege, that the city's defenses were close to collapse. Shirkuh was conducting raids in Upper Egypt and, seeing the deteriorating conditions in Alexandria, decided to sue for peace. It was agreed that both armies would leave Egypt and Shawar would remain in power. Shirkuh returned to Damascus in September and Amalric to Ascalon in August.

=== Campaign of 1168 ===
Egypt was now, in essence, a client-state of Jerusalem and Almaric once again had ambitions to conquer the Fatimids. Having married the grandniece of emperor Manuel in 1167, he had closer ties with Byzantium and proposed a joint operation against Egypt. Impatient and prodded by Hospitaller Grand Master Gilbert of Assailly, he launched an invasion in late October 1168, besieging Bilbeis. The city fell on 4 November, with the Franks sparing few of the inhabitants.

A siege of Cairo soon followed on 13 November but was not earnestly pursued, as Almaric was more interested in tribute than conquest. He also feared that Shawar would continue his scorched earth policy as he had done at Fustat, burning the city to the ground rather than turn it over to the Franks. After collecting ransom for captives, Amalric withdrew to Saryaqos, north of Cairo. The Frankish offensive soon unraveled. Amalric assumed that the savage assault on Bilbeis would weaken Cairo's resolve, but the opposite happened. Muslim opposition to the Franks hardened, and Shawar reached out to Nur al-Din for assistance.

By November 1168, a large expeditionary force was assembled south of Damascus under the overall command of Shirkuh. Again, Nur al-Din assigned some trusted warlords to curb any independent, self-serving actions on the part of Shirkuh. Saladin would accompany the host. When Amalric learned of the Syrian force, he mustered his forces at Bilbeis and marched east, hoping to intercept them. Failing in that, he realized he was outnumbered and, humbled, returned to Jerusalem. Egypt now lay open to the Syrians.

In early January 1169, Shawar made desperate attempts at negotiating with the Syrians but his base of support had been eroded by his embrace of the Franks. Even though the Syrians were Sunni, the traditional enemies of the Egyptian Shi'ites, they were preferable to the Christian Latins. On 18 January, Shawar rode to Shirkuh's camp to continue discussions when he was ambushed by a party led by Saladin and murdered. His head was brought to the caliph who had days earlier expressed a preference for the Syrian. Shirkuh rode triumphantly into Cairo, but was met by an angry mob. He made it to the caliph's palace and was appointed vizier.

=== Saladin as Egyptian vizier ===
Nur al-Din was pleased at the outcome of Shirkuh's expedition as it confirmed a Zengid foothold in Egypt, forming a gauntlet around the Frankish settlements. But, barely two months later, Shirkuh died of natural causes. Saladin was inaugurated as vizier on 26 March 1169. Opposition to a Kurd occupying such a prominent position was fierce. A group of Egyptian soldiers and emirs plotted an assassination, but the conspirators were caught and executed. Days later, on 21 August, a large group of soldiers staged what is known as the Battle of the Blacks, opposing Saladin and his rule. The revolt was quickly quelled and Saladin never again faced a military challenge in Cairo.

Saladin exceeded all expectations in his new role as vizier to the caliph, balancing that with his loyalty to his overlord Nur al-Din. Born Yusaf ibn Ayyub, he became known then as Salah al-Din, the "goodness of faith", or Saladin to the Western world.

=== Disaster at Damietta ===
Almaric wasted no time in challenging the new vizier. Embassies to the West urging a new crusade were unsuccessful, but were well received in Constantinople. On 10 July 1169, a Byzantine fleet under the command of Andronikos Kontostephanos set sail for Cyprus, to await the Frankish force. But Almaric was not ready, but by October the expeditionary force was prepared to depart. The Christian armada departed Cyprus on 16 October arriving in Egypt on 25 October.

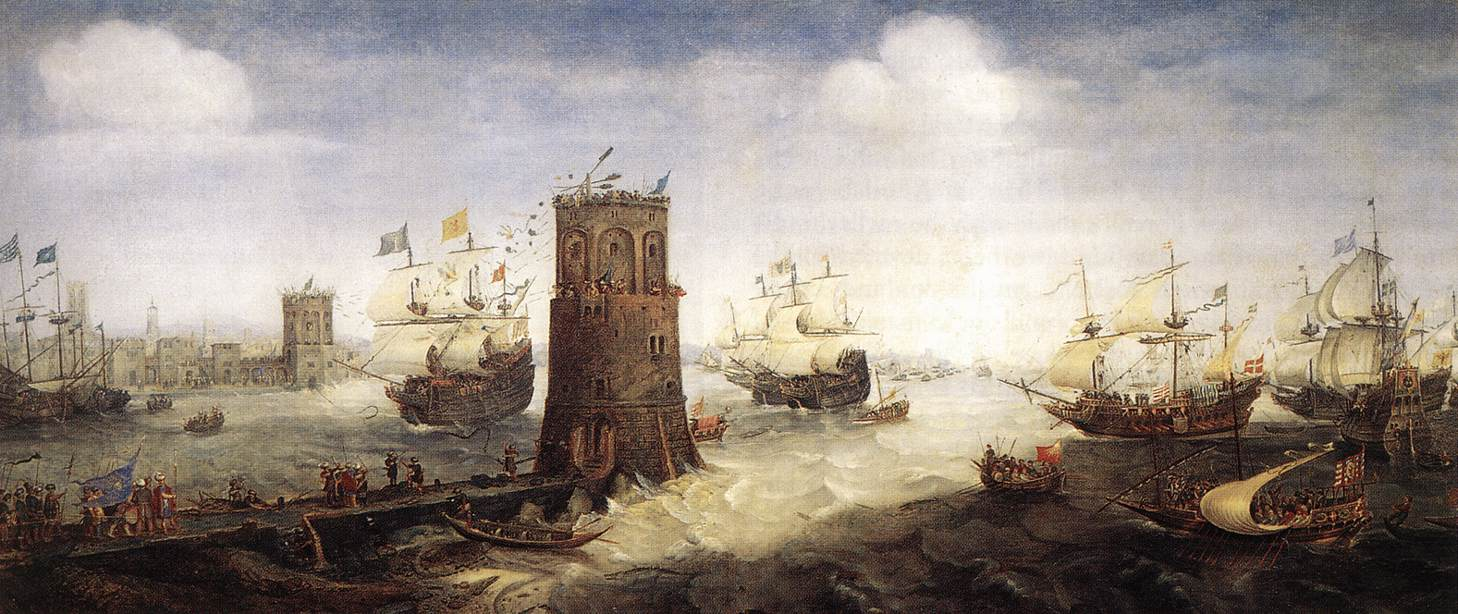
Damietta

Saladin had advance notice of the invasion and assigned the Egyptian defense to his nephew Taqi al-Din. It was assumed they would first attack Bilbeis. Instead, they sailed towards Damietta, taking Saladin by surprise. The protective chain in the city's harbor prevented the fleet from advancing and so a ground assault on the fortress was begun. Kontostephanos urged quick action because of dwindling rations for his men, but Amalric hesitated, wanting to build more siege engines. In the meantime, the garrison at Damietta was supplied fresh troops and supplies. A Syrian army had been dispatched by Nur al-Din and met up with the Egyptian defenders.

The Christian commanders negotiated a settlement and on 13 December 1169, the Franks burned their siege engines and departed Egypt. Almaric's troops reached Ascalon on 24 December, but the Byzantine fleet, sailing north, were devastated by a major storm, destroying most of the ships. The surviving ships returned to Constantinople. Recriminations flew between the Byzantines and Franks, each blaming the other for the disaster.

=== Lord of Egypt ===
The Franks loss at Damietta did not damper the hostilities between Egypt and Jerusalem. But the 1170 Syria earthquake, struck in June, devastating a large portion of northern Syria, killing thousands of Muslims and Christians alike. Many churches and castles were also destroyed.

By the winter, Saladin was again on the offensive against the Franks. On 10 December 1170, he began a siege of Darum in the Gaza Strip, the Franks southernmost fortress on the Mediterranean. Lasting two days, Saladin gained entrance into one of the towers but did not take the town. Eight days later, Amalric counterattacked causing Saladin to retreat and turn his attention to Gaza City. Amalric carried the relic of the True Cross into this battle, continuing a tradition since 1101. The town was captured and sacked but the citadel held. Saladin then reversed course and headed south towards Ayla, modern Aqaba, on the Red Sea. The Egyptian troops began the Siege of Ayla from both land and sea, successfully capturing Ayla and Pharaoh's Island on 31 December 1170. Saladin garrisoned the stronghold and returned to Cairo in February 1171.

Saladin gradually assumed total leadership over Cairo and al-Adid. He installed his confidant Baha al-Din Qaraqush as head of the palace, essentially securing control over the caliph and his staff. In June 1171, Nur al-Din directed Saladin to reestablish a Sunni Abbasid caliphate in Egypt which was accomplished in phases. On 10 September, the traditional call to prayers in Cairo publicly proclaimed the name of the Abbasid caliph al-Mustadi instead of al-Adid's. Al-Adid likely never learned of this dramatic change, being on his deathbed due to a severe illness. He died on 13 September 1171 at the age of twenty, sealing the end of the Fatimid Caliphate. Saladin was now the lord of Egypt. (Note: Saladin was informally known as "the sultan" from the beginning of his vizarate. Some regard the title as starting in 1174, but it is clear that he ruled Egypt from the time of the death of al-Adid.)

== Consolidation and expansion ==
The Ayyubid dynasty was thus founded, destined to last nearly a century. Saladin's challenges were enormous. He must stabilize his hold on Egypt and then expand the Ayyubid influence to his neighbours, all while maintaining good terms with his superior Nur al-Din. After Nur al-Din's death in 1174, he took to conquering Syria, from which he would have the Franks encircled and could confidently move on them.

=== Growth of the Ayyubid dynasty ===
One of Saladin's first priorities was to shore up the army to defend Egypt against a myriad of enemies. As Saladin was still a subordinate of Nur al-Din, keeping the relationship strong between the two leaders was of the utmost importance. Nur al-Din was in many ways dissatisfied with Saladin. In particular, the tribute paid from Egypt to Syria was insufficient in Nur al-Din's eyes. He also was leary that Saladin would seek independence.

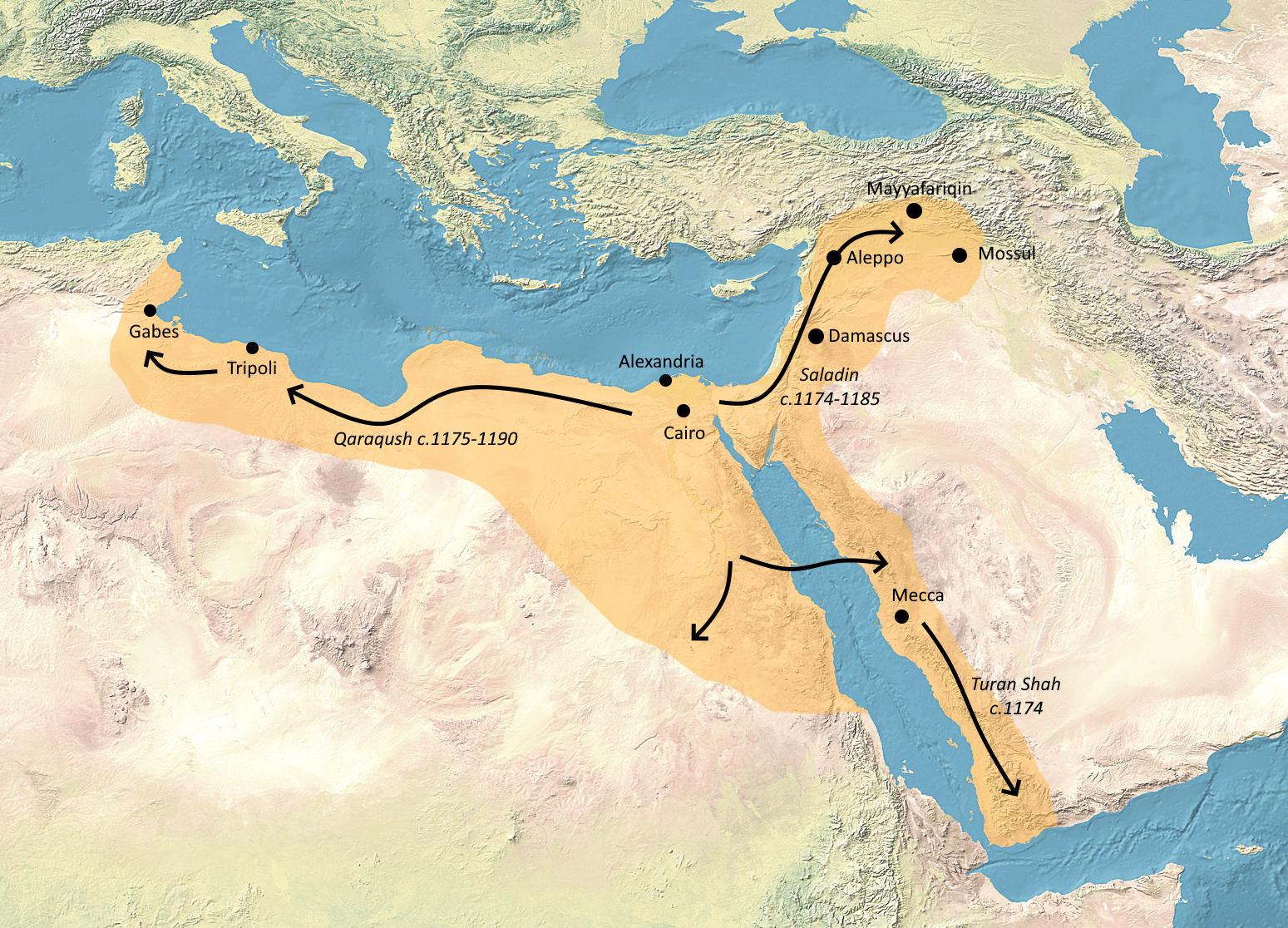
Ayyubid expansion, including the campaigns of Saladin, Taqi al-Din, Qaranqush and Turan-Shah.

On 21 September 1171, Saladin left Cairo for a joint attack on the Frankish castle of Montréal, with Nur al-Din who would attack from Syria. Prior to arriving at Montréal, Saladin withdrew back to Cairo as he received reports of treachery in the realm–Fatimids who were plotting to restore their past glory. Because of this, Nur al-Din went on alone, but was suspicious and resolved to solve this problem militarily. Saladin, upon hearing this disturbing news, wrote to Nur al-Din reaffirming his submission to Syria. This resolved the situation, for the time being. A similar joint attack against the fortress at Kerak would occur in May 1173, where Saladin rushed to Cairo as his father lay dying. Nur al-Din accepted Saladin's explanation that he feared an uprising, but remained wary.

In order to cement his control over Cairo's bureaucracy, Saladin brought many of his relatives to his side, his father Ayyub ibn Shādhi having come in 1170. They also contributed to the expansion of the Ayyubid dynasty. His nephew Taqi al-Din expanded the empire southward to Nubia while his brother Turan-Shah conquered Yemen and Arabia. Eventually, Sharaf al-Din Qaraqush, a commander under Taqi al-Din, pushed westward towards Tunisia. By 1174, all that remained to conquer was Syria and Palestine.

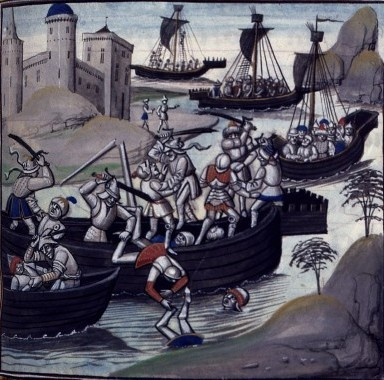
Siege of Alexandria

Saladin's enemies were everywhere. In late 1173, a plot was brewing to restore the Fatimids to power in Cairo. The Pro-Fatimid conspiracy against Saladin was quelled by 31 March 1174. Later that year, on 28 July, the Normans of Sicily launched the unsuccessful Siege of Alexandria led by Tancred of Lecce. The siege was put down by early August and the Normans returned home.

=== Deaths of Nur al-Din and Amalric ===
The year 1174 was a pivotal one in the Levant with the deaths of Nur al-Din and Amalric. Nur al-Din died on 15 May leaving his Syrian empire to be controlled by his close relatives. Amalric died a short time later, on 11 July, and was succeeded by his son Baldwin IV of Jerusalem, the leper king. In Syria, Nur al-Din's son as-Salih Ismail al-Malik ruled Damascus and Aleppo while his nephew Sayf al-Din Ghazi II was emir of Mosul. None would be able to withstand the assaults of Saladin.

=== Occupation of Damascus ===
Nur al-Din did not intend on Saladin being his successor, instead looking to his eleven-year-old son as-Salih. After his death, the Aleppean atabeg Gumushtigin assumed custody of the child and moved him and his mother to Aleppo. In the meantime, a group of emirs headed by ibn al-Muqaddam seized control of Damascus, asking in vain for help from Sayf al-Din II in staving off the inevitable attacks. Almaric acted first, taking this opportunity to besiege Banias, a frontier settlement lost to the Syrians a decade before. The siege lasted two weeks without success when the king fell ill and agreed to a truce. He died shortly thereafter.

Saladin marched from Egypt in October 1174, towards Syria. He approached the issue of Damascus diplomatically, stessing his allegiance to as-Salih and his family roots in the city. The feeling grew among the Syrian emirs was that Saladin offered the best hope of survival in light of Frankish aggression. Granting Saladin favorable terms, he triumphantly entered Damascus on 28 October 1174. (Note: Other sources show a date of 27 November 1174 of Saladin's entry into Damascus.) His brother Turan-Shah was installed as governor. In addition to Damascus, Saladin's rule was extended to Homs, Hama and Baalbek. (Note: For his role in negotiating the surrender of Damascus, ibn al-Muqaddam was awarded the lordship of Baalbek.) This bloodless campaign was a success.

=== Compromise at Aleppo ===
Saladin then turned his attention to Aleppo, which would not prove to be as pliant as Damascus. Gumushtigin and his charge as-Salih were the legitimate rulers of the city, rallying the citizens to not submit to the Ayyubids. Besides having a strong garrison and citadel, Aleppo formed had an alliance with Mosul under Sayf al-Din II, as-Salih's uncle, to oppose Saladin. In addition, Raymond III of Tripoli, regent to the boy-king Baldwin IV, knowing that Saladin must be stopped, joined the Muslim alliance. Later, Bohemond III of Antioch also joined the alliance.

On 9 December 1174, Saladin took the city of Homs, although the garrison holding the citadel remained. He then left for Hama, and finally to Aleppo where Gumushtigin rejected his overtures. Raymond marched on Homs, and, supported by the garrison in the citadel, began their siege of the city on 1 February 1175. Saladin paused his action at Aleppo and marched south to confront the Franks, forcing a month-long siege by Saladin to take the city. Grateful for the Franks support, Gumushtigin released Raynald of Châtillon, Joscelin III of Courtenay and other Christian hostages, held for many years.

Mosul then sprang into action with Sayf al-Din II sending his brother Izz al-Din with an army to confront Saladin. The opposing Muslim forces met near Hama in April 1175 with Saladin defeating the Mowlawis. A truce was declared that would last exactly one year. At that time, Sayf al-Din II would himself lead a force from Mosul joining the Aleppean troops. On 13 April 1176, this combined force would engage with Saladin at the Battle of the Horns of Hama. (Note: Assassins would make attempts on Saladin's life in the midst of these two battles as described in Section 3.5.) Mosul general Keukburi would distinguish himself in battle, but ultimately Saladin emerged victorious. (Note: Keukburi (Gökböri) would later join Saladin's army and go on to rule parts of the Ayyubid empire.)

The battles were victories for the sultan but inconclusive, and Saladin sought to minimize inter-Muslim conflict. Hoping to force the issue with Aleppo, he laid siege to the fortress of Azaz, which capitulated on 21 June 1176. By that July, he realized that his ambitions for Aleppo would not be immediately realized, and a truce was negotiated and signed on 29 July. (Note: After the truce with Aleppo was signed, the little sister of as-Salih came out to meet Saladin. He asked what gift she might want and she said, "the Castle of Azaz". The sultan promptly returned Azaz to her brother.)

=== Sultan of Egypt and Syria ===
While Aleppo remained out of reach, Saladin's Syrian adventure gained him control of most of the surrounding countryside. Saladin presented this reality as one that would enhance a united Islamic cause against the Franks. To further his legitimacy, he married Ismat ad-Din Khatun, the widow of Nur al-Din and daughter of Unur.

At this point, Saladin declared his independence from as-Salih Ismail and took the title of Sultan of Egypt and Syria. The Abbasid caliph al-Mustadi approved of this elevation to sultan and sent the appropriate royal robes to Hama. In September 1176, Saladin returned to Egypt.

== Baldwin IV, the leper king of Jerusalem ==
Baldwin IV of Jerusalem had been king since the death of Amalric in 1174, under the regency of first Miles of Plancy (Note: Miles of Plancy was seneschal of the kingdom and automatically became regent to the young king as no other was appointed.) and then Raymond III of Tripoli. On 15 July 1176, he reached his majority and Raymond's regency came to an end. Saladin's push to unite Syria under his rule left the early days of Baldwin's rule with little combat between the two camps. That would come to an end soon.

=== Planned attack on Egypt ===
Surrounded by the Ayyubids, Baldwin IV struck first while Saladin was besieging Aleppo. Having refused to renew the truce between Jerusalem and Damascus, he led a raiding party in early August 1176 into Lebanon's Beqaa Valley. There he surprised troops led by Saladin's older brother Turan-Shah, defeating him in a minor engagement, setting an aggressive tone for his rule.

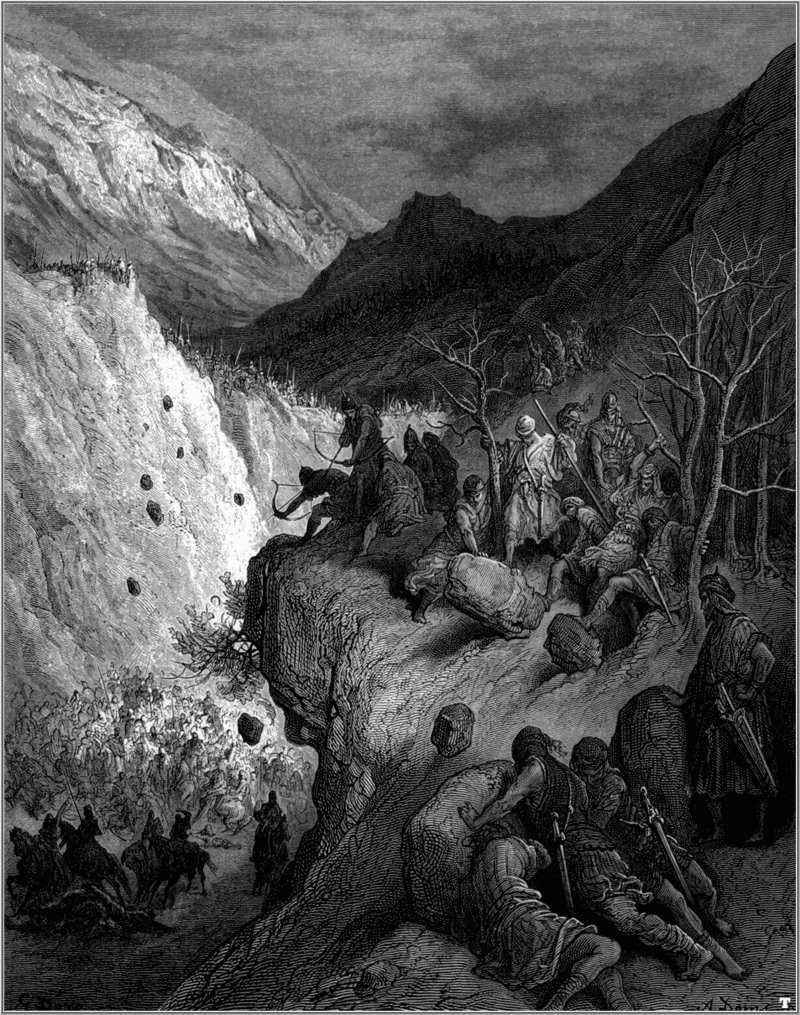
Battle of Myriokephalon by Gustave Doré

In late 1176, Raynald of Châtillon, recently released from captivity, was sent as an envoy to Constantinople. The objective was to form an alliance with the emperor Manuel I Komnenos to confront Saladin. The first planned objective was a combined ground and naval assault on Egypt.

The Byzantine army was unfortunately in shambles. On 17 September 1176, Manuel's army was badly defeated by Kilij Arslan II and his Seljuk Turks at the Battle of Myriokephalon. This strategic defeat was devastating to Byzantium's prestige in Western Europe and the Levant, and the emperor felt that an invasion of Egypt would help reverse this. (Note: Manuel's victory at the 1177 Battle of Hyelion and Leimocheir would help the Byzantine cause, but not totally reverse the loss the previous year.)

The emperor accepted Raynald's proposal for joint action against Egypt in exchange for the Latin kingdom accepting protected status from Byzantine and the restoration of the Greek Orthodox patriarch in Jerusalem. In the summer of 1177, a Byzantine fleet arrived at Acre and met up with a large force led by Phillip I of Flanders. Arguments between Phillip and the Byzantines as to the timing of the planned assault led to the collapse of the agreement.

=== Victory at Montgisard ===
Saladin had amassed a large force in Egypt to defend against the expected Frankish offensive, and in late autumn of 1177, he directed that force to invade Palestine. Setting up a forward command post at al-Arish, Saladin led his force of some 20,000 horsemen north, reaching Ascalon on 22 November. Baldwin IV rode out to meet the invading force, joined by Raynald of Châtillon and Joscelin III of Courtenay, a small force of 600 knights and 3000 infantry, and the bishop of Bethlehem carrying the remnant of the True Cross. With such disadvantageous odds, Baldwin moved his troops into the protective walls of Ascalon, leaving Saladin free to continue unimpeded.

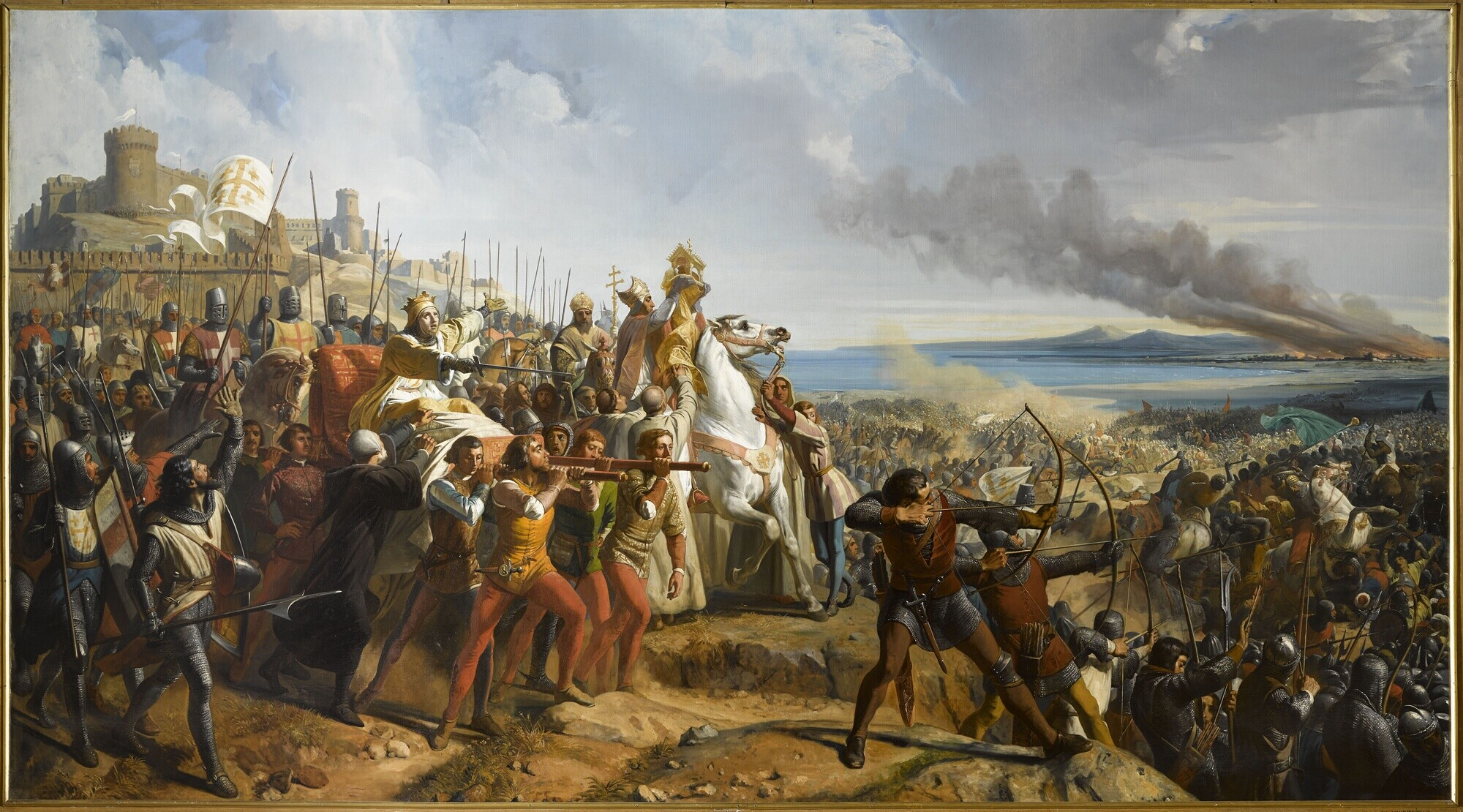
The Battle of Montgisard, 1177, Charles Philippe Larivière, 1842–1844

Saladin's overconfidence would be his undoing in the subsequent engagement. He allow is troops to disperse, foraging near Ramla and Lyyda, and not monitoring the Frankish actions. Baldwin, for his part, summoned a small contingent of some eighty Templars from Gaza under the command of grand master Odo of St Amand. Goaded on by Raynald, Baldwin made the decision to engage Saladin.

On 25 November, the Battle of Montgisard commensed when the Franks charged Saladin's forces in the midst of fording a small river near a hill known as Mont Gisard. Undermanned, the sultan was unable to mount a credible defense and the ranks were broken. Saladin himself was nearly captured, and his fleeing men were hunted down until nightfall gave them a reprise.

The loss to Saladin in both manpower and prestige were significant. His depleted force limped home through ten days of unrelenting rainfall, only to find his forward command post at al-Arish sacked by Bedouins. He returned to Cairo in early December, suffering his worst loss to date.

=== Return of the sultan ===
Among the many problems faced by Saladin after Montigisard was a self-inflicted wound, the incompetence of his brother Turan-Shah as governor of Damascus. In April 1178, he returned home to replace him, putting Faruk-Shah in charge. Turan-Shah demanded the lordship of Baalbek as compensation. Baalbek had been awarded to ibn al-Muqaddam in exchange for his role in negotiating Damascus' surrender four years earlier, and Saladin eventually forced him out and installed his brother. Turan-Shah's proved equally incompetent to manage Baalbek and he was spirited back to Egypt where he died in 1180. Ibn al-Muqaddam remained loyal to the sultan and was welcomed back to his former role.

The uneasy peace held for much of 1178 until that summer when a Latin armed force was raiding villages in the vicinity of Hama. Met by the Ayyubids on 17 August, the ensuing Battle of Hama had the Muslim forces routing the Franks, taking many prisoners. The captives were later executed for their wanton destruction.

In the spring of 1179, Baldwin IV led a raiding party near Banias during the annual migration of sheep from the fields of Damascus. Suspious, Saladin sent his nephew Faruk-Shah with a modest contingent to investigate. On April 10, Faruk-Shah's men caught the Franks by surprise at the Battle of Banias. The Frankish force was overwhelmed, with Baldwin barely escaping. One of the casualties was the constable Humphrey II of Toron who had saved the king's life. He died on 22 April, a great blow to the kingdom.

In order to check Raymond III of Tripoli in the north, Saladin appointed Taqi al-Din to rule Hama and Shirkuh's son Nasir ad-Din at Homs. He was now in a position to launch his spring offensive.

=== Conflicts at Marj Ayyun and Jacob's Ford ===
In autumn 1178, Baldwin IV was looking to control the Upper Jordan region and ordered the construction of a fortress near Jacob's Ford, just a day's march from Damascus. The castle known as Chastelet was a joint venture of the kingdom and the Templars. From October 1178 through its completion April 1179, Baldwin moved the seat of government to the building so he could personally supervise the construction.

Saladin was not happy with this state of affairs. The fortress directly threatened his Ayyubid empire, and Damascus itself. With his troops bogged down in Baalbek, he was in no position to attack the Franks there given its impressive fortifications. He instead offered Baldwin a bribe of 60,000 dinars, later upped to 100,000, to abandon the project. Baldwin refused, and Saladin tested the defenses of the fortress to no avail.

Saladin drew together a sizable force to attack Castelet in the spring of 1179. Part of that force engaged the Franks at Banias as described above. Then on 10 June 1179, he met the Franks and Templars at the Battle of Marj Ayyun. The decisive win by Saladin was prelude his future victories in the Levant. In the ensuing melee, Baldwin was nearly killed, escaping the carnage with the True Cross. The Templar Odo of St Amand was captured, dying in captivity the next year. Additional prisoners included Baldwin of Ibelin and Hugh II of Saint-Omer both of whom were ransomed. Baldwin returned to Jerusalem with his few surviving men.

By late summer, Saladin was prepared to assault Chastelet. On 23 August 1179, he began the Siege of Jacob's Ford by sapping the walls. Baldwin IV was stationed in Tiberias, half-a-days march from the fortress, but did not embark until 29 August. The next day, the walls of the fortress were breached and the defenders slaughtered. Baldwin saw the smoke on the horizon, arriving six hours too late.

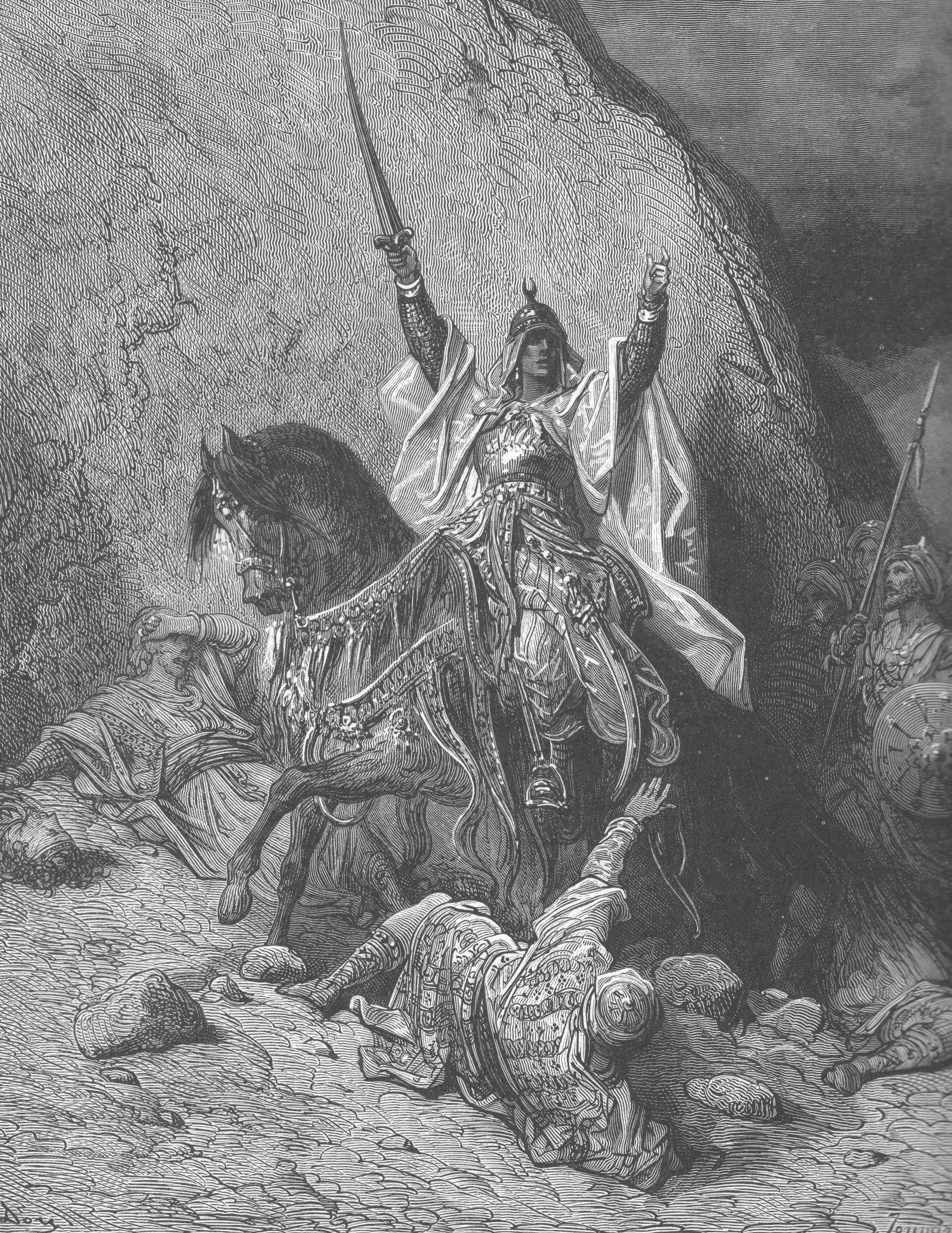
Saladin the Victorious, by Gustave Doré, 1850.

Saladin spent the next two weeks dismantling the fortress stone by stone, even ripping out the foundation. The Franks' momentum on the battlefield had been broken.

=== Two-years' truce between Baldwin IV and Saladin ===
On 14 October 1179, Saladin launched a naval attack on Acre, damaging the port and challenging the Franks' naval supremacy. Shortly thereafter, Baldwin IV asked Saladin for a truce. Saladin agreed and in May 1180, a treaty calling for a two-years' truce was signed by representatives of the two leaders. This would give Saladin time to consolidate his gains in the Muslim world. In a separate action, a truce among the rival Muslim factions in the region was concluded on 2 October 1180.

One of his first actions was to neutralize the growing threat to the north posed by Kilij Arslan II, the Seljuk sultan of Rum, whose influence had grown since Myriokephalon in 1176. In the summer of 1180, Saladin secured alliances with a number of cities in the Upper Euphrates region to contain the Seljuk. He also concluded a non-aggression pact with Roupen III, ruler of Armenian Cilicia, mitigating his opposition to Ayyubid expansion.

The Byzantine Empire suffered the loss of Manuel I Komnenos on 24 September 1180 and his young son assumed the throne. He was soon supplated by Manuel's cousin Andronikos I Komnenos who allowed relations with the Crusader states to decline, serving Saladin's interests. His arrival in Constantinople in April 1182 was coincident with the Massacre of the Latins, furthering the split with Outremer. He later signed a peace treaty with Saladin.

== Sultan of Islam ==
The Islamic East saw dramatic changes beginning in 1180. On 27 March, Abbasid caliph al-Mustadi died. He was succeeded by his son al-Nasir and Saladin took gain pains to cultivate a positive relationship with him. In Mosul, Sayf al-Din II died that summer and his younger brother Izz al-Din Mas'ud succeeded him. More importantly, Nur al-Din's son and heir as-Salih Ismail, the emir of Aleppo, died at the age of nineteen. As-Salih posed a threat to Saladin as a potential leader of Islam and his demise was not unwelcomed. His nephew Imad ad-Din Zengi II assumed power in Aleppo was not going to threaten Saladin's ambitions.

=== Movement into Syria and Upper Mesopotamia ===
The truce held despite an attack by Raynald of Châtillon on an Egyptian caravan in the summer of 1181. Saladin's request to Baldwin IV for compensation was rebuffed and he took a stranded group of pilgrims hostage in response. Still, neither leader broke the spirit of the truce.

By the spring of 1182, Saladin's truce with Baldwin had expired and he set out with his army for Syria, leaving Egyptian affairs in the hands of his brother al-Adil and chamberlain Baha al-Din Qaraqush. Baldwin responded to this troop movement by concentrating his forces at Kerak Castle, but Saladin bypassed them and moved on to Transjordan. At the same time, Faruk-Shah moved against Galilee, capturing the fortress of Cave de Seuth.

By summertime, Saladin engaged the Franks in battle twice. The first was the Battle of Belvoir Castle on 15 July 1182, bloody but inconclusive. For the second, he attacked Beirut by land and sea that August. The battle raged for three days when Baldwin's relief force arrived and Saladin raised the siege. These served to help Saladin gauge the Frankish readiness and military prowess.

During the siege of Beirut, Keukburi, a former general in the service of Mosul, and now emir of Harran in Upper Mesopotamia, switched allegiance to Saladin allowing an Ayyubid base in the Jazira region from which to threaten Mosul. The Muslim truce was about to expire and on 19 September 1182, Saladin began a three-day siege on Aleppo. Crossing the Euphrates, he was joined by Keukburi and Nur ad-Din, emir of Hisn Kayla. Their joint armies proceeded to conquer all the major cities in the Jazira.

=== Mosul denied ===
Map of the Jazira (Upper Mesopotamia), with its provinces, in medieval times showing the strategic location of Mosul (al-Mawsil)

Saladin then moved on to Mosul, beginning his siege of the city on 10 November 1182. Envoys from Abbasid caliph al-Nasir arrived to attempt to broker a peace, but they took a neutral stance that was unacceptable to Saladin. Frustrated, he raised the siege after a solid month and moved to the east to besiege Sinjar, lasting a fortnight. The city capulated on 30 December and was sacked.

From Sinjar, Saladin moved on Diyar Bakr, capturing its well-fortified capital city in April 1183. Mardin then capitulated, effectively isolating Mosul. Izz al-Din and Imad ad-Din attempted to organize a counterattack in February but, lacking resources and commitment, instead sued for peace with Saladin. Saladin refused, preferring to meet on the battlefield, and the Zengid forces returned home. Sensing an opportunity, the Zengid forces regrouped and engaged Saladin. By late April, after three days of fighting, the Ayyubids had captured Amid. (Note: Amid is currently known as Diyarbakir and is the largest Kurdish city in Turkey.) Saladin handed the city over to Nur ad-Din.

Saladin attempted to gain the support of an-Nasir against Izz ad-Din by requesting legal justification for taking over Mosul and its territories. He argued that while he conquered Egypt and Yemen for the Abbasids, the Zengids of Mosul openly supported the Seljuks and only came to the caliph when in need. He also accused Izz ad-Din's forces of disrupting the Muslim jihad against the Franks through alliances and other instruments of diplomacy. Further, Saladin's policies were to minimize conflict among Muslims. He promised that if Mosul was given to him, he would drive the Franks from Jerusalem and conquer the whole of the Levant. In the end, nothing would come of his protestations. Saladin would have to abandon his quest to take Mosul and move on to Aleppo.

Saladin launched his last offensive against Mosul in late 1185, hoping for an easy victory over the weakened Izz al-Din. His assault failed due to the city's unexpectedly stiff resistance and a serious illness which caused Saladin to withdraw to Harran. With encouragement by the caliph, Saladin and Izz al-Din negotiated a treaty in March 1186 that left the Zengids in control of Mosul, but under the obligation to supply the Ayyubids with military support when requested.

=== Saladin's takover of Aleppo ===
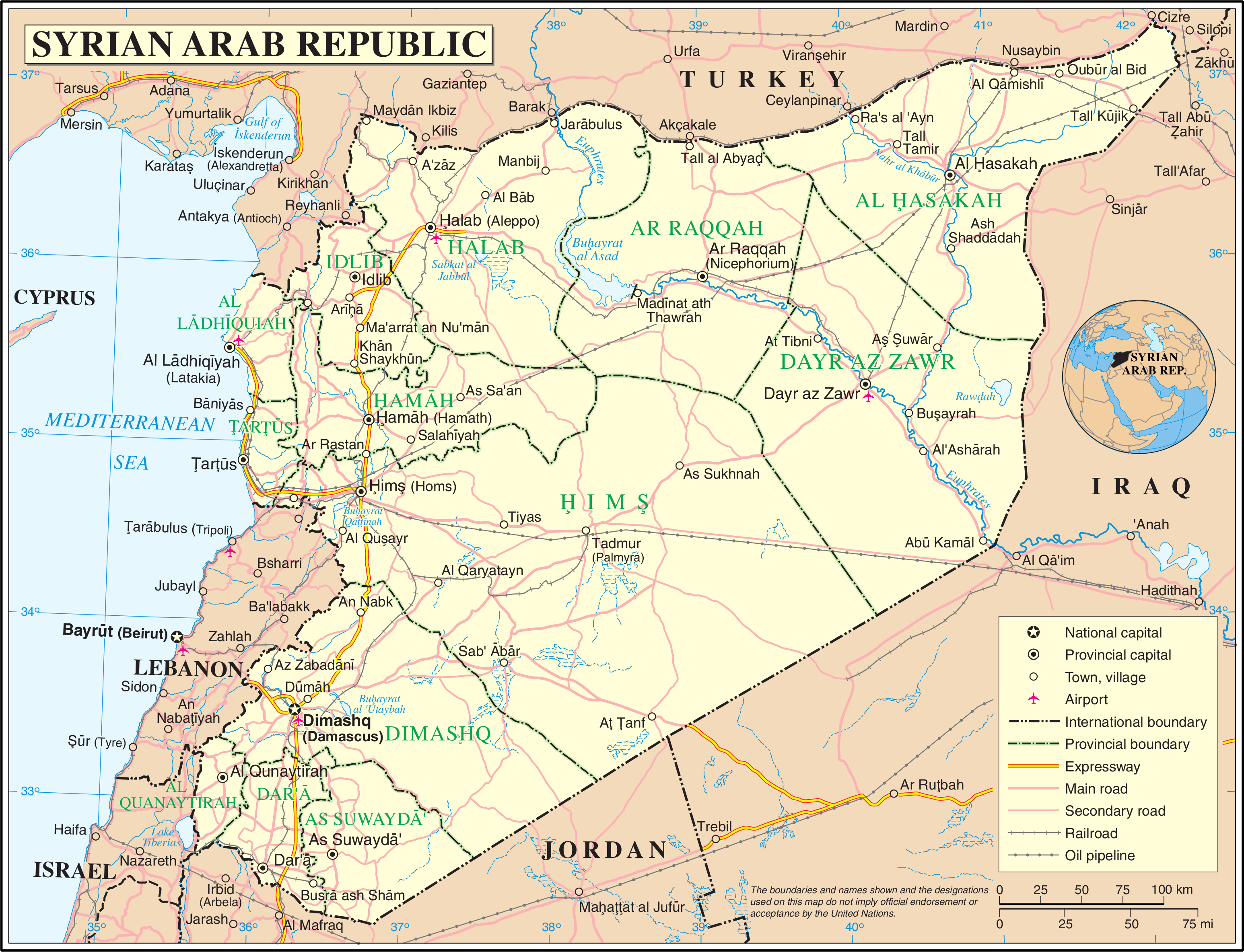
Aleppo (Halab) and surrounding areas

As his military and diplomatic assault on Mosul failed, Saladin turned his attention to Aleppo. On 21 May 1183, he camped outside the city, positioning himself east of the Citadel of Aleppo, while his forces encircled the suburbs to the north and west. He stationed his men dangerously close to the city, hoping for an early success.

Imad ad-Din made minimal effort to resist Saladin's force. He was unpopular with his subjects and wished to return to his native Sinjar, the city he previously governed. An exchange was negotiated where Imad ad-Din would hand over Aleppo to Saladin in return for Sinjar and surroundings. He would hold these territories as a vassal to Saladin in terms of military service. On 12 June 1183, Aleppo was formally placed in Ayyubid hands.

While meeting some resistance, the Aleppans embraced their new lord. Now, with an empire that stretched from Egypt to Syria complete, Saladin could turn his attention back to the Franks.

=== Campaigns at the Red Sea, al-Fule and Kerak ===
While Saladin was occupied with Mosul and Aleppo, the Franks were continuing to challenge Ayyubid gains near the kingdom. In late 1182, they raided the areas around Damascus and Bosra and recaptured the Cave de Sueth. Saladin was prepared for a major invasion, and his intelligence sources predicted the Franks would attack through the muster point at al-Arish. They could not have been more inaccurate.

In fact, from late 1182 through early 1183, Raynald of Châtillon had hatched a more aggressive campaign. The plan was to launch Frankish raids on the Red Sea, reaking havoc throughout the Muslim world. Al-Adil ordered his fleet to the Gulf of Aqaba where they routed the Franks. Raynald fled to Kerak and the remaining sailors imprisoned. To set an example, Saladin had the captives sent singley or in pairs to various cities under his control and publicly executed. The defilement of Arabia had been avenged and Saladin's image as the protector of Islam enhanced. Raynald became a despised enemy.

While Saladin was preparing his attack on Palestine in the autumn of 1183 he knew he was facing a weakened foe. The health of Baldwin IV had deteriorated badly and he turned to his brother-in-law and heir-apparent Guy of Lusignan to lead the Jerusalemite forces against the impending invasion. Baldwin's sister Sibylla had married Guy in April 1180, ostensibly to avoid a planned coup by Raymond III of Tripoli and Bohemond III of Antioch. Guy would then become the presumptive heir to the throne and, for the time being, regent to the ailing king.

Saladin invaded Galilee in late September 1183 and was met by one of the largest Frankish forces ever assembled. As regent, Guy was commander-in-chief of the army and led this force that numbered 1,500 knights and ten-fold number of infantry. Saladin's forces were even larger and the two met at the Battle of al-Fule, beginning on 30 September. Both sides proceeded with caution, with Saladin later withdrawing in hopes of luring Guy to break formation. He did not pursue, and a stalemate ensued for a week when Saladin withdrew his men on 6 October. With the Muslims retreating back across the Jordan River, the Christians had survived the first assault.

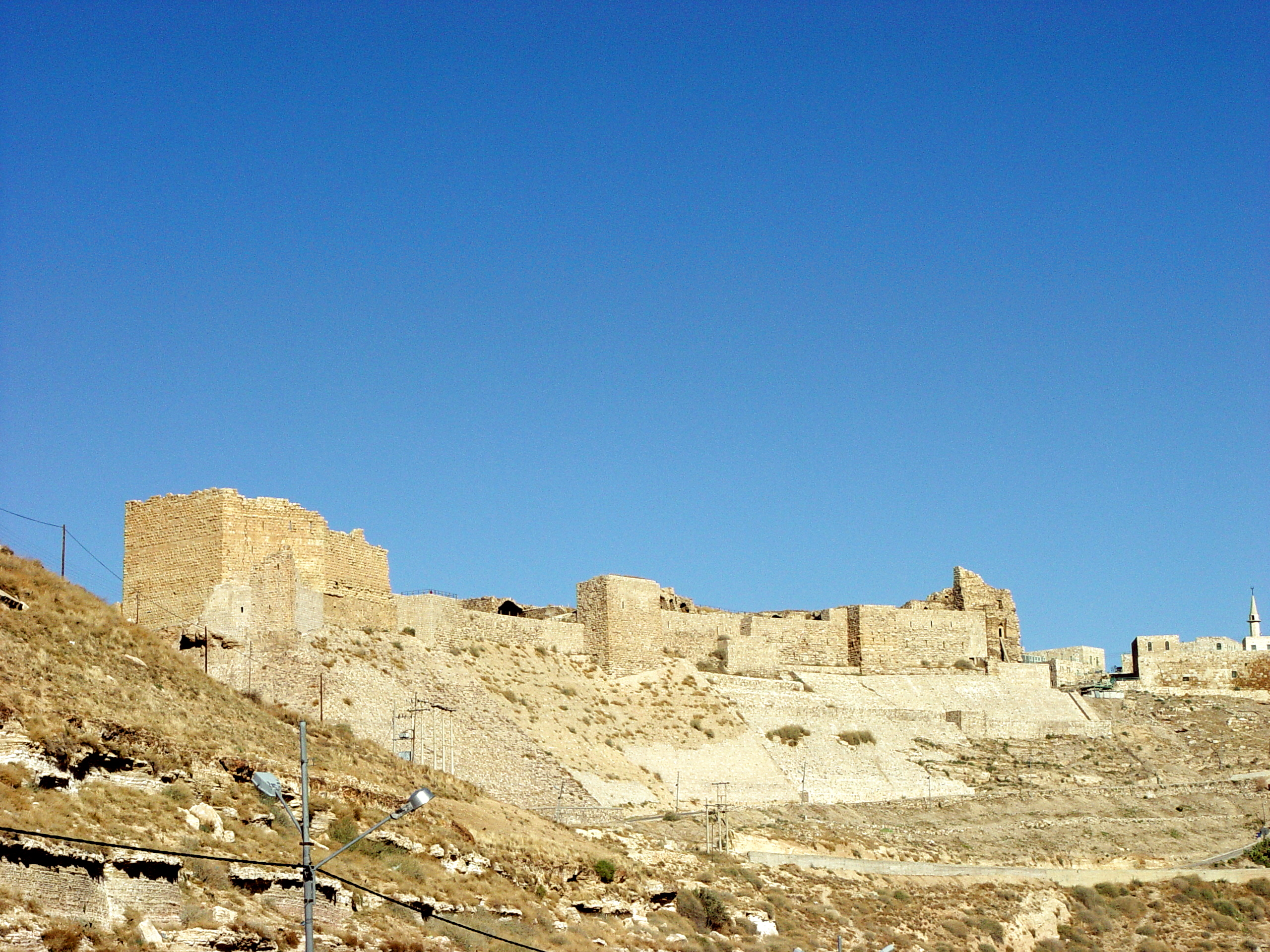
Kerak Castle

Within the month, on 22 October 1183, Saladin moved south to begin the Siege of Kerak, with the fortress defended by his archenemy Raynald of Châtillon. He brought a large, well-equipped force that included heavy siege weapons and was augmented by a supporting Egyptian army led by al-Adil. (Note: Al-Adil was en route to Syria to assume the lordship of a newly conquered area.) The siege was coincidental with the marriage ceremony at the castle of the king's half-sister Isabella and Raynald's step-son Humphrey IV of Toron. As many nobles were in attendance, Saladin may have eyed capturing such august personages that would fetch large ransoms.

As the siege began in early November, Jerusalem was alerted to the need for a relief force. This came in the middle of a succession crisis in which Guy of Lusignan was replaced as heir by the king's nephew Baldwin V of Jerusalem who also became co-king. With this accomplished, Baldwin IV set out with the royal army to Kerak under the overall command of Raymond III. Saladin, unable to breach the dry moat surrounding the castle, withdrew his forces on 3 December 1183.

Saladin would again try to take Kerak, beginning a siege on 22 August 1184, with a royal relief force responding as before. After some minor raids, he returned with his army to Damascus, sending his Egyptian force home. That same year, he was offered a four-year truce by Raymond which he accepted.

=== Transitions in the kingdom and the sultanate ===
Baldwin IV died on 16 May 1185 and his heir Baldwin V became sole king. The son of William Longsword and Sibylla, Baldwin V had been co-king with his uncle since 20 November 1183. He assumed the throne at the age of eight years, and had Raymond III of Tripoli as his regent. As sagas go, the reign of Baldwin V was unremarkable given the truce negotiated with Saladin in 1184, and he died in the summer of 1186.

Sibylla and her husband Guy of Lusignan returned to Jerusalem for her son's funeral. She was crowned queen by the patriarch of Jerusalem, Heraclius, and nobles including Raynald of Châtillon and the Templar and Hospitaller grand masters. Before she was crowned, she agreed to annul her marriage to Guy with the proviso that she could freely pick her next husband. As queen, she shocked the Jerusalem nobility by choosing to remarry Guy, and so he became king.

Saladin's failures at Kerak and subsequent truce with the Franks put his main focus on Mosul. His last offensive against the city in the winter of 1185 failed, but did lead to a treaty that allied Mosul with the Ayyubids. Having fallen ill in December 1185, Saladin retired to Harran for a fitful recovery. Sensing an opportunity, the emir of Homs Nasir ad-Din ibn Shirkuh began amassing an army to take Damascus. By late February, the sultan's illness had waned and, perhaps coincidentally, Nasir ad-Din was dead. The stage was set for the final battles between Guy of Lusignan and Saladin.

== Fall of the kingdom ==
Guy of Lusignan took the crown facing both external and internal opponents. Saladin was amassing his armies to invade Palestine and, as a counter, Guy renewed his treaty with the sultan until April 1187. Guy's abrasive personality and method of election did not sit well with the kingdom's nobles. His most powerful enemy within was Raymond III of Tripoli, who took the treasonous step of offering Saladin safe passage in Galilee.

=== Raynald of Châtillon breaks the truce ===
Caravans regularly maintained commercial lines of communications between Syria and Egypt and were protected by mutual agreement. Raynald of Châtillon, guilty of attacking a large caravan in 1181, did so again in late 1186, effectively breaking the truce between Saladin and Guy. Raynald's troops killed the soldiers accompanying the caravan and spirited the goods and merchants to Kerak. According to Ibn al-Athir:

Prince Reynald, lord of Kerak, was one of the greatest and wickedest of the Franks, the most hostile to the Muslims and the most dangerous to them. Aware of this, Saladin targeted him with blockades time after time and raided his territory occasion after occasion. As a result he was abashed and humbled and asked Saladin for a truce, which was granted. The truce was made and duly sworn to. Caravans then went back and forth between Syria and Egypt. [In the year 582 AH], a large caravan, rich in goods and with many men, accompanied by a good number of soldiers, passed by him. The accursed one treacheously seized every last man and made their goods, animals and weapons his booty. Those he made captive he consigned to his prisons. Saladin sent blaming him, deploring his treacherous action and threatening him if he did not release the captives and the goods, but he would not agree to do that and persisted in his refusal. Saladin vowed that, if ever had him in his power, he would kill him.

Saladin's demands for restitution of the stolen goods were unmet and as an immediate response, he besieged Kerak, again unsuccessfully. Whether Raynald operated by pure greed or the provoke the sultan is uncertain, but the result was predictable. Raynald's reputation as Islam's worst enemy was cemented and Saladin was provided with a clear rational to attack the Franks in force.

=== Spring of the Cresson ===
The reaction to Raynald's attack on the caravan was swift. Bohemond III of Antioch quickly renewed his truce with Sadadin. In addition, Raymond III of Tripoli made a truce for his county and extended it to the Principality of Galilee where his wife Eschiva of Bures ruled. Further, he secured Saladin's support for making himself king. These treasonous actions by Raymond threatened civil war in the kingdom.

As Galilee was a vassal of the kingdom, Guy began preparations for an invasion of Nazareth, encouraged by Gerard of Ridefort, Templar grand master. He was persuaded to stand down by Balian of Ibelin who pointed out that Raymond's troops in Tiberias, if supported by Saladin, had a superior force than Jerusalem's. It was decided that an embassy be sent to negotiate with Raymond. The delegation was led by Balian and Gerard, and included Roger de Moulins, Hospitaller grand master, Reginald Grenier, and Joscius of Tyre. They were accompanied by a small group of Hospitallers, departing on 29 April 1187.

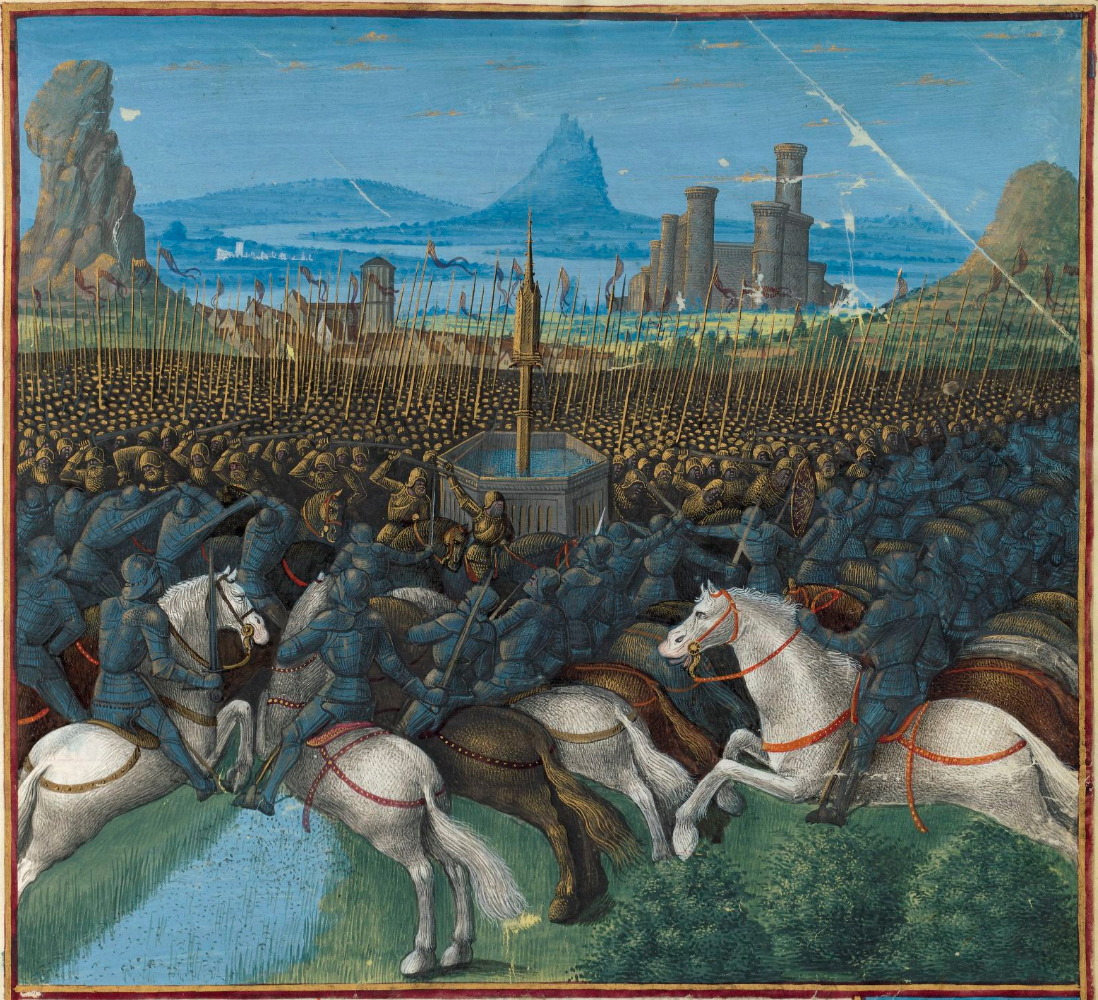
The Battle of Cresson, miniature by Jean Colombe, in Passages d'outremer, c. 1474

At the same time, a large Muslim force under the command of the emir Keukburi had stopped at Banias. Needing to traverse Raymond's land in Galilee, Keukburi sent al-Afdal ibn Salah ad-Din to secure permission to cross. Raymond had stipulated that Saladin's could army could cross that morning and return by nightfall, leaving the towns or villages unharmed. The morning of 1 May 1187, having just heard of Guy's delegation, he watched Keukburi and a force of 7000 pass by. (Note: The force size estimates range from 700 to 7000.) The Battle of Cresson was about to begin.

The delegation at this point had grown to 140 knights, including 90 Templars that were added to the group from their castles at Le Fève and Caco. In Nazareth, the knights passed over a hill and saw the Muslims watering their horses at the Springs of Cresson below. Despite being advised to retreat, Gerard ordered a charge of his cavalry into Keukburi's troops. The ensuing massacre saw all the Templars killed but three, including Gerard. As they rode back through Tiberias, the vanguard had the slain knights' heads affixed to their lances.

In the aftermath, Raymond annulled his treaty with Saladin and rode south to Jerusalem. Guy welcomed him back to the fold and the kingdom was united once again.

=== Horns of Hattin ===
By May 1187, two great armies were assembling. In the Hauran, Saladin had gathered forces from throughout his sultanate, with two subordinate commanders in his nephew Taqi al-Din and the emir Keukburi. Across the Jordan River, Guy of Lusignan had summoned all the Outremer forces to meet at him at Acre. Knights from the Templars, Hospitallers, Antioch and Tripoli joined the king's army which was accompanied by the relic of the True Cross.

These armies were the largest ever fielded in the Levant. Saladin's army is estimated to be numbered 30,000, which included 12,000 cavalry. Guy's army numbered 20,000 of which 1200 were knights.

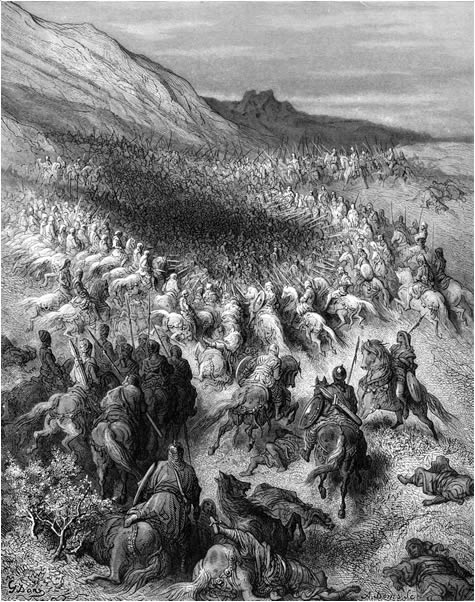
Battle of Hattin, by Gustave Doré, 1850.

On 1 July 1187, Saladin's forces crossed the Jordan and encamped at Kafr Sebt. He then led a contingent to besiege Tiberias. The city fell easily, but Eschiva of Bures and the surviving Frankish soldiers held out in the citadel. The next day, Guy moved his army to Sepphoris, 20 miles to the west of the Sea of Galilee. Saladin had hoped to lure Guy from his fortified position to an area where water was scarce and his army would be have the advantage. There was a heated debate among the Frankish nobles as to the wisdom of relieving Tiberias, but in the end, Guy won the day and his army left Sepphoris on the morning of 3 July.

The vanguard of the army was led by Raymond III of Tripoli as he was the lord of Tiberias. The center was led by Guy and Raynald of Châtillon, with the Templars and Hospitallers at the rear. There was no water, and men and horses alike were suffering. Along the way, Muslim archers rained arrows continually on the Christian troops. By afternoon, they had reached the Horns of Hattin and Guy ordered a halt, choosing to stay the night and proceed in the morning. They spent the night in misery, with the well dry and Saladin's soldiers taunting them continually. The brush surrounding the Franks was set on fire, and smoke permeated their camp. The Frankish encampment was encircled by the Muslims.

On 4 July 1187, the Battle of Hattin began shortly after dawn with a Muslim assault on the Franks' camp. Guy's army was hemmed in by the adjacent hills and the fires, and its soldiers suffered from dehydration. The Franks fought valiantly, but in the end, most were killed or taken captive. The True Cross was lost to the Muslims. A few managed to escape including Balian of Ibelin, Reginald Grenier and Raymond III of Tripoli.

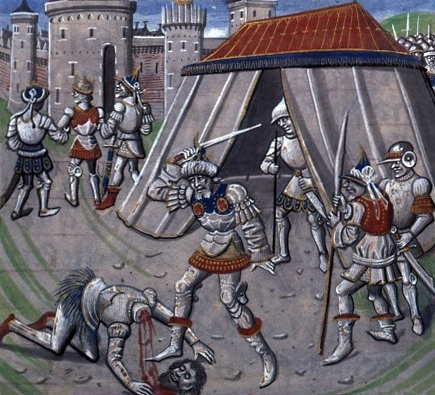
Execution of Raynald at Hattin (from a 15th-century manuscript of William of Tyre's Historia and its Continuation)

Guy of Lusignan and Raynald of Châtillon were taken captive, along with Guy's brother Aimery, his stepson Humphrey IV of Toron, and Templar grand master Gerard of Ridefort. Brought to the tent of Saladin, the sultan offered Guy a goblet of water, but refused the same to Raynald, as Arab customs dictated. Raynald was the executed, perhaps by Saladin himself. The nobles were taken to Damascus where they were eventually released. Other captives were thrust into slavery. The Templars and Hospitallers that were captured were all executed.

The greatest army ever fielded by the Christians in the Holy Land had been crushed by the Muslim invaders. The True Cross had been seized, an affront to Christians everywhere, and was inverted on a lance and taken to Damascus. As a memorial, Saladin erected a triumphal dome on the Horns of Hattin, the ruins of which can still be seen.

=== Palestine conquered, mostly ===
The remainder of Frankish Levant still awaited conquest. On 5 July 1187, Eschiva of Bures surrendered Tiberias to Saladin, knowing that no help was coming her way. She and her household were granted safe passage where she joined her husband.

Saladin then moved to Acre. Joscelin of Courtenay was in command of the city, and offered Saladin its surrender if the lives of residents could be spared. Riots ensued but to no avail, as the city was turned over to the Muslims on 10 July. Baha al-Din Qaraqush was given the task to refortify Acre. While Saladin stayed at the conquered city, his troops swept up the towns and castles in Galilee and Samaria. The garrison at Nablus and held out for several days before capitulating. The castle at Toron lasted longer—a fortnight—before its garrison surrendered.

In the meantime, al-Adil led a force from Egypt to lay siege to Jaffa. The city resisted surrendering and so was taken by force, with the surviving women and children sent into slavery. Joining Saladin, they moved to Tyre. The city's fortifications were formidable and, after a brief siege, their army moved on to Sidon. They garrison there surrendered without a fight on 29 July, with its lord Reginald Grenier fleeing to Beaufort Castle. Beirut put up some resistance but capitulated on 6 August. Shortly thereafter, Hugh III Embriaco surrendered Jebail to Saladin and was released.

In September 1187, Saladin approached Ascalon with his captives Guy of Lusignan and Gerard of Ridefort. Guy's release was dependent on the capitulation of the city, and he pleaded with the residents to give up the fight. They refused and the city was taken by force on 4 September. The residents were spared and escorted to Egypt where they were repatriated to the West. Going on to the Templar fortress at Gaza, Gerard ordered the garrison to surrender and they complied. He was then released.

Guy was kept prisoner and was joined by Sibylla. They were released the next spring but denied access to Tyre by Conrad of Montferrat. The only cities in the kingdom remaining to be conquered were Jerusalem and Tyre, plus assorted isolated castles.

=== Fall of Jerusalem ===
Saladin faced the choice of which of the two remaining cities would he attack. Winter was approaching and he would have time for only one. His fear was that a protracted siege of Tyre would be challenging and failure could fracture his army. In the end, Jerusalem held Islam's most sacred sites outside of Arabia and the power of jihad in motivating his forces drove his decision.

Saladin began his Siege of Jerusalem on 20 September 1187. He had brought tens of thousands of troops and heavy siege engines, necessary for a prolonged attack. Jerusalem's defenses were led by Balian of Ibelin, who had recently arrived from Tyre. (Note: Balian of Ibelin had been granted passage to Jerusalem to escort his wife Maria Komnene and family to safety.) Supported by Sibylla and the patriarch Heraclius, he set about to remedy the paucity of fighting men in the city by knighting every able-bodied man over the age of 16 and strengthing fortifications where possible.

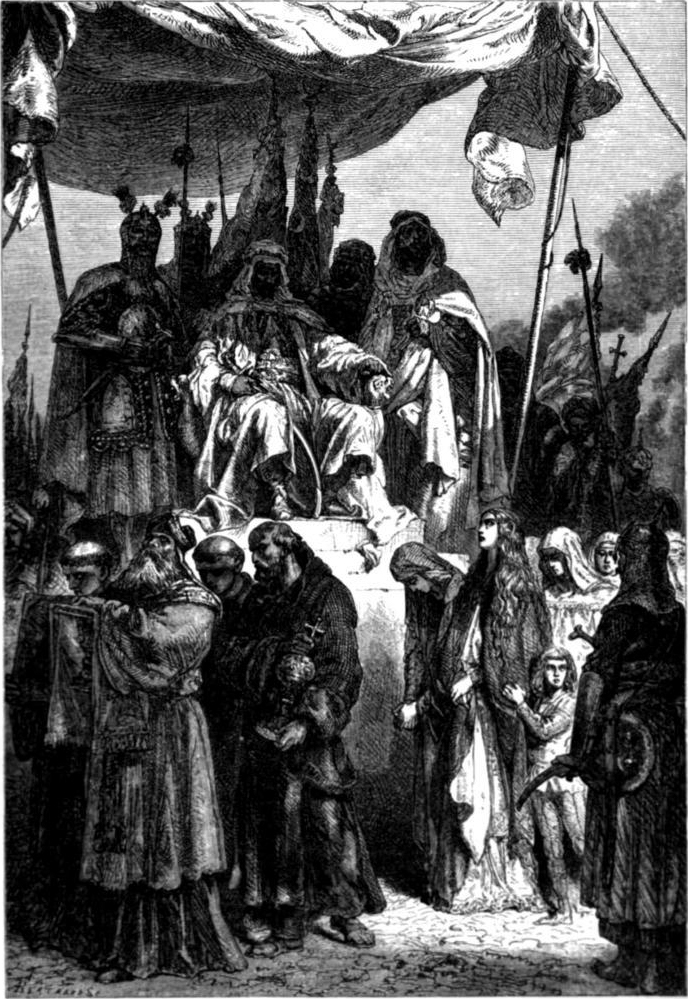
Saladin and Christians of Jerusalem, illustration by François Guizot (1883)

After five fruitless days of siege against the western walls of the city, Saladin shifted his forces to the more vulnerable northern section near the Damascus Gate. By 29 September, sappers had formed a breach in the walls and the city was now open to the sultan's forces. Jerusalem would soon fall and subject to sack by the Ayyubids.

On 30 September, Balian went to Saladin's tent to offer terms of surrender. He had little to offer, but could wreak havoc on the city, including destroying sites holy to Muslims. As an alternative, the inhabitants would pay for their safe passage out. After much haggling, Saladin accepted Balian's proposal and entered the city on 2 October 1187.

The terms of surrender were harsh. The price of freedom was ten dinars for a man, 5 for a woman and 1 for a child. The Christian population had forty days to pay and would be safe conduct to Tyre or Tripoli. Not all were able to pay and then would be sent into slavery. In all, some 15,000 residents were not ransomed and so enslaved. Steady streams of refuges were escorted to the coast.

Jerusalem was now in Islamic hands once again and Saladin took to de-Christianizing the city and restoring Muslim sites to their former glory.

Having achieved his major goal in the capture of Jerusalem, Saladin turned his attention back to Tyre. In the months since Hattin, Conrad of Montferrat had arrived at the city and began bolstering its defenses. On 12 November 1187, Saladin began his Siege of Tyre by land and by sea. But the city held and on 1 January 1188, the siege was lifted and the Muslim army returned to Acre.

=== Saladin triumphant ===
Saladin knew that his capture of Jerusalem would provoke a strong response in the West, perhaps even a major crusade. Tyre remained in Frankish hand and there was still a formidable presence in isolated castles, estimated to be in the hundreds. The Crusader states of Tripoli and Antioch were still a threat and there was much work remaining.

Map presenting Tyre and the regions of Antioch and Tripoli as the last remnants of the Crusader states c. 1190

The fortress at Kerak remained in the hands of the Franks. Saladin had begun his Siege of Kerak in May 1187 even before Jerusalem. Surrounded by Muslim forces, the garrison could do little but defend the castle itself, and he decided the best approach was to starve them into submission. As an historical curiosity, Stephanie of Milly, widow of Raynald of Châtillon, was lady of Transjordan and so the strongholds of Kerak and Montreal fell under her domain. She approached Saladin with the proposition to free her son Humphrey IV of Toron, captured at Hattin, in exchange for the fortresses. When the offer was presented at Kerak, the garrison refused. They lasted for eighteen months before surrendering to the Ayyubids in November 1188. Montreal fell some months later in May 1189.

On 1 July 1188, Saladin moved north to Lebanon, passing through the Buqaia Valley. He bypassed the fortress Krak des Chevaliers, deemed to strong to attack. Tripoli was his next target, but William II of Sicily had recently agreed to defend the county and sent a fleet led by Admiral Margaritus of Brindisi, detering the sultan. He moved on to the Templar fortress at Tortosa where he easily took the town but the castle held steady. The Hospitaller fortress at Marqab also rebuffed Saladin.

Antioch was not so lucky, losing most of the principality to the Ayyubids. Jabala surrendered on 15 July 1188 and by 22 July, the Siege of Latakia had been successful. This was followed by the Siege of Sahyun Castle which began on 26 July. Defended by grand master Armengol de Aspa, this vast Hospitaller stronghold fell in just three days.

Two castles were captured after the Siege of al-Shughur on 9 August 1188 after a four-day battle. This was followed by the successfyl Siege of Bourzey Castle from 20 to 23 August. When the Templar fortresses at Bagras fell on 26 August after the Siege of Trapessac, the prince of Antioch Bohemond III sued for peace, offering Saladin the release of his Muslim captives in exchange for a truce. A truce from 1 October 1188 through 31 May 1189 was negotiated, leaving the Antiochean prince with just the city of Antioch and the port of St. Symeon in his domain.

After the Antioch campaign, the Ayyubid army partially disbanded and Saladin returned to Damascus. There he was joined by al-Adil who set to conquering the remaining two castles in Palestine, at Safed and Belvoir. The Siege of Safed began in early November and the Templar and Hospitaller garrisons surrendered on 6 December 1188. The Siege of Belvoir Castle ended on 9 January 1189, and Saladin released the remainder of his army. He spent the winter planning assaults on Antioch and Tripoli.

In August 1189, Guy of Lusignan launched his Siege of Acre, the first counteroffensive offered by the Franks. Saladin was now faced with defending his conquests.

== Aftermath: the new Crusade begins ==
Following the fall of Jerusalem, news of the defeat was brought to Rome by Joscius, the archbishop of Tyre. Shortly thereafter, on 20 October 1187, pope Urban III died, reportedly from shock on hearing this news. Urban's successor Gregory VIII issued the bull Audita tremendi calling for a new crusade on 19 October. The Third Crusade had begun.

== See also ==
- Bibliography of the Crusades: modern works
- Chronologies of the Crusades
- Historians and histories of the Crusades
- A History of the Crusades: list of contributions

== Bibliography ==
- El-Azhari, Taef (2016). Zengi and the Muslim Response to the Crusades: The Politics of Jihad. Routledge. ISBN 9780367870737.
- Asbridge, Thomas (2010). The Crusades: he Authoritative History of the War for the Holy Land. HarperCollins. ISBN 9780061981364.
- Baldwin, Marshall W., ed. (1969a). The First Hundred Years. Setton, Kenneth M. (ed.), A History of the Crusades, University of Wisconsin Press. ISBN 9780299048341.
- Baldwin, Marshall W. (1969b). "The Latin States under Baldwin III and Amalric I, 1143–1174" ( (PDF)). The First Hundred Years. pp. 528–562. Archived from the original on 2023-01-04.
- Baldwin, Marshall W. (1969c). "The Decline and Fall of Jerusalem, 1174-1189" ( (PDF)). The First Hundred Years. pp. 590–621. Archived from the original on 2023-01-04.
- Bosworth, Clifford E. (2004). The New Islamic dynasties: A Chronological and Genealogical Manual. Edinburgh University Press. ISBN 9780748606849.
- Gibb, Hamilton A. R. (1969a). "The Caliphate and the Arab States" ( (PDF)). The First Hundred Years. pp. 81–98. Archived from the original on 2023-01-04.
- Gibb, Hamilton A. R. (1969b). "Zengi and the Fall of Edessa" ( (PDF)). The First Hundred Years. pp. 449–462. Archived from the original on 2023-01-04.
- Gibb, H. A. R. (1969c). "The Career of Nūr-ad-Din" ( (PDF)). The First Hundred Years. pp. 513–527. Archived from the original on 2023-01-04.
- Gibb, H. A. R. (1969d). "The Rise of Saladin" ( (PDF)). The First Hundred Years. pp. 563–589. Archived from the original on 2023-01-04.
- Gibb, H. A. R. (1969e). "The Aiyūbids" ( (PDF)). The Later Crusades, 1189–1311. pp. 693–714. Archived from the original on 2023-01-04.
- Hamilton, Bernard (2000). The Leper King and His Heirs: Baldwin IV and the Crusader Kingdom of Jerusalem. Cambridge University Press. ISBN 9780521017473.
- Hillenbrand, Carole (1999). The Crusades: Islamic Perspectives. Routledge. ISBN 9780415929141.
- Lane-Poole, Stanley (1898). Saladin and the fall of the Kingdom of Jerusalem. G. P. Putnam and Sons.
- Lewis, Bernard (1969). "The Ismā'īlites and the Assassins" ( (PDF)). The First Hundred Years. pp. 99–134. Archived from the original on 2023-01-04.
- Lewis, Bernard (2003). The Assassins: A Radical Sect in Islam. Phoenix. ISBN 9781842124512.
- Lock, Peter (2006). The Routledge Companion to the Crusades. Routledge. ISBN 9781135131371.
- Lyons, Malcolm Cameron; Jackson, D. E. P. (1982). Saladin: The Politics of the Holy War. Cambridge University Press. ISBN 0521317398.
- Madden, Thomas F. (2013). The Concise History of the Crusades. Critical Issues in World and International History (Third ed.). Rowman & Littlefield. ISBN 9781442215757.
- Mayer, Hans E. (1972). The Crusades [Geschichte der Kreuzzg̈e]. Translated by Gillingham, John. Oxford University Press. ISBN 9780198730972.
- Michaud, Joseph François (1881). History of the Crusades [Histoire des Croisades]. Translated by Robson, William. Three volumes. London: George Routledge and Sons.
- Nicholson, Robert L. (1973). Joscelyn III and the Fall of the Crusader States, 1134-1199. E.J. Brill. ISBN 9789004036765.
- Nicolle, David (1993). Hattin 1187: Saladin's greatest victory. Osprey. ISBN 9781846036019.
- Nicolle, David (2009). The Second Crusade 1148: Disaster outside Damascus. Osprey. ISBN 9781846033544.
- Nicolle, David (2011). Saladin. Bloomsbury Publishing. ISBN 9781780962368.
- Painter, Sidney (1969). "The Third Crusade: Richard the Lionhearted and Philip Augustus" ( (PDF)). The Later Crusades, 1189–1311. pp. 45–86. Archived from the original on 2023-01-04.
- Phillips, Charles (2010). The Complete Illustrated History of the Crusades. Hermes House. ISBN 9780857231352.
- Phillips, Jonathan P. (1996). Defenders of the Holy Land: The Relation between the Latin East and the West, 1119–1187. Clarendon Press. ISBN 9780198205401.
- Phillips, Jonathan (2019). The Life and Legend of the Sultan Saladin. Yale University Press. ISBN 9780300249064.
- Richard, Jean C. (1999). The Crusades, c.1071–c.1291 [Histoire des croisades]. Translated by Birrell, Jean. Cambridge University Press. ISBN 9780521625661.
- Riley-Smith, Jonathan (1991). The Atlas of the Crusades. Facts on File. ISBN 9780816021864.
- Riley-Smith, Jonathan, ed. (2001). The Oxford Illustrated History of The Crusades. Oxford University Press. ISBN 9780192854285.
- Riley-Smith, Jonathan (2014). The Crusades: A History. Bloomsbury Publishing. ISBN 9781472508799.
- Rousset, Paul (1957). Histoire des croisades. Payot. ISBN 9782228120203.
- Runciman, Steven (1952). A History of the Crusades, Volume Two: The Kingdom of Jerusalem and the Frankish East, 1100–1187. Cambridge University Press. ISBN 9780521347716.
- Setton, Kenneth M., ed. (1969–1989). A History of the Crusades. Six Volumes. University of Wisconsin Press.
- Smail, R. C. (1995). Crusading Warfare, 1097–1193. Cambridge University Press. ISBN 9780521458382.
- Tyerman, Christopher (2006). God's War: A New History of the Crusades. Belknap Press. ISBN 9780674023871.
- Tyerman, Christopher (2009). The Crusades. Sterling Publishing Company. ISBN 9781402768910.
- Wolff, Robert L.; Hazard, Harry W., eds. (1969). The Later Crusades, 1189–1311. Setton, Kenneth M. (ed.), A History of the Crusades, University of Wisconsin Press. ISBN 9780299048440.
