= Timeline of the Kingdom of Jerusalem =

Coat of arms of the Kingdom of Jerusalem

The Kingdom of Jerusalem was a Crusader state established in 1099 by western European warriors in lands conquered from Muslim rulers (in modern-day Israel and Jordan) during the First Crusade. As its first ruler Godfrey of Bouillon did not take the title of king, his brother and successor Baldwin I was crowned the first king in 1100. By 1153, Baldwin I and his successors captured all towns on the Palestinian coast mainly with the support of Pisan, Genoese and Venetian fleets and also took control of the caravan routes between Egypt and Syria. The kings regularly administered other Crusader states—Antioch, Edessa and Tripoli—on behalf of their absent or underage rulers.

The polarisation of the Muslim world enabled the crusaders (known in the Levant as Franks) to consolidate their rule in Palestine. They could also appeal to the popes and the European rulers for help against their enemies. In the mid-twelfth century, Baldwin III and his successor Amalric maintained a close alliance with the Byzantine Empire, but they could not prevent the ruler of Aleppo, Nur ad-Din, from uniting the Muslim states in Syria in the 1150s. Internal strife weakened the kingdom during the reigns of the leper Baldwin IV and the unpopular Guy of Lusignan. This facilitated Nur ad-Din's former general, Saladin, to unite Egypt and Syria in the 1180s. Saladin destroyed the crusader army in the Battle of Hattin on 4 July 1187, and occupied almost the whole kingdom during the following months.

The city of Tyre was saved by the Italian crusader, Conrad of Montferrat, and the Third Crusade forced Saladin to acknowledge the restoration of the Franks' rule in most coastal towns in his 1192 truce with Richard I of England. Further lands were recovered during the reigns of Henry of Champagne and Aimery of Lusignan, and Emperor Frederick II also restored the Franks' rule in the city of Jerusalem in 1229. Frederick and his successors were absent monarchs and the kingdom was administered by regents (or bailiffs) from 1229 to 1269. Due to conflicts between the kings' representatives and the powerful barons, and the War of Saint Sabas between Genoa and Venice, the kingdom disintegrated into autonomous towns and lordships by the 1260s. The personal union of Jerusalem and Cyprus could not prevent the Mamluks of Egypt from occupying the last Frankish outposts in 1291. In addition to the Lusignan kings of Cyprus, the Angevin rulers of Naples and their successors maintained a claim to the defunct Jerusalemite kingdom for centuries.

== Background ==
1st–2nd centuries

- In Christianity, places associated with Jesus in Roman Palestine become deemed worth a visit for spiritual benefits. Christians regard Calvary (the venue of Jesus's sufferings) in the city of Jerusalem as an especially sacred place.

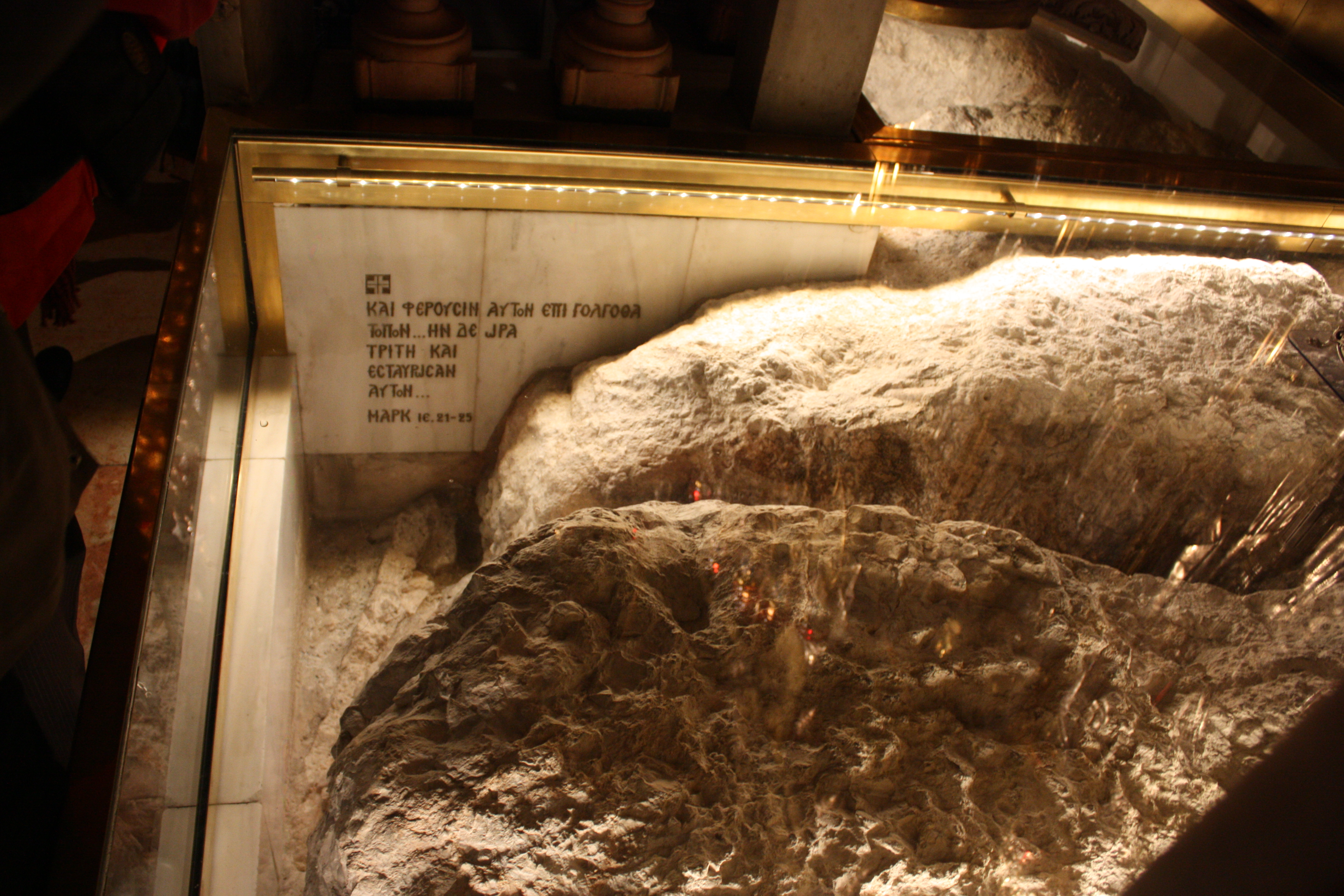
Rock of Calvary in the Church of the Holy Sepulchre in Jerusalem, supposedly the site of the crucifixion of Jesus

325–431

- Large churches are built to receive pilgrims at the most popular Palestinian shrines during the reign of the first Christian Roman Emperor Constantine the Great and his successors. Among them, the Church of the Holy Sepulchre includes Calvary.

632–661

- The Muslim Rashidun Caliphate conquers Syria, Palestine, and Egypt from the Eastern Roman (Byzantine) Empire. Thereafter, few western European pilgrims risk a voyage to the Holy Land.

638

- February/March. After a prolonged siege, the caliph Umar, enters Jerusalem.

c. 850

- The Frankish aristocrat Fromont makes the first known penitential pilgrimage to Jerusalem.

1009

- September 27. The Fatimid caliph al-Hakim orders the destruction of the Holy Sepulchre.

1040s

- The restoration of the Holy Sepulchre is completed.

1055

- December 18. The Turk ruler Tughril I, head of the Seljuk clan, seizes Baghdad, the capital of the Abbasid Caliphate. He takes control of the Caliphate's government with the consent of Caliph Al Qa'im.

c. 1063–1070

- Merchants from the Italian city of Amalfi establish the Saint Mary of the Latins Abbey for Benedictine monks near the Holy Sepulchre.

Before 1070

- The Saint Mary of the Latins Abbey founds the Hospital of Saint John for male pilgrims in Jerusalem and staffs it with men living a monastic life.

1071

- August 21. Battle of Manzikert: the Seljuk sultan Alp Arslan overcomes the Byzantines, eventually opening Asia Minor to further Turkic invasions.

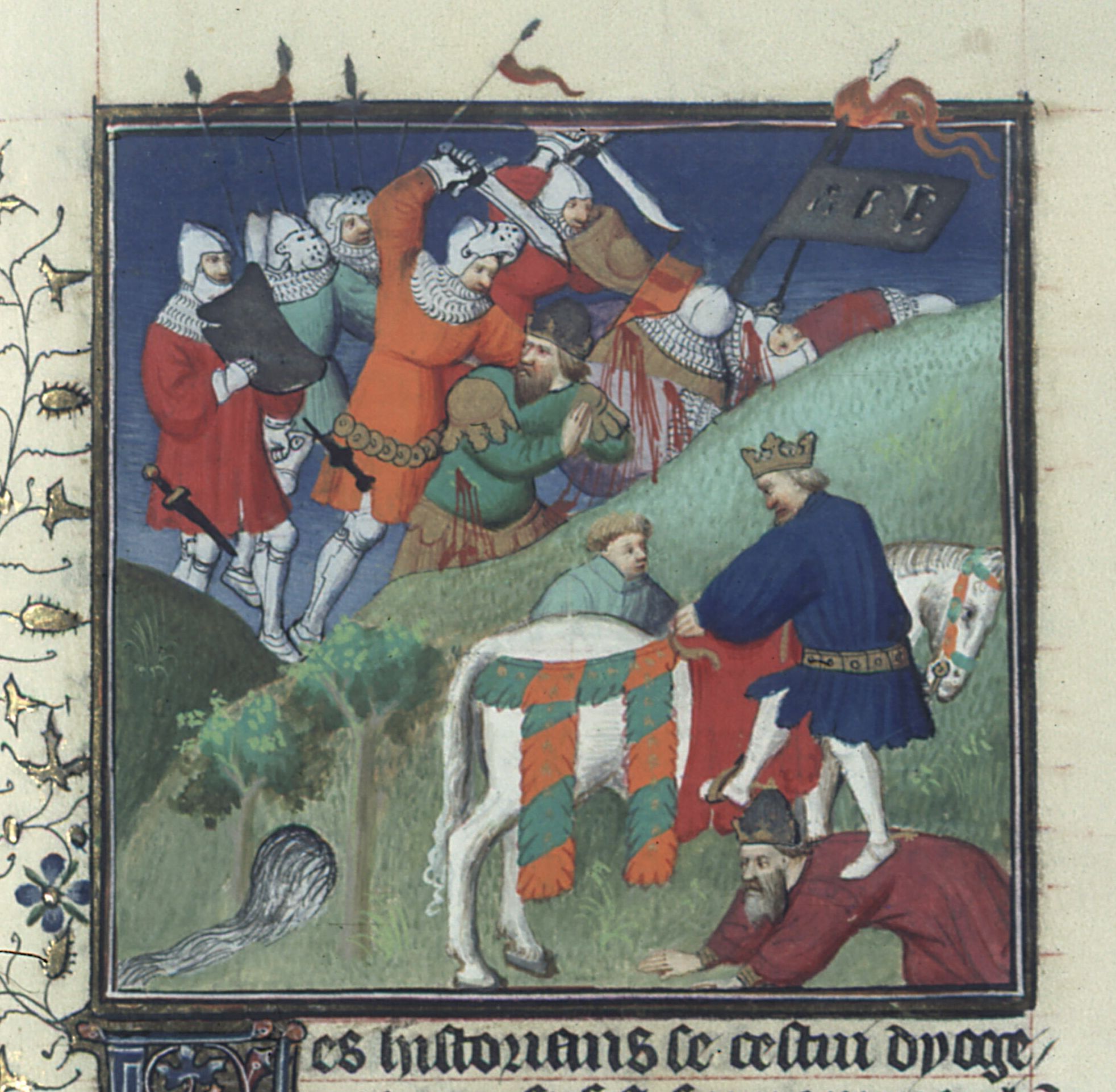
Battle of Manzikert (1071)

- The Turk warlord, Atsiz ibn Uvaq, captures Jerusalem from the Fatimids.

1071–1079

- The Seljuk Turks conquer much of Syria and Palestine.

1074

- March 1. Pope Gregory VII plans to launch a military campaign against the Turks for the liberation of the Holy Land.

Before 1081/82

- Saint Mary Magdalene Abbey is established for nuns in Jerusalem.

1080s

- Theologians who support the Gregorian church reform movement develop the Roman Catholic concept of holy wars, providing the papacy with an ideology for the use of armed forces.

1092

- November. The Seljuk sultan Malik-Shah I dies and his empire disintegrates into competing states.

1095

- March. The Byzantine Emperor Alexios I Komnenos's envoys seek Pope Urban II's support for raising western troops against the Turks at the Council of Piacenza.
- November 27. Pope Urban proclaims the First Crusade for the liberation of Jerusalem at the Council of Clermont, merging the ideology of penitential pilgrimages with the concept of holy wars.
A version of Pope Urban II's sermon at the Council of Clermont (1095)

Frenchmen ...; men chosen by and beloved of God...– it is to you ... that we appeal. ... Disturbing news has emerged from Jerusalem ...: that the race of Persians, ... a people rejected by God ... has overthrown the churches of God or turned them over to the rituals of their own religion. ... By now the Greek empire has been dismembered by them. So to whom should the task fall of ... wresting their conquests from them if not to you – you to whom God has given above other nations outstanding glory in arms...?

— Robert the Monk, Historia Iherosolimitana
- December 1. Raymond IV, Count of Toulouse, is the first high-ranking aristocrat to join the crusade.

1096

- August 15. Godfrey of Bouillon, Duke of Lower Lotharingia, departs for the crusade. His brother, Baldwin of Boulogne, and their kinsman, Baldwin of Bourcq, accompany him.

1097

- c. January 20. Godfrey swears fealty to Alexios I in Constantinople.

1098

- March 9. Baldwin of Boulogne assumes power in the city of Edessa in Upper Mesopotamia, establishing the first Crusader state, the County of Edessa.
- June 3. The crusaders capture the city of Antioch in Syria.
- June 28. Battle of Antioch: under the command of the Italo-Norman prince Bohemond, the crusaders route the Seljuk relief force led by Kerbogha, the atabeg (governor) of Mosul.
- July 3. The crusaders decide to delay their campaign to Jerusalem to avoid summer heat. They conquer lands that would develop into the second Crusader state, the Principality of Antioch under Bohemond's rule.
- August 26. Al-Afdal, the Fatimid vizier, captures Jerusalem.
- October 18. Simeon II, the exiled Orthodox Patriarch of Jerusalem, and the papal legate, Adhemar of Le Puy, propagate the crusade in a common letter.

1099

- January 7. Bohemond takes full possession of Antioch.
- January 13. Raymond and Bohemond's nephew Tancred continue the crusade towards Jerusalem.
- February 14. Raymond attacks the fortress of Arqa.
- Spring. Al-Afdal offers to grant entry into Jerusalem to unarmed pilgrims.
- c. April 1. The protracted siege of Arqa forces Raymond to seek assistance from Godfrey and Robert II of Flanders.
- c. April 10. Byzantine envoys inform the crusaders about Alexios's plan to invade Palestine in late June.
- Early May. Ignoring Raymond's protests, the crusaders depart for Jerusalem before the arrival of the Byzantine army.

== First kingdom ==
=== Establishment (1099–1100) ===
1099

- May 19. The crusaders cross the Dog River into Palestine.
- June 3. The crusaders seize the city of Ramla and establish the first Catholic diocese in Palestine. A grant by the first bishop, Robert to Syrian and Frank colonists fixing their tributes will be the template for similar grants in Palestine.
- June 7. The crusaders (1,200–1,300 knights and 10,700–10,800 foot-soldiers) reach Jerusalem.
- June 17. A Genoese fleet captures the port city of Jaffa.
- Early July. Tancred captures Bethlehem and places his banner over the Church of the Nativity. The clergymen demand that the Holy Land be transformed into a spiritual realm.
- c. July 15. Patriarch Symeon dies in exile.
- July 15. The crusaders capture Jerusalem. They massacre or enslave c. 3,000 Muslims and Jews.
Slaughter of the townspeople in Jerusalem by the Crusaders (1099)

[The Crusaders] put to the sword great numbers of gentiles who were running about through the quarters of the city, fleeing in all directions...: they were piercing through with the sword's point women who had fled into the turreted palaces and dwellings; seizing by the soles of their feet from their mothers' laps or their cradles infants who were still suckling and dashing them against the walls or lintels of the doors and breaking their necks; they were slaughtering some with weapons, or striking them down with stones; they were sparing absolutely no gentile of any age or kind.

— Albert of Aachen, Historia Hierosolymitanae expeditionis
- July 22. Godfrey is elected as the city's first Latin ruler but does not adopt the title of king.
- Late July. Raymond declines to cede the Tower of David to Godfrey, but Godfrey's soldiers seize it without resistance.
- August 1. Senior clerics of the crusaders' camp elect the Normand priest Arnulf of Chocques as the first Latin Patriarch of Jerusalem. He expels the local Christian (Armenian, Copt, Jacobite and Nestorian) clergy from the Holy Sepulchre.
- August 12. Battle of Ascalon: the crusaders route al-Afdal's army.
- c. August 30. Most crusaders leave the Holy Land for Europe.
- Early September. A Pisan fleet arrives on Syria under the command of Daimbert, Archbishop of Pisa.
- October 15–December 15. Godfrey unsuccessfully besieges Arsuf.
- December 21. Daimbert, Bohemond of Antioch and Baldwin of Edessa come to Jerusalem, accompanied by thousands of pilgrims.

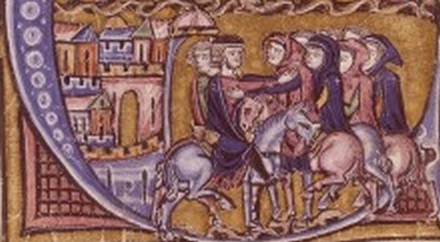
Godfrey of Bouillon receives his brother, Baldwin I of Edessa, at Jerusalem (1100)

- December. Pope Paschal II calls for a new crusade.
- December 25. Arnulf is deposed and Daimbert is elected as the new patriarch at a synod (church assembly). Godfrey and Bohemond swear fealty to Daimbert. The Latin patriarchate seizes a district in Jerusalem.

c. 1100

- A decree stipulates that a man who lives in a house for more than a year seizes its possession against its absent owner.
- Godfrey founds the Benedictine Abbey of Saint Mary of the Valley of Jehosaphat at the site identified as the Tomb of the Virgin Mary.

1100

- February. The emirs of the coastal towns of Ascalon, Caesarea and Acre pay tribute to Godfrey.
- February 2. Godfrey grants one quarter of Jaffa to Daimbert.
- April 1. Godfrey promises Jaffa and Jerusalem to Daimbert, retaining possession until further conquests.
- Early April. The Pisan fleet sails for Italy.
- June/July Godfrey makes a grant to the Hospital of Saint John, indicating that it is in practice treated as an independent organisation.
- c. June 10. A Venetian fleet arrives at Jaffa. The Venetians' treaty with Godfrey's retainer Warner of Grez and Tancred establishes their right to have their own district and church in the towns in the Holy Land.
- July 18. Godfrey dies unexpectedly.
- c. July 22. Godfrey's retainers send envoys to Baldwin of Boulogne, urging him to claim Jerusalem.
- c. August 1. Daimbert asks Bohemond to prevent Baldwin from coming to Jerusalem.
- c. August 15. The Muslim warlord Danishmend Gazi captures Bohemond in Anatolia.
- August 20. Tancred's troops and the Venetians capture the coastal town of Haifa and massacre the townspeople.
- October 2. Baldwin grants Edessa to Baldwin of Bourcq and departs for Jerusalem.
- Late October. Baldwin of Boulogne's supporters prevent Tancred from seizing Jerusalem and Jaffa. Daimbert takes refuge at a monastery on Mount Zion.
- November 9. The burghers of Jerusalem ceremoniously receive Baldwin.
- December 25. Daimbert crowns Baldwin as the first king of Jerusalem in the Church of the Nativity.
- Tancred establishes the Benedictine Abbey of Mount Tabor.

=== Consolidation (1101–1124) ===
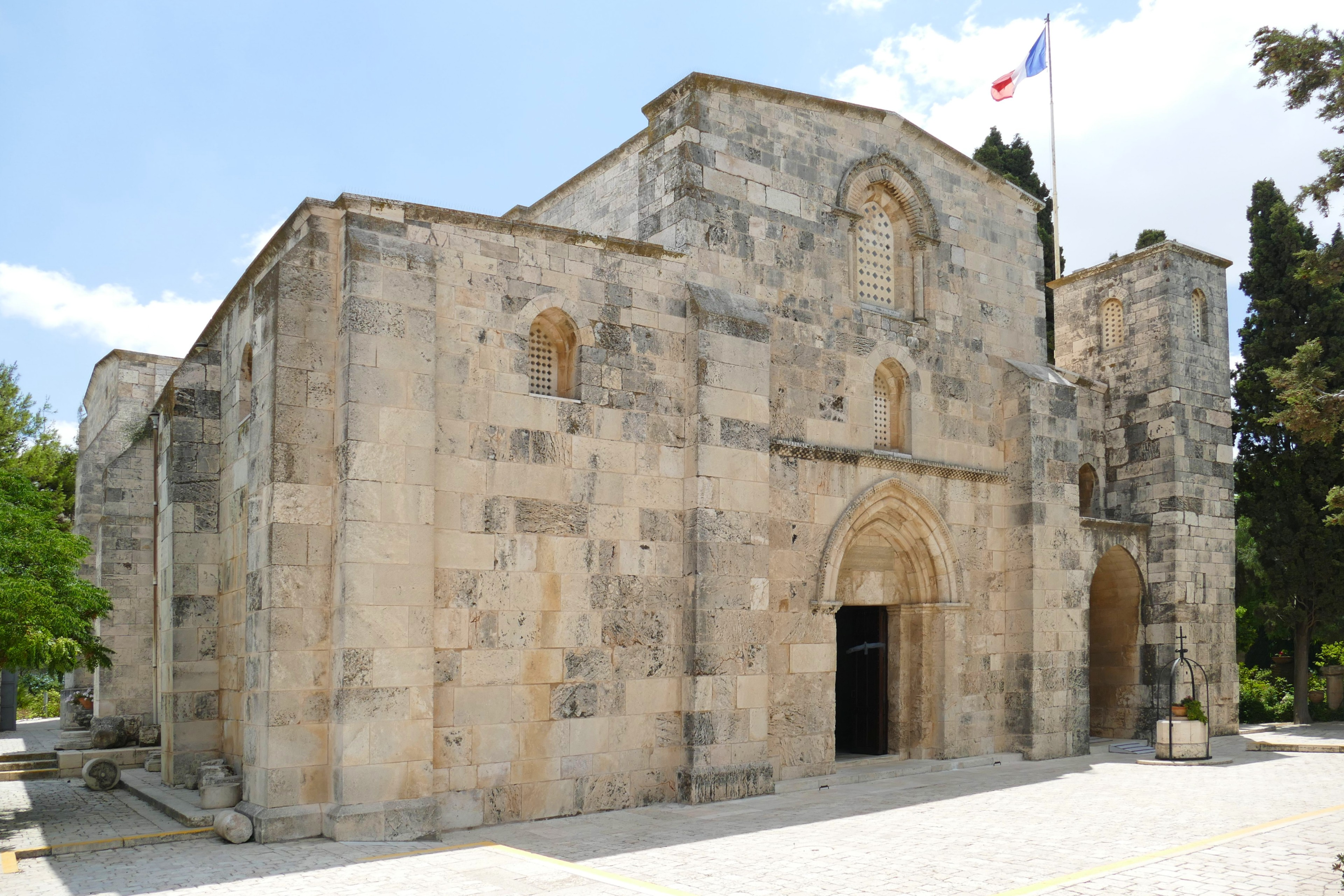
Church of Saint Anne in Jerusalem (1100s)

1101

- Early March. Tancred departs for Antioch to assume the regency for the captive Bohemond. The papal legate Maurice of Porto comes to Jerusalem.
- Easter. A Genoese fleet arrives at Jaffa. Greek Orthodox monks return to the Holy Sepulchre to secure the celebration of the Holy Fire. (Note: The resurrection of Jesus has been celebrated by the lighting of candles by fire descending from above (an event regarded as a miracle by the faithful), but in 1101, the Holy Fire did not appear.)
- May. Baldwin and the Genoese capture Arsuf and Caesarea.
- August–September. The forces of Kilij Arslan massacre most new crusaders at Mersivan and Heraclea Cybistra in Asia Minor.
- September 7. First Battle of Ramla: Baldwin routes a Fatimid army, but about one-third of his troops perish on the battlefield.
- Winter. Maurice of Porto presides over a church council that deposes Daimbert for treachery and other crimes.

1102

- May 17. Second Battle of Ramla: Al-Afdal's son, Sharaf al-Ma'ali, almost annihilates the Jerusalemite army; many survivors of the previous year's crusade (such as Counts Stephen of Blois and Stephen of Burgundy) fall on the battlefield.
- May 28. Baldwin gathers new troops and Sharaf al-Ma'ali returns to Egypt.
- Late May. Tancred tries to achieve Daimbert's restoration, but the new papal legate, Robert of St Eusebio, confirms Daimbert's deposition. A popular cleric, Evremar, is selected as the new patriarch.
- October 12. The English pilgrim Saewulf arrives at Jaffa. He spends the winter in the kingdom and departs from Jaffa again on May 17, 1103.

1103

- April. Baldwin besieges Acre, but cannot capture it.
- May. Raymond starts the prolonged siege of the prosperous coastal port of Tripoli. He assumes the title of count of Tripoli.
- Pope Paschal II places the Abbey of Mount Tabor under the Holy See's direct authority and Galilee under the abbot's ecclesiastic jurisdiction.

1103–1106

- Baldwin forces his Armenian wife Arda into a monastery for unknown reasons.

c. 1104

- The Jacobite metropolitan of Jerusalem Ignatius II convinces Baldwin I to restore the estates of his see to him.

1104

- May 25. Siege of Acre: Baldwin captures the town with the assistance of Genoese and Pisan fleets. The nearby fields are turned over to sugarcane growing and sugar refineries are established.
- Autumn. Daimbert sails for Italy to achieve his restoration at the Holy See.

1105

- February 28. Raymond dies and his kinsman, William Jordan, continues the siege of Tripoli.
- August 27. Third Battle of Ramla: Baldwin defeats the united Fatimid and Damascene armies.

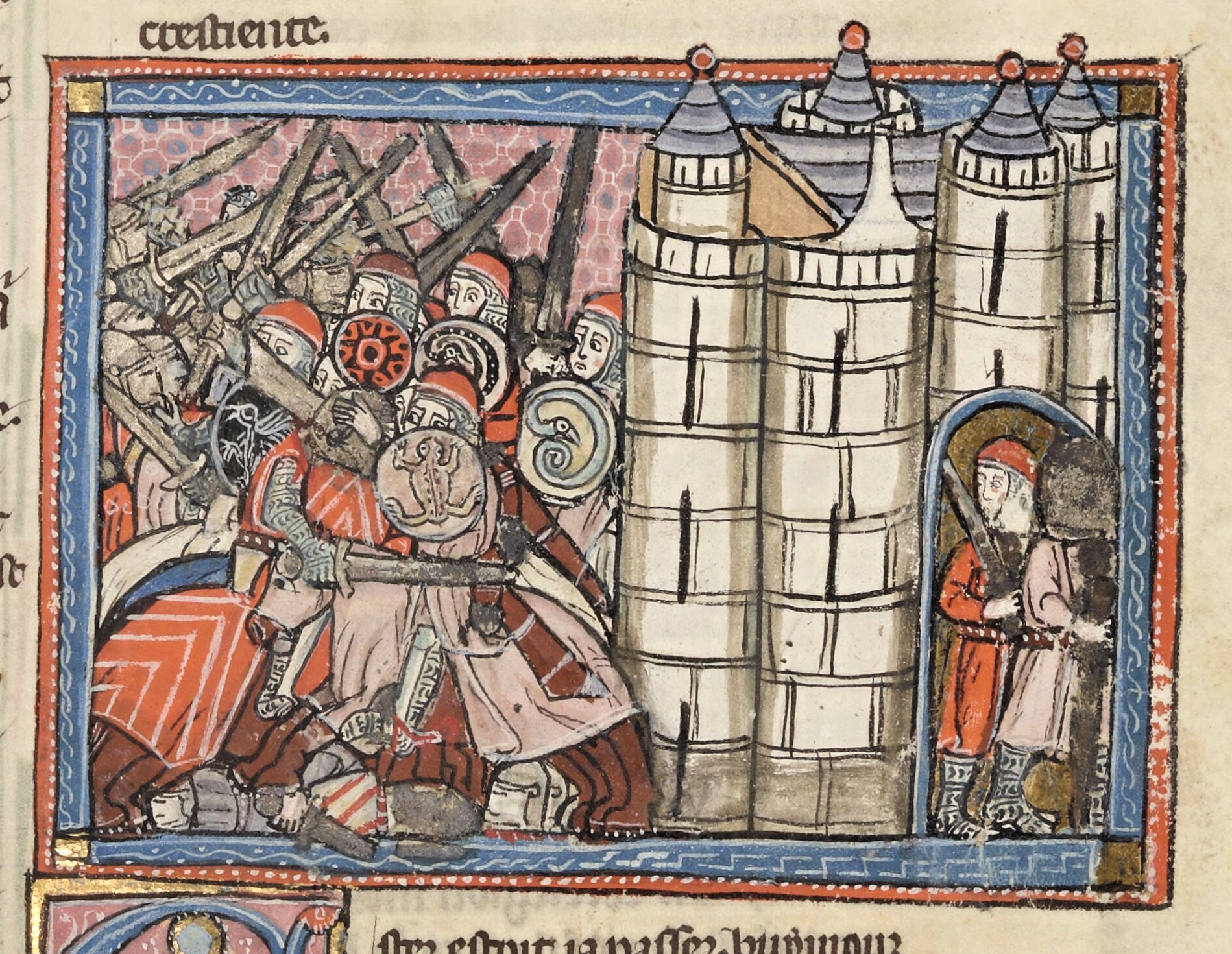
Third Battle of Ramla (1105)

1106

- Daniel of Kiev arrives in the kingdom on a pilgrimage. He will remain in the kingdom until 1108.

c. 1107

- Baldwin starts to grant "money fiefs"—a share of royal revenues—to his knights.

1107

- June. Pope Paschal reinstates Daimbert as patriarch but Daimbert dies.
- Baldwin approaches Pope Paschal, requesting the deposition of Evremar for ineptitude.

1108

- The new papal legate, Archbishop Ghibbelin of Arles, deposes Evremar at a church council. Ghibbelin is elected as the new patriarch.

c. 1109

- Ghibbelin establishes the Roman Catholic Diocese of Bethlehem at Baldwin's request, and founds the Roman Catholic Diocese of Nazareth.

1109

- March. Raymond's son, Bertrand, lays claim to his father's inheritance against William Jordan. William Jordan makes an alliance with Tancred, and Bertrand swears fealty to Baldwin.
- April. Council of Tripoli: a general assembly of the crusader states' leaders under Baldwin's auspices at Tripoli. They confirm Bertrand's claim to Tripoli, and Baldwin grants Galilee to Tancred in fief.
- July 12. The crusaders capture and sack Tripoli, killing many of the townspeople.

1110

- May 12. Baldwin and a Genoese fleet capture Beirut. The crusaders massacre the townspeople.
- Early summer. Baldwin and Bertrand make a joint military campaign against Mawdud, the atabeg of Mosul, to protect Edessa.
- December 4. Siege of Sidon: Baldwin, Sigurd I of Norway and a Venetian fleet capture the city. The Muslim burghers remain in the town.

1111

- February 17 and 24. A qadi (judge) from Aleppo, Ibn al-Khashshab urges Seljuk Sultan Muhammad I Tapar to wage the jihad (holy war) against the crusaders.
- Pope Paschal confirms the Jerusalemite patriarchs' jurisdiction over the newly established Roman Catholic bishoprics of Sidon and Beirut, ignoring the traditional boundary between the patriarchal sees of Antioch and Jerusalem.
- Patriarch Ghibbelin uses his legatine power to take control of the Abbey of Mount Tabor.

1112

- Lent. Patriarch Ghibbelin dies.
- June 19. Pope Paschal puts the Saint Mary of the Latins Abbey under the direct authority of the Holy See.
- December. Arnulf of Chocques is elected as the new patriarch with Baldwin's support.

1113

- February 15. Pope Paschal grants extraordinary privileges to the Hospital of Saint John, establishing the Hospitallers, an international monastic order under the authority of their master.
- June 28. Battle of al-Sannabra: Mawdud and Toghtekin, the atabeg of Damascus, defeat Baldwin in Galilee.
- July–August. Mawdud makes raids as far as Ascalon.
- August. Although Arda is still alive, Baldwin marries the wealthy dowager countess of Sicily Adelaide del Vasto.
- Baldwin II of Edessa's cousin, Joscelin I of Courtenay receives Galilee from Baldwin.

1114

- The Canons Regular of the Holy Sepulchre adopt the Rule of St. Augustine.

1115

- The papal legate, Berengar, Bishop of Orange, deposes Patriarch Arnulf for Baldwin's bigamous marriage.
- Pagan is named as the first chancellor of Jerusalem.
- The construction of Montreal Castle in Oultrejordain begins. Baldwin grants estates to the knights and commoners who settle in the region which develops into a center of sugarcane growing.

1115–1119

- The knight Hugues de Payens and his comrades form a confraternity dedicated to the protection of pilgrims on the road between Jaffa and Jerusalem.

c. 1116

- Castles are built near Petra and Aqaba to control the caravan routes between Egypt and Syria.
- Baldwin grants liberties to local Christians who move from Oultrejourdain to Jerusalem.

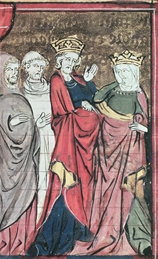
Baldwin I of Jerusalem repudiates his wife Adelaide del Vasto (1117).

- Arnulf of Chocques presides over a church council that annuls the marriage of Baldwin and Adelaide.

1117

- July 19. Pope Paschal restores Arnulf of Chocques to the patriarchal see.

1118

- March. Baldwin invades Egypt.
- April 2. Baldwin dies of an illnes at the Egyptian border town of Arish. Envoys are sent to his brother, Eustace III, Count of Boulogne, offering him the throne.
- April 14. Baldwin II of Edessa comes to Jerusalem where Patriarch Arnulf and Joscelin achieve his election as the new king.
- Late April. Patriarch Arnulf dies. The most important towns and the noblemen swear fealty to Baldwin at a general assembly.
- May–July. Baldwin and troops from Antioch and Tripoli prevent Al-Afdal and Toghtekin from launching a joint campaign against the kingdom.
- Late summer. Baldwin invades Damascene territory and routes Toghtekin's son, Taj al-Muluk Buri.
- August–September. Warmund of Picquigny, a cleric of unknown background, is elected as the Latin patriarch on Baldwin's initiation.

1119

- Patriarch Warmund sanctions the confraternity established by de Payens and his fellows, and Baldwin cedes a part of the royal palace, identified as Solomon's Temple, to them, hence they become known as Knights Templar.
- June 28. Battle of the "Field of Blood": the Artuqid ruler of Mardin Ilghazi almost annihilates the Antiochene army.
- Late July. Baldwin is acknowledged as regent for the absent underage prince of Antioch, Bohemond II.
- August 14. Battle of Hab: Baldwin forces Ilghazi and Toghtekin to withdraw from Antioch.
- August–September. Baldwin grants the County of Edessa to Joscelin.
- December 25. Baldwin and his Armenian wife Morphia of Melitene are crowned king and queen in Bethlehem.

1120

- January 16. Council of Nablus: the Jerusalemite prelates and barons adopt laws against sexual misconduct and confirm the right of the Church to collect the tithe. Baldwin abolishes customs on food delivered to Jerusalem.
Canons 5, 8 and 13 of the Council of Nablus (1120)

The adulterer should be castrated and expelled from the country; the adulteress should suffer rhinotomy-unless her husband forgives her. If he does so, both should be expelled beyond the sea. ... Adults consenting to the sodomitic depravity should be burnt, both the active and the passive party. ... A man who rapes a female Saracen he owns should be castrated; she should be seized on behalf of the fisc.

— Patriarch Warmund and King Baldwin II at the assembly of Jerusalemite prelates and barons
- January 23. Baldwin appeals to Pope Calixtus II and to Venice for assistance against the Muslim powers.
- May. Fulk V, Count of Anjou, comes to the Holy Land for a pilgrimage.
- June. Baldwin returns to Antioch to repel an invasion by Ilghazi, ignoring his Jerusalemite vassals' opposition to the campaign.

1120s

- The canons of the Holy Sepulchre open a cathedral school.

1121

- June. Toghtekin invades Galilee, forcing Baldwin to return from Syria.
- August–October. Baldwin conducts new campaigns in Syria.

1122

- January. Fulk hires 100 knights for the defence of the Holy Land before his departure for Europe.
- Early. Pons, Count of Tripoli denies obedience to Baldwin, but their retainers mediate a reconciliation between them.
- September 13. Joscelin of Edessa is captured at the town of Saruj by the neighboring Muslim ruler Nur al-Daulak Balak.
- Autumn. Baldwin appoints the Edessene aristocrat Geoffrey of Marash to administer the county on Joscelin's behalf.

1123

- April 18. Balak captures Baldwin in Syria.
- Late April. Patriarch Warmund convokes a general assembly which elects the aristocrat Eustace Grenier as bailiff (or lieutenant) for the captive Baldwin.
- May. The Doge of Venice Domenico Michiel arrives at Jaffa and the Venetian fleet defeats the Fatimid navy.
- May 29. Fatimid troops invade the kingdom, but the Jerusalemite army defeats them near the fortress of Ibelin.
- June 15. Eustace Grenier dies, and William I of Bures, Prince of Galilee, is elected as the new bailiff.
- December. Pactum Warmundi: Patriarch Warmund, William of Bures and the chancellor, Pagan, grant privileges to the Venetians.

1123/24

- A group of barons offers the throne to Charles I, Count of Flanders, but he does not accept the offer.

1124

- July 7 or 8. The Venetians and the Franks capture Tyre. The Muslim burghers remain in the town. The Venetians receive more than 15 nearby villages, and the region develops into the most important center of sugarcane growing in the kingdom.
- August 29. Ilghazi's son, Timurtash, releases Baldwin for ransom, secured by the transfer of hostages, among them Baldwin's youngest daughter Ioveta.
- October 6. Baldwin lays siege to Aleppo.

=== Heyday (1125–1144) ===
The Crusader states and their neighbors (1135)

1125

- January 25. Aqsunqur al-Bursuqi, the atabeg of Mosul forces Baldwin to lift the siege of Aleppo and unites Aleppo with Mosul.
- April 3. Baldwin returns to Jerusalem for the first time since 1121.
- May 2. Privilegium Balduini: Baldwin modifies the terms of the Pactum Warmundi to strengthen royal authority.
- June 11. Siege of Azaz: Al-Bursuqi attacks the Antiochene fortress of Azaz, but Baldwin, Pons and Joscelin force him to abandon the siege using the nomadic tactic of feigned retreat. Al-Bursuqi releases Ioveta and other hostages held for Baldwin.

1126

- Late January. Battle of Marj al-Saffar: Baldwin invades Damascene territory and defeats Toghtekin.
- March–July. Baldwin and Pons conduct joint campaigns in Syria.
- October. Bohemond II marries Baldwin's second daughter, Alice, and assumes power in Antioch.

1126–1128

- Nazareth is raised to the see of an archbishopric with jurisdiction in Galilee.

1127

- April. Seljuk Sultan Mahmud II appoints the general Imad ad-Din Zengi to rule Mosul and Aleppo.
- Summer. Baldwin mediates a reconciliation between Bohemond and Joscelin in Syria.
- October. William of Bures is sent to France to offer the hand of Baldwin's eldest daughter, Melisende, to Fulk of Anjou, and to muster fresh troops for a campaign against Damascus.

1127/28

- October 1. Morphia dies. She is buried in the Abbey of Saint Mary of the Valley of Jehosaphat.

1128

- January. Zengi's troops capture Aleppo.
- July 27. Patriarch Warmund dies.
- May. Fulk accepts Melisende's hand and agrees to attack Damascus.
- Summer or Autumn. Baldwin's relative, Stephen of La Ferté, is elected as the new Latin patriarch.

1129

- January. The Templars' Latin Rule is confirmed at the Council of Troyes.
- May. Fulk comes to Jerusalem with fresh troops and marries Melisende.
- September 4. Buri orders a purge against the radical Shi'ite Muslim Assassins in Damascus. Their leader Ismail al-Ajami seeks Baldwin's assistance, offering the town of Banias to him.
- November. The Franks invade Damascene territory and seize Banias but Buri routes them on the plains of Marj al-Saffar.

c. 1130

- Patriarch Stephen outrages Baldwin by demanding Jaffa from him.
- Leprous knights establish the Order of Saint Lazarus.

1130

- February. Bohemond is killed during a raid and the Antiochene lords offer the regency for his daughter by Alice, Constance, to Baldwin. Alice seeks Zengi's assistance against her father, but Baldwin appoints Joscelin to administer Antioch.
- June. Patriarch Stephen dies. His successor, William of Malines, abandons his claims to Jaffa.

1131

- August 21. Baldwin dies in Jerusalem after naming Fulk, Melisende and their son, Baldwin III, as his co-heirs.
- September 14. Fulk and Melisende are crowned king and queen in the Holy Sepulchre. Fulk quickly replaces most of his late father-in-law's officials with his own supporters.

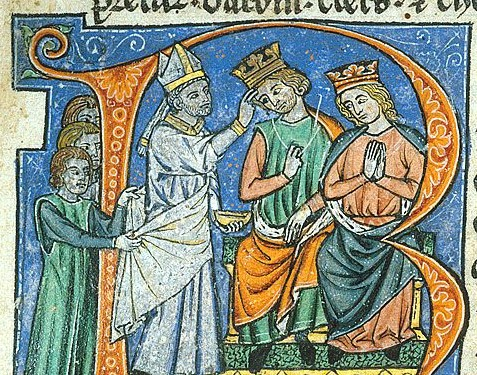
Fulk of Anjou and Melisende of Jerusalem are crowned in the Holy Sepulchre (1130).

1132

- Summer. Alice, Pons and Joscelin II of Edessa conclude an alliance against Fulk, but Fulk defeats Pons near Chastel Rouge and assumes the regency for Constance in Antioch.
- December 21. Buri's son and successor, Shams-ul-Mulk Isma'il, captures Banias.

1133

- Spring. Zengi attacks Pons in the fortress of Montferrand but Fulk relieves it.
- Patriarch Stephen begins the construction of Chastel Hernaut on the road between Jaffa and Jerusalem.

1134

- Late. Walter I Grenier accuses his stepfather, Hugh II of Jaffa, of plotting against Fulk. Hugh rises up and seeks the Fatimids' assistance. Although Patriarch William mediates a reconciliation, Hugh leaves for Italy.
- Fulk orders the construction of a castle at Bayt Jibrin near Ascalon.

c. 1135

- Fulk commissions a splendid psalter for Melisende.

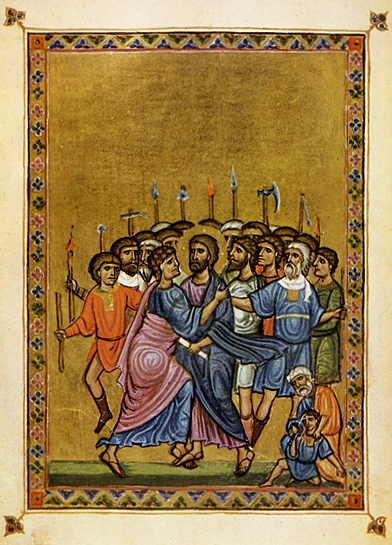
Arrest of Jesus depicted in the Melisende Psalter (1134)

1135

- August. Fulk allows Alice to return to Antioch.

1136

- April. The French aristocrat Raymond of Poitiers marries Constance in Antioch.
- Fulk gives Bethgibelin to the Hospitallers. The grant shows the militarisation of the order and it becomes known as the Knights Hospitaller.

1137

- July 11. Battle of Ba'rin: Zengi defeats Fulk and Raymond II, Count of Tripoli.

1138

- February 5. Melisende establishes the Convent of Saint Lazarus at Bethany and appoints her sister, Ioveta, as its first abbess.
- July. The Archbishop of Tyre, Fulcher of Angoulême, tries to convince Pope Innocent II to restore the authority of his see over bishoprics in Tripoli and Antioch without Patriarch William's authorisation, but to no avail. Patriarch William takes direct control of the see of Tyre and its suffragan dioceses.

1139

- Pope Innocent orders Patriarch William to restore the see of Tyre to Archbishop Fulcher.
- Summer. Fulk and his son-in-law, Thierry, Count of Flanders, capture a cave fortress at Ajloun.
- December. Fearful of Zeng's power, Mu'in ad-Din Unur, atabeg of Damascus, makes an alliance with Fulk and offers Banias to him.

1140

- May. Zengi besieges Damascus, but lifts the siege on hearing that Jerusalemite forces are gathering near Tiberias.
- June 12. Jerusalemite and Damascene troops capture Banias.

1141

- The papal legate, Bishop Alberic of Ostia, consecrates the Dome of the Rock.

1142

- Castle Blanchegarde is built near Ascalon and Kerak is erected in Oultrejourdain. Frank colonists settle near Kerak which develops into an important center of rural industries.

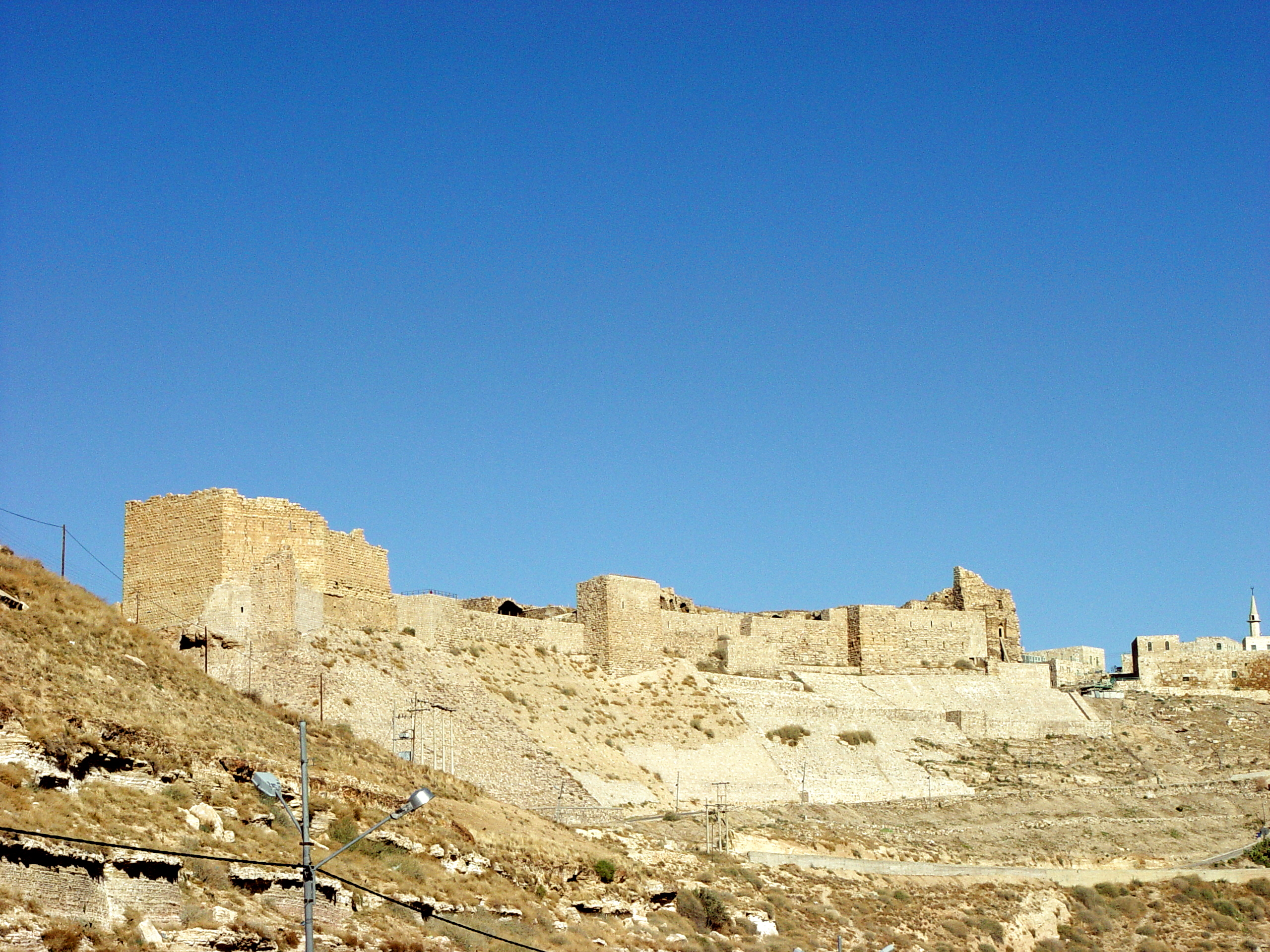
Ruins of the Castle of Kerak, built in Oultrejourdain in 1142

- December 25. Patriarch William crowns and anoints the 12-year-old Baldwin III and crowns Melisende in the Holy Sepulchre.

1143

- November 10. Fulk dies in a hunting accident.
- Melisende appoints her cousin, Manasses of Hierges, as constable.

1144

- Spring. Baldwin crushes a riot in Wadi Musa.
- December 24. Zengi captures Edessa.

=== Towards the union of Muslim Syria and Egypt (1145–1173) ===
1145

- September 25. Patriarch William dies.
- December 1. Pope Eugenius III calls for the Second Crusade.

1146

- January 25. Fulcher of Angoulême is elected as the Latin patriarch.
- September 14. A eunuch slave murders Zengi and Zengi's younger son Nur ad-Din assumes power in Aleppo.

1146–1153

- Frank colonists receive houses, arable lands, vineyards and a share in the olive groves in the royal domain near Casal Imbert. They give two-thirds of the olives and one-third of the crops to the royal treasury which also holds a monopoly over the bakery and the communal bath.

1147

- Spring. Baldwin raids the fertile Hauran region near Damascus.
- May–June. Nur ad-Din forces Baldwin to withdraw from Damascene territory.

1148

- Melisende donates a village to the Jacobite metropolitanate of Jerusalem.
- March 19. Louis VII of France and French crusaders reach Antioch.
- c. April 15. Conrad III of Germany and German crusaders land at Acre.
- June 24. Council of Acre: Louis, Conrad, Melisende, Baldwin and other crusader leaders decide to conquer Damascus.

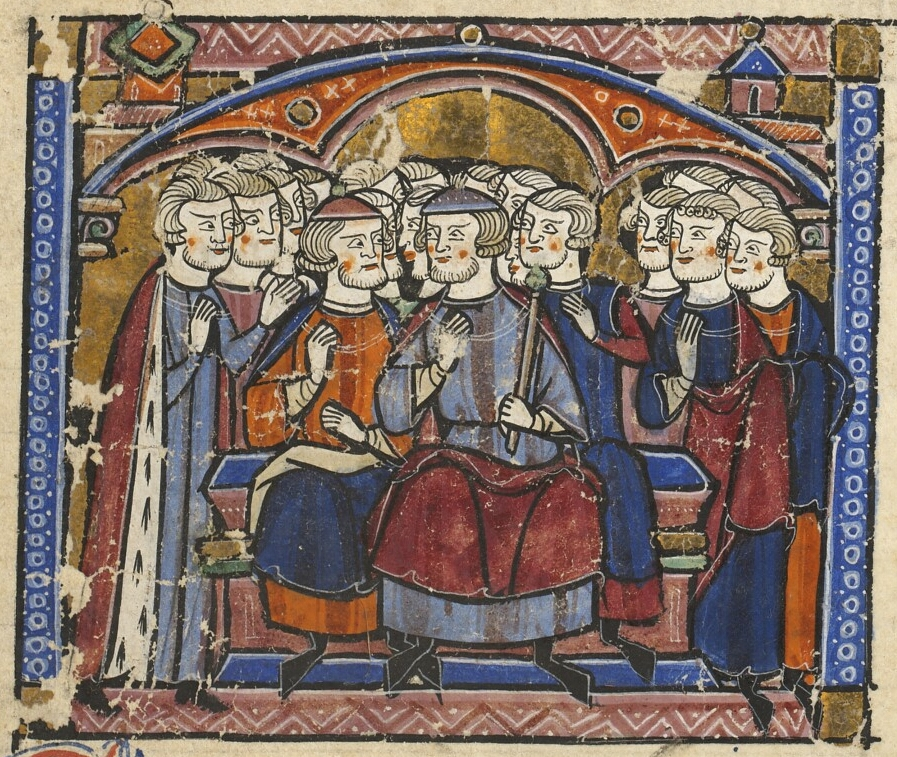
Council of Acre (1148)

- July 23–27. Siege of Damascus: the crusaders attack the city, but they withdraw after relief forces arrive from the Muslim countries.
- September 8. Conrad and his army leave the Holy Land.

1149

- First reference to a Court of Burgesses in Jerusalem. These are law courts headed by the local viscounts judging the Frank commoners.
- May. Louis and the French crusaders depart for France.
- June 29. Battle of Inab: Nur ad-Din's general, Shirkuh, defeats and kills Raymond of Poitiers.
- July 15. Patriarch Fulcher consecrates the Romanesque basilica of the Holy Sepulchre.
- August. Baldwin leads a relief army to Antioch.

before 1150

- Special courts of justice are set up to hear cases relating to fugitive serfs.

1150

- May. Baldwin grants the newly built castle of Gaza to the Templars. The Templars do not appoint a Catholic prelate to the Archdiocese of Gaza and confirm the jurisdiction of the local Orthodox archbishop Meletos over the native Christians.
- May 4. Turkoman raiders capture Joscelin.
- May–June. Baldwin permits Joscelin's wife, Beatrice of Saone, to sell the last Edessene fortresses to the Byzantines.

1150s

- Baldwin orders the collection of all coins and the issue of new ones to secure the royal control of coinage.
- Baldwin, Viscount of Nablus, brings Muslim and Frank colonists to his estates.
- The Hospitallers settle colonists from Palestinian towns, France, Northern Italy and Catalonia in their estates at Bayt Jibrin.

1151

- Melisende makes her younger son, Amalric, the count of Jaffa.
- Spring. Nur ad-Din besieges Damascus, but Baldwin forces him to abandon the siege.
- July. A Fatimid fleet makes a raid along the coast.
- Late. Assassins murder Raymond II. The Tripolitan lords swear allegiance to the underage Raymond III of Tripoli and his mother, Hodierna of Jerusalem, in Baldwin's presence.

1152

- April. Baldwin appoints Humphrey II of Toron as constable and captures Manasses of Hierges' castle at Mirabel. Melisende abdicates under duress and Baldwin deprives Amalric of Jaffa.

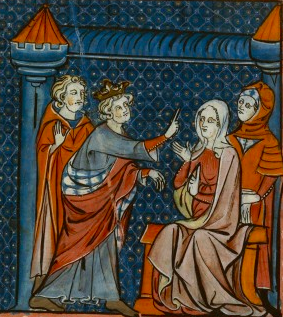
Baldwin III's debate with his mother, Melisende (1152)

1153

- January 25. Baldwin attacks Ascalon.
- Spring. Baldwin gives consent to the marriage of Constance of Antioch and the French crusader Raynald of Châtillon.
- August 23. The Franks capture Ascalon.

1154

- Baldwin restores Jaffa to Amalric and also grants Ascalon to him.
- A royal confirmation of previous grants shows that non-Frank peasants (known as rustici or villani) are regularly donated to the Hospitallers.
- April 25. Nur ad-Din captures Damascus, uniting the Muslim lands in Syria.

c. 1155

- About 500 French, Catalan, Italian and Frank peasants live in the planned village Magna Mahumeria on the estates of the canons of the Holy Sepulchre near Al-Bireh. (Note: Magna Mahumeria has developed around a fortified manor house and consisted of small and narrow—4 m × 10 m (13 ft × 33 ft)—houses with wide rubble and ashlar walls. Documents refer to smiths, carpenters, builders, gardeners and shoemakers living in the village. The villagers collect water on the roofs to feed cisterns through pipes and channels.)

1155

- June. Nur ad-Din and Baldwin conclude a one-year truce.
- October–November. Patriarch Fulcher and his suffragan bishops ineffectually accuse the Hospitallers of abusing their privileges before Pope Hadrian IV.

1156

- June. Nur ad-Din promises a tribute to Baldwin and their truce is renewed for one year.
- Ahmed ibn Qudama leads an exodus of Muslim inhabitants from the area around Nablus, in protest of their unfair treatment by Baldwin of Ibelin. The Muslim families settle in Damascus, and their story is later recorded by a descendant, Diya al-Din al-Maqdisi.

1157

- May–June. Nur ad-Din besieges Banias, but Baldwin relieves the fortress.
- July. Nur ad-Din attacks Banias, but Baldwin, Raymond and Raynald force him to lift the siege.
- September. Thierry, Count of Flanders, and Flemish crusaders land at Beirut.
- November. Troops from the Crusader states and Flemish crusaders capture Shaizar but quickly abandon it because Thierry and Raynald cannot reach a compromise on its status.
- November 20. Patriarch Fulcher dies.
- Late. Baldwin's half-sister Sibylla of Anjou and aunt Ioveta achieve the election of a French cleric, Amalric of Nesle, as the Latin patriarch. The archbishop of Caesarea and the bishop of Bethlehem appeal to the Holy See against his election.

1158

- Spring. Baldwin and Thierry raid Damascene territory.
- May. Nur ad-Din besieges the castle of Habis Jaldak near Tiberias.
- July 15. Baldwin and Thierry relieve Habis Jaldak.
- September. Baldwin marries Theodora Komnene, a niece of the Byzantine Emperor Manuel I Komnenos.
- Late. Pope Hadrian confirms Amalric of Nesle's election as patriarch.

1159

- Spring. Manuel and Baldwin conclude an alliance against Nur ad-Din at a meeting near Antioch.
- May. Manuel accepts Nur ad-Din's offer to an alliance against the Seljuks of Rum and abandons his Syrian campaign.
- Baldwin convince the prelates and barons to remain neutral in the conflict between Pope Alexander III and his rival, Victor IV, at a general assembly in Nazareth, but the prelates later acknowledge Alexander as the lawful pope.

1160

- November. Nur ad-Din's soldiers capture Raynald, and Baldwin appoints the Latin patriarch of Antioch, Aimery of Limoges to administer Antioch.

1161

- September 11. Melisende dies.

1163

- February 10. Baldwin dies childless in Beirut.
- c. February 15. The marriage of Amalric of Jaffa and Agnes of Courtenay is annulled on grounds of consanguinity at the demands of the prelates and barons, but Amalric achieves the confirmation of their children's legitimacy.

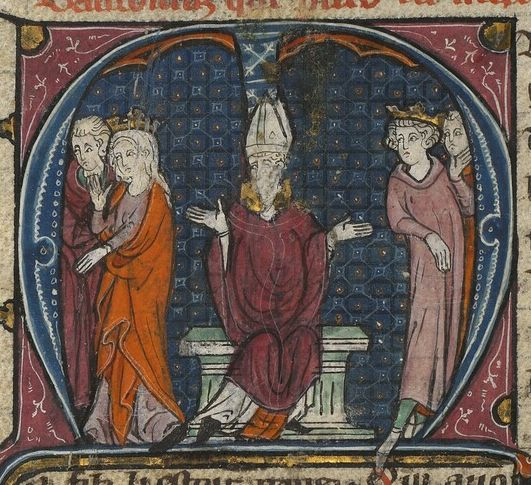
Amalric's marriage to Agnes of Courtenay is annulled (1163)

- February 18. Amalric is crowned king.
- September. Amalric besieges Bilbeis in Egypt, but the Egyptians cut the dikes, forcing him to return to Jerusalem.

c. 1164

- Amalric's Assise sur la ligece obliges the vassals of his own vassals to swear fealty to him.

1164

- April. Nur ad-Din sends Shirkuh to Egypt to restore the former Fatimid vizier, Shawar.
- May. Shawar refuses to pay a tribute to Nur ad-Din and seeks Amalric's assistance against Shirkuh.
- August–October. Amalric besieges Bilbeis.
- August 10. Battle of Harim: Nur ad-Din routes the united armies of Bohemond III of Antioch, Raymond III, Thoros II of Armenian Cilicia and Constantine Kalamanos, the Byzantine governor of Cilicia.
- September. Nur ad-Din captures Banias.
- October. Both Amalric and Shirkuh withdraw their troops from Egypt. Amalric assumes the regency for the captive Raymond in Tripoli.

1167

- January. Shirkuh invades Egypt. Amalric raises funds for an Egyptian campaign by levying a 10 percent tax on movable property with the consent of a general assembly.
- January 30. Amalric invades Egypt.
- March. Shawar agrees to pay a yearly tribute to Amalric.
- March 18. Battle of al-Babein: an indecisive engagement between Amalric and Shirkuh's armies.
- Late March. Shirkuh seizes the Egyptian city of Alexandria, but Amalric attacks it with the assistance of a Pisan fleet.
- c. August 1. Shirkuh abandons Alexandria in return for 40,000 dinars. Amalric is authorized to place a garrison in Alexandria, and Shawar promises to pay a yearly tribute to him.
- August 4. Shirkuh and his army depart for Damascus.
- August 29. Amalric marries Manuel's niece, Maria Komnene, in Tyre.

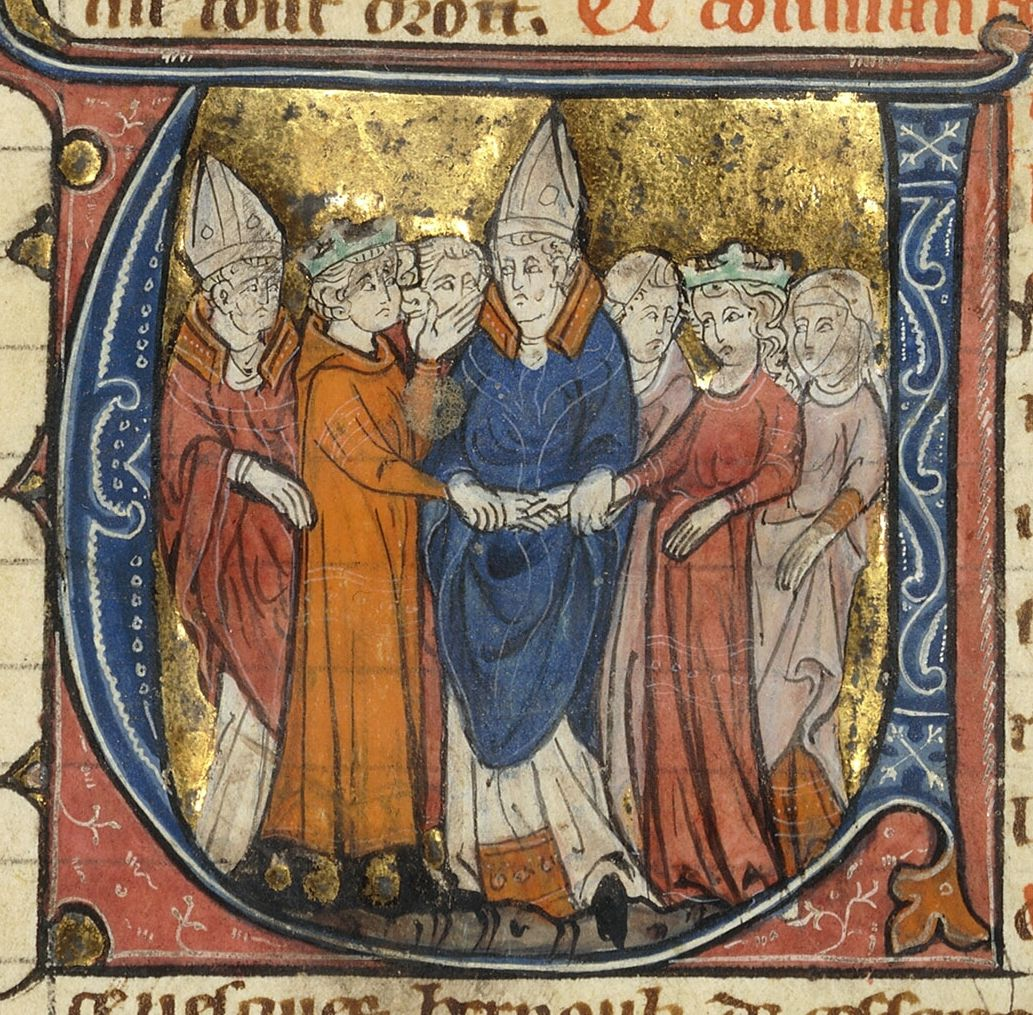
Marriage of Amalric of Jerusalem with Maria Komnene (1167)

1168

- Amalric I secures the right of royal courts to judge Pisans who hold real estate in the kingdom.
- Easter. The Jacobite Patriarch Michael the Syrian meets with Patriarch Amalric in Jerusalem.
- September. Manuel accepts Amalric's proposal for a joint military campaign against the Fatimid Caliphate.
- Early October. The Grand Master of the Knights Hospitallers, Gilbert of Assailly, promises support to Amalric against Egypt, but the Knights Templars decide not to participate in the campaign.
- November 4. Amalric's troops massacre the Muslim and Coptic townspeople at Bilbeis.
- November 13. Amalric lays siege to Cairo. The Fatimid Caliph Al-Adid seeks Nur ad-Din's assistance, but Shawar offers a tribute to Amalric.
- December 25. Shirkuh invades Egypt.

1169

- January 2. Amalric withdraws his troops from Egypt.
- January 18. Shirkuh's nephew, Saladin, kills Shawar with Al-Adid's approval. Al-Adid appoints Shirkuh as vizier.
- March 23. Shirkuh dies.
- March 26. Al-Adid appoints Saladin as vizier.
- Summer. Amalric sends an embassy to France, England and Sicily to ask for a new crusade.
- October–December. The Franks and a newly arrived Byzantine fleet unsuccessfully besiege Damietta.

c. 1170

- Amalric's only son and heir, Baldwin, is diagnosed with leprosy.
Amalric's heir, Baldwin, is diagnosed with leprosy (c. 1170)

[Once] when [Baldwin] was playing with some other noble boys..., they began pinching one another with their fingernails... The others evinced their pain with yells, but ... Baldwin bore the pain altogether too patiently... At first I thought that this happened because of his endurance... At last I discovered that about half of his right hand and arm were numb ... I reported all this to his father. Physicians were consulted and prescribed repeated fomentations, anointings, and even poisonous drugs to improve his condition, but in vain. For ... this was the beginning of an incurable disease.

— William of Tyre, History of Deeds Done Beyond the Sea

1170

- December. Saladin destroys the Frank colonists' unfortified quarters at Darum and Gaza.

1171

- Early. Amalric sends a new embassy to the European rulers.
- March–July. Amalric convinces Manuel to renew their alliance in Constantinople.
- September 13. Al-Adid's death puts an end to the Fatimid Caliphate and makes Saladin the undisputed ruler of Egypt.
- October. Saladin destroys the Frank colonists' quarter at Montreal but returns to Egypt on learning of Nur ad-Din's decision to participate in the campaign. Nur ad-Din accuses Saladin of disloyalty.

1173

- The Assassin leader, Rashid ad-Din Sinan, offers to convert to Christianity if the Templars do not tax the Assassins' subjects in Syria, but the Templars murder his envoys.

1174

- May 15. Nur ad-Din dies in Damascus.
- June. Amalric besieges Banias, but falls seriously ill.
- July 11. Amalric dies in Tiberias.

=== Decline and fall (1174–1187) ===
1174

- July 15. The 13-year-old Baldwin IV is crowned king in the Holy Sepulchre and the seneschal, Miles of Plancy, assumes power in the kingdom.

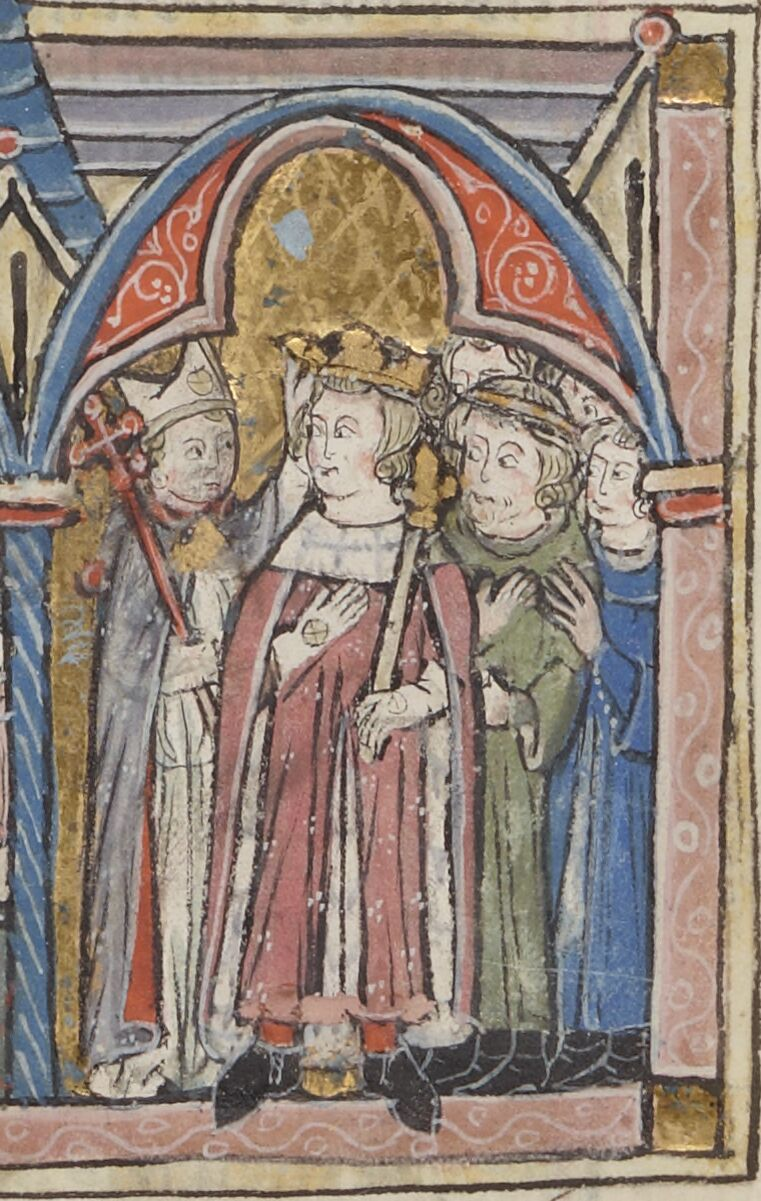
Patriarch Amalric crowns Baldwin IV king (1174).

- July 28. A Sicilian fleet besieges Alexandria, but conflicts between Miles and Humphrey of Toron prevent the mobilisation of the Jerusalemite army.
- August 1. The Sicilians lift the siege of Alexandria.
- August. Raymond of Tripoli claims the regency for Baldwin as his closest male relative.
- Early October. Miles is assassinated in Acre. His widow, Stephanie of Milly, accuses Raymond of plotting against him.
- Late October. The High Court of Jerusalem elects Raymond as bailiff. He marries the Princess of Galilee, Eschiva of Bures.
- October–December. Nur ad-Din's son, As-Salih Ismail al-Malik, goes to Aleppo, and Saladin seizes Damascus and the lower town of Hama.

1175

- January–February. Raymond leads a relief army to Hama against Saladin but abandons the campaign after Saladin releases the hostages held for his ransom.
- July 22. Saladin and Raymond conclude a truce.

1176

- Summer. The ruler of Aleppo, Gümüshtekin, releases Raynald of Châtillon and Baldwin's maternal uncle, Joscelin III of Courtenay.
- July. Baldwin comes of age.
- July–August. Baldwin and Raymond make raids as far as Damascus.
- Late August. Baldwin appoints Joscelin as seneschal and arranges his marriage with a wealthy heiress, Agnes of Milly.
- November. William Longsword—the eldest son of William V, Marquess of Montferrat—marries Baldwin's sister, Sibylla, receiving the County of Jaffa and Ascalon.
- Winter. Raynald is sent to Constantinople to negotiate with Manuel.

1177

- Spring. Raynald marries the lady of Oultrejourdain, Stephanie of Milly, and receives Hebron from Baldwin.
- June. William Longsword dies.
- Summer. Baldwin's health gets worse.
- August 1. Baldwin's cousin, Philip I, Count of Flanders, arrives at Acre, but refuses to assume the regency for him.
- August. A Byzantine fleet arrives at Acre, but the Franks refuse to participate in a joint campaign against Egypt.
- Autumn. Raynald is appointed as "procurator of the kingdom and the army".
- September. Philip, Raymond and Bohemond launch a military campaign in Syria, taking the bulk of the Jerusalemite army with them.
- Late November. Saladin unexpectedly attacks Ascalon.
- November 25. Battle of Montgisard: Baldwin routes Saladin.

1178

- January. Sybilla gives birth to William Longsword's posthumous son, Baldwin.
- October. Baldwin orders the building of the fortress La Chastellet at Jacob's Ford.

1179

- April. Baldwin gives La Chastellet to the Templars. Humphrey dies of fatal wounds received during a raid, and Agnes of Courtney's favorite, Aimery of Lusignan, is made constable.
- May. Saladin raids the region of Jacob's Ford.
- June 10. Battle of Marj Ayyun: Saladin routes Baldwin.
- August 29. Saladin destroys La Chastellet.
- September. Saladin makes raids as far as Beirut and Tyre.

c. 1180

- According to a letter of grant, the burghers of Palmeria are entitled to freely dispose of their property, but they cannot sell it to clerics or the military orders.

1180

- April 20. Bohemond and Raymond march to Jerusalem unexpectedly. Regarding their action as an attempt to dethrone him in Sybilla's favour, Baldwin hastily marries her to Aimery's brother, Guy of Lusignan.

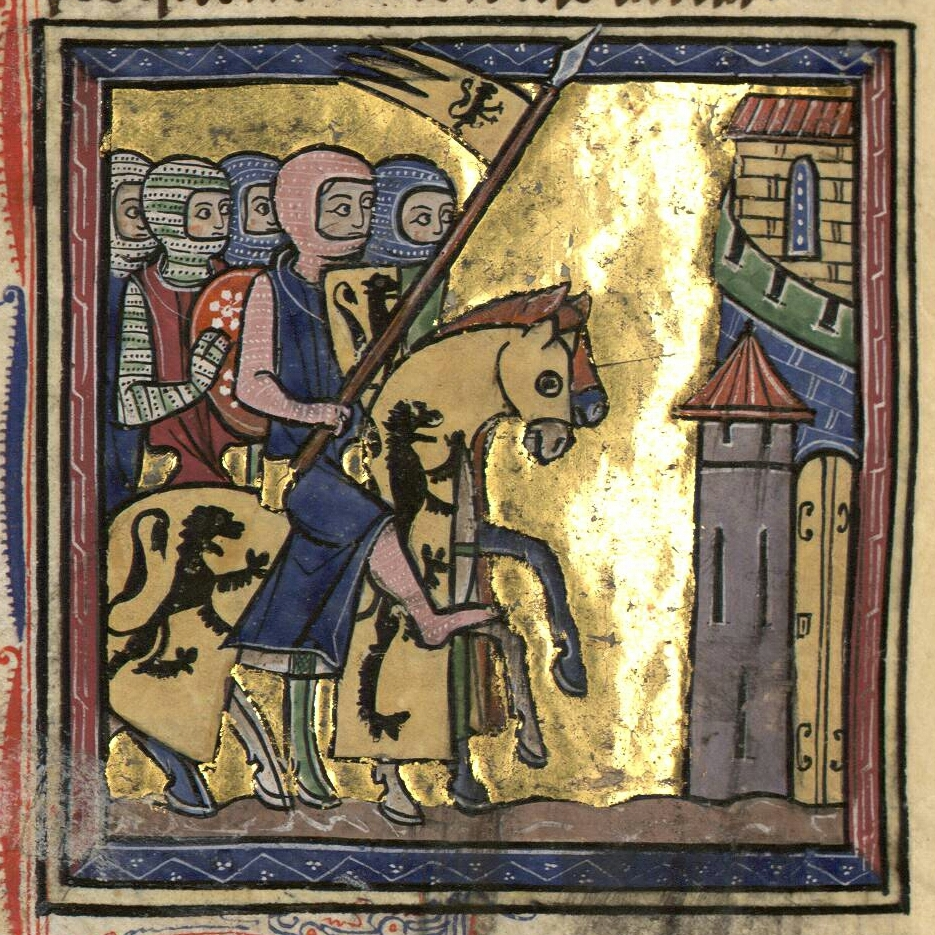
Bohemond III of Antioch and Raymond III of Tripoli ride to Jerusalem unexpectedly (1180).

- May. Saladin accepts Baldwin's proposal for a two-year truce.
- October 6. Patriarch Amalric dies.
- October 16. Heraclius, Archbishop of Caesarea, is elected as patriarch.

1181

- January 16. Pope Alexander III calls for a new crusade, emphasizing that the leper Baldwin is unable to defend the Holy Land.
- Summer. Ignoring the truce, Raynald attacks a caravan.

1182

- Spring. Baldwin prohibits Raymond from entering the kingdom.
- Summer. Baldwin keeps the royal army continuously in the field because of a series of raids from Syria and Egypt.
- August. Saladin besieges Beirut, but Baldwin relieves it.
- September. Baldwin recaptures the fort of Habis Jaldak.

1183

- February. A general council levies an extraordinary tax to cover the increasing defence costs. Raynald's fleet launches a raid on the Red Sea, menacing Mecca and Medina.
- September 29. Saladin invades Galilee.
- October. Baldwin appoints Guy as bailiff. Guy assembles the Jerusalemite army at the Springs of Saffuriya and Saladin returns to Syria. Guy's opponents accuse him of losing the opportunity to inflict a decisive defeat on Saladin.
- November. Baldwin requests Guy to exchange Tyre for Jerusalem with him but Guy refuses. Raynald's stepson, Humphrey IV of Toron marries Baldwin's half-sister, Isabella in Kerak. Saladin besieges Kerak during the wedding.
- November 20. Baldwin orders Patriarch Heraclius to make preparations for the annulment of Guy and Sybilla's marriage. Sybilla's 5-year-old son by William, Baldwin V, is crowned king.
- December 3 or 4. Baldwin IV and Raymond relieve Kerak.
- December. Guy and Sybilla withdraw to Ascalon, and Baldwin IV deprives him of Jaffa.

1184

- March 29. Patriarch Heraclius excommunicates the chancellor William of Tyre, forcing him to abdicate.
- June. Envoys are sent to Europe to ask for a new crusade.
- Augustus 23–September 5. Saladin attacks Kerak, but Baldwin IV relieves it.
- October. Guy pillages a Bedouin tribe in a royal domain.
- Late. Ibn Jubayr, a renowned poet from Al-Andalus, travels through the kingdom. He notes that the local Muslim peasants prefer the Franks' rule because they pay less taxes than their peers in the Muslim countries.

1185

- Early April. The dying Baldwin IV appoints Raymond as bailiff for the child Baldwin V for ten years, and Joscelin as the child king's guardian. The High Court rules that the Pope, the Holy Roman Emperor and the kings of France and England are to choose between Sybilla's and Isabella's claims to the throne in case of Baldwin V's premature death.
- c. April 15. Baldwin IV dies.
- Spring. Saladin and Raymond sign a truce which enables Saladin to invade Mosul.
- A Byzantine monk, John Phokas, visits Orthodox monasteries which have been rebuilt in the Holy Land during the previous decades.

1186

- March 4. Izz ad-Din Mas'ud, the emir of Mosul, acknowledges Saladin's sovereignty.
- July 20–c. September 15. Baldwin V dies. Raymond summons his partisans to a general assembly at Nablus, and in his absence Joscelin takes possession of Jerusalem, Acre and Beirut. Raynald and the grand master of the Templars, Gerard de Ridefort, accompany Sybilla to the Holy Sepulchre where she is crowned queen by Patriarch Heraclius and she crowns Guy king.
- October. Raymond and his supporters offer the crown to Isabella and Humphrey in Nablus, but Humphrey swears fealty to Sybilla and Guy, prompting his supporters (except for Raymond and the aristocrat Baldwin of Ibelin) to also pay homage to the royal couple. Raymond seeks Saladin's alliance against Guy.

1187

- Early. Contrary to the truce, Raynald seizes a caravan and Guy cannot persuade him to return the spoils and the prisoners.
- Late April. Raymond allows Saladin's commander Muzzafar al-Din to march across Galilee.
- May 1. Battle of Cresson: Muzzafar al-Din annihilates an army of Hospitallers and Templars.
- May 2. Raymond's Galilean vassals persuade him to abandon his alliance with Saladin and to make peace with Guy.
- June 26. Saladin and his 30,000 troops invade the Kingdom of Jerusalem. The Jerusalemite troops gather at Saffuriya and their mobilisation entails the reduction of garrisons to the minimum in most fortresses and towns.
- July 4. Battle of Hattin: Saladin destroys the Jerusalemite field army. The Frank commanders fall into captivity. Raynald, the Hospitallers and the Templars are executed.
Saladin has Raynald of Châtillon executed (1187)

[Saladin] said to [Raynald] 'Here I am having asked for victory through Muhammad, and God has given me victory over you.' He offered him Islam but he refused. The sultan then drew his scimitar and struck him, severing his arm at his shoulder. Those present finished him off and God speedily sent his soul to Hell-fire.

— Bahā' al-Din Ibn Shaddād, The Rare and Excellent History of Saladin
- July 5. Tiberias surrenders to Saladin.
- July 9. Saladin captures Acre.
- July 14. William Longsword's brother, Conrad of Montferrat, arrives at Tyre and begins to organise the resistance. He grants privileges to the Pisans in return for their assistance.
- July 10–September 4. Saladin captures Jaffa, Arsuf, Caesarea, Haifa, Sidon and Ascalon.
- October 2. After receiving a free passage to the townspeople for a huge ransom, the defenders of Jerusalem surrender to Saladin.

== Third Crusade (1187–1192) ==
1187

- October. Conrad sends Joscius, Archbishop of Tyre, to Europe to ask for a new crusade.
- October 29. Pope Gregory VIII declares the Third Crusade.
Pope Gregory VIII's grant of crusading privileges to those who depart for the Third Crusade (1187)

We promise full remission of their sins and eternal life to those who take up the labor of this journey with a contrite heart and a humble spirit and depart in penitence of their sins and with true faith. ... Their gods..., with their families, remain under the protection of the holy Roman Church... They should not face any legal challenge regarding the things they possess legally when they received the cross until their return or their death is known for certain... Also, they may not be forced to pay interest if they have a loan.

— Pope Gregory VIII, Audita tremendi
- November 25. Saladin lays siege to Tyre.

1188

- January 1. Saladin abandons the siege of Tyre.
- May. Saladin releases Guy.
- October. A Sicilian fleet arrives at the Holy Land.
- November. Saladin's troops capture Kerak.
- December 6. Safad is captured by Saladin's troops.

1189

- January 5. Belvoir surrenders to Saladin's troops.
- May. Saladin's troops capture Montreal. Only Tyre and Belfort remain under Frank rule in the kingdom.
- August. Guy and his Geoffrey of Lusignan gather 9,000 troops and march to Tyre, but Conrad prohibits Guy to enter the town.
- August 26. Guy lays siege to Acre with the support of a Pisan fleet.
- September. Flemish, Danish, Frisian and French crusaders arrive at Acre.
- October 4. Saladin defeats the crusaders at Acre, but soon leaves the city fearing an epidemic.

1190

The Crusader states and their neighbors (1190)

- Easter. Conrad acknowledges Guy as the lawful king in return for the confirmation of his rule of Tyre.
- June 10. Frederick I, Holy Roman Emperor, drowns in the Saleph River during his crusade.
- Summer. Patriarch Heraclius dies at Acre.
- July 27. Henry II, Count of Champagne and his troops land at Acre.
- July 29. Sybilla and her two daughters by Guy die at Acre.
- Early October. The remnants of Frederick's crusade arrive at Acre.
- c. November 20. Guy's opponents persuade the papal legate, Ubaldo of Pisa, to annul the marriage of Isabella and Humphrey.

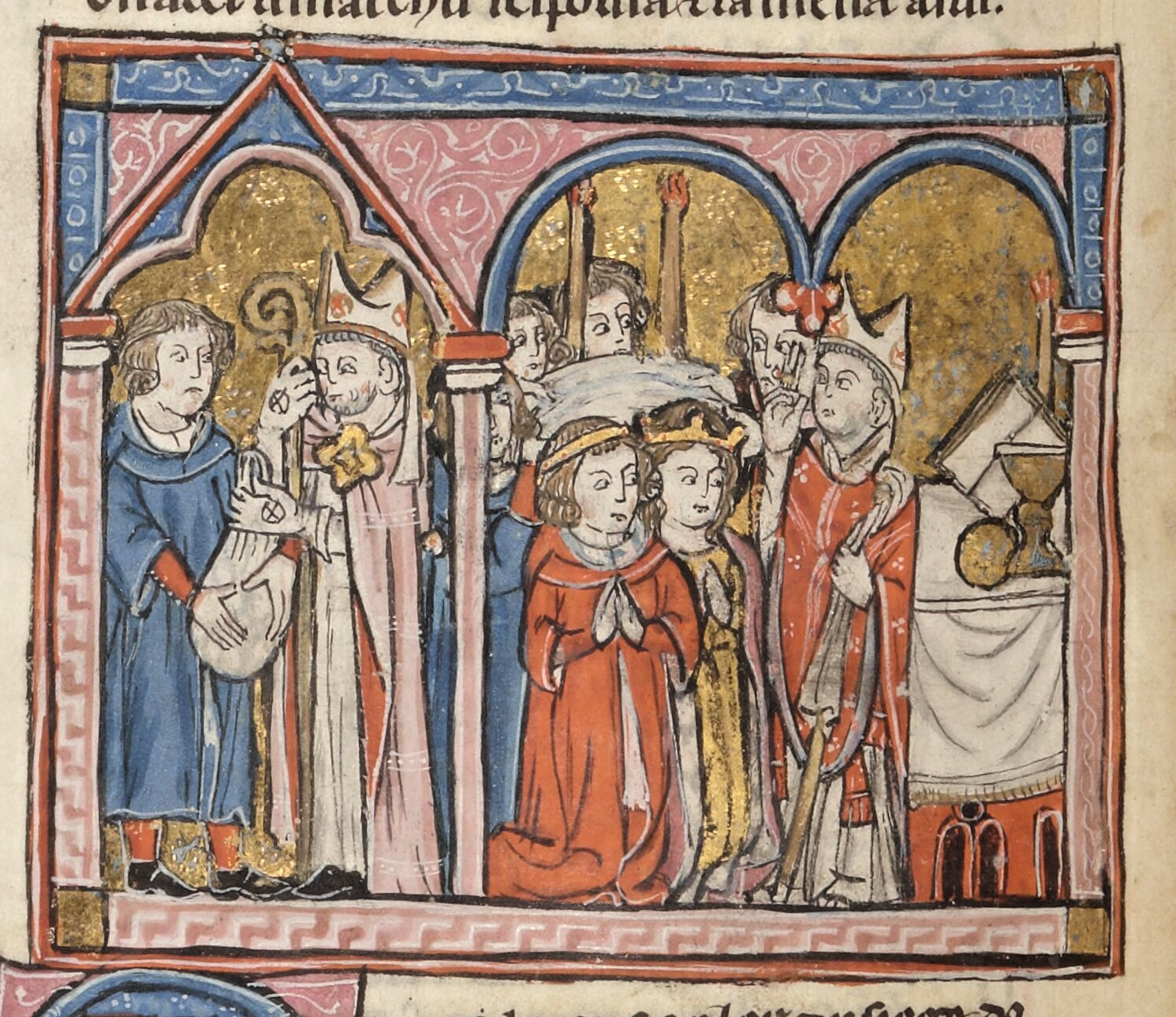
Marriage of Isabella I of Jerusalem and Conrad of Montferrat (1190)

- November 24. Conrad marries Isabella in Tyre.

1191

- April 20. Philip II, King of France, and French crusaders land at Acre. He acknowledges Conrad's claim to the throne.
- May 6–June 1. Richard I, King of England, conquers Cyprus.
- May 11. Guy meets with Richard in Cyprus.
- June 8. Richard disembarks at Acre.
- July 12. The garrison of Acre surrender to the crusaders who grant them a safe passage.
- July 24/26. Richard and Philip confirm Guy's right to rule the kingdom until his death, stipulating that Conrad is to succeed Guy on the throne.
- July 31. Philip departs for France.
- August 20. Richard orders the massacre of 2,700 Muslim prisoners.
- September 7. Battle of Arsuf: Richard overcomes Saladin.
- September 10. Richard seizes Jaffa without resistance.
- October. Richard offers the hand of his sister, Joan, to Saladin's brother Al-Adil, proposing that they could jointly rule the restored kingdom. She refuses to marry a Muslim.
- c. November 15. Conrad proposes a separate peace to Saladin who informs the crusaders about Conrad's offer.

1192

- January 20. The crusaders seize Ascalon.
- April 16. The Frank barons persuade Richard to acknowledge Conrad as the lawful king.
- April 28. Assassins murder Conrad in Tyre.
- May. Richard authorizes Guy to purchase Cyprus from the Templars.
- May 5. Henry of Champagne marries Conrad's pregnant widow, Isabella in Acre.
- September 2. A truce between Saladin and Richard confirms the Franks' rule on the coast from Tyre to Jaffa.
- October 9. Richard departs for England.
- c. October 15. Saladin grants parts of Caymont to Balian of Ibelin and half of Sidon to Reginald of Sidon. Henry restores Haifa, Caesarea and Arsuf to their previous lords and grants Jaffa to Aimery of Lusignan.

== Second kingdom ==
=== Recovery (1193–1229) ===
1193

- March 4. Saladin dies in Damascus, and his empire quickly disintegrates.
- May. Henry limits the Pisans' presence in Acre for their alliance with Guy. As they pillage the coast in revenge, Henry expels them from the kingdom. He imprisons Guy's brother Aimery, but soon release him at the request of the barons and the grand masters.

c. 1194

- Henry imprisons the canons of the Holy Sepulchre for electing Aymar the Monk as the Latin patriarch without having consulted him, but Archbishop Joscius mediates a reconciliation.

1194

- May. Aimery inherits Cyprus from Guy. Henry and the Pisans reach an agreement with his mediation.

1196

- Summer. German crusaders arrive at Acre.
- July. Al-Adil seizes Damascus from Saladin's son, Al-Afdal.

1197

- Early September. Al-Adil captures Jaffa. The German crusaders ignore Henry's ban and raid Muslim territories.
- September 10. Henry falls from the window of the royal palace and dies in Acre.
- c. September 15. Some barons offer the throne to Raoul of Saint Omer, but the military orders achieve the election of Aimery as king.
- October. Aimery marries Isabella. Patriarch Aymar crowns them king and queen but Aimery keeps the administration of Jerusalem and Cyprus separate.
- Late October. German and Frank troops seize Sidon and Beirut.

1198

- Early. Aimery accuses Raoul and Hugh II of Saint Omer of an unsuccessful attempt on his life and banishes them from the kingdom. They appeal to their peers, but Aimery does not repeal his decision.
- June 1. The German crusader sign a new truce with Al-Adil.
- August 15. Pope Innocent III proclaims the Fourth Crusade.

1200

- February. Al-Adil takes control of Egypt.

1202

- Spring. 300 French crusaders land at Acre but they cannot convince Henry to break the truce, and leave for Antioch.
- Patriarch Aymar dies.

1203

- May. The leaders of the Fourth Crusade decide to attack Constantinople.

1204

- May. Aimery's fleet raids the Nile Delta.
- April 12. The crusaders capture Constantinople and establish the Latin Empire of Constantinople on the ruins of the Byzantine Empire, creating a rival for funds and fresh troops from western Europe for the Crusader states.
- September. Aimery and Al-Adil conclude a six-year truce. The Franks take full control of Sidon, Lydda and Ramla.

1205

- May 1. Aimery dies in Acre.
- Late. Isabella dies and her 13-year-old daughter by Conrad, Maria of Montferrat, succeeds her. Isabella's half-brother, John of Ibelin, assumes the regency for her.

c. 1206

- The barons propose Maria to the married Peter II of Aragon, but the Pope does not annul Peter's marriage.

1206

- Pope Innocent appoints Albert of Vercelli as patriarch.

c. 1207

- Patriarch Albert completes a regulation for the hermits living on Mount Carmel.

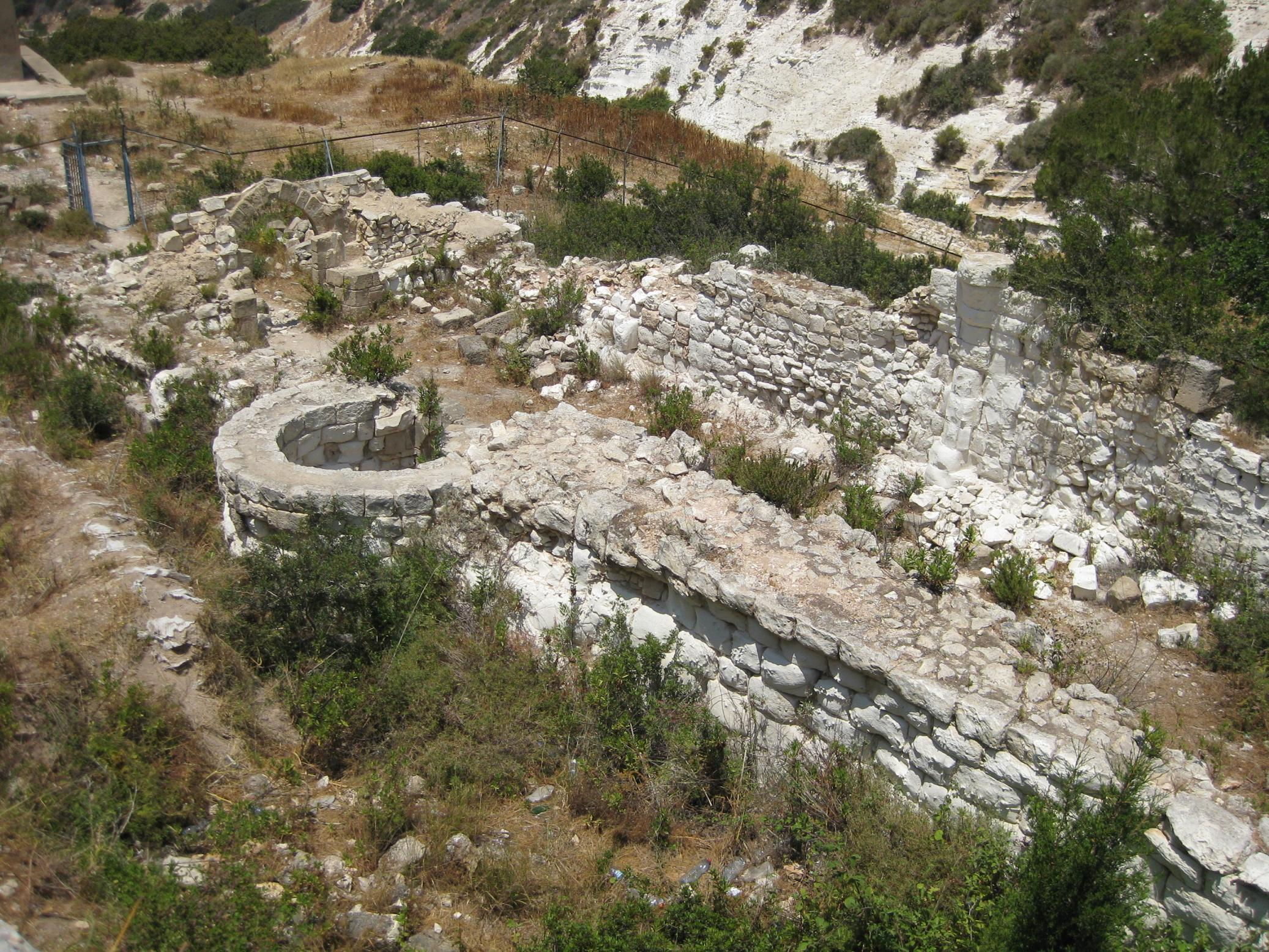
Ruins of the Carmelites' first church on Mount Carmel (c. 1207)

1208

- At the request of a Jerusalemite delegation, Philip II of France names the French aristocrat John of Brienne as his candidate to marry Maria.

1209

- Pope Innocent approves John's candidacy and gives him 40,000 marks for the defence of the Holy Land.

1210

- July. Al-Adil proposes 10 villages in return for the renewal of the truce, but the Templars and the prelates prevent the High Court from accepting the offer.
- September 14. John marries Maria in Acre.
- October 3. John and Maria are crowned in Tyre. Al-Adil's son, Al-Mu'azzam Isa, makes a raid against Acre.
- October. John raids Muslim territory.

1211

- Spring. John sends Walter of Montbéliard to launch a naval raid against the Nile Delta.

1212

- July. John and Al-Adil conclude a six-year truce.
- Late. Maria dies after giving birth to a daughter, Isabella. Pope Innocent menaces those who challenge John's right to rule the kingdom with ecclesiastical sanctions.

1213

- Late April. Pope Innocent proclaims the Fifth Crusade.

1214

- John marries Stephania, the elder daughter of Leo I, the king of Cilician Armenia].
- A cleric murders Patriarch Albert. Pope Innocent appoints John's candidate, the chancellor Raoul of Mérencourt as the Latin patriarch.

1215

- Francis of Assisi's disciple, Giles, settles in the kingdom.

1217

- October. Andrew II of Hungary and Leopold VI of Austria arrive at Acre. Hugh I of Cyprus and Bohemond IV of Antioch join them for a crusade.
- November. The crusaders capture the town of Beisan.
- November 29 – December 7. The crusaders unsuccessfully attack the Muslim fortress on Mount Tabor.

1218

- Early. Andrew, Hugh and Bohemond abandon the crusade.
- Spring. Caesarea is fortified, and Château Pèlerin is built near Acre.
- May 29. The crusaders, along with troops from Jerusalem and Cyprus, lay siege to Damietta under John's command.

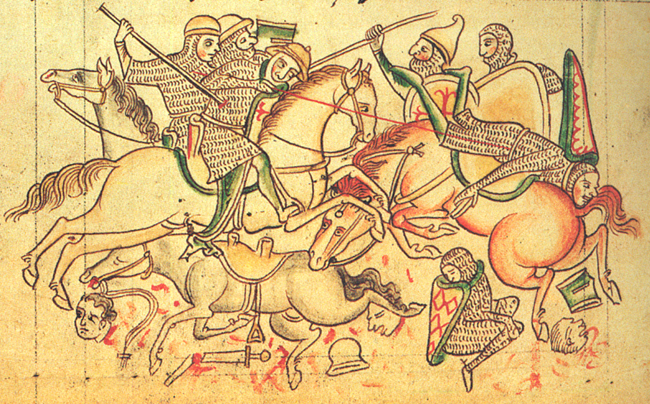
Siege of Damietta during the Fifth Crusade (1218–1221)

- August 31. Al-Adil dies. Al-Kamil inherits Egypt, Al-Mu'azzam seizes Syria.
- September. Pope Honorius III's legate, Pelagius, arrives at Damietta.

1219

- May 2. Leo dies. John lays claim to Cilician Armenia on behalf of his wife and their infant son against her younger sister Isabella.
- October. Al-Kamil offers all Palestine to the west of the Jordan in return for abandoning the crusade. John is willing to accept the offer, but the papal legate Pelagius rejects it.
- November 5. The crusaders capture Damietta. John is appointed to rule the town.
- Late November. Al-Mu'azzam sacks Caesarea.

1220

- Easter. John returns to Acre.
- Summer (?). John's wife and their son die.

1221

- June. Louis I, Duke of Bavaria, and German crusaders arrive at Damietta.
- July 6. John returns to Damietta.
- July–August. The crusaders march towards Cairo, but Al-Kamil's troops trap them.
- August 28. Pelagius and Al-Kadil agree about the evacuation of the crusaders from Egypt. Al-Kadil offers an eight-year truce.
- September 8. The crusaders leave Damietta.

1222

- Summer. Acre is partially destroyed during an armed conflict between the Pisans and Genoese.
- October. John, Patriarch Raoul and the grand master of the Hospitallers, Guérin de Montaigu, leave for Europe to ask for a new crusade and to find a husband for Isabella. John appoints Odo of Montbéliard as bailiff.

1223

- March. Pope Honorius, the Holy Roman Emperor Frederick II, John and the grand masters of the military orders agree to the marriage of Frederick and Isabella. Frederick acknowledges John's right to administer the kingdom.

1224

- May. John marries Berengaria of León at Santiago de Compostela.
- Patriarch Raoul dies.

1225

- Early. Gerold of Lausanne is appointed as patriarch.
- July 25. Frederick promises Pope Honorius to launch a crusade before September 1227.
- August. Isabella is crowned in Tyre before she leaves for Italy.
- November 9. Frederick marries Isabella in Brindisi. The Jerusalemite barons present at the wedding pay homage to Frederick. Frederick sends Richer, Bishop of Melfi, to the kingdom to receive the homage of other barons.

1227

- August. Frederick appoints Thomas, Count of Acerra as bailiff.
- September 8. Frederick sails for the Holy Land, but illness forces him to return to Italy.
- September 29. Pope Gregory IX excommunicates Frederick for breaking his crusader oath.
- October. German, French and English crusaders land at Acre and assist the Franks in fortifying the towns. The Teutonic Knights rebuild the castle of Montfort.

1228

- Spring. Frederick's marshal, Richard Filangieri, arrives at Acre and forbids all raids against Muslim territories.
- April 25. Conrad, the only son of Frederick by Isabella, is born.
- May 5. Isabella dies in Andria and her infant son succeeds her as king of Jerusalem.
- June 28. Frederick sails for the crusade, but Pope Gregory confirms his excommunication.
- Late July. Frederick receives the Jerusalemite barons' homage in Limassol. He demands Beirut from John of Ibelin who refers the case to the High Court.
- September 7. Frederick lands at Acre and starts negotiations with Al-Kamil.

1229

- February 18. Frederick and Al-Kamil sign the Treaty of Jaffa, to last for ten and a half years, restoring the city of Jerusalem to the Franks. The treaty forbids the fortification of Jerusalem and leaves the Dome of the Rock and the Al-Aqsa Mosque in the Muslims' possession.

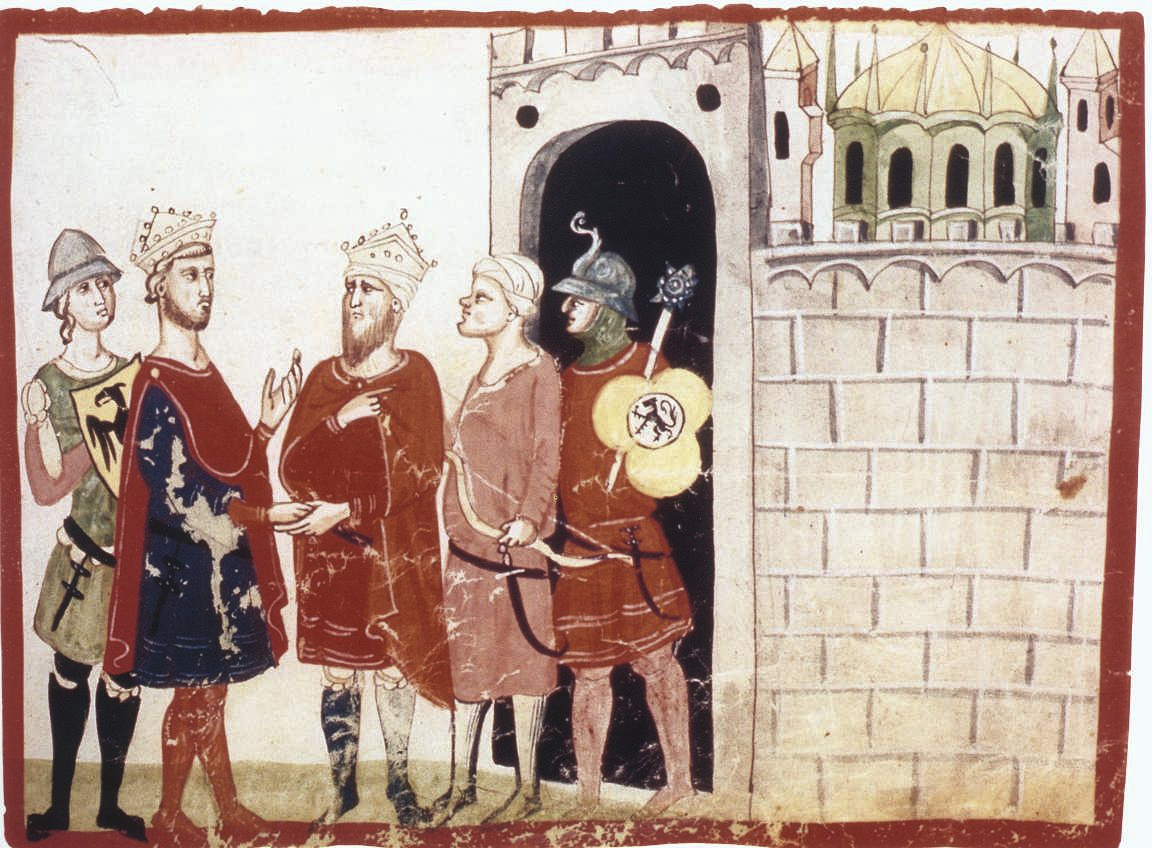
Meeting of Emperor Frederick II and Sultan Al-Kamil (1229)

- March 18. Frederick crowns himself in the Holy Sepulchre.
- March 19. On behalf of the absent Patriarch Gerald, Peter of Limoges, Archbishop of Caesarea, places Jerusalem under an interdict because of the presence of Frederick and the Muslims.

=== Absent kings (1229–1268) ===
1229

- May 1. Frederick departs for Italy after appointing Balian Grenier and Garnier l'Aleman as his bailiffs.
- Summer. Bedouins attack pilgrims on the road from Jaffa to Jerusalem and sack Jerusalem. Alice of Champagne (the younger sister of Queen Maria) lays claim to Jerusalem, arguing that Conrad forfeited the throne by having failed to come to Jerusalem. The High Court does not decide the case.

1230

- May. Jerusalemite delegates unsuccessfully try to convince Frederick to send Conrad to the kingdom.
- September 1. Pope Gregory lifts Frederick's excommunication and recognizes him as Jerusalem's lawful ruler.
- Autumn. Patriarch Gerold lifts the interdict and the Catholic clerics take possession of the churches in Jerusalem.
- Late. Frederick's new bailiff Richard Filangieri orders the confiscation of the fiefs of John of Ibelin and his allies.

1231

- Early. The High Court acknowledges Filangieri as bailiff, but rules that no fiefs can be confiscated without a proper judgement.
- Autumn. Filangieri attacks Beirut.

1232

- Spring. The townspeople form a commune in Acre against Filangieri. John of Ibelin seizes Frederick's fleet and relieves Beirut.
- May 2. Battle of Casal Imbert: Filangieri routes John of Ibelin near Tyre. Filangieri invades Cyprus, but Ibelin sends reinforcements from Acre, Beirut and Tyre to the island.
- Late May. John of Ibelin concludes an alliance with the Genoese.
- June 15. Battle of Agridi: John of Ibelin defeats Filangieri in Cyprus.
- July. Frederick persuades Pope Gregory to summon Patriarch Gerold to Rome and order the Latin Patriarch of Antioch, Albert of Rizzato, to represent Frederick's interests in the Levant.
- c. December 31. Frederick appoints Philip of Maugastel as his bailiff, but John of Caesarea prevents Maugastel from assuming power. The High Court rules that Frederick's appointments by letter are invalid and Conrad has to come to the kingdom to appoint a new bailiff. The High Court declares Balian Grenier and Odo of Montbéliard as lawful bailiffs, but Filangieri keeps Tyre.

1233

- April. John of Ibelin forces Filangieri to leave for Italy.
- July 26. Patriarch Gerold sails for Rome.

1234

- Autumn. Pope Gregory proclaims a new crusade. His legate, Theodoric, Archbishop of Ravenna, places Acre under interdict.

1235

- Early. Pope Gregory cancels the ecclesiastical sanctions against Frederick's opponents, fearing of their conversion to Oriental Christianity.
- October. Jerusalemite troops support the Hospitallers against Al-Muzaffar Umar, the emir of Hama.

1236

- Early. John of Ibelin dies after a riding accident.
- Spring/Summer. The relationship between Pope Gregory and Frederick becomes tense after Frederick's campaigns in Italy.

1237

- Pope Gregory sends Patriarch Gerold back to the kingdom, also appointing him as papal legate.

1238

- March 9. Al-Adil dies. His son, Al-Adil II, succeeds him in Egypt, but cannot seize Damascus.
- Winter. Patriarch Gerold dies.

1239

- March 20. Pope Gregory excommunicates Frederick.
- September 1. Theobald I, King of Navarre, and the first crusaders from France land at Acre. A Muslim army sacks the undefended Jerusalem.
- November 13. Battle of Gaza: the Egyptians defeat the crusaders, killing or capturing more than 1,500 foot soldiers.
- December. An-Nasir Daud, emir of Kerak, destroys the Tower of David.

1240

- May 14. Pope Gregory appoints Robert of Nantes as patriarch.
- Summer. Al-Adil's retainers depose him in favor of his brother, As-Salih Ayyub. Both Ayyub and his opponent, As-Salih Ismail, Emir of Damascus, offer lands to the Franks.
- September. Theobald and other French crusaders abandon the crusade.
- October 8. Frederick's brother-in-law, Richard of Cornwall, and English crusaders land at Acre.
- November. Richard enters into negotiations with Ayyub, ignoring the Templars' opposition.

1241

- February. Ayyub restores Galilee and the hinterland of Jaffa to the kingdom which reaches its greatest territorial extent after 1187.

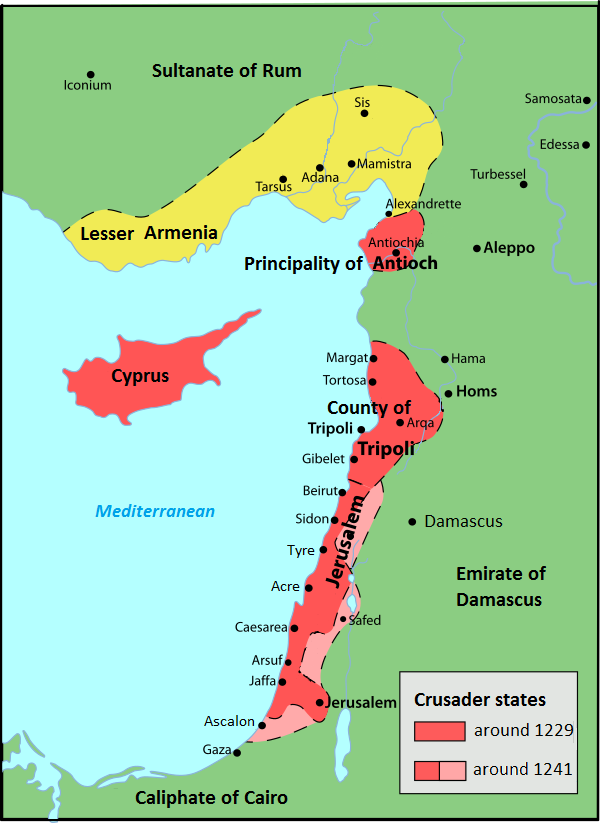
The Crusader states and their neighbors (c. 1241)

- May 3. Richard abandons his crusade.
- June 7. Four barons—Balian of Beirut, Philip of Montfort, John of Arsuf and Geoffrey of Estreing—urge Frederick to appoint his brother-in-law, Simon de Montfort, as bailiff.
- Autumn. Filangieri tries to seize Acre with the Hospitallers' assistance, but Philip of Montfort forces him to return to Tyre. Balian of Beirut and the Templars besiege the Hospitallers' fortress in Acre.

1242

- Spring. Conrad comes of age. The Venetian bailiff, Marsilio Zorzi, demands one third of Tyre from Filangieri, and some burghers of Tyre seek Philip of Montfort's assistance against Filangieri. (Note: Many historians write that these events happened in 1243, because Conrad reached the age of majority at fifteen, according to the laws of Jerusalem. However, evidence conclusively proves that these events actually took place in 1242 (the year when he reached the age of majority, according to Sicilian laws).)
- c. June 1. Filangieri appoints his brother, Lother, as the commander of Tyre and leaves for Europe.
- June 5. The High Court elects Alice (Conrad's nearest relative who lives in the kingdom) and her third husband, Ralph of Nesle, as bailiffs.
- July 10. Frederick's opponents capture Tyre with Venetian and Genoese support, thus only Ascalon and Jerusalem remain under the control of Frederick's supporters.
- October 30. The Templars sack Hebron and destroy the mosque.

1244

- April. Frederick's new baillif, Thomas of Acerra cedes Ascalon to the Hospitallers.
- August 23. Khwarazmian Turks capture Jerusalem and massacre its Christian. Jerusalem is lost to the Franks forever.
- October 17. Battle of La Forbie: Ayyub and the Khwarazmians overcome Ismail and his allies, including Franks from Jerusalem and Antioch. More than 90 per cent of the knights of the military orders perish in the battlefield.

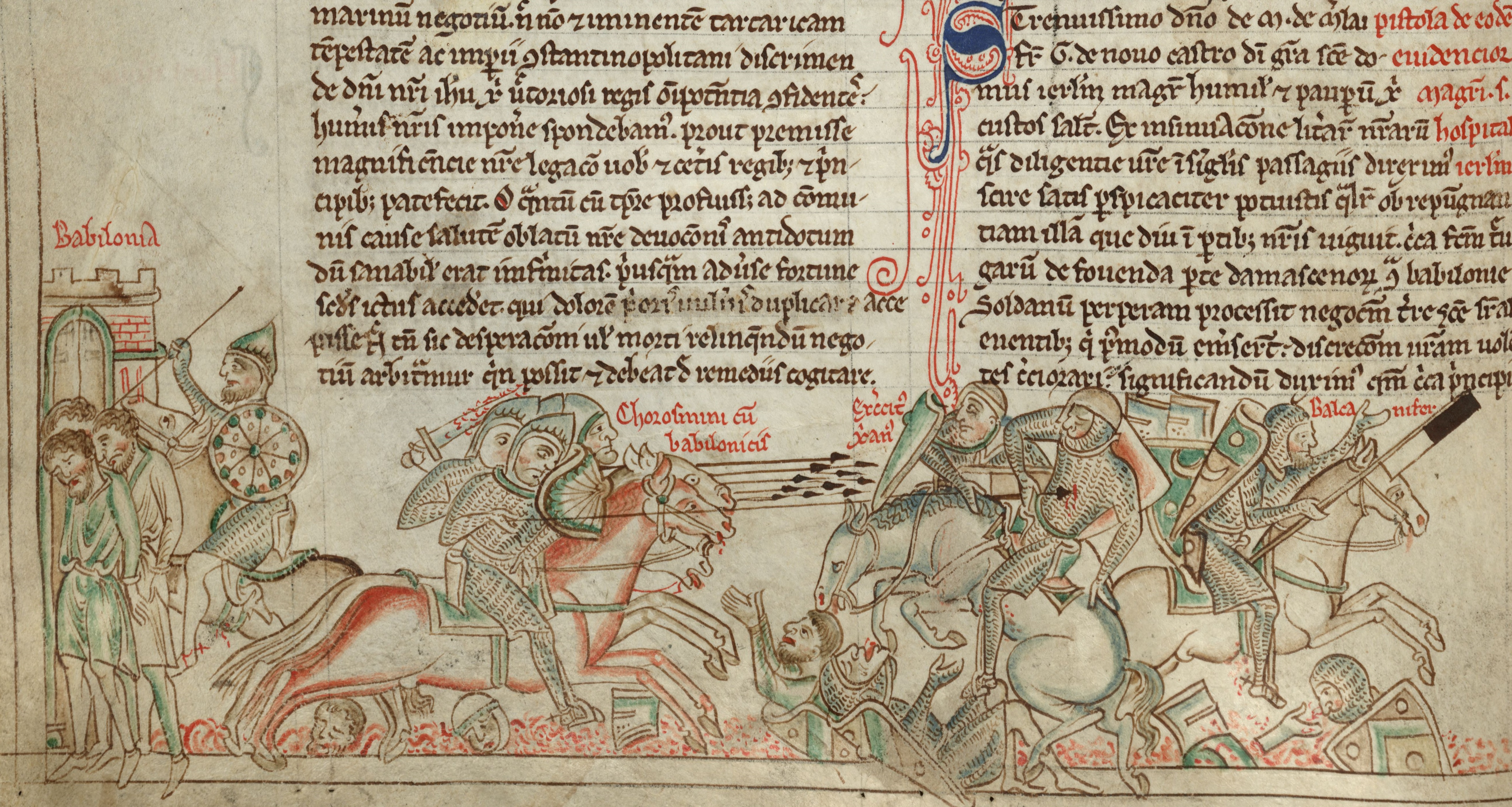
Battle of La Forbie (1244)

1245

- Summer. Pope Innocent IV proclaims the Seventh Crusade.
- October. Ayyub occupies Damascus.

1246

- Alice dies and her son, Henry I of Cyprus, succeeds her as regent. He appoints Balian of Beirut as bailiff and grants Tyre to Philip of Montfort.

c. 1247

- Henry grants the County of Jaffa and the Lordship of Ramla to John of Ibelin.

1247

- June 17. Ayyub occupies Tiberias.
- Late June. Mount Tabor and Belvoir surrender to Ayyub's troops.
- October 15. The Egyptians capture Ascalon.
- Balian of Beirut dies, and Henry appoints John of Arsuf as bailiff.

1248

- September 17. Louis IX of France and French crusaders arrive at Limassol to make preparations for the invasion of Egypt. Henry replaces John of Arsuf with the knight John Foignon as bailiff.

1249

- June 5. Louis invade Egypt.
- Autumn. Henry again appoints John of Arsuf as bailiff.
- November 23. Ayyub dies, but his retainers keep his death secret until the arrival of his son and successor, Al-Muazzam Turanshah.

c. 1250

- The Livre des Assises de la Cour des Bourgeois—a legal treatise on the laws regarding the burghers and their courts—is completed.

1250

- February 24. The Egyptians impose a blockade on the crusaders' camp.
- May 2. Turanshah's Mamluk (or slave) guards kill him and make their commander, Aybak, the new ruler of Egypt.
- May 6. Louis agrees to leave Egypt.
- May 13. Louis arrives at Acre and becomes the actual ruler of the kingdom.
- Winter. Acre's suburbs are fortified.

1251

- Summer. Caesarea is fortified.

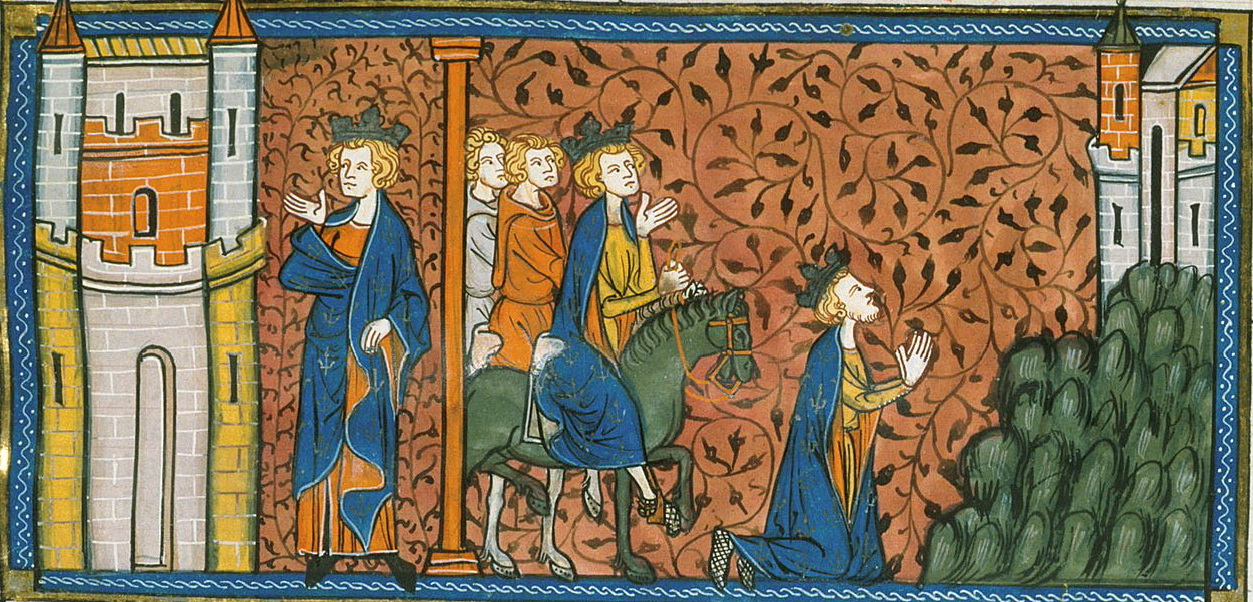
Louis IX at a rebuilt fortress and at Nazareth (1250–1252)

1252

- Summer. Jaffa is fortified.

1253

- January 18. Henry dies.
- June. Louis sends William Rubruck and Bartholomew of Cremona to Karakorum to propose an alliance to Möngke, Great Khan of the Mongols, against the Muslim powers.

1254

- March 6. Conrad dies in Lavello in Italy. His two-year-old son Conradin remains in Bavaria under the guardianship of his uncle, Louis II, Duke of Bavaria.
- April 24. Louis leaves Acre for France. He leaves 100 knights behind under the command of Geoffrey of Sergines.
- June 8. Patriarch Robert dies.

1255

- February. John of Jaffa succeeds John of Arsuf as bailiff. He concludes a 10-year truce with An-Nasir Yusuf, the ruler of Damascus.
- April. Pope Alexander IV appoints Jacques Pantaleon as patriarch.
- Late December. Geoffrey of Sergines raids the region of Ascalon and Gaza.

1256

- June. A dispute over property rights in the estates of the Greek Orthodox monastery of Saint Sabas in Acre develops into an armed conflict between the Venetians and the Genoese. Philip of Montfort expels the Venetians from Tyre.

1257

- July. The Venetians conclude an alliance with the Pisans.
- August. John of Arsuf grants commercial privileges to merchants from Ancona who support the Genoese.
- Autumn. The united Venetian and Pisan fleets defeat the Genoese at Acre.

1258

- February. John of Arsuf and the Templars' grand master, Thomas Bérard, convoke the barons and the burghers' representatives to a general assembly. They elect the infant Cypriote king Hugh I as regent for the absent Conradin and appoint Hugh's mother, Plaisance of Antioch, as regent for him. The Genoese, the Hospitallers and their allies do not accept the decision. Plaisance appoints John of Arsuf as her bailiff before she returns to Cyprus.
- February. Möngke's brother, Hülegü, occupies Baghdad, putting an end to the Abbasid Caliphate.
- June. A Venetian fleet routes the Genoese at Acre.
- Late. John of Arsuf dies.

1259

- May. Plaisance makes Geoffrey of Sergines her bailiff.
- September. The Mongols invade Syria. Hethum I of Cilician Armenia, and Bohemond VI of Antioch join the Mongols, but the Jerusalemite barons remain neutral.

1260

- Summer. The Jerusalemite barons reject a proposal for an anti-Mongol alliance by the Mamluk Sultan of Egypt, Qutuz, but allow the Mamluk troops to march across the kingdom.
- September 3. Battle of Ain Jalut: the Mamluks overcome the Mongol army.
- October 24. Baibars murders Qutuz and the Mamluks acclaim him sultan.

1261

- John of Arsuf begins selling his estates to the Hospitallers.
- August 29. The cardinals elect Jacques Pantaleon as Pope Urban IV.
- September. Plaisance dies.

1262

- November. Pope Urban makes William of Agen patriarch.

1263

- March. Baibars pillages Nazareth and Bethlehem and destroys the Church of the Nativity.
- April 4. Baibars unsuccessfully besieges Acre.
- Hugh's aunt, Isabella of Cyprus, comes to Acre to exercise the regency on his behalf in Jerusalem. She appoints her husband, Henry of Antioch, as bailiff, but the High Court refuses to install them without Hugh's presence.

1264

- June. The Hospitallers and the Templars raid the region of Ascalon. Baibars pillages the environs of Caesarea and Chastel Pelerin.
- July. Pope Urban urges the prelates, the grand masters of the military orders and the most influential barons to resolve their conflicts.
- Isabella dies. Her son, Hugh of Antioch-Lusignan, and his cousin, Hugh of Brienne, claim the right to exercise the regency on Hugh of Cyprus's behalf in Jerusalem. The High Court confirms Hugh of Antioch-Lusignan's claim.

c. 1265

- John of Jaffa completes Le Livre des Assises (the most complete treatise on the laws of Jerusalem).

1265

- March 5. Baibars captures and destroys Caesarea.
- March 16. Baibars destroys Haifa.
- April 30. Baibars destroys Arsuf.

1266

- July 22. Baibars captures Safed, Toron and Chastel Neuf.

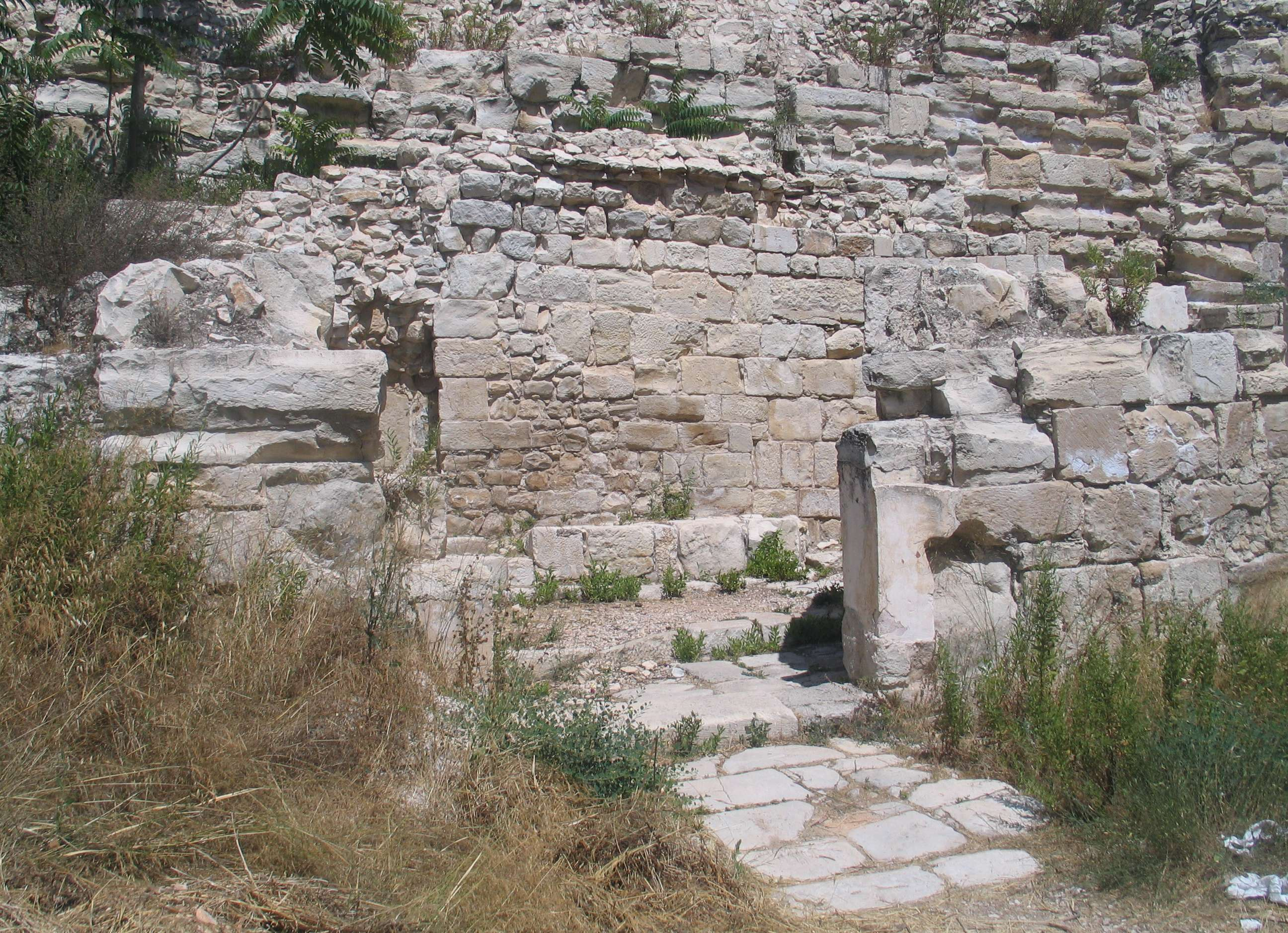
Ruins of the fortress at Safed, captured in 1266 by Baibars

- October. Hugh of Antioch-Lusignan, Geoffrey of Sergines and the military orders raid Galilee.

1267

- December. Hugh of Cyprus dies. Hugh of Antioch-Lusignan succeeds him as Hugh III.

1268

- March 7. Baibars destroys Jaffa.
- April 15. Baibars seizes Belfort.
- May. The High Court elects Hugh III of Cyprus as regent for Conradin, ignoring the claim of Hugh's aunt, Maria of Antioch.
- August 23. Battle of Tagliacozzo: Charles I of Anjou, King of Sicily, routes Conradin in Italy.
- October 29. Conradin is beheaded in Naples.

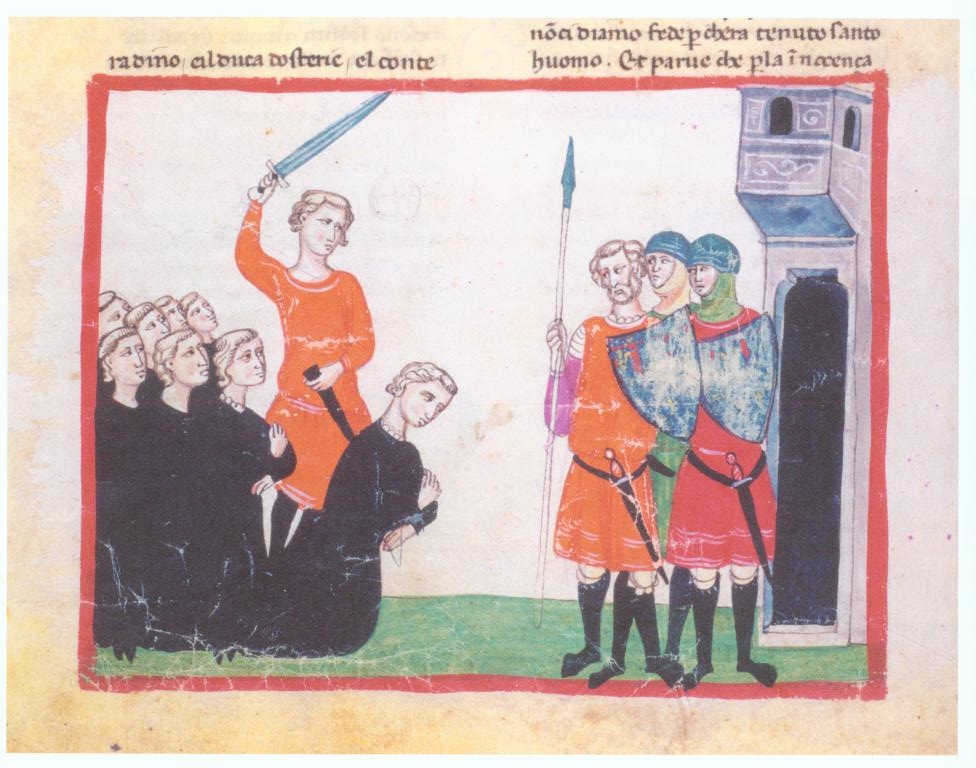
Conradin is executed in Naples (1268).

=== Final years (1269–1291) ===
1269

- September 24. Hugh III of Cyprus and Maria of Antioch lay claim to Jerusalem before the High Court. Hugh is elected and crowned king in Tyre.
- Late October. Two natural sons of James I of Aragon, Fernán Sánchez and Pedro Fernández, and Aragonese crusaders arrive at Acre.
- November. Baibars routes the Aragonese near Acre.

1270

- The Venetians and the Genoese conclude a truce and the Genoese return to Acre.

1271

- May 9. The English crown prince Edward and English crusaders land at Acre.
- May–June. Edward unsuccessfully besieges Qaqun on Mount Carmel.
- June 23. Baibars captures the Teutonic Knights' fortress at Montfort.
- July. The Cypriot nobles decline to come to fight in the Kingdom of Jerusalem.
- John of Montfort, Lord of Tyre, concludes a truce with Baibars.

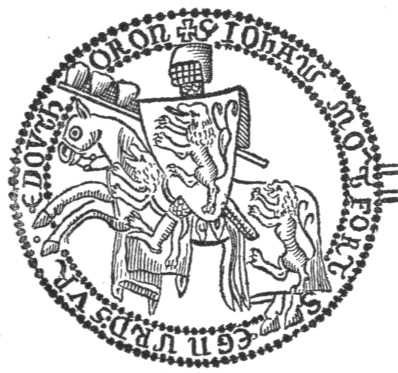
Seal of John of Montfort, Lord of Tyre: he concludes a truce with Baibars in 1271.

1272

- May 12. Hugh and Baibars conclude a ten-year truce.
- c. September 30. Edward abandon his crusade.

1274

- May 7–July 17. Second Council of Lyon: a plan for a new crusade is adopted. Pope Gregory X persuades Charles of Anjou to start negotiations for the purchase of Mary of Antioch's claim to Jerusalem.

1276

- October. After the Templars buy an estate near Acre without royal consent, Hugh leaves for Cyprus.

1277

- March 18. Maria of Antioch sells her claim to Jerusalem to Charles. The Venetians, the Templars and the French garrison in Acre acknowledge him as Jerusalem's lawful king.

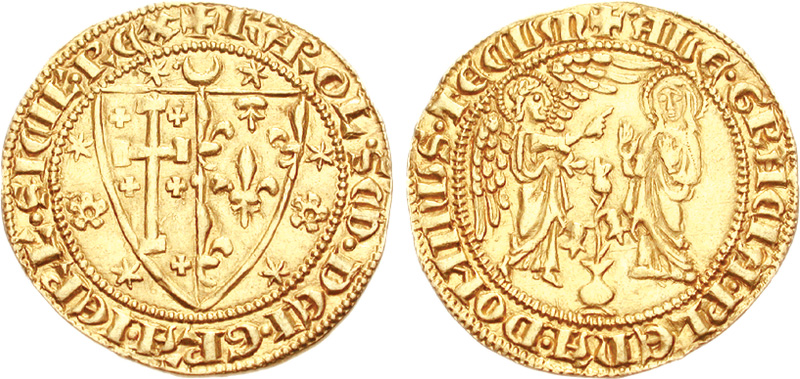
Golden coin with an inscription mentioning Charles I of Anjou as king of Jerusalem and Sicily (1277)

- May–June. Charles appoints Roger of San Severino as his bailiff. San Severino takes possession of the royal castle in Acre without opposition.
- July 1. Baibars dies and his son, Al-Said Barakah, succeeds him.
- July. Guillaume de Beaujeu, the Templars' grand master, mediates a reconciliation between John of Montfort and the Venetians. The Venetians acknowledge John's rule in Tyre and John restores their quarter to them.
- September. Patriarch Thomas dies. The canons of the Holy Sepulchre ask the Pope to translate the Archbishop of Naples (whose see was located in Charles's realm) to Jerusalem.

1279

- May. Pope Honorius IV appoints Elias, Bishop of Périgueux, as patriarch.
- August. Al-Mansur Qalawun becomes the sultan of Egypt.
- The Templars prevent Hugh from attacking San Severino at Acre.

1281

- May. Qalawun concludes a truce with the kingdom.

1282

- April. After the Sicilian Vespers, Charles recalls San Severino to Italy. Before leaving Acre, San Severino appoints Odo Poilechien as his deputy in Acre.

1283

- Burchard of Mount Sion completes his Description of the Holy Land about his travels in the Holy Land and the neighboring territories.

1284

- March 4. Hugh dies in Tyre. In the Jerusalemite kingdom, his 17-year-old son, John II, is only recognized in Beirut and Tyre.

1285

- January 7. Charles dies. His son Charles II of Naples inherits his claim to Jerusalem.
- May 20. John dies and his brother, Henry II, succeeds him.

1286

- June 24. Henry arrives at Acre where the military orders acknowledge him as the lawful king.
- June 29. Poilechien surrenders the citadel of Acre to Henry.
- August 15. Henry is crowned in Tyre.

1287

- c. December 31. Patriarch Elias dies in Rome.

1289

- Early. Pope Nicholas IV appoints Nicholas of Hanapes as patriarch.
- July. Qalawun and Henry conclude a ten-year truce.

1290

- Early. Pope Nicholas calls for a new crusade for the defence of Acre.
- c. August 15. Italian crusaders arrive at Acre and murder Muslim merchants.
- Late August. Italian crusaders massacre all bearded men in Acre. Qalawun demands the extradition of the murderers, but the Frank authorities refuse it.
- November 10. Qalawun dies. His son, Al-Ashraf Khalil, succeeds him.

1291

- April 5. Al-Ashraf Khalil lays siege to Acre.

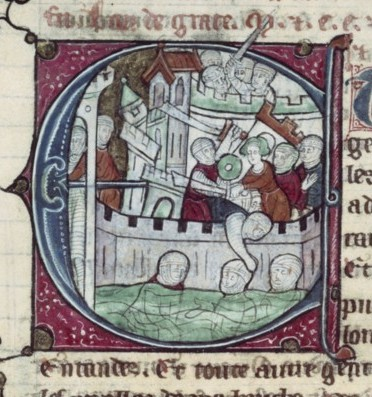
Siege of Acre (1291)

- Early May. Henry and Cypriot knights come to Acre.
- May 19. Tyre surrenders to the Mamluks without resistance.
- Late May. Henry flee from Acre. Patriarch Nicholas drowns while fleeing from the town.
- May 28. The Mamluks capture Acre, and massacred or enslave the townspeople.
- July 14. The Mamluks capture Sidon.
- July 31. The Mamluk seize Beirut.

== Aftermath ==
1290s

- Henry issues new Cypriot coins with an inscription mentioning his title of King of Jerusalem, and displaying the Cross of Jerusalem on the reverse.

1295

- Charles offers his claim to Jerusalem to James II of Aragon during their negotiations over Sicily.

1299

- Charles offers his claim to Jerusalem to Frederick III of Sicily as part of his daughter's dowry.

1309–1311

- The Aragonese attempt to convince Charles's successor, Robert, King of Naples, to renounce his claim to Jerusalem in favor of Frederick III.

1335

- During his visit in Cyprus, James of Verona is informed that the women wear black in mourning for the occupation of the towns on the Syrian coast by the Muslims.

== See also ==
- Timeline of the Principality of Antioch

== Sources ==
- Asbridge, Thomas (2005) [2004]. The First Crusade: A New History. Simon & Schuster. ISBN 978-0-7432-2084-2.
- Bird, Jessalynn; Peters, Edward; Powell, James M., eds. (2013). Crusade and Christendom: Annotated Documents in Translation from Innocent III to the Fall of Acre, 1187-1291. Middle Ages. University of Pennsylvania Press. ISBN 978-0-8122-4478-6.
- Baldwin, Marshall W. (1969) [1955]. "The Latin States under Baldwin III and Amalric I, 1143–1174; The Decline and Fall of Jerusalem, 1174–1189". In Setton, Kenneth M.; Baldwin, Marshall W. (eds.). The First Hundred Years. A History of the Crusades. Vol. I. University of Wisconsin Press. pp. 528–561, 590–621. ISBN 978-1-58684-251-2.
- Barber, Malcolm (2012). The Crusader States. Yale University Press. ISBN 978-0-300-11312-9.
- Boas, Adrian J. (1999). Crusader Archaeology: The Material Culture of the Latin East. Routledge. ISBN 978-0-415-17361-2.
- Christie, Niall (2020) [2014]. Muslims and Crusaders: Christianity's Wars in the Middle East, 1095–1382, from the Islamic Sources, 2nd ed. Routledge. ISBN 978-1-138-54310-2.
- Edbury, Peter W. (1994) [1991]. Kingdom of Cyprus and the Crusades. Cambridge University Press. ISBN 978-0-521-45837-5.
- Edbury, Peter W. (1997). John of Ibelin and the Kingdom of Jerusalem. Boydell Press. ISBN 978-0-85115-703-0.
- Hamilton, Bernard (2016) [1980]. The Latin Church in the Crusader States: The Secular Church. Routledge. ISBN 978-0-86078-072-4.
- Hamilton, Bernard; Jotischky, Andrew (2020). Latin and Greek Monasticism in the Crusader States. Cambridge University Press. ISBN 978-0-521-83638-8.
- Hardwicke, Mary Nickerson (1969) [1962]. "The Crusader States, 1192–1243". In Setton, Kenneth M.; Wolff, Robert Lee; Hazard, Harry (eds.). The Later Crusades, 1189–1311, The First Hundred Years. A History of the Crusades. Vol. II. University of Wisconsin Press. pp. 522–554. ISBN 978-0-299-04844-0.
- Hillenbrand, Carole (2018) [1999]. The Crusades: Islamic Perspectives. Edinburgh University Press. ISBN 978-0-7486-0630-6.
- Hodgson, Natasha R. (2017) [2007]. Women, Crusading and the Holy Land in Historical Narrative. Warfare in History. Boydell Press. ISBN 978-1-78327-270-9.
- Holt, P. M. (2004). The Crusader States an their Neighbours. Pearson Education. ISBN 978-0-582-36931-3.
- Jotischky, Andrew (2017) [2004]. Crusading and the Crusader States. Recovering the past. Routledge. ISBN 978-1-138-80806-5.
- Kedar, Benjamin Z. (1999). "On the Origins of the Earliest Laws of Frankish Jerusalem: The Canons of the Council of Nablus, 1120". Speculum. 74 (2): 310–335. doi:10.2307/2887049. ISSN 0038-7134. JSTOR 2887049. S2CID 159687796.
- Lock, Peter (2006). The Routledge Companion to the Crusades. Routledge companions to history. Routledge. ISBN 978-0-415-39312-6.
- Maalouf, Amin (2006) [1983]. The Crusades Through Arab Eyes. Translated by Jon Rothschild. SAQI. ISBN 978-0-86356-023-1.
- MacEvitt, Christopher (2008). The Crusades and the Christian World of the East: Rough Tolerance. Middle Ages. University of Pennsylvania Press. ISBN 978-0-8122-2083-4.
- Nicholson, Robert L. (1969). "The Growth of the Latin States, 1118–1144". In Setton, Kenneth M.; Baldwin, Marshall W. (eds.). The First Hundred Years. A History of the Crusades. Vol. I. University of Wisconsin Press. pp. 410–447. ISBN 978-1-58684-251-2.
- Painter, Sidney (1969). "The Crusade of Theobald of Champagne and Richard of Cornwall, 1239–1241". In Setton, Kenneth M.; Wolff, Robert Lee; Hazard, Harry (eds.). A History of the Crusades, Volume II: The Later Crusades, 1189–1311. University of Wisconsin Press. pp. 463–485. ISBN 978-0-299-04844-0.
- Perry, Guy (2013). John of Brienne: King of Jerusalem, Emperor of Constantinople, c. 1175–1237. Cambridge University Press. ISBN 978-1-107-04310-7.
- Phillips, Jonathan (2010). Holy Warriors: A Modern History of the Crusades. Vintage Books. ISBN 978-1-84595-078-1.
- Prawer, Joshua (1998) [1980]. Crusader Institutions. Oxford University Press. ISBN 978-0-19-822536-2.
- Pringle, Denys (2022). Three Pilgrimages to the Holy Land - Saewulf: A True Account of the Situation of Jerusalem, John of Würzburg: A Description of the Places of the Holy Land, Theoderic: A Little Book of the Holy Places. Brepols. ISBN 978-2-503-59372-2.
- Runciman, Sir Steven (1969). "The Pilgrimages to Palestine before 1095". In Baldwin, Marshall W. (ed.). The First Hundred Years. A History of the Crusades. Vol. One (second ed.). University of Wisconsin Press. pp. 68–78. ISBN 978-0-299-04834-1.
- Riley-Smith, Jonathan (2012). The Knights Hospitaller in the Levant, c.1070-1309. Palgrave. ISBN 978-1-349-33162-8.
- Shirley, Janet (2021) [1999]. Crusader Syria in the Thirteenth Century. Crusade Texts in Translation. Vol. 5. Routledge. ISBN 978-1-03-218022-9.
- Tyerman, Christopher (2007) [2006]. God's War: A New History of the Crusades. Belknap Press of Harvard University Press. ISBN 978-0-674-02387-1.
