= Peter of Limoges (bishop) =

Archbishop of Caesarea

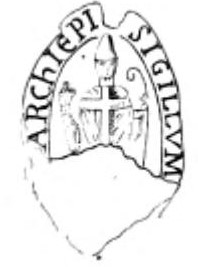
Drawing of a damaged red wax seal impression of Peter. From a vidimus of 1217 of a document dated 6 September 1199. The full inscription read Sigillum Petri Cesarien[sis] Archiepisc[opi], ""seal of Peter, archbishop of Caesarea".

Peter of Limoges (died 1237) was the archbishop of Caesarea from 1199 until his death.

Born in France, Peter was a young man in 1199 when consecrated archbishop by Patriarch Aymar of Jerusalem, who had been transferred to the patriarchate from Caesarea. His appointment came in September or later, since documents from earlier in the year he sealed with his vidimus. In the year of his appointment, he made a gift of a tithe to the Abbey of Saint Mary of the Valley of Jehosaphat. In April 1200, Pope Innocent III charged him with resolving a dispute between the see of Tyre and the republic of Venice.

In 1203, Peter was again chosen to succeed Aymar, this time in the patriarchate. Since the patriarchal electors had been unable to come to an agreement, they delegated the decision to Archbishop Clarembald of Tyre, who chose Peter. This election, however, was quashed by Innocent III, who delegated the decision to Cardinal Soffred, who engineered his own appointment as patriarch. In 1204, Peter signed a joint letter to the pope informing him of the outbreak of the War of the Antiochene Succession. In 1205, he penned a letter (addressee uncertain) announcing the death of King Aimery and lamenting the state of the kingdom of Jerusalem.

In October 1210, Peter attended the coronation of John of Brienne. In January 1213, Innocent III ordered the archdiocese of Nicosia to hold a new election and submit its candidate for approval to Peter of Limoges. In October 1217, Peter attended the council Acre in advance of the Fifth Crusade. The pilgrim and author Thietmar, who visited the Holy Land in 1217–1218, described him as very fat. In 1220, when al-Muʿaẓẓam invaded the Crusader states, Caesarea was captured and Peter co-signed a letter in October addressed to King Philip I of France appealing for assistance. On 15 May 1221, he was with the crusade at Damietta.

In January 1222, Pope Honorius III ordered Peter to bring the non-Latin churches into obedience to his authority in his diocese. In 1226, following a dispute between Patriarch Rainier of Antioch and Prince Bohemond IV of Antioch, Honorius empowered Peter to intervene and restore any rights that had been taken from the patriarch. In October 1227, Peter co-signed a letter to Pope Gregory IX on the state of the kingdom.

Peter governed the patriarchate of Jerusalem between the death of Patriarch Ralph in 1224 and the arrival of his successor, Gerold of Lausanne, in 1228. When the excommunicated Emperor Frederick II landed in Acre at the head of the Sixth Crusade in September 1228, Peter was one of those that met him. Without ecclesiastical approval, Frederick negotiated the Treaty of Jaffa and the Crusaders re-acquired the city of Jerusalem. Peter arrived in the city on 19 March 1229 and, acting on Gerold's orders, placed it under interdict. On the whole, he appears as very loyal to Patriarch Gerold. The incident at Jerusalem seems to have caused him some embarrassment, however. When summoned by the emperor to give an explanation, he failed to appear.

During the civil war that afflicted the kingdom in the 1230s, the Estoire d'Eracles portrays Peter as a mediator between the factions. He played an active role in 1232. In 1234, he donated a church to the Knights of Lazarus. In 1235, he was excommunicated by the incompetent papal legate Archbishop Theodoric of Ravenna. In April 1236, Gregory IX lifted the ban.

Peter last known appearance in the historical record is in September 1236. He died in early 1237. The Annales de Terre Sainte record his death in that year and his successor was in office by May. He died while Gerold was away in Italy.

== Bibliography ==
- Barber, Malcolm (1994). "The Order of Saint Lazarus and the Crusades". The Catholic Historical Review. 80 (3): 439–456. JSTOR 25024318.
- Coureas, Nicholas (1997). The Latin Church in Cyprus, 1195–1312. Routledge.
- Hamilton, Bernard (1980). The Latin Church in the Crusader States: The Secular Church. Ashgate.
- Hazard, Harry W. (1974). "The Sigillography of Crusader Caesarea". In Dickran K. Kouymjian (ed.). Near Eastern Numismatics, Iconography, Epigraphy, and History: Studies in Honor of George C. Miles. American University of Beirut. pp. 359–368.
- Hazard, Harry W. (1975). "Caesarea and the Crusades". Bulletin of the American Schools of Oriental Research. Supplementary Studies (19): 79–114. JSTOR 20066618.
- Van Cleve, Thomas C. (1972). The Emperor Frederick II of Hohenstaufen: Immutator Mundi. Clarendon Press.
