= Aymar the Monk =

Florentine Latin Patriarch of Jerusalem

Aymar the Monk (French: Aymar Le Moine, Latin: Haymarus Monachus; died October 1202), also known as Aimery or Aimaro Monaco dei Corbizzi, was Archbishop of Caesarea and Latin Patriarch of Jerusalem.

== Biography ==
He was born in Florence. From 1171 to 1177 he was magister and chancellor of the patriarch of Jerusalem Amalric of Nesle. At the time this prelate of Florentine origin was simply called "Monachus"; the name "Aymar" and his belonging to the Corbizzi family are instead considered historically unfounded later additions. The noble Corbizzi family was originally from Fiesole in Tuscany.

He was Archbishop of Caesarea in Palestine from 1181 until 1194, when the clergy of the Holy Sepulchre, who desired a patriarch residing in the east, elected him the Latin Patriarch of Jerusalem, the latter seat vacant from 1191. The Monk held this position until his death in Palestine in October 1202. He may have held the position of archbishop of Caesarea together with that of the Patriarch for three years, until 1197. He was present at the siege of Acre and described it in a poem entitled De expugnata Accone liber tetrastichus seu rithmus de expeditione ierosolimitana.

His biography, "Memorie istoriche di Monaco de' Corbizzi fiorentino Patriarca di Gerusalemme" by Giovanni Mariti was published in 1781.

== Notes ==
Catholic Church titles
Preceded by Heraclius	Archbishop of Caesarea; 1181–1194	Succeeded by Peter of Limoges
Preceded by Heraclius	Patriarch of Jerusalem; 1194–1202	Succeeded by Soffredo
