= Yarankash =

12th-century Slave and murderer

- Died: 1146; Mosul
- Conviction: Murder
- Criminal charges: Murder
- Penalty: Execution

Details
- Victims: Imad al-Din Zengi
- Date: September 14, 1146
- Killed: 1
- Weapon: Dagger/Sword

Yarankash (or Yaranqash) (died 1146) was a Frankish slave who assassinated his owner Zengi, the atabeg of Aleppo. According to Damascene chronicler Ibn al-Qalanisi:

Frankish slave Yarankash plotted assassination in September 1146, after the Imad al-Din Zengi drunkenly threatened him with punishment for drinking from his goblet.

... one of [Zengi's] attendants, for whom he had a special affection and in whose company he delighted... who nursed a secret grudge against him on account of some injury previously done to him by the Atabeg, had, on finding an opportunity when he was off his guard in his drunkenness, and with the connivance and assistance of certain of his comrades amongst the attendants, assassinated him in his sleep on the eve of Sunday, 6th Second Rabi' (night of Saturday, 14 September).

Yaranqash stabbed the atabeg numerous times and then fled to the fortress of Qal'at Ja'bar, and then from there to Damascus, "in the confident belief that he would be secure there, openly putting forward his action as a claim to consideration, and imagining that he would be made welcome." The governor, Mu'in ad-Din Unur, instead had him arrested and sent him to Zengi's son Nur al-Din in Aleppo. Nur al-Din sent him along to his brother Sayf al-Din Ghazi I in Mosul, who had him executed.

== Sources ==
- Steven Runciman, A History of the Crusades, Vol. II: The Kingdom of Jerusalem. Cambridge University Press, 1952.
- The Damascus Chronicle of the Crusades, Extracted and Translated from the Chronicle of Ibn al-Qalanisi. H.A.R. Gibb, 1932 (reprint, Dover Publications, 2002).
