= Shams al-Din Muhammad ibn al-Muqaddam =

Ayyubid emir of Baalbek from 1175 to 1178

Shams al-Din Muhammad

Emir of Baalbek
- Reign: 1175–1178
- Predecessor: Emirate established
- Successor: Turan-shah
- Died: 9 February 1188; Mount Arafat, Makkah
Names
- Shams al-Din Muhammad ibn al-Muqaddam
- Religion: Sunni Islam

Shams al-Din Muhammad ibn al-Muqaddam (Arabic: شمس الدين ابن المقدم; died on 9 February 1188) was the 1st Emir of Baalbek under Ayyubid Dynasty, Although he was not from Ayyubid origin. He was a military commander first in the service of Nur ad-Din, the Zengid ruler of Syria and Iraq, later of Saladin, the Ayyubid ruler of Egypt, Syria and Iraq.

== Biography ==
When Nur ad-Din died in 1174, Ibn al-Muqaddam emerged as the head of a powerful group of military commanders and high officials who wanted to assume power in Damascus. They could not prevent their rival the eunuch Gümüshtekin from assuming the guardianship for Nur ad-Din's 11-year-old son and heir, As-Salih Ismail al-Malik, and taking him to Aleppo. After Gümüshtekin made an alliance with Nur ad-Din's nephew Sayf al-Din Ghazi II of Mosul against him, he approached Saladin for assistance and allowed him to seize Damascus peacefully. Saladin awarded him with the iqta' grant of Baalbek. When Saladin's brother, Turan-Shah, requested Baalbek from Saladin in 1179, Saladin offered Ibn al-Muqaddam to exchange Balbeek for a larger domain, but Ibn al-Muqaddam refused. Saladin besieged Baalbek and Ibn al-Muqaddam was forced to surrender it in return for Baarin, Kafartab and smaller settlements. In 1182, Saladin entrusted him as the muḥakkim (arbitrator) and overseer of "all the Arabs" who was responsible for "making the customary payments to them and collecting the customary dues from them". While on the Hajj, he was wounded in the eyes during a skirmish between Syrian and Iraqi pilgrims in the tent of the Iraqi pilgrims' leader at Mount Arafat, where he eventually died on 9 February 1188.

== Sources ==
- Hiyari, Mustafa A. (1975). "The Origins and Development of the Amīrate of the Arabs during the Seventh/Thirteenth and Eighth/Fourteenth Centuries". Bulletin of the School of Oriental and African Studies. 38 (3): 509–524. doi:10.1017/s0041977x00048060. JSTOR 613705. S2CID 178868071.
- Köhler, Michael A. (2013). Alliances and Treaties between Frankish and Muslim Rulers in the Middle East: Cross-Cultural Diplomacy in the Period of the Crusades. Translated by Peter M. Holt. Brill Publishers. ISBN 978-90-04-24857-1.
- Lyons, Malcolm Cameron (1984). Saladin: The Politics of the Holy War. Cambridge University Press. ISBN 0-521-317398.
