= Mu'in ad-Din Unur =

Ruler of Damascus from 1140 to 1149

Co-Ruler of Damascus
- In office 1140–1149 (co-rule with Mujir ad-Din)

Personal details
- Died: August 28, 1149
- Children: Ismat ad-Din

Mu'in ad-Din Unur (Arabic: معين الدين أنر, romanized: Muʿīn ad-Dīn ʿUnur; died August 28, 1149) was the ruler of Damascus from 1140 to 1149. He was a Turkoman slave of Burid emirs.

== Origins ==
Mu'in ad-Din was originally a Mamluk in the army of Toghtekin, the founder of the Burid Dynasty of Damascus. When Zengi, the atabeg of Aleppo, besieged Damascus in 1135, Mu'in ad-Din was at the head of the army defending the city. That year the Burid Shihab ad-Din Mahmud took control of Damascus after the assassination of his brother; when Zengi gave up the siege and instead besieged Homs, Shihab ad-Din sent Yusuf ibn Firuz and Mu'in ad-Din to govern it, with Yusuf acting as Mu'in ad-Din's lieutenant. In 1137 Mu'in ad-Din was still governor of Homs when the city was briefly besieged again by Zengi. In 1138, Shihab ad-Din appointed Mu'in ad-Din atabeg of Damascus and gave him the title Isfahsalar. Later in 1138, Zengi negotiated a marriage between himself and Shihab ad-Din's mother Khatun Safwat al-Mulk, and as part of the settlement Zengi received Homs. Mu'in ad-Din was given the castle of Barin in place of Homs. On June 22, 1139, Shihab ad-Din was assassinated in Damascus; Jamal ad-Din, emir of Baalbek, was chosen as his successor, and Mu'in ad-Din was chosen to govern Baalbek in his absence. He was in charge of the defenses of Baalbek when Zengi arrived to avenge the murder of his stepson. Zengi besieged it with 14 catapults and the city surrendered to him.

== Governor of Damascus ==
In 1140, Jamal ad-Din died, and Mu'in ad-Din continued to rule as regent for Jamal ad-Din's son Mujir ad-Din Abaq. That year, Mu'in ad-Din besieged Banias with help from King Fulk of Jerusalem and Prince Raymond of Antioch; Mu'in ad-Din offered 20,000 pieces of gold per month to pay for their expenses. When it was captured, Mu'in ad-Din handed it over to Fulk and returned to Damascus. A more thorough alliance, to protect Damascus against Zengi, was negotiated during a visit by Mu'in ad-Din to Jerusalem, accompanied by the future chronicler Usamah ibn Munqidh.

King Fulk died in 1143, and Zengi was assassinated in 1146. Zengi was succeeded by his sons Saif ad-Din Ghazi I in Mosul and Nur ad-Din in Aleppo, and Mu'in ad-Din took the opportunity to besiege Baalbek; the governor, Najm ad-Din Ayyub, father of Saladin, quickly surrendered to him. Mu'in ad-Din also asserted control over Homs and Hama, and sent Yarankash, the assassin of Zengi, to Nur ad-Din, after Yarankash sought refuge in Damascus.

Mu'in ad-Din was always suspicious of Nur ad-Din's power, but it was his policy to remain on friendly terms with his neighbours wherever possible, whether they were Christian or Muslim. In 1147 Nur ad-Din and Mu'in ad-Din negotiated an alliance, in which Nur ad-Din married Mu'in ad-Din's daughter Ismat ad-Din Khatun. Having established peace with Aleppo, Mu'in ad-Din set out to besiege Salkhad and Bosra, after their governor, Altuntash, allied with Jerusalem against him. This broke Jerusalem's treaty with Damascus, forcing Mu'in ad-Din to turn to Nur ad-Din for assistance. Nur ad-Din arrived with the army of Aleppo, and the crusaders were forced to withdraw; both Bosra and Sarkhad then surrendered to Mu'in ad-Din. In August 1147 Mu'in ad-Din was formally recognized as governor of Damascus by the Caliph of Baghdad Al-Muqtafi and the Seljuk Sultan Mas'ud, and he was also recognized formally by the Fatimid Caliph in Egypt, al-Hafiz.

== Second Crusade ==
In 1148, news reached Damascus of a new crusade, called in response to Zengi's capture of Edessa in 1145. Mu'in ad-Din prepared for the inevitable siege, although he had hoped his former alliance with Jerusalem could be restored and that the crusade would attack some other city. When the crusaders arrived in July, according to Ibn al-Qalanisi, Mu'in ad-Din "distinguished himself in combat with them, and displayed a valour, steadfastness and gallantry such as was never seen in any other, never wearying in repelling them nor taking respite from the struggle against them." Mu'in ad-Din reluctantly sent for help from Nur ad-Din and Saif ad-Din Ghazi, whose power he did not wish to see extend as far south as Damascus, and the crusaders besieged the city for only four days before withdrawing. It is possible that Mu'in ad-Din had bribed the crusaders to leave before Nur ad-Din arrived. After this success, the three emirs besieged the castle of Araima in the County of Tripoli, but Mu'in ad-Din was forced to acknowledge Nur ad-Din as his overlord.

In 1149, Mu'in ad-Din led raids against crusader territory, in response to their raids against the territory of Damascus which they continued to make after the failure of their siege. He agreed to a two-year truce with King Baldwin III, and then joined Nur ad-Din against the Principality of Antioch. Mu'in ad-Din patrolled the Hauran with his army while Nur ad-Din defeated Antioch at the Battle of Inab that year, in which Prince Raymond was killed.

== Death, family and legacy ==
After returning to Damascus in July 1149, Mu'in ad-Din "ate a hearty meal, as was his usual custom, and was seized thereafter by a loosening of the bowels...From this resulted in the disease known as dysentery..." The emir died on August 28 and was buried in the university he had established in the city.

As he had been acting as regent for Mujir ad-Din Abaq, the latter took his place as the rightful heir of Damascus. Mujir ad-Din was a weak ruler, however, and by 1154 Nur ad-Din was fully in control of the city and all of Syria.

Mu'in ad-Din had three daughters, who married Nur ad-Din, Mujir ad-Din, and a soldier named Margar respectively.

In addition to Ibn al-Qalanisi's favourable depiction of him, the Christian chronicler William of Tyre also speaks very highly of Mu'in ad-Din: he showed "sincere fidelity" in his negotiations with the Kingdom of Jerusalem, and was "a man of much wisdom and a lover of our people." William of Tyre rendered his names in Latin as Meheneddin for Mu'in ad-Din and Anardus for Unur.

== Sources ==
- Steven Runciman, A History of the Crusades, vol. II: The Kingdom of Jerusalem. Cambridge University Press, 1952.
- The Damascus Chronicle of the Crusades, Extracted and Translated from the Chronicle of Ibn al-Qalanisi. H.A.R. Gibb, 1932 (reprint, Dover Publications, 2002).
- William of Tyre, A History of Deeds Done Beyond the Sea, trans. E.A. Babcock and A.C. Krey. Columbia University Press, 1943.

Regnal titles
Preceded by Jamal ad-Din Muhammad	Emir of Damascus; 1140–1149 with Mujir ad-Din (1140–1149)	Succeeded by Mujir ad-Din
