= Battle of Bosra (1147) =

Battle during the Second Crusade

Coordinates: 32°31′0″N 36°29′0″E

- Part of the Crusades
Date	Summer 1147
Location	Bosra, Burid Emirate
Result	Inconclusive

Belligerents
Kingdom of Jerusalem	Damascus; Mosul and Aleppo

Commanders and leaders
Baldwin III of Jerusalem	Mu'in ad-Din Unur; Nur ad-Din Zangi

Strength
Unknown	Unknown

Casualties and losses
Light	Light

The Battle of Bosra was a lengthy and ultimately inconclusive battle fought in the spring of 1147 during the Second Crusade, between a Crusader force commanded by King Baldwin III of Jerusalem and Turkish forces from Damascus led by Mu'in ad-Din Unur, who was aided by Nur ad-Din's contingent from Mosul and Aleppo. Irritated by his Damascus overlord, the emir of Bosra and Salkhad invited the Crusaders to occupy the two places. Before the Latin army could take possession of Bosra, the emir's wife allowed a Damascene garrison into the city, and the thwarted Crusaders were forced to retreat via a grueling march through enemy territory. The Turks constantly harassed the retreating column but were unable to secure a inflict a defeat.

== Background ==
In the spring of 1147, Altuntash, emir of Bosra and Salkhad, squabbled with his nominal superior, Mu'in ad-Din Unur, ruler of Damascus. Offended, Altuntash allied himself with the Crusaders and agreed to hand over his two cities. These were located about 65 mi (105 km) southeast of Damascus and 15 mi (24 km) apart. Though the seizure of Bosra and Salkhad meant breaking a treaty with Damascus and the likelihood of resistance from the Damascus army as well as from Nur ad-Din, King Baldwin III of Jerusalem led his army toward Bosra.

== Running battle ==
Soon after the Crusader march began, the Damascene army showed up in great strength to contest their advance. Many Latin soldiers were eager for battle, but more cautious heads prevailed. Posting extra guards to watch for a surprise attack, the army made camp and spent the night. After a council of war the next day, Baldwin and his officers determined to continue the expedition to Bosra in a fighting march. The army moved in the usual formation when opposed by an army of Turkish horse archers. Provision was made to oppose attacks on the vanguard, the flanks and the rear. The Crusader foot soldiers marched in close formation with foot archers ready to fire back at the Turkish horse archers and spearmen ready to repel a direct attack. "In order to maintain the solidity of the column, the pace of the mounted troops was made to conform to that of the infantry."

For four days, the Crusaders advanced toward their intended goal, under constant archery and probing attacks. Further, the soldiers were bedeviled by thirst in the hot summer weather. When they arrived at Bosra, they managed to obtain water and other supplies. Their hopes were dashed when they found that Altuntash's wife had introduced a Damascene garrison into Bosra's citadel. Unwilling to chance a siege close to an enemy host, Baldwin elected to withdraw.

The Crusaders suffered even worse on their return march from the heat, dust and constant harassment by the Turks. One day, the Turks set fire to the dry brush upwind of the retreating army, adding to their misery. The Crusaders carried their dead and wounded with them so that their enemies would not be encouraged by their losses. "Any man who left his place in the ranks was threatened with severe penalties." Leaving the ranks without permission was forbidden. However, one exception a knight who was allowed to rescue a soldier if he was about to be killed by a Muslim.

As the Crusaders neared their own territories, the Turks redoubled their attacks on the rearguard, trying to separate it from the rest of the formation. Near the moment of crisis, a Turk rode out without leave and killed an opponent in personal combat. This so dismayed the Damascenes and encouraged the Franks that "excuses were found for his breach of orders." Ultimately, the Turks were unable to stop the Crusader army from recrossing the Jordan and safely returning to the Kingdom of Jerusalem. The running battle lasted 12 days.

== Aftermath ==
Baldwin's bid to capture Bosra and Salkhad was a strategic failure. Mu'in ad-Din Unur seized control of both cities soon afterward. The Second Crusade continued, with the next actions involving Crusaders being the Second Battle of Dorylaeum in late 1147, the Siege of Damascus in 1148 and the Battle of Inab in 1149.
