= Altuntash (governor of Bosra) =

12th-century Armenian adventurer

Altuntash was a 12th-century adventurer who established a short-lived autonomous territory in the Hauran.

Altuntash was an Armenian who converted to Islam and adopted Turkic customs. He served as a ghulam (slave-soldier) to Gümüshtekin, the former governor of Salkhad.

Altuntash became a lieutenant of Mu'in ad-Din Unur, ruler of Damascus, and governed Bosra and Salkhad in Unur's name. In 1147 he attempted to break free from Unur and turned to the Kingdom of Jerusalem for support. He proposed to deliver Bosra and Salkhad to the kingdom in return for a lordship in the Hauran. Unur acted quickly, laid a siege, and prevented Altuntash from returning to either Bosra or Salkhad. Damascus was allied to Jerusalem, and so Queen Melisende and her council declined to attack Damascene territory and instead informed Unur that their army would restore Altuntash. Unur objected to this assistance to his rebellious vassal and convinced Jerusalem to desist. The army had already been assembled, however, and demanded action. King Baldwin III gave in and marched to the Hauran. Unur struck an alliance with the ruler of Aleppo, Nur ad-Din, and hurried to Salkhad, where Altuntash's garrison asked for a truce. Unur and Nur ad-Din then marched on Bosra, which was surrendered to them by Altuntash's wife.

Baldwin was soundly defeated by Nur ad-Din, and Unur recovered the Hauran. Altuntash came to Damascus to ask for a pardon, but was blinded and imprisoned. According to the chronicler Ibn al-Qalanisi, Altuntash himself had earlier blinded a brother. Altuntash was allowed to spend the rest of his life in a house in Damascus.

== Bibliography ==
- Gibb, H. A. R. (6 December 2012). The Damascus Chronicle of the Crusades: Extracted and Translated from the Chronicle of Ibn Al-Qalanisi. Courier Corporation. ISBN 978-0-486-14340-8.
- Nicolle, David (2007). Crusader Warfare. Hambledon Continuum. ISBN 978-1-84725-146-6.
- Runciman, Steven (1952). A History of the Crusades: The Kingdom of Jerusalem and the Frankish East, 1100–1187. Vol. 2. Cambridge University Press. ISBN 0241298768.
