= Qutb al-Din Mawdud =

- Emir of Mosul
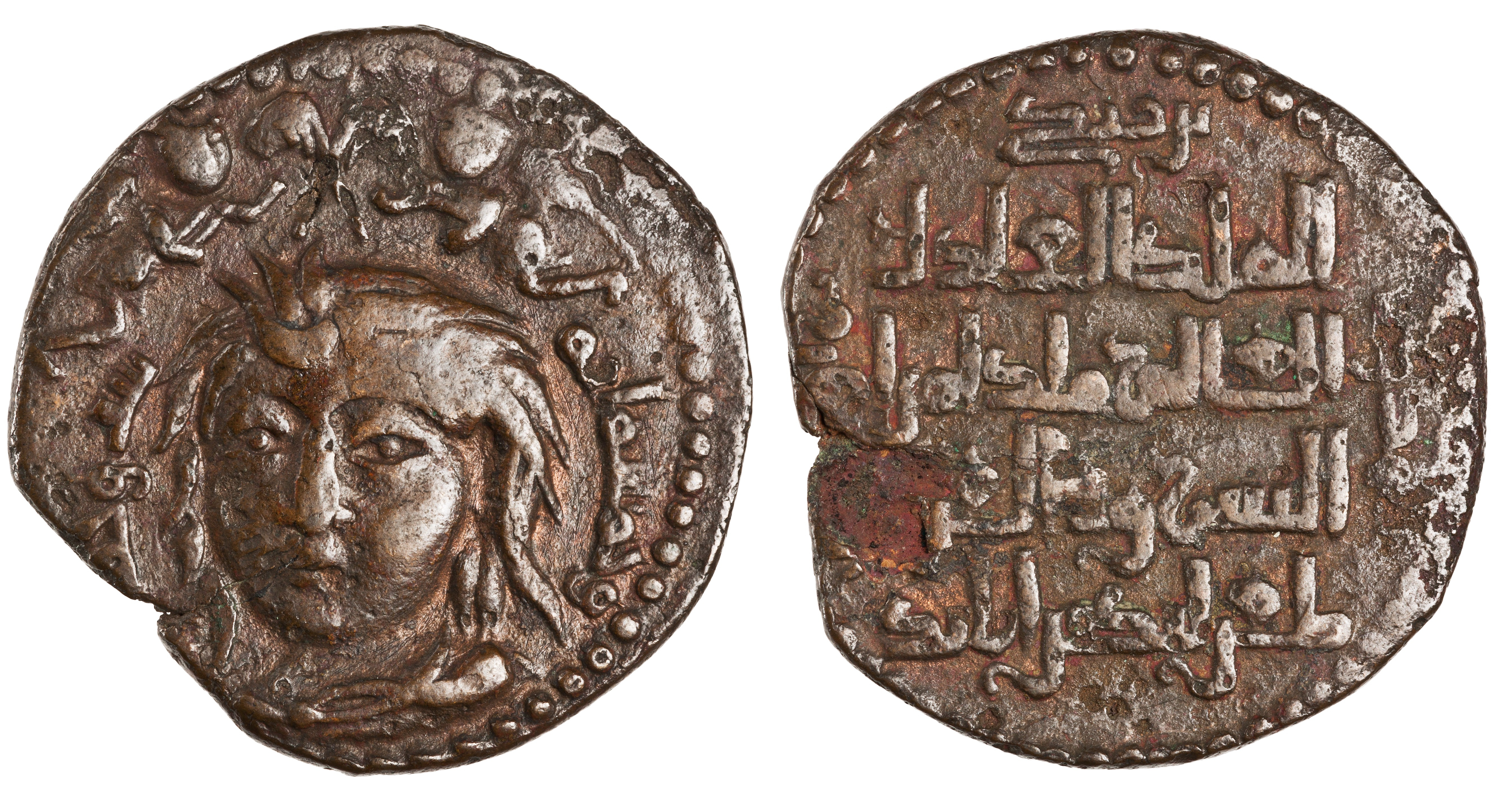
- Coinage of Qutb al Din Mawdud. 1149-1170. Dated AH 556 (1160-1161 CE). Facing male bust with two winged beings above (Sol in eclipse?); date around / Four line legend giving the laqab, or titles of Mawdud, and his ism and nasab, or genealogy back two generations.

Zengid Emir of Mosul
- Reign: 1149–1169
- Predecessor: Sayf al-Din Ghazi I
- Successor: Sayf al-Din Ghazi II
- Born: 1123
- Died: 6 September 1170 (aged 47)
- Issue: Sayf al-Din Ghazi II , Imad al-Din Zengi II
Names
- Qutb al-Din Mawdud ibn Imad al-Din Zengi
- House: Zengid Dynasty
- Father: Imad al-Din Zengi
- Religion: Sunni Islam

Qutb al-Din Mawdud (died 6 September 1170) was the Zengid Emir of Mosul from 1149 to 1169. He was the son of Imad al-Din Zengi and brother and successor of Sayf al-Din Ghazi I.

== Biography ==
At the death of Zengi, his possessions were divided between his sons: Nur al-Din received Aleppo and Saif al-Din Ghazi Mosul, while Qutb al-Din Mawdud received the emirate of Homs. After the death of Saif al-Din Ghazi in 1149, Qutb al-Din Mawdud was the first to arrive in Mosul and have himself recognized as emir; Nur al-Din, who desired to add the city to his lands, occupied Tal Afar and Sinjar, preparing to attack his brother and occupy Mosul. Only the intervention of veterans of the Aleppo army, who refused to take part in the fratricide war which would weaken the effort against the Crusaders and the Emirate of Damascus, forced Nur al-Din to renounce to the expedition and to reconcile with his brother.

Qutb al-Din Mawdud participated to the Siege of Baghdad (1157) in a coalition with the armies of the Seljuq Sultan Muhammad of Hamadan. It was the last Seljuq attempt to capture Baghdad from the Abbasids, but Caliph al-Muqtafi successfully defended his capital against the coalition.

During his reign in Mosul, Qutb held the Seljuq prince, Suleiman-Shah b. Muhammad b. Malik Shah, as a prisoner until 1160. In 1164, Shirkuh, a general of Nur al-Din, fought King Amalric I of Jerusalem for the control of Egypt. When he found himself in a weak situation, Nur al-Din launched an expedition against the Principality of Antioch to divert the Christian forces. The Artuqid emirs of Mardin and Diyarbakır, as well as Mawdud, joined him in the attack, which turned to be successful: the towns of Harim and Banias were captured, and Amalric had to abandon Egypt. For the same reason, Mawdud helped his brother in the County of Tripoli in 1167.

At the beginning of 1168, Kara Arslan, the Artuqid emir of Hasankeyf, died, and Qutb al-Din Mawdud tried to conquer that city; but he was pushed back by Nur al-Din, who had promised to defend Arslan's successors.

Qutb al-Din Mawdud died in September 1170. He had designed as successor his second son Sayf al-Din Ghazi II.

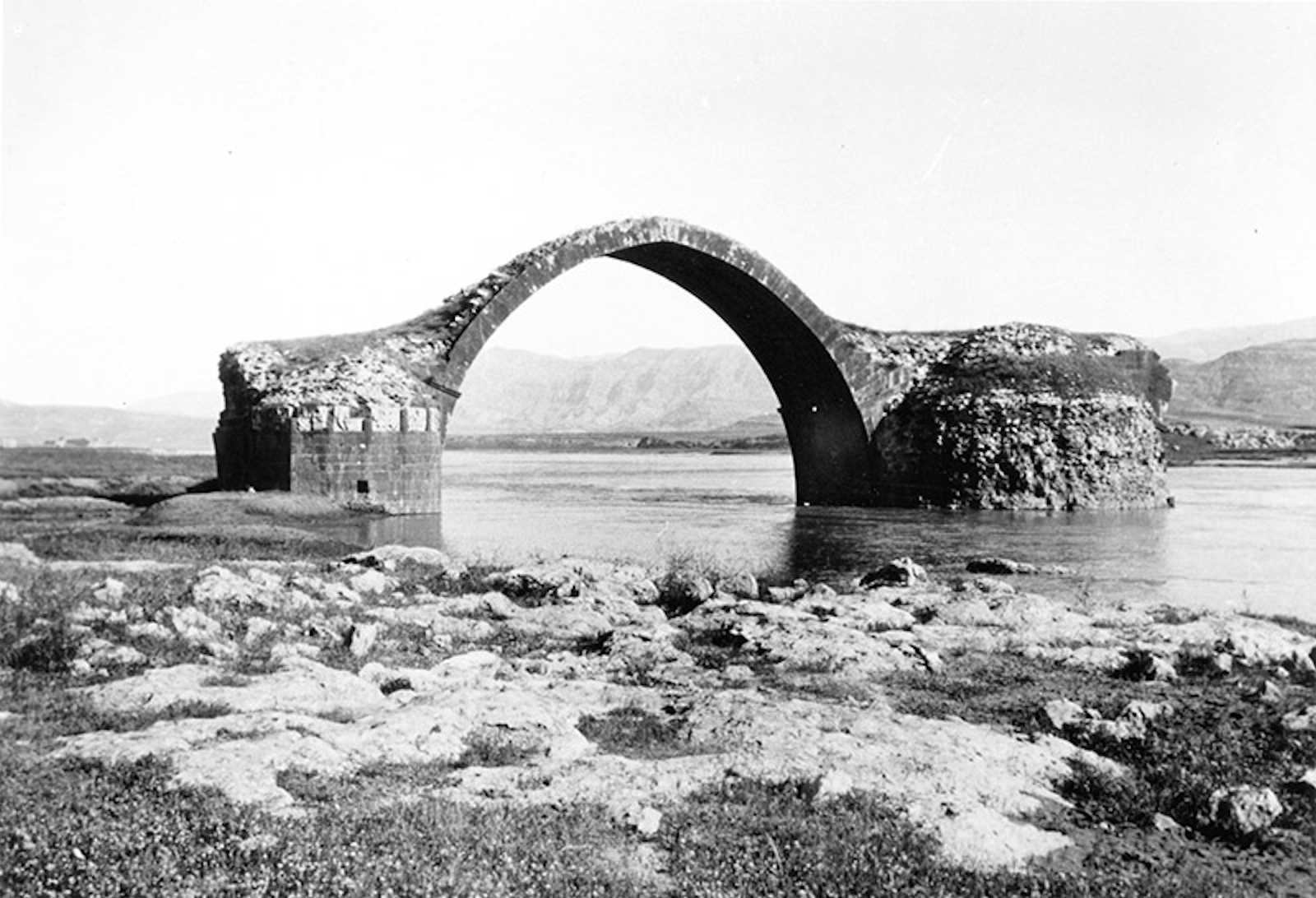
The Ain Diwar Bridge in Cizre was built under Qutb al-Din Mawdud.

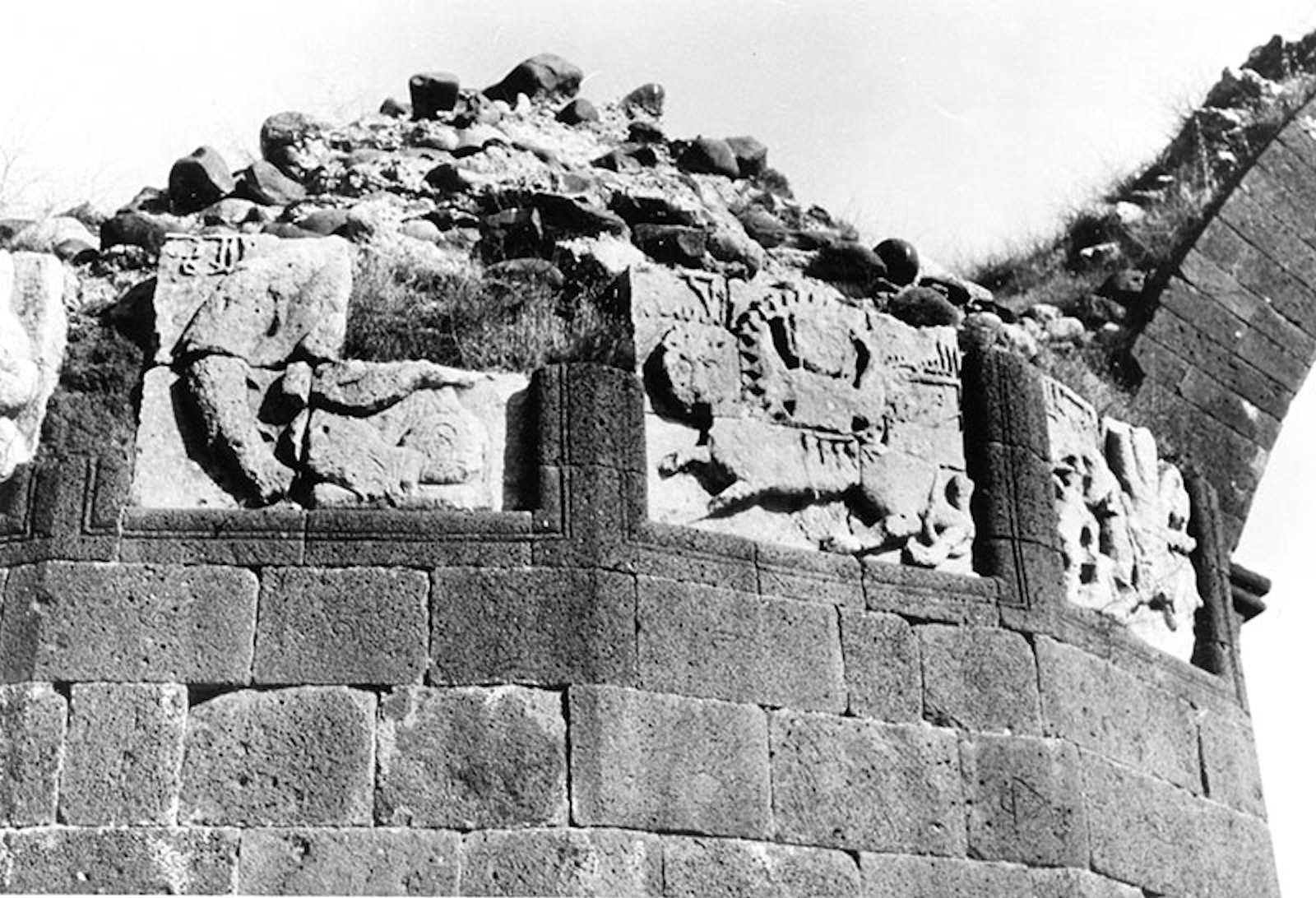
Reliefs of Zengid zodiacal signs.

== See also ==
- Zengid dynasty

== Sources ==
- Bosworth, C.E. (1996). The New Islamic Dynasties: A Chronological and Genealogical Manual. New York: Columbia University Press.
- Grousset, René (1935). Histoire des croisades et du royaume franc de Jérusalem - II. 1131-1187. L'équilibre.

Regnal titles
Preceded by Sayf al-Din Ghazi I	Emir of Mosul; 1149–1169	Succeeded by Sayf al-Din Ghazi II
