= Ismat ad-Din Khatun =

Wife of Saladin (died 1186)

Ismat ad-Din Khatun عصمت الدين
- Chief consort of Zengid Dynasty; Sultana of Ayyubid Dynasty
- Died: 1186
- Spouse: Nur ad-Din (until his death in 1174); Salah ad-Din (until her death in 1186)
Names
- Ismat ad-Din bint Mu'in ad-Din Unur
- Father: Mu'in ad-Din Unur

ʿIṣmat ad-Dīn Khātūn (Arabic: عصمت الدين خاتون; died 1186), also known as Asimat, was a Turkoman noblewoman and the daughter of Mu'in ad-Din Unur, regent of Damascus. She had been the wife of two of the greatest Muslim generals of the 12th century, Nur ad-Din and Saladin. She, who held considerable political influence in the period between Nur al-Din’s death and her marriage to Saladin, played a role in negotiations and mediation. Her marriage to Saladin helped legitimize his position as the undisputed ruler of Syria.

== Biography ==
Ismat ad-Din is a laqab (the descriptive part of an Arabic name) meaning "purity of the faith"; Khatun is an honorific meaning "lady" or "noblewoman”. Her given name (ism in Arabic) is unknown. Her father became regent of Damascus in 1138, and ruled the city on behalf of a series of young emirs of the Burid dynasty. During this time, Damascus' chief rivals to the north, Aleppo and Mosul, were united under the rule of the Zengid dynasty. Damascus had maintained an unsteady alliance with the Crusader Kingdom of Jerusalem, but in 1147, Mu'in ad-Din negotiated an alliance with the Zengid emir of Aleppo, Nur ad-Din, who had an engagement with Ismat ad-Din as part of the agreement. The next year, forces of Second Crusade conducted the unsuccessful Siege of Damascus, and Mu'in ad-Din was forced to recognize Nur ad-Din, who had come to his rescue against the crusaders, as overlord of the city.

Ismat ad-Din Khatun's father died in 1149 and her marriage with Nur ad-Din also happened that year when Nur ad-Din gained complete control over Damascus by 1154. However, the majority of sources claimed that Nur ad-Din and Ismat ad Din's marriage was never consummated as both of them never actually met with each other and the marriage was only a part of the agreement with Mu'in ad-Din. It is also noted by Ibn Athir and Asad al Asadi that Ismat ad-Din's marriage with Saladin was proclaimed as her first marriage publicly and her marriage with Nur ad-Din was not public until he died and Saladin married Ismat ad-Din to gain control over that territory. Nur ad-Din's wife Razi Khatun, who was the mother his daughters Shams un Nisa, Aqsa un Nisa (Saladin's wife) and a son named As-Salih, also denied anything that solidifies Ismat ad-Din's complete marriage with Nur ad-Din.

When Nur ad-Din died in 1174, King Amalric I of Jerusalem took advantage of the situation and besieged the city of Banias. Ismat offered him a bribe to lift the siege, but, hoping for a larger offer, Amalric continued the siege for two weeks, until finally accepting the money along with the release of twenty Christian prisoners. William of Tyre describes Ismat as having "courage beyond that of most women" in this matter. Nur ad-Din's former general Saladin had meanwhile gained control over Egypt, and claimed Damascus as his successor. He legitimized this claim by marrying Ismat at-Din in 1176. She was apparently not his only wife.

In 1186, she died of the plague epidemic that broke out in Damascus. Other sources states that she was suffering from Tuberculosis at the time which was proven fatal for her. However, by the time she died, Saladin was writing letters to her every day; as he was himself recovering from a lengthy illness at the time, news of her death was kept from him for three months.

In Damascus, she was the benefactor of numerous religious buildings, including a madrasa and a mausoleum for her father. She was buried in the Jamaa' al-Jadid in Damascus. She had no children with Nur ad-Din as their marriage was never consummated, but she also didn't have any children with Saladin or nothing was recorded about it in history. Most people claim Saladin's daughter Munisa'h Khatun to be Ismat's daughter. However, sources backing this fact are unclear.

== See also ==
- Women in Islam
- Women in Arab societies

== Sources ==
- Görgün, Hılal (2001). "İSMET HATUN". TDV Encyclopedia of Islam, Vol. 23 (İslâm – Kaade) (in Turkish). Istanbul: Presidency of Religious Affairs, Centre for Islamic Studies. p. 140. ISBN 978-975-389-450-0.
- Lyons, Malcolm Cameron; Jackson, D. E. P. (1982). Saladin: The Politics of the Holy War. Cambridge: Cambridge University Press. ISBN 0-521-31739-8.
