= Siege of Damascus (1148) =

Muslim victory of the Second Crusade

- Part of the Second Crusade
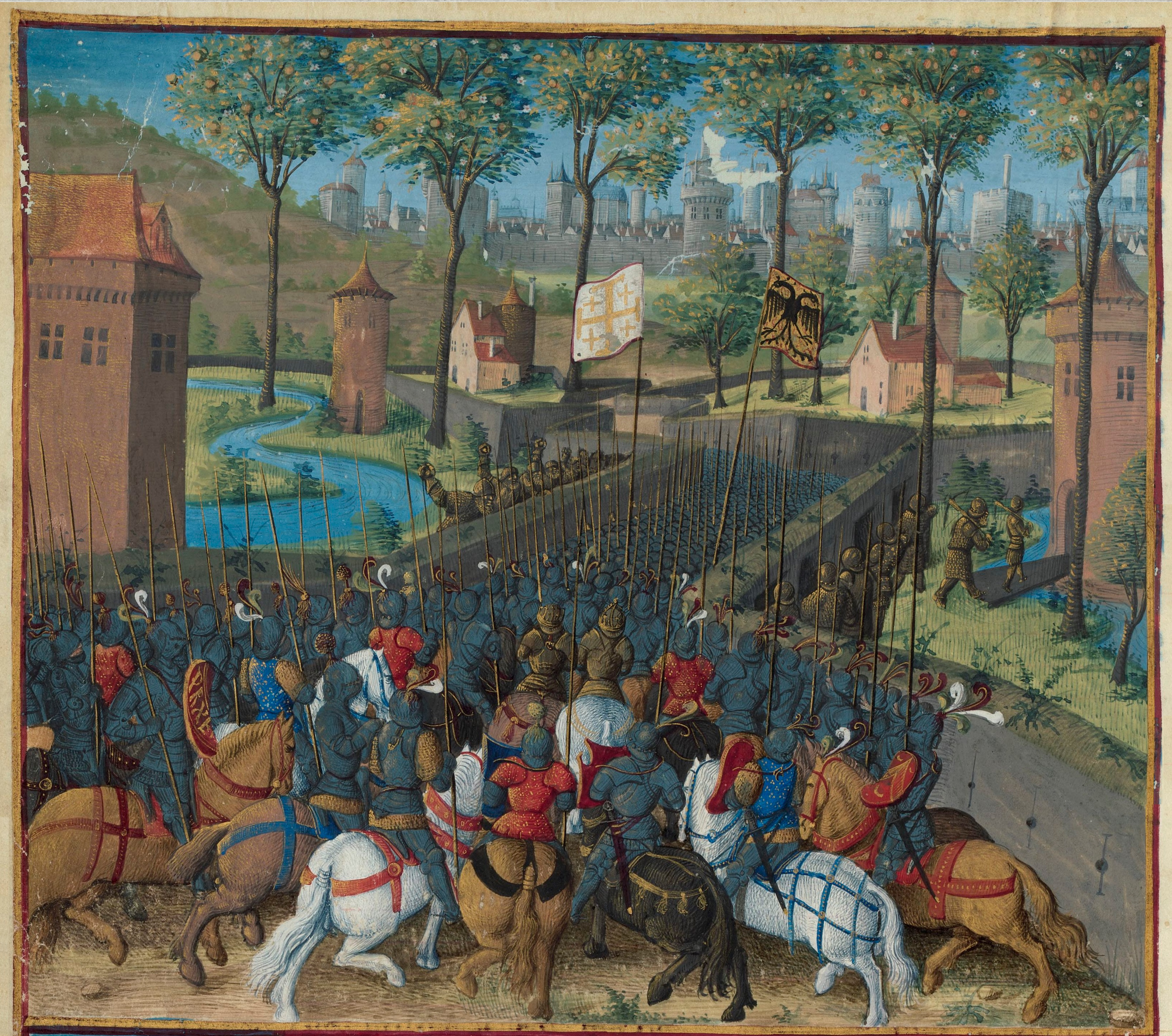
- Siege of Damascus, miniature by Jean Colombe from Sébastien Mamerot's book "Passages d'outremer" (1474)
Date	24–28 July 1148
Location	Damascus 33.5065°N 36.3154°E
Result	Muslim victory

Belligerents
Crusaders: Kingdom of Jerusalem; Holy Roman Empire; Kingdom of France; Knights Templar; Knights Hospitaller	Muslim forces: Burids; Supported by: Zengids

Commanders and leaders
Baldwin III; Conrad III; Louis VII	Mu'in ad-Din Unur Supported by: Sayf al-Din Ghazi I Nur al-Din Zengi

Strength
20,000 troops	Unknown

Casualties and losses
Heavy	Heavy

The siege of Damascus took place between 24 and 28 July 1148 O.S. during the Second Crusade. Two Crusader armies from Europe and the army of the Crusader Kingdom of Jerusalem attempted to lay siege to the Seljuk Empire city of Damascus. The effort ended in a Crusader defeat. The battle occurred as the alliance between the Kingdom of Jerusalem and Mu'in ad-Din Unur, emir of the city of Damascus, was unraveling and the Crusader County of Edessa was falling to Imad al-Din Zengi, emir of the Seljuk city of Aleppo.

Among the Christian armies from Western Europe which responded to the call for a crusade to retake Edessa were armies led Louis VII, King of France, and Conrad III, King of the Romans in the Holy Roman Empire. Both lost the majority of their forces crossing Anatolia.

In May 1148, Conrad met privately in Jerusalem with Baldwin III, King of Jerusalem, and Fulcher of Angoulême, Patriarch of Jerusalem. The decision was made to forego the attempt to retake Edessa, and attack Damascus instead. Fulcher convinced Louis to join in the endeavor, and the decision was ratified at the Council of Acre.

Damascus had extensive defenses, and was surrounded by densely planted orchards which made it difficult for an army to attack effectively.

The Crusaders approached Damascus from the south, but made the decision to shift westward. They attacked on 24 July through the Shahura Valley and entered the orchards at the village of Dārayyā. They encountered stiff Muslim resistance at the villages of Mezzeh and al-Rabweh, then crossed the Barada River. A portion of the Crusader force marched along the north bank of the river, while the majority of it stayed on the south side. The Crusaders pillaged the northern suburbs of Damascus on 25 July, but a Muslim counter-attack swept nearly all the Crusader forces from the north side of the river. This allowed large numbers of Muslim reinforcements to enter Damascus.

The main Crusader army began an attack on the city's western walls on 26 July, but a surprise Muslim counter-attack stopped it before it began. The Crusaders then became aware that two Muslim relief armies had gathered at Homs. Historians, medieval and modern, debate the reasons, but the Crusaders decided to move their camp from the west to the south side of the city on 27 July. This area was unconducive to supporting a siege, and the Crusaders abandoned the effort on 28 July.

The Crusader retreat was disorganized and Muslim archers harassed it, killing many of those on foot. The failure of the siege of Damascus severely damaged the relationship between the Crusader states and Western European leaders, swung the balance of power in the region to the Muslims, and contributed to Mu'in ad-Din Unur losing control of Damascus to a new emir, Nur al-Din Zengi.

== Background ==
The first hostile act between the Crusaders and the Burid rulers of Damascus was in form of raids in 1125, followed by the Battle of Marj al-Saffar in 1126, when the Crusaders defeated the Muslim army in the field but failed in their objective to capture Damascus. In 1129, they attacked Damascus again, when they camped near the Wooden Bridge (Jisr al-Khashab) at Dārayyā southwest of the city, but their siege of the city was unsuccessful after their foraging expedition south into the Hauran was defeated and they were unable to advance due to a sudden thunderstorm and ensuing fog. According to Michael the Syrian, who may have relied on the lost contemporary chronicle of Basil bar Shumna, Damascus paid 20,000 dinars and offered annual tribute in return for the crusaders' withdrawal. Damascus sent Turkomen raiders against the Crusader kingdom of the County of Tripoli in 1137, and the Kingdom of Jerusalem suffered a major defeat at Ba'arin trying to relieve the pressure on Tripoli.

In early 1138, the new ruler of Damascus, Mu'in ad-Din Unur, offered to ally with the Kingdom of Jerusalem against ambitious Turkic leader Imad al-Din Zengi, their common foe, but the proposal was turned down. After Zengi laid siege to Damascus in March 1140, Unur asked Fulk to assist again, offering to give him the city of Banias as well as monthly tribute. Fulk accepted, and in April 1140 forced Zengi to abandon the siege. A grateful Unur then visited Fulk's court in Jerusalem, where he was warmly welcomed.

In the spring of 1147, Altuntash, the emir of Bosra and Salkhad, fell out with Mu'in ad-Din Unur, to whom he owed allegiance. He offered these cities to Baldwin III, King of Jerusalem, and in return either asked for a huge payment or requested that he be set up as ruler over them (owing due allegiance to Jerusalem). Altuntash controlled the Hauran, an agricultural area which provided most of the food to the city of Damascus. (Note: The Kingdom of Jerusalem had routinely raided the Hauran for crops since 1100. In 1108, the Seljuks agreed to allow the Crusader kingdom and local peasants to take two-thirds of the region's output. This deal was replaced in 1109 dividing production equally, but the Damascenes re-established control over the Hauran in 1110 and the agreement collapsed.) Seizing the Hauran would pose a major threat to Muslim rule there, and the largely Melkite Christian population of the region would support a crusader invasion. A council of leading nobility in the Kingdom of Jerusalem agreed to accept the offer, even though it was "politically foolish" and would destroy the alliance between Damascus and Jerusalem.

The treaty with Damascus was vitally important, for Damascus protected the northern flank of the Kingdom of Jerusalem. The kingdom sent an embassy to Unur, who promised to pay all of Baldwin's expenses in raising the army which was about to leave for the Hauran. Baldwin agreed that violating the treaty was a bad idea, but he faced a popular uprising from the populace, who needed to pillage the Hauran in order to recoup the expenses of meeting the king's levy. Baldwin III marched with his army to capture Bosra. Unur called for and received assistance from Aleppo. The wife of Altuntash, still loyal to Unur, opened the gates of Bosra to a Damascene garrison, thwarting a takeover. Baldwin was forced to retreat without giving battle, and the withdrawal was made with extensive casualties under unrelenting attacks by Turkish light cavalry.

Baldwin's attack on Bosra ended the entente between Jerusalem and Damascus. Mu'in ad-Din Unur now sought to secure an alliance with Nur al-Din Zengi (Imad's son and the new emir of Aleppo). He took the first step by having his daughter, Ismat ad-Din Khatun, marry Zengi in 1147.

=== Second Crusade ===
Crusaders intended for Edessa, seen here on the right of this map (c.1140), were diverted by King Baldwin III of Jerusalem to Damascus.

The crusader kingdom of the County of Edessa fell to Imad al-Din Zengi, a Turkoman atabeg of the Seljuk Empire, on 24 December 1144. In response, Pope Eugene III in December 1145 called for a Second Crusade to retake the kingdom.

The two main Christian forces that marched to the Holy Land were led by Kings Louis VII of France and Conrad III of Germany. King Stephen of England did not participate in the second crusade due to internal conflicts, and King David I of Scotland was dissuaded by his subjects from joining the crusade himself. Conrad's army may have been 30,000 to 35,000 combatants at most. Contributors to Conrad's forces included Dukes Bolesław IV of Poland and Vladislaus II of Bohemia (who halted his march at Constantinople and subsequently returned), and Conrad's nephew, Frederick Barbarossa of Swabia. The size of the French army is more difficult to estimate, but was likely the size of the German force. (Note: These estimates do not include non-combatant support personnel.)

The crusaders marched across Europe and arrived at Constantinople in September and October 1147. Both Louis and Conrad faced disastrous marches across Anatolia in the months that followed. The Germans left Nicaea about 25 October O.S., headed for Antioch. Constantly harassed by mounted Turkish archers, infantry and support personnel suffered the most casualties and Conrad got about three days out of Dorylaeum before he turned back. Only about a tenth of his army remained.

The French chose a less direct route to Antioch. They stopped at the Crusader strongholds of Lopadium and Esseron before passing through Pergamon, Smyrna, and Ephesus. Conrad and his force joined them at Lopadium, but by the time the joint army reached Ephesus Conrad and most of his soldiers were too ill to continue. Byzantine Emperor Manuel I Komnenos sent ships to pick them up and bring them to Constantinople to recuperate. Using the valley of the Maeander River, Louis continued overland to the southeast, headed for the port of Adalia. Reaching Mount Cadmus, Geoffrey of Rancon led the vanguard up to summit. He moved so swiftly, he left the baggage train behind. Louis, in the rearguard, remained in camp, not intending to ascend until the next day. The Turks attacked the baggage train, which was only saved when Louis rushed to its rescue. Three-fourths of the French army was lost.

At Adalia, Louis preferred to have his knights travel overland to Antioch while the sick, injured, and those without funds to purchase provisions or steeds took passage to the duchy via ship. His nobles persuaded him to take ship, and have the rest proceed by land. Louis personally gave a large sum of money and most of his remaining horses to the overland group, putting Thierry, Count of Flanders and Archambaud VII, Duke of Bourbon in charge of the march.

After three days at sea, Louis reached the Principality of Antioch on 19 March 1148 O.S. Raymond of Poitiers was prince of the realm and uncle of Eleanor of Aquitaine, the French king's wife. Raymond wanted Louis to help him conquer Aleppo, Shaizar, and other nearby Muslim-held cities. (Note: Antioch had been under Byzantine control until 1084. It was one of the first cities taken by the First Crusade. The crusaders had earlier promised to return the city to the Byzantine emperor, but refused to do so. Raymond of Poitiers became king of Antioch by marriage to the child princess Constance of Antioch in 1136. The Byzantines besieged Antioch in 1137, and forced Raymond to submit. Raymond was permitted to hold the Principality of Antioch until such time as the Byzantines conquered Aleppo, Shaizar, Hama, and Homs. If they did so, Raymond would be forced to abandon Antioch for these cities. Raymond believed that if he conquered these cities without Byzantine support, the agreement of 1137 would be obviated. Additionally, Raymond had quarreled with Joscelin II of Edessa, and had little interest in recapturing the County of Edessa for him.) He discussed these ideas with Louis in private, and then presented his proposal to Louis before a joint meeting of Antiochene and French nobles in mid-May. Louis refused, wanting to go to Jerusalem as quickly as possible. He even refused to help Raymond upon his return north. (Note: The reasons for the French king's decision have confounded historians. William of Tyre said Louis wished to fulfill his crusader vow to visit Jerusalem, and historian Jonathan Phillips notes that Louis was almost certainly aware by now that Conrad III had landed at Acre. Louis may have wished to rush south to join up with the most senior king in Europe. But, Philips also points out that this did not require Louis to also refuse to help once he had done so. Phillips suggests the French army's manpower losses and a lack of funds to keep his army in the field mitigated against any agreement to help Raymond. Louis may also have learned that the city of Edessa had nearly been razed since the loss of the county and that nearly all the Christians in Edessa had been killed, leaving little to fight for, and that Louis had no desire to enrage Manuel I by helping Raymond.) Eleanor said she would seek an annulment of her marriage on grounds of consanguinity if Louis did not attack Aleppo. Rumors soon circulated that Eleanor was having an affair with her uncle. An outraged Louis had Eleanor placed under house arrest.

While in Constantinople, Conrad and Manuel agreed in principle to an alliance against Roger II, King of Sicily. Conrad's brother, Henry II, Duke of Austria, also promised to marry Manuel's niece, Theodora Komnene. Finally, Manuel gave Conrad funds to hire mercenary knights to help replenish his forces. Conrad left Constantinople on 7 March O.S. for Acre aboard a fleet of triremes loaned to him by Manuel. Delayed by storms, he arrived at Acre in early April. After celebrating Easter there on 11 April O.S., Conrad went to Jerusalem.

=== Council of Acre ===
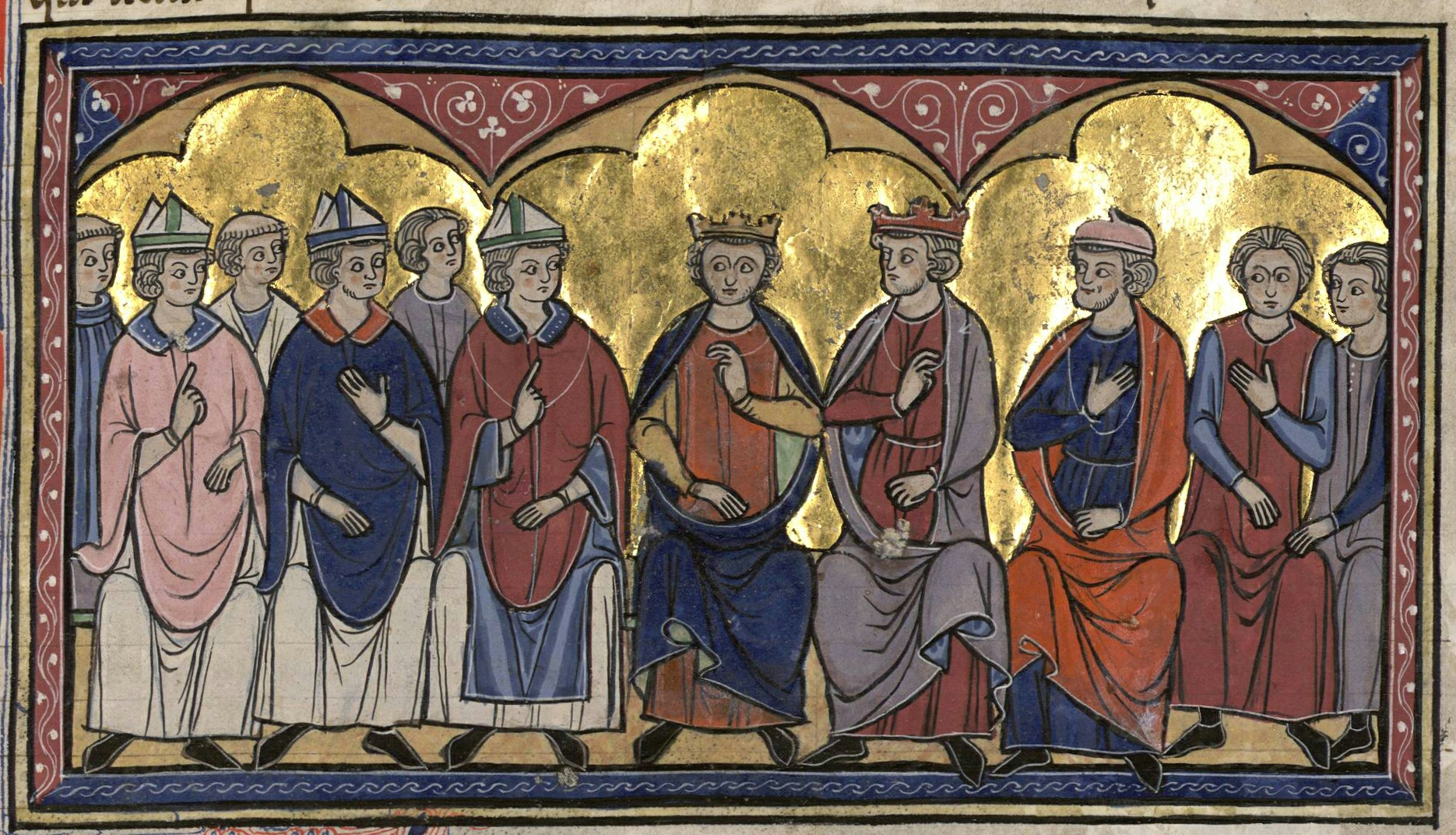
13th century depiction of the Council of Acre

In May 1148, a private meeting was held in Jerusalem in which Conrad, Baldwin III, Patriarch of Jerusalem Fulcher, and representatives from the Knights Templar attended. The group discussed possible targets for the crusaders, and settled on Damascus. Afterward, Fulcher was sent to Louis VII at Acre. Historian Hans Eberhard Mayer argues that Fulcher must have informed Louis about the decision reached in Jerusalem, and likely persuaded him that it was the right choice. (Note: Mayer reasons that Louis must have accepted the decision, which is why he marched with the remnant of his army to Jerusalem instead of attacking some other target.)

The kings and nobles of the French and German armies; the Queen Mother Melisende, King Baldwin III, and top nobility of the Kingdom of Jerusalem; the Catholic Church hierarchy of the Kingdom of Jerusalem; and the heads of the Knights Templar and Knights Hospitaller met in council at Palmarea near Acre on 24 June. "It was a meeting of the most important individuals yet to gather in the history of the Latin East. The presence of two senior crowned heads of the West, accompanied by many close members of their families, along with senior churchmen and nobles, was unprecedented." Although the choice of target had already been decided, this was a chance for Louis to make his opinions known publicly. There was much discussion, but little debate, and according to William of Tyre the decision to attack Damascus was made unanimously. William wrote that local Christians felt the city would fall after the first attack. According to medieval historian John of Salisbury, everyone believed that the city would fall within 15 days. (Note: Phillips points out that the Crusaders apparently brought little food and no siege engines with them. This, he says, indicates that the Crusaders believed the city would submit quickly. Morton, however, notes that the Crusaders almost never used siege engines when attacking inland cities.)

In July, the three kings and their armies assembled at Tiberias and marched to Damascus by way of Banias.

== Siege of Damascus ==
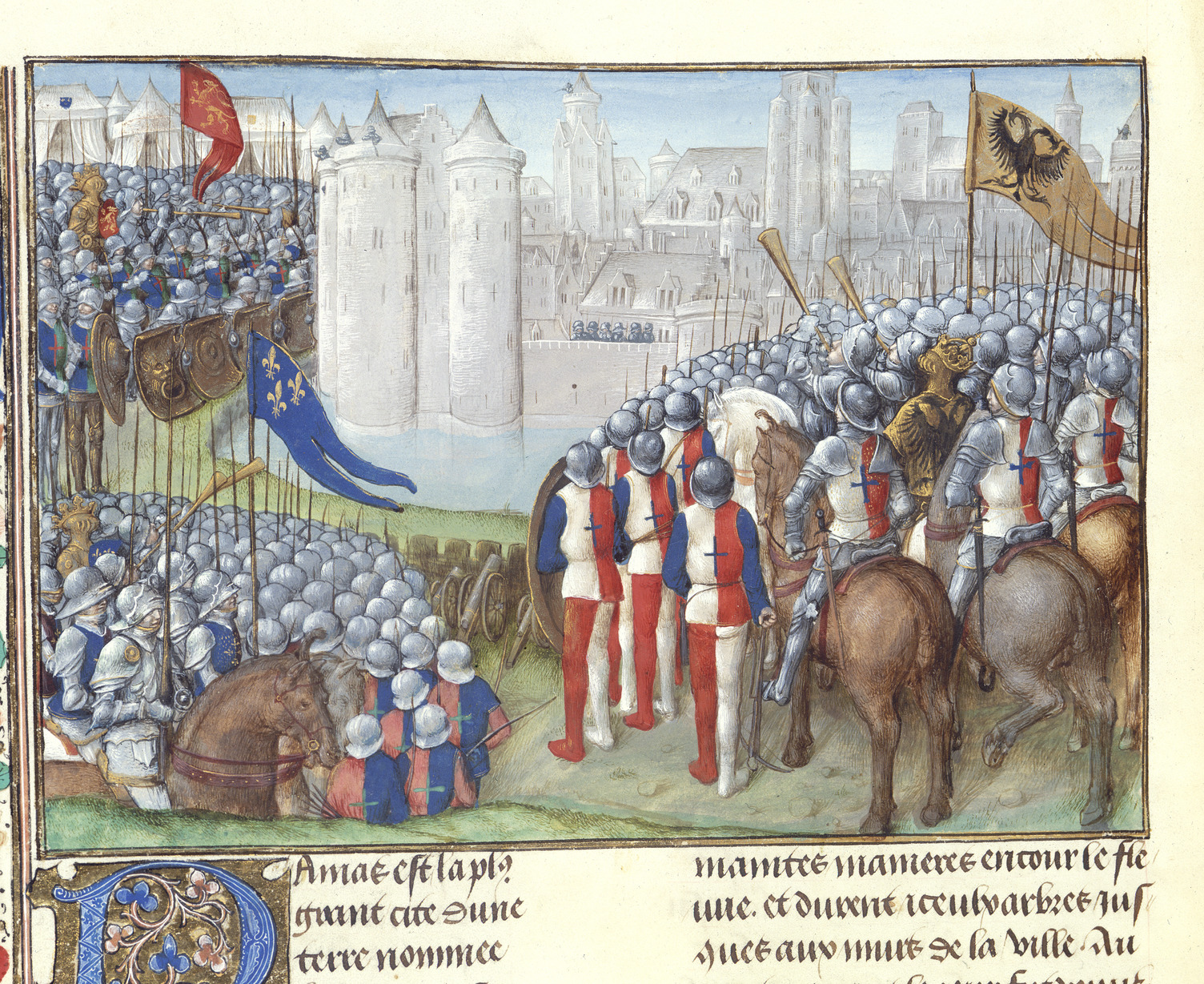
Crusaders besieging Damascus

Mu'in al-Din Unur learned of the Crusader decision to attack his city almost immediately. He sent messengers to other Muslim-held cities nearby, calling for aid. He also had engineers divert water sources along the road to Damascus, to make it more difficult for the Crusaders as they marched, and posted scouts along the road to warn him of the invading army's approach.

The Crusader army moved to Tiberias, a city on the western short of the Sea of Galilee, where for the first two weeks of July it waited for the Kingdom of Jerusalem's levies to arrive. Islamic historians claimed the Crusaders had 50,000 men, but modern historians believe this to be a gross exaggeration. (Note: Morton lists a number of problems regarding the use of the size of armies given in medieval sources, and advises extreme caution in using them. He notes that Fulcher of Angoulême, William of Tyre, and Walter the Chancellor of Antioch should be taken "with the utmost seriousness" when discussing Crusader armies, however. Even some early modern Western historians exaggerated the number of Crusader combatants. Thomas Keightley, for example, claimed 10,000 to 20,000 cavalry and 60,000 infantry.) More realistically, the Crusader army probably had 20,000 combatants, plus an unknown number of support personnel and hangers-on. (Note: Nicolle writes that Baldwin III could, at most, raise an army of 6,000 infantry and 550 knights. The Knights Templar probably contributed 130 knights. If Conrad had just 3,000 troops left and Louis 7,500, the combined total would have approached 17,500 combatants. An unknown number of mercenary combatants were raised by Conrad in Constantinople. In contrast, Morton puts the number of total Jerusalemite combatants Baldwin could raise at 4,000 to 8,000, which included 500 to 700 knights. To reach the 20,000 figure Morton cites, it seems Morton concludes that Baldwin raised closer to 8,000 combatants.) This made it the largest Crusader army fielded in two centuries.

The army marched north along the Jordan River, paused briefly at Banias, then crossed into Damascene territory while skirting the southern slopes of Mount Hermon. Islamic chroniclers say the army approached Damascus from the south, thinking to set up camp at Manazil al'Asakir. (Note: Near the modern town of Dārayyā.) But Unur had diverted the water supply away from that place, so the army moved to about 11 kilometres (6.8 mi) south to the village of Al-Kiswah and set up camp there on 23 July.

=== The defenses of Damascus ===
Densely planted, irrigated orchards extended up to 8 kilometres (5.0 mi) from the northern and western sides of medieval Damascus. Each plot was surrounded by a mud brick wall, and some plots even had towers. The only way through the orchards were via pathways which were only wide enough to accommodate a small cart. The orchards were a good defensive structure; the Crusader commanders believed that if they successfully penetrated the orchards, the defenders would be demoralized. The orchards would also supply food and water to the attacking army.

The apparent consensus at the Council of Acre was that the Damascene defenses were not particularly strong, but they were much more formidable than the Crusaders knew.

The medieval city of Damascus was surrounded by "very thick" curtain walls built early in the city's Romano-Byzantine period and made of stone. The walls had fallen into disrepair or been damaged several times, (Note: The walls fell into disrepair after the collapse of the Umayyad Caliphate in 750 C.E., but its successor, the Abbasid Caliphate, repaired them some time in the 800s. The walls were again repaired about 918 C.E. when an army of the Fatimid Caliphate threatened the city. The Fatamids took control in 920 C.E., and the occupiers made several breaches in the walls so they could more easily control the restive population. Sometime early in the period of Fatimid rule, the walls were damaged by fire. Several sections were repaired with mud brick in the 900s. An earthquake struck the city in June 1140 and damaged some portion of the walls. The emir used discarded and broken stone ("spoila") to repair them.) and at the time of the Second Crusade the entire northern wall and the northern portion of the western wall were still made completely of stone. In some places, the outer wall had been repaired with mud brick. The Crusaders believed mud brick was easily breached, although well-made mud brick and well-built mud brick walls were nearly as strong as stone. Unur likely strengthened the walls and citadel after the Kingdom of Jerusalem's attack on the city of Bosra in 1147.

The city walls had a number of Roman-built stone towers. In the western wall, there was a horseshoe-shaped tower in the north and a rectangular tower in the middle. The city's southern gate, Bab al-Saghir, was flanked by two horseshoe-shaped towers, and a rectangular tower stood near the southwestern gate of Bab Kisan. Where Roman towers had collapsed, the Fatamids erected some roughly-built semi-circular towers in their place. All of the walls were surmounted with crenellations, which probably could be sealed with mantlets. Defenders atop the walls were almost always armed with the bow or crossbow, and often used the jarrād (a short, dart-like arrow that could pierce armor) in addition to the arrow and flaming arrow. Some defenders were also armed with the mangonel, a portable, human-powered trebuchet.

Some time in the 900s, the city's rulers erected a citadel in the northeast corner of the city. (Note: Archeological dating of the first citadel is in flux. The citadel may date from 11th century Seljuk rule.) It was simple in construction, but had a number of towers. (Note: The citadel now visible in the city of Damascus did not exist during the Second Crusade.)

The forces defending the city were primarily made up of amateur local militia (aḥdāth), with smaller numbers of professional Damascene soldiers ('askar), Turkish mercenaries, and minimally armed volunteers from nearby villages (mutatawiy'a). (Note: Nicolle provides descriptions of the aḥdāth, 'askar, and mutatawiy'a.) Most medieval Christian and Muslim commentators suggest the Damascene forces numbered between 2,000 and 5,000.

=== 24 July ===
The three kings and the siege, from a 13th-century manuscript

The Kingdom of Jerusalem's forces were in the vanguard of the Crusader army, led by Baldwin III. Behind them, acting as reinforcements, were the French led by Louis VII. The rearguard consisted of Conrad III and the small German force. The army marched north and then northwest from al-Kiswah, rounding the low mountains of Jabal al-Mani' and Jabal al-Aswad, then shifted westward to access the Shahura Valley. They followed it northwest, entered the orchards at the village of Dārayyā, and then turned north. The defenders acted like guerrillas, attacking with arrows and lances from behind the walls, from the towers, and from the trees. At the village of Mezzeh, (Note: Mezzeh is about 2 kilometres (1.2 mi) south of the Barada River and 3.8 kilometres (2.4 mi) west-northwest of the medieval city's walls.) Damascene soldiers and aḥdāth, as well as some Turkish mercenaries, fought fiercely to stop the Crusaders but were unable to stop them.

The attackers continued north past Mezzeh toward the Barada River and the village of al-Rabweh. (Note: Al-Rabweh is about 2 kilometres (1.2 mi) west of medieval Damascus.) At the river, aḥdāth, ghuzāt (religiously-motivated warriors), ordinary citizens, and a small number of 'askar attempted to halt the Crusader army's progress again. Mounted Turkish archers struck the attackers hard, and the Damascene soldiers did much damage using small, mobile ballistae. The Crusader advance bogged down. William of Tyre claimed that Conrad III became so incensed that he and some of his knights charged through the Crusader lines, dismounted, and broke the Damascene resistance. (Note: William of Tyre was unable to explain how Conrad was able to plunge through both the French and Jerusalemite lines to reach the front without disrupting the attacking forces.) There were heavy losses on both sides.

A portion of the Crusader force now crossed the Barada River, (Note: Keightley says these consisted of the forces of Louis and Conrad.) while the majority of troops remained on the south bank. Both parts of the Crusader army moved east, and soon passed out of the orchards into a relatively open area west of the city. The troops on the north bank made camp for the night north of the city. The remainder of the army camped opposite the Bab al-Jabiya gate in the western wall of Damascus. In both places, the attackers made defensive palisades out of orchard trees they had cut down.

The Damascenes barricaded the major streets, preparing for the assault. The interior gates of the city were also closed, sealing each quarter off from the others. The small Bab al-Jinan gate at the southeast corner of the citadel was walled up.

=== 25 July ===
Early on Sunday, 25 July, the main Crusader force south of the Barada River moved its camp (but not its troops) away from the Bab al-Jabiya to the Maydan al-Akhdar ("Green Maydan"), a grassy cavalry training ground about 1 kilometre (0.62 mi) west of the citadel. (Note: The Maydan al-Akhdar was located on the south bank of the Barada River. The Qasr al-Ablaq palace was later built one the site, It is now the site of the Sulaymaniyya Takiyya. It was also known as Maydan al-Marj ("Maydan Meadow") or Maydan al-Qasr ("Maydan of the Citadel"), and as the "Green Hippodrome". Baldwin II of Jerusalem had used it as a base during his attack on Damascus in 1129, and Al-Afdal ibn Salah ad-Din would do so again in 1199.) The move was apparently prompted by fear of disease, as many Crusader knights had come down with diarrhea after eating heavily of the fruit in the orchards. Throughout the day on 25 July, Muslim guerrillas attacked the Crusaders in front of the gate.

North of the city, the Barada River and a small canal, the Nahr 'Aqrabani, ran along the northern city wall, and well-guarded bridges were needed to access the city gates here, preventing an immediate frontal attack, so the Crusaders pillaged and destroyed the agricultural area outside the al-Faradis Gate. (Note: The al-Faradis gate ("Paradise Gate") drew its name from this area, which was heavily planted with olive and walnut trees and numerous vegetable and fruit vines. There was also a large cemetery there (now part of the Dahdāh cemetery), and a number of flour and paper mills along the river. The Crusaders may have briefly raided further east along the north wall, but apparently never went past the northeast corner of the city.) This force also blocked the road leading north, to prevent reinforcements from the reaching the city from that direction.

Unur ordered a major attack on the smaller Crusader force north of the city. Muslim forces surged out of the northern gates of the city and the surprised Crusaders fell back 2 kilometres (1.2 mi) west toward al-Rabweh. A full scale battle now occurred at the mouth of the Rabwa Gorge. (Note: Nicolle identifies the site as between Umayyad Square and the Nahr Tawra canal (aka Tora River).) The Damascene forces took heavy losses, including the 71-year-old Maliki legal scholar Abu al-Hajjaj al-Fandlawi (also known as Yusuf ibn Dunas ibn Isa), the Sufi mystic Abd ar-Rahman al-Halhuli, and the elder brother of Saladin, Nur ad-Din Shahanshah. (Note: According to Nicolle, the deaths of al-Fandlawi and al-Halhuli occurred in the Bustan al-Sha'bani ("Field of the Sha'bani"). This puts that part of the battle in what is now the Al-Salihiyah neighborhood, 1.75 kilometres (1.09 mi) northeast of the final battle and 2.25 kilometres (1.40 mi) northwest of the city's citadel, indicating that the fighting took place over a very wide area.) The fighting raged all day. The Crusaders never regrouped during the attack, and were unable to mount one of their highly effective charges. Despite heavy losses, the Muslims prevailed and cleared the north bank of the Barada of all Crusaders. (Note: Muslim scholar Abu al-Hakam al-Kirmani, living in Zaragoza, Spain, wrote shortly after the event that about 70 Damascene defenders lost their lives, along with 200 Crusaders and a number of their horses. Modern historian David Nicolle says his numbers are likely correct.)

The defenders received reinforcements throughout the day on 25 July, mostly archers from the Beqaa Valley of Lebanon. (Note: Much of what is now southern Lebanon was an ally or feudal subordinate of Damascus.) (Note: The archers used the Lebanon Road, which followed the Rabwa Gorge. But, according to al-Qalānisi, these archers arrived through the eastern gate, Bab Sharqi.) The relief forces effectively doubled the size of the city's defensive manpower.

=== 26 July ===
The main Crusader force south of the Barada River formed up on the morning of 26 July to attack the Bab al-Jabiyah gate. Rather than defend the city from atop the walls, the Damascenes now assembled outside the walls. The Muslims struck first, apparently surprising the pickets. The Muslim historian Abū Shāma wrote that the Crusaders barely defended themselves, and that a large number of Crusader soldiers were beheaded.

26 July saw even more reinforcements pour into the city. These were largely volunteers from surrounding villages, although they did include a number of mounted Turkomen archers, Turkish militia, and more archers from the Beqaa Valley. The peasant volunteers were well-drilled and seasoned militia, as their villages had to fight off Bedouin raids for several centuries, and there was an extensive history of mutual military support between the city and villagers. (Note: Many of the local militia were likely archers.)

=== 27 July ===
By 27 July, Sayf al-Din Ghazi I, emir of Mosul, and Nur al-Din Zengi, emir of Aleppo, had arrived at the Syrian city of Homs with two relief armies. (Note: Muslim historian Ibn al-Athir, writing a century after the Second Crusade, implies that the two relief armies reached Homs on 24 July.) Homs was 150 kilometres (93 mi) north of Damascus by road, a five day march. According to historian David Nicolle, it is "certain" that, before their arrival, the emirs sent a fast messenger to the Crusaders at Damascus telling them to leave or they would be destroyed.

This messenger almost certainly arrived on 26 July, for late in the evening of 26 July, overnight, or perhaps early in the morning of 27 July, Louis VII sent Godefroy de la Roche Vanneau, Bishop of Langres and a respected military leader, to reconnoiter the southern and southeastern walls of the city with the intent of finding a new place to encamp the army. Langres reported the area lacked pasture (although he may have said that it lacked water), (Note: The Levant was suffering from extremely poor rains in 1148, and food supplies that year were scarce all over the Middle East.) and this was clearly a much poorer site from which to conduct a siege.

William of Tyre and other European medieval historians believed that Unur bribed several Jerusalemite barons to sabotage the siege, and they persuaded Baldwin, Louis, and Conrad to move to this less desirable position. (Note: William of Tyre believed the Crusaders could not agree on who would govern the city if they captured it. Guy I Brisebarre, Lord of Beirut, was the suggestion of the barons of the Kingdom of Jerusalem, but Thierry of Alsace wanted it for himself and was supported by Baldwin, Louis, and Conrad. William believed that the Jerusalemite barons would rather have seen the siege collapse than see it in the hand of Thierry of Alsace. Conrad III also expressed this belief.) Medieval historians such as Ralph of Coggeshall, John of Salisbury, the "annalist of Würzburg", and Michael the Syrian also accused the Knights Templar of taking bribes. (Note: Morton says this is likely because the Templars had expressed reservations regarding the campaign at the Council of Acre.) (Note: The anonymous "annalist of Würzburg" wrote the Annales Herbipolenses, a highly critical, three-part chronicle of the Second Crusade. It was written as reports reached the German city of Würzburg.) He also justified the move by claiming that Langres told the three kings that the wall here was low and made of easily breached unbaked mud brick.

Most modern historians believe, as David Nicolle put it, that accusations of bribery are "nonsense". (Note: Medieval claims about bribery are often embellished with the claim that the money turned out to be counterfeit.) It is far more likely that the loss of the northern bank of the Barada River (which exposed the Maydan al-Akhdar to attack) and the news that relief armies were soon to arrive led to the decision. (Note: Relief forces coming down the Lebanon Road, or from Homs, could have pinned the Crusaders against the Damascus city walls. The southern and southeastern sides of the city offered easier escape.)

Historian Nicholas Morton, however, says it is likely that Baldwin III took a bribe. (Note: Modern historian John Phillips calls this "possible".) Baldwin III knew full well that attacking from the south or southeast was a poor decision, as his father, Baldwin II, had tried to besiege Damascus from that point and failed due to the lack of forage and water. Yet, nothing in the record suggests that Baldwin warned Louis or Conrad against moving the camp. Morton says that Baldwin knew the campaign was doomed to fail because Unur's allies could provide support too quickly and the Crusader army was too small to control a city of 40,000 people. It wasn't treachery, but pragmatism which motivated Baldwin: Only a large bribe could compensate for the expenditure of troops and treasure which the doomed campaign had incurred.

Morton concludes that once Baldwin realized relief forces were on their way, he had to devise a way to convince Louis and Conrad to give up the siege. Moving the camp to the southeast, he says, was Baldwin's way of forcing Conrad into accepting the inevitability of failure.

Whatever the reason, the Crusader army decided to abandon the Maydan al-Akhdar on 27 July and move to an area in front of the city's southeast gate, the Bab Kisan. (Note: After the Crusaders moved, the Muslim defenders blocked off the Bab al-Jabiya using rock and timber.)

As the Crusaders broke camp, a Catholic priest decided he would inspire the troops by demonstrating before the city. Wearing several crucifixes and riding a donkey, he led several other priests, pilgrims, and soldiers on a procession in front of the citadel and its gate. According to the Arab historian Sibt ibn al-Jawzi, writing in the early 1200s C.E., the Damascenes opened the gates and a group of aḥdāth rushed out. One man beheaded the priest and then killed his donkey.

Unur, too, learned about the relief armies at Homs on 27 July. He also received intelligence that there was emerging dissent among the Crusader leadership regarding the viability of the siege.

=== 28 July ===
The city's southern and southeastern defenses were actually quite strong. In addition to the well-maintained, extremely sturdy mud brick wall and gate protected by towers, there was a dry moat and a palisade.

On the morning of 28 July, the Crusaders began changing camps again. Historian Ibn Asakir says they had moved only as far as the southwestern suburb of Qayniyya (probably the modern Al Souweqah neighborhood of Damascus) when the decision was made to abandon the siege. (Note: Elsewhere, Nicolle describes this as the Crusaders having "started their move, then realized it could not succeed and so did little more than pause before abandoning the siege altogether.") Phillips says that, according to John of Salisbury, the decision to retreat was made before the decision to move the camp, because Conrad III wanted to go back to Jerusalem and get more supplies and soldiers and then return. No serious attempt to attack the southern or southeast walls was made.

The morning of 28 July, the first Crusader units left the battlefield to retreat toward Jerusalem, although most of the army did not flee until 29 July. There was dissent among the troops about the decision to leave, as it was being done so in a humiliating way without having given battle.

== Aftermath ==
=== The retreat ===
Although the initial stage of the retreat on 28 July was done in good order, the rest of the army did so in an increasingly haphazard way on 29 July. There was apparently no rearguard to protect the Crusaders as they retreated, and Abū Shāma says Muslim archers killed large numbers of both men and animals. (Note: William of Tyre admitted the Crusaders retreated in "fear and confusion", but likely lied when he said the Crusaders returned home without incident.) Most of those who died were on foot, such as the pilgrims and infantry. The Crusaders likely held the crossing at al-Rabweh until the end. They destroyed the village when they left, although the actual date of its destruction cannot be pinpointed. (Note: Al-Rabweh may have been evacuated as early as 27 July, when the main Crusader camp left Maydan al-Akhdar, or as late as 29 July.)

The Crusaders looted extensively on their way back to Jerusalem, even though they were constantly harassed by Muslim archers as far as Banias.

=== Effects on the Crusader states ===
According to Conrad, the Council of Acre had agreed to attack Ascalon if the siege of Damascus failed. He left Jerusalem and went to Ascalon, but no local Christian barons joined him and he returned to Jerusalem after eight days. Conrad eventually went to Acre, and in disgust set sail for Constantinople on 8 September 1148 O.S.

Most of the French nobles went back to Europe in 1148. Louis remained in Palestine until late April 1149, making pilgrimages to various holy sites.

Each of the Christian commanders felt betrayed by the others. The ignominious siege of Damascus sowed deep distrust between the western European Christian powers and the Crusader kingdoms, as well as between European rulers. The rift between Conrad and Baldwin was so bad, Baldwin did not ask him for help in 1149. Pope Eugenius was deeply troubled by the defeat, and only weakly supported additional support for Jerusalem and Antioch in 1149. Morale collapsed among Western European rulers and potential pilgrims and settlers, and the cost of the Second Crusade meant there was little money available for military assistance in the immediate future. Christians who had been induced to settle in the Crusader states felt their leaders had betrayed them, and support for the rulers of Crusader states dropped.

Bernard of Clairvaux sought to avoid responsibility for the failure of the crusade by blaming sinful Christian commanders and the inscrutable judgments of God. (Note: In blaming Baldwin and the local barons, Conrad, too, attempted to shift the blame.) He attempted to call a new crusade in 1150, but this effort failed. He also asked the pope to institute reform in the Roman Catholic Church as a way of avoiding defeat in future crusades.

In the longer term, the defeat aided Nur al-Din Zengi militarily. The balance of power swung strongly toward the Muslims as fear of the Crusader armies vanished. Zengi invaded the Principality of Antioch in late 1148, and in June 1149 Raymond of Antioch was killed at the Battle of Inab. There was so little support in Europe for aiding the Crusader states that nothing was done when the remnants of the County of Edessa were sold off in 1150, or when King Amalric of Jerusalem put his kingdom under Byzantine control in 1171. Although several small military expeditions were made to the Middle East, it was not until Saladin captured Jerusalem in 1187 that a third crusade would occur.

Zengi also expanded his rule to include Damascus. Arguing that he was the saviour of Damascus, there was a significant likelihood that the populace might open the city of Damascus to Zengi and overthrow Mu'in ad-Din Unur and the ruling Burid dynasty. Unur signed an armistice with the Kingdom of Jerusalem in 1149, and the following year agreed to pay tribute to the Crusader kingdom. Zengi advanced on Damascus anyway. Fortuitous weather (seen as a good omen by the populace) and accusations of an alliance with "infidel unbelievers" forced Unur to acknowledge Zengi has the city's overlord in May 1150. After repeated clashes and threats, Damascus was captured militarily by Zengi in 1154.

== Bibliography ==
- al-Qalānisi, Ibn (1932). Gibb, H.A.R. (ed.). The Damascus Chronicle of the Crusades: Extracted and Translated From the Chronicle of Ibn al-Qalānisi. London: Luzac & Co.
- Baldwin, Marshall W. (1969) [1955]. "The Latin States under Baldwin III and Amalric I, 1143–1174; The Decline and Fall of Jerusalem, 1174–1189". In Setton, Kenneth M.; Baldwin, Marshall W. (eds.). A History of the Crusades, Volume I: The First Hundred Years. Vol. 1 (Second ed.). Madison, Milwaukee, and London: University of Wisconsin Press. pp. 528–561, 590–621. ISBN 0-299-04834-9.
- Barber, Malcolm (2012). The Crusader States. New Haven, Conn.: Yale University Press. ISBN 9780300113129.
- Beck, Hans-Georg; Fink, Karl August; Glazik, Josef; Iserloh, Erwin; Wolter, Hans (1980). Jedin, Hubert; Dolan, John (eds.). Handbook of Church History. Volume IV: From The High Middle Ages to the Eve of the Reformation. Translated by Biggs, Anselm. London: Burns & Oates. ISBN 9780824503147.
- Brundage, James (1962). The Crusades: A Documentary Survey. Milwaukee, Wisc.: Marquette University Press. hdl:2027/mdp.39015007046967. OCLC 695561637.
- Burns, Ross (2007). Damascus: A History. Routledge. ISBN 978-1-134-488490.
- Carey, Brian Todd; Allfree, Joshua B.; Cairns, John (2022). Warfare in the Age of Crusades: The Latin East. Barnsley, South Yorkshire, UK: Pen & Sword Military. ISBN 9781526730213.
- Claster, Jill (2009). Sacred Violence: The European Crusades to the Middle East, 1095-1396. Toronto: University of Toronto Press. ISBN 9781442600584.
- Cowan, Ian Borthwick; Mackay, P. H. R.; Macquarrie, Alan (1983). The Knights of St John of Jerusalem in Scotland. Vol. 19. Scottish History Society. ISBN 978-0906245033.
- Davies, Norman (2008). The Isles: A History. Pan Macmillan. ISBN 978-0330475709.
- El-Azhari, Taef (2016). Zengi and the Muslim Response to the Crusades. London: Routledge. ISBN 9781138821019.
- Hoch, Martin (2002). "The Price of Failure: The Second Crusade as a Turning Point in the History of the Latin East". In Hoch, Martin; Phillips, Jonathan (eds.). The Second Crusade: Scope and Consequences. Manchester University Press. ISBN 978-0719057113.
- Keightley, Thomas (1834). The Crusaders: Or, Scenes, Events, and Characters, From the Times of the Crusades. London: J.W. Parker. OCLC 11600202.
- Mayer, Hans Eberhard (1972). "Studies in the History of Queen Melisende of Jerusalem" (PDF). Dumbarton Oaks Papers. 26: 93–182. doi:10.2307/1291317. JSTOR 1291317.
- McGuire, Brian Patrick (2020). Bernard of Clairvaux: An Inner Life. Ithaca, N.Y.: Cornell University Press. ISBN 9781501751042.
- Michaud, Joseph Francois (1900). The History of the Crusades, Volume I. Translated by Robson, W. New York: A.C. Armstrong & Son. OCLC 1152328188.
- Morton, Nicholas (2020). The Crusader States and Their Neighbours: A Military History, 1099-1187. Oxford, UK: Oxford University Press. ISBN 9780198824541.
- Nicolle, David (2009). The Second Crusade, 1148: Disaster Outside Damascus. London: Osprey. ISBN 9781846033544.
- Nicolle, David (2026). "The Second Crusade's Siege of Damascus and the Ruin of al-Faradis". In Banister, Mustafa; Ragheb, Fadi (eds.). From Cairo to Jerusalem and Beyond: Studies of the Later Islamic Middle Period in Honor of Linda Stevens Northrup. Leiden: Brill. ISBN 9789004742567.
- Phillips, Jonathan (1994). "Hugh of Payns and the 1129 Damascus Crusade". In Malcolm Barber (ed.). The Military Orders: Fighting for the Faith and Caring for the Sick. Variorum.
- Phillips, Jonathan (2007). The Second Crusade: Extending the Frontiers of Christianity. New Haven, Conn.: Yale University Press. ISBN 9780300112740.
- Richard, Jean (1999). The Crusades, c. 1071–c. 1291. Cambridge University Press. ISBN 978-0521625661.
- Riley-Smith, Jonathan (1991). Atlas of the Crusades. New York: Facts on File. ISBN 978-0816021864.
- Runciman, Steven (1952). A History of the Crusades, Volume II: The Kingdom of Jerusalem and the Frankish East. Cambridge: Cambridge University Press.
- Schmieder, Felicitas; O'Doherty, Marianne (2015). Travels and Mobilities in the Middle Ages: From the Atlantic to the Black Sea. Vol. 21. Turnhout, Belgium: Brepols Publishers. ISBN 978-2-503-55449-5.
- Smail, R.C. (1956). Crusading Warfare, 1097–1193. Cambridge, UK: Cambridge University Press. OCLC 242573.
- Tyerman, Christopher (2019). The World of the Crusades: An Illustrated History. New Haven, Conn.: Yale University Press. ISBN 9780300217391.
- William of Tyre (1943). Evans, Austin P. (ed.). A History of Deeds Done Beyond the Sea. Volume 1. Translated by Babcock, Emily Atwater; Krey, August C. New York: Columbia University Press. OCLC 1293984682.
