= Gümüshtekin =

Governor of Aleppo (died 1177)

Gümüshtekin, also known as Gumushtekin (died September 1177), was a eunuch who held high offices in the Zengids' empire. Nur ad-Din, atabeg of Aleppo, appointed him to be his lieutenant in Mosul in Iraq. After Nur ad-Din died in 1174, Gümüshtekin assumed the guardianship for Nur ad-Din's underage son, as-Salih Ismail al-Malik and took his ward from Damascus to Aleppo. He made an alliance with as-Salih's cousin Sayf al-Din Ghazi II of Mosul against Ibn al-Muqaddam who had taken control of Damascus. Ibn al-Muqaddam sought assistance from the Ayubbid ruler of Egypt, Saladin, and surrendered the city to him. As-Salih granted Harem in iqta' to him.

Gümüshtekin who was the governor of Aleppo and neighboring lands, had an agreement with Bohemond III of Antioch to release Raynald of Châtillon, along with Joscelin III of Courtenay and all other Christians prisoners in 1176. After Gümüshtekin had as-Salih's vizier assassinated in a play for influence over the boy, he was tortured and executed at the walls of Harem for his alleged negotiations with the Franks, or crusaders, in September 1177.

== Sources ==
- Barber, Malcolm (2012). The Crusader States. Yale University Press. ISBN 978-0-300-11312-9. JSTOR j.ctt32bvs5.
- Holt, Peter Malcolm (1986). The Age Of The Crusades-The Near East from the eleventh century to 1517. Pearson Longman. ISBN 978-0-58249-302-5.
- Köhler, Michael A. (2013). Alliances and Treaties between Frankish and Muslim Rulers in the Middle East: Cross-Cultural Diplomacy in the Period of the Crusades. Translated by Peter M. Holt. Brill Publishers. ISBN 978-90-04-24857-1.
- Lyons, M. C.; Jackson, D. E. P. (1982). Saladin: the Politics of the Holy War. Cambridge University Press. ISBN 978-0-521-31739-9.
- Runciman, Steven (1952). A history of the Crusades. And the Frankish East, 1100-118. Vol. 2. Cambridge: Cambridge University Press.
