= As-Salih Ismail al-Malik =

- Emir
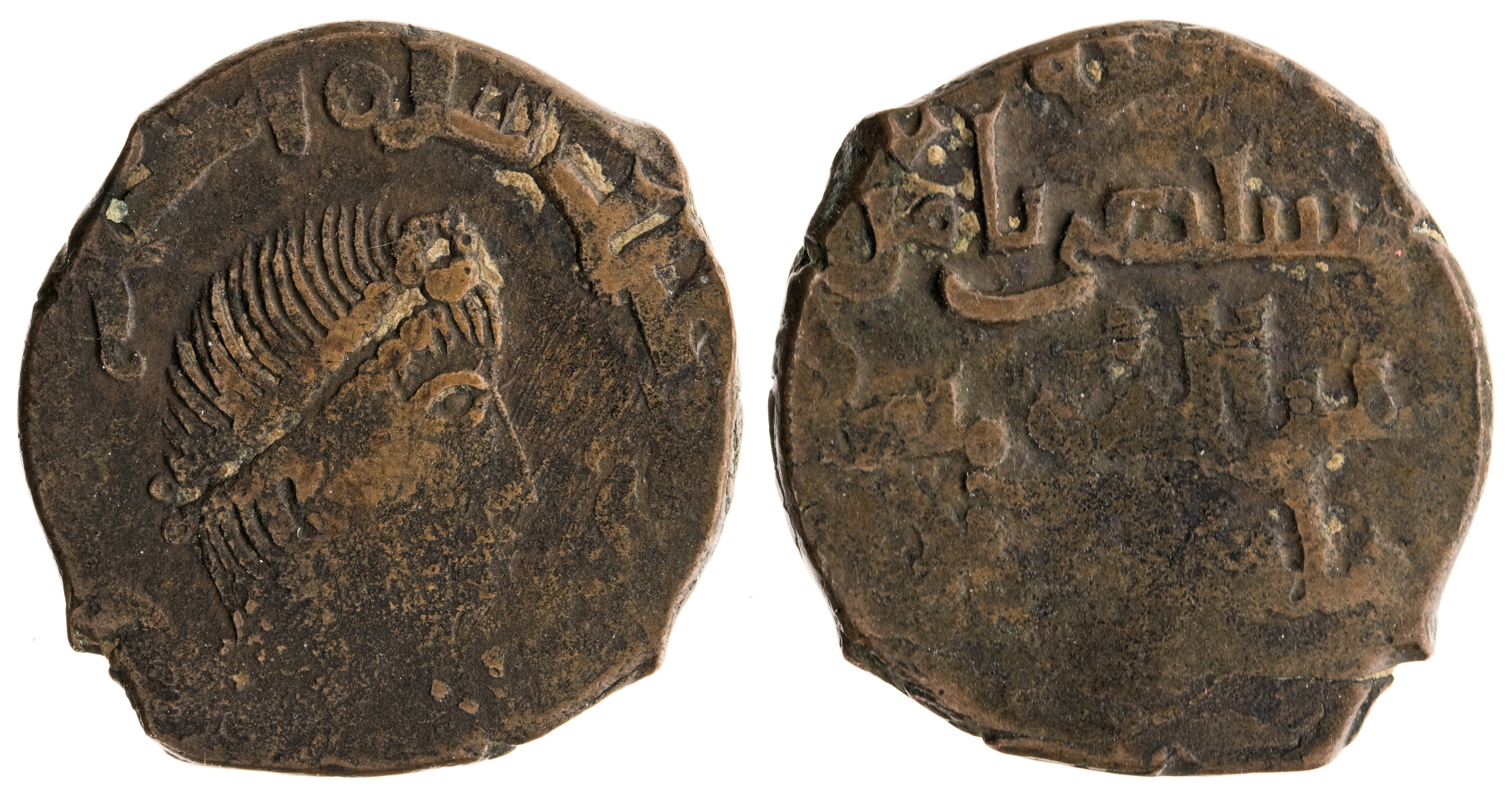
- Coinage of Al-Salih Isma`il, Halab, dated 571 H (1175-1176 CE)

Zengid Emir of Aleppo and Damascus
- Reign: 1174 (few months)
- Predecessor: Nur al-Din Zengi
- Successor: Salah al-Din (as Ayyubid sultan)
- Born: 1163
- Died: 1181 (aged 17–18)
- Arabic: الصالح إسماعيل
- House: Zengid
- Father: Nur al-Din Zengi
- Religion: Sunni Islam

Abu al-Fath Ismail bin Nur al-Din Mahmud al-Zangi (Arabic: أبو الفتوح إسماعيل بن نور الدين محمود بن عماد الدين بن آق سنقر الزنكي) commonly known as As-Salih Ismaʿil al-Malik (Arabic: الصالح إسماعيل; 1163–1181) was the Zengid emir of Damascus and emir of Aleppo in 1174, the son of Nur al-Din Zengi.

== Biography ==
He was only eleven years old when his father died in 1174. Receiving the news, the castellan of Aleppo Jamal al-Din Shadbakht al-Hindi gathered the nobles and took from them the oath of allegiance to as-Salih on the pretext that Nur al-Din had appointed as-Salih his heir, before revealing his death. As-Salih came under the protection of the eunuch Gümüshtekin and was taken to Aleppo, while Nur ad-Din's officers competed for supremacy. In Egypt, Saladin recognized as-Salih as his lord. In 1174, Saladin took Baalbek after a four-month siege and then entered Damascus, proclaiming himself to be Ismail's true regent. In 1176, Saladin defeated the Zengids outside the city, married Ismat ad-Din Khatun, the widow of Nur al-Din, and was recognized as ruler of Syria. As-Salih died in 1181 of illness. Following his death, Saladin took control of Aleppo and added it to his rule under the expanding Ayyubid Sultanate. According to crusader legend, his mother was the sister of Bertrand of Toulouse, Razi Khatun, who had been captured by Nur al-Din in the aftermath of the Second Crusade; a similar legend existed concerning the mother of Imad al-Din Zengi, as-Salih's grandfather.

Regnal titles
Preceded by Nur ad-Din Zangi	Emir of Damascus; 1174	Succeeded by Saladin
