= Sayf al-Din Ghazi I =

- Emir of Mosul

Zengid Emir of Mosul
- Reign: 1146-1149
- Predecessor: Imad al-Din Zengi
- Successor: Qutb al-Din Mawdud
- Born: 1108 or 1116
- Died: 1149 (aged 41 or 33)
Names
- Sayf al-Din Ghazi I ibn Imad al-Din Zengi
- Father: Imad al-Din Zengi
- Religion: Sunni Islam

Sayf al-Din Ghazi I (Arabic: سيف الدين غازي, romanized: Sayf ad-Dīn Ghāzī, died 1149) was the Emir of Mosul from 1146 to 1149, who fought in the Second Crusade. He was the eldest son of Imad al-Din Zengi of Mosul, and the elder brother of Nur ad-Din.

== Regaining control ==
In 1146 Imad al-Din Zengi was besieging the fortress of Qal'at Ja'bar when he was assassinated on September 15 by one of his servants who wanted to escape punishment. His forces were scattered, but Imad ad-Din Zengi's two sons were able to regain control and to divide informally the empire: Sayf al-Din succeeded him in Mosul and the Jazirah (northern Iraq) while Nur al-Din succeeded in Aleppo. Saif ad-Din had first to fight to secure his position in Mosul.

Two years before, the Seljuk sultan Mahmud II had named his cadet son Alp-Arslan as overlord of Zengi, but the latter had neutralized him and carried with him at the siege. At Zengi's death, Alp-Arslan tried to exploit the ensuing disorder to gain the power in Mosul. Two of Zengi's advisors, the head of the diwan al-Din Muhammad Jamal and hajib Amir Salah al-Din Muhammad al-Yaghsiyani took the side of Saif ad-Din: taking advantage of the inexperience of the young Seljuk, giving Saif ad-Din the time necessary to take control of Mosul. When Alp Arslan appeared in Mosul, he was arrested and imprisoned in the citadel.

== Damascus ==
In 1148, together with his brother Nur al-Din Zengi, he marched south to help defend Damascus during the Second Crusade (see Siege of Damascus) from the Crusaders. The atabeg of the city, Mu'in ad-Din Unur, however refused them entrance, using the presence of Zangi's sons to convince the Crusaders to release the siege.

== Death ==
He died in November 1149 and was succeeded by another brother, Qutb al-Din Mawdud.

== See also ==
- Zengid dynasty

== Sources ==
- Grousset, Rene (1935). Histoire des croisades et du royaume franc de Jérusalem - II. 1131-1187 L'équilibre. Paris: Perrin. p. 1013.

Regnal titles
Preceded by Zengi	Emir of Mosul; 1146–1149	Succeeded by Qutb ad-Din Mawdud
