= Nur al-Din Zengi =

Emir of Aleppo (1146–1174) and Damascus (1154–1174)

Nur ad-Din Mahmud
- Emir
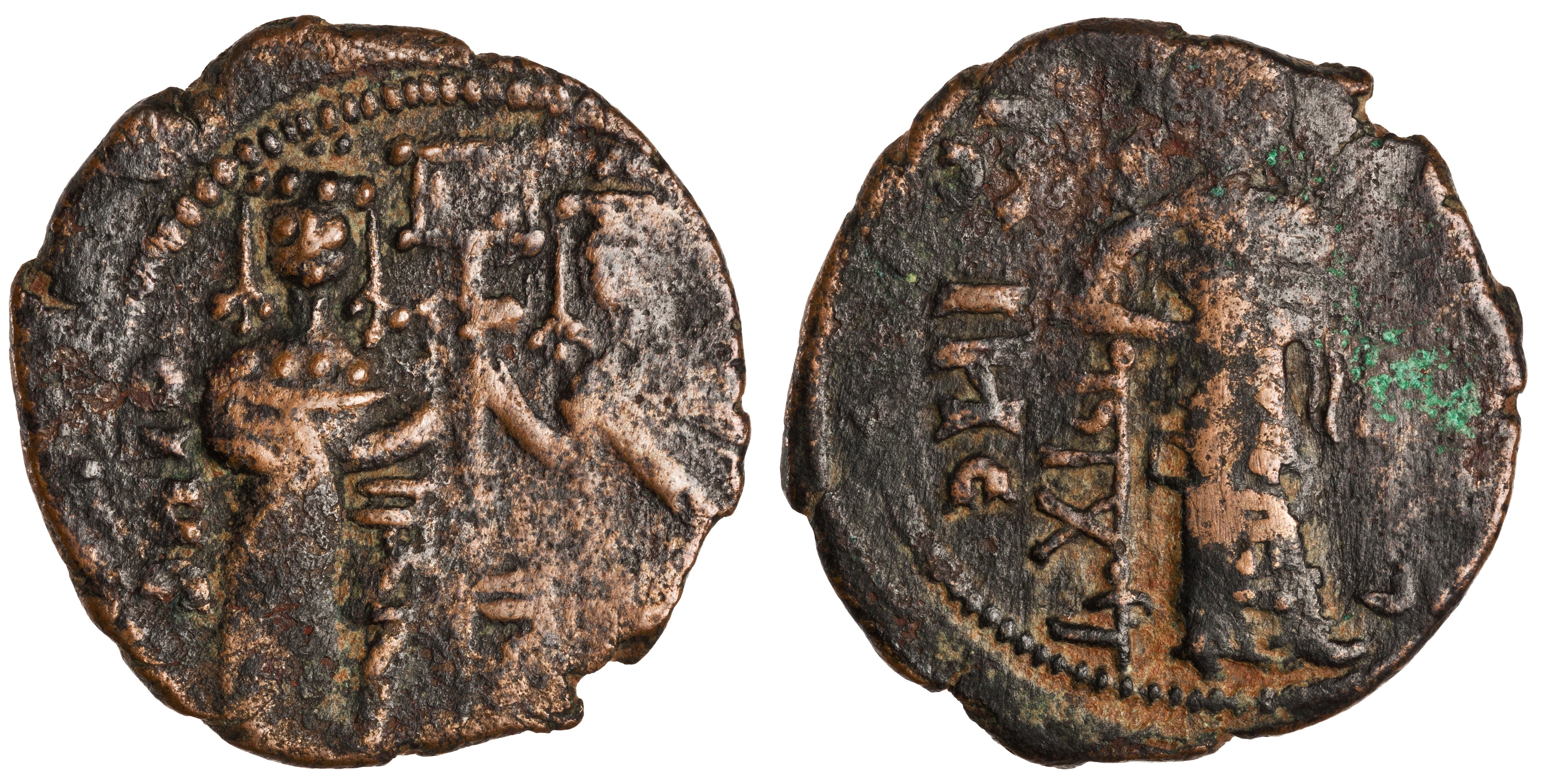
- Coinage of Nur al-Din (Aleppo mint). Obverse: Two Byzantine-style imperial figures standing facing, holding between them labarum set on three steps; stars, name and titles of Nur al-Din Mahmud, and blundered Greek legends in field. Reverse: Christ standing facing; titles of Nur al-Din Mahmud and blundered Greek legends in field.

Emir of Aleppo
- Reign: 1146 – 15 May 1174
- Predecessor: Imad ad-Din Zengi
- Successor: As-Salih Ismail al-Malik

Emir of Damascus
- Reign: 1154 – 15 May 1174
- Predecessor: Mujir ad-Din Abaq
- Successor: As-Salih Ismail al-Malik
- Born: 1118; Aleppo
- Died: 15 May 1174 (aged 55–56); Damascus, Seljuk Empire
- Burial: Nur al-Din Madrasa, Damascus, Syria
- Spouse: Ismat ad-Din Khatun (m.1147)
- Issue: As-Salih Ismail al-Malik
Regnal name
- al-Malik al-Adil Abul-Qasim Nur ad-Din Mahmud Ibn 'Imad ad-Din Zengi
- Dynasty: Zengid dynasty
- Father: Imad al-Din Zengi
- Religion: Sunni Islam

Al-Malik al-Adil Abu al-Qasim Nūr al-Dīn Maḥmūd bin Imad al-Dīn Zengī (Arabic: الملكُ العادلُ أبو القاسمِ نور الدين محمود بن عمادِ الدِّين زَنْكِي; February 1118 – 15 May 1174), commonly known as Nur ad-Din or Nureddin (lit. "Light of the Faith" in Arabic) and al-Malik al-Adil (lit. "the Just King" in Arabic), was a member of the Turkoman Zengid dynasty.

Nur al-Din's political and epigraphic representation in Syria increasingly departed from the Turco-Persian traditions employed by his father. His monumental inscriptions abandoned Turkic and Persian titulature in favour of Arabic ones, a transformation interpreted by historians as emphasizing his position as the ruler of an Arab state. He reigned from 1146 to 1174.

== Life and career ==
=== War against Crusaders ===
Born in February 1118, Nur al-Din was the second son of Imad al-Din Zengi, the Turcoman atabeg of Aleppo and Mosul, who was a devoted enemy of the crusader presence in Syria. After the assassination of his father in 1146, Nur al-Din and his older brother Sayf al-Din Ghazi I divided the kingdom between themselves, with Nur al-Din governing Aleppo and Saif al-Din Ghazi establishing himself in Mosul. The border between the two new kingdoms was formed by the Khabur River. Almost as soon as he became ruler, Nur al-Din attacked the Principality of Antioch, seizing several castles in the north of Syria, while at the same time he defeated an attempt by Joscelin II to recover the County of Edessa, which had been conquered by Imad al-Din in 1144. In 1146, after the Frankish attempt to reoccupy Edessa, Nur al-Din massacred the local Armenian Christian population of the city and destroyed its fortifications, (Note: A Frankish attempt to take advantage of the situation by reoccupying Edessa in November 1146, led by Joscelin II and Baldwin of Marash, failed utterly, the count fleeing ignominiously, Baldwin meeting a heroic death, the city's walls being levelled and the local Armenian Christians suffering the massacre they had avoided two years earlier.) in punishment for assisting Joscelin in this attempt. The women and children of Edessa were enslaved.

Battle of Edessa in 1146, by Richard de Montbaston (1337), Bibliothèque Nationale de France

Nur ad-Din sought to make alliances with his Muslim neighbours in northern Iraq and Syria in order to strengthen the Muslim front against their Crusader enemies. In 1147, he signed a bilateral treaty with Mu'in al-Din Unur, governor of Damascus. As part of this agreement, he also married Mu'in al-Din's daughter Ismat al-Din Khatun. Together Mu'in al-Din and Nur al-Din besieged the cities of Bosra and Salkhad, which had been captured by a rebellious vassal of Mu'in al-Din named Altuntash, but Mu'in al-Din was always suspicious of Nur al-Din's intentions and did not want to offend his former crusader allies in Jerusalem, who had helped defend Damascus against Zengi. To reassure Mu'in al-Din, Nur al-Din curtailed his stay in Damascus and turned instead towards the Principality of Antioch, where he was able to seize Artah, Kafar Latha, Basarfut, and Bara.

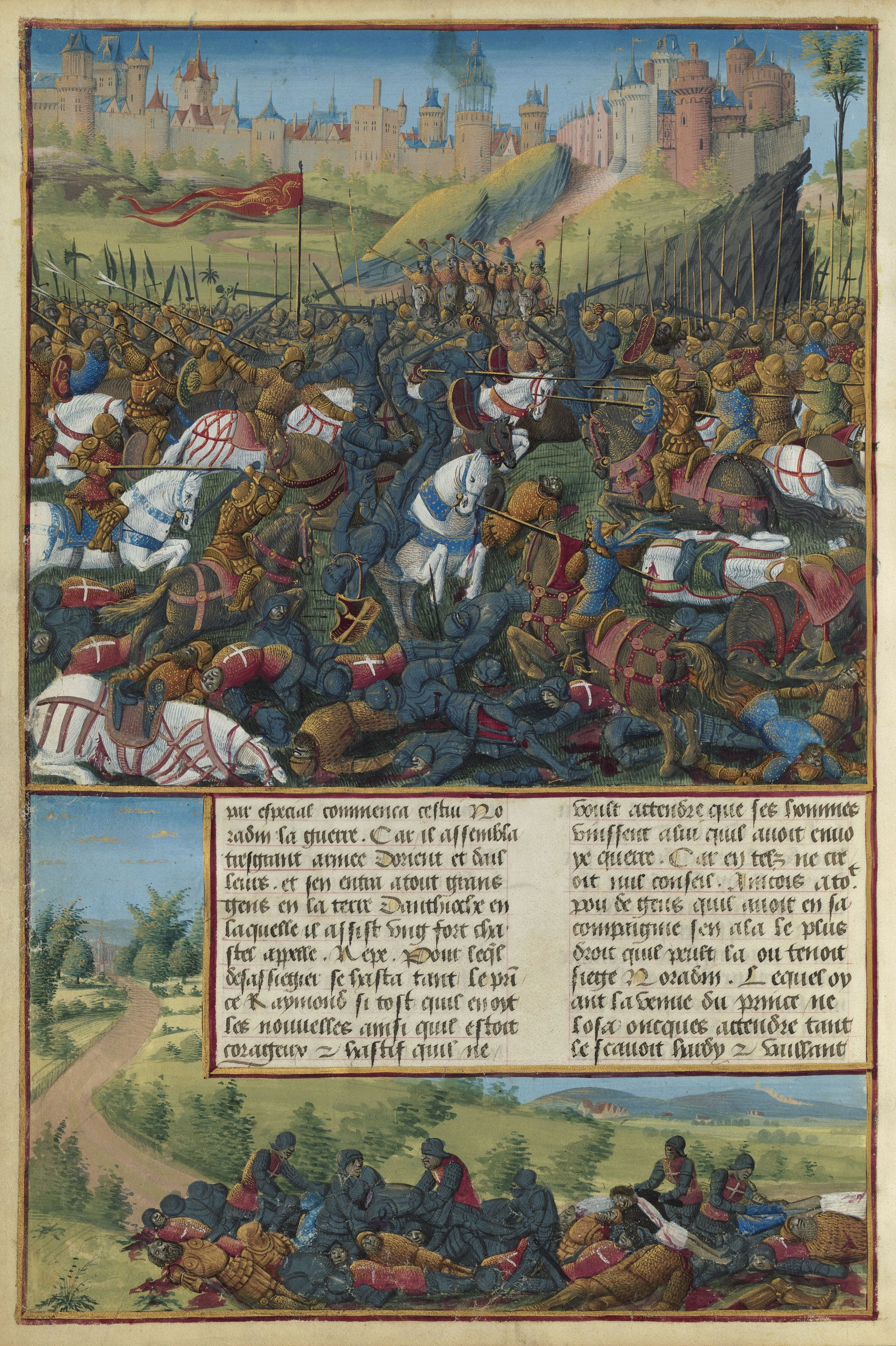
Nūr al-Din's victory at the Battle of Inab, 1149. Illustration from the Passages d'outremer, c. 1490.

In 1148, the Second Crusade arrived in Syria, led by Louis VII of France and Conrad III of Germany. Nur al-Din's victories and the Crusaders' losses in Asia Minor however had made the recovery of Edessa – their original goal – practically impossible. Given that Aleppo was too far off from Jerusalem for an attack and Damascus, recently allied with the Kingdom of Jerusalem against Zengids, had entered into an alliance with Nur al-Din, the Crusaders decided to attack Damascus, the conquest of which would preclude a combination of Jerusalem's enemies. Mu'in al-Din threatened to turn the city over to Nur al-Din if he was unable to defend it, but the crusader siege collapsed after only four days.

Nur al-Din took advantage of the failure of the Crusade to prepare another attack against Antioch. In 1149, he launched an offensive against the territories dominated by the castle of Harim, situated on the eastern bank of the Orontes River, after which he besieged the castle of Inab. The Prince of Antioch, Raymond of Poitiers, quickly came to the aid of the besieged citadel. The Muslim army destroyed the Crusader army at the Battle of Inab, during which Raymond was killed, moreover, Raymond's head was sent to Nur al-Din, who sent it along to the Caliph al-Muqtafi in Baghdad. Nur al-Din marched all the way to the coast and expressed his dominance of Syria by symbolically bathing in the Mediterranean. He did not, however, attack Antioch itself; he was content with capturing all Antiochene territory east of the Orontes and leaving a rump state around the city, which in any case soon fell under the suzerainty of the Byzantine Empire. In 1150, he defeated Joscelin II for a final time, after allying with the Seljuk Sultan of Rüm, Mas'ud (whose daughter he also married). Joscelin was blinded and died in his prison in Aleppo in 1159. In the Battle of Aintab, Nur al-Din tried but failed to prevent King Baldwin III of Jerusalem's evacuation of the Latin Christian residents of Turbessel. In 1152, Nur al-Din captured and burned Tortosa, briefly occupying the town.

=== Unification of the territory ===
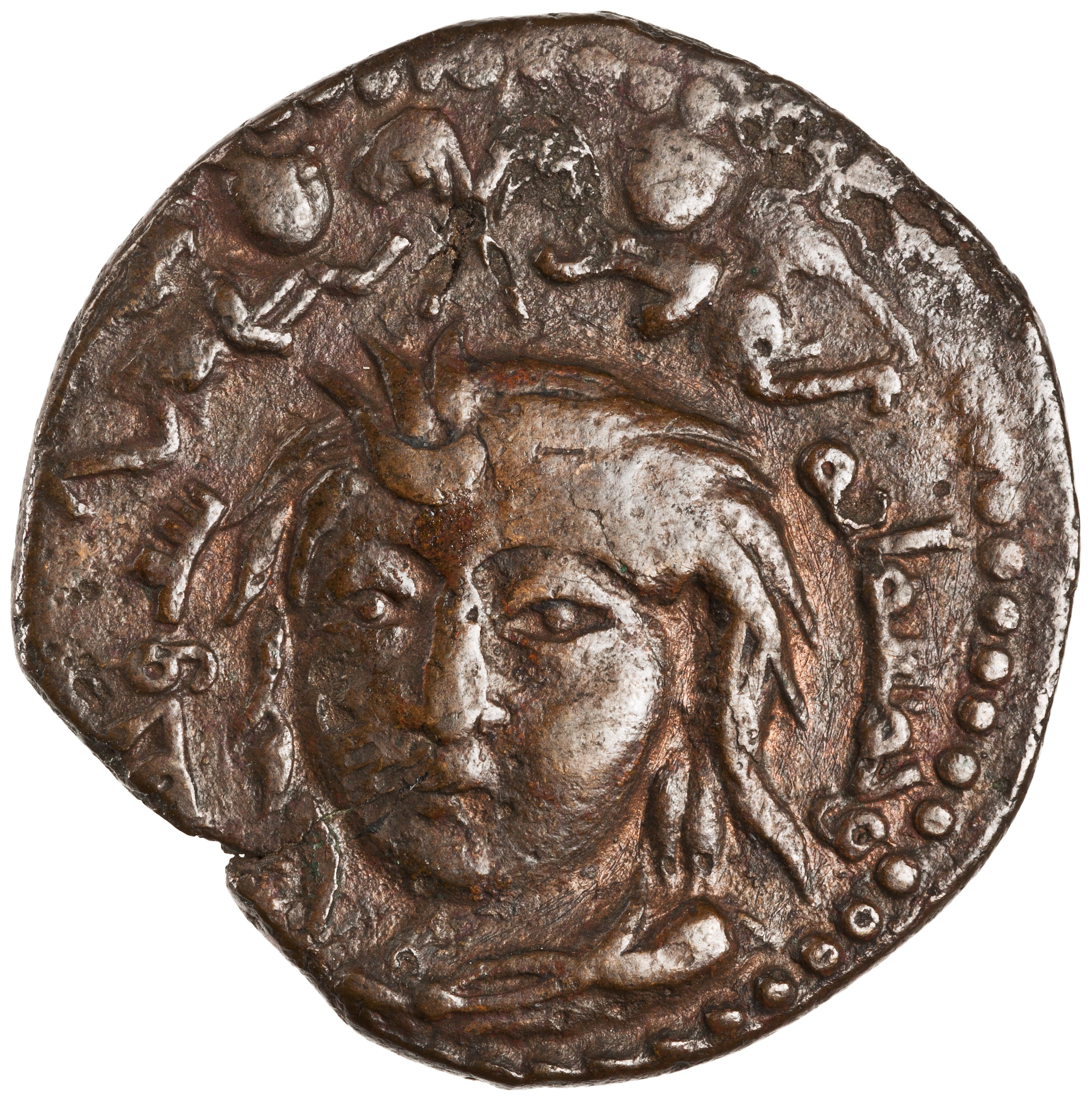
A brother of Nur al-Din, Qutb al-Din Mawdud ruled concurrently in the Mosul region from 1149 to 1170. Coinage dated to AH 556 (1160-1161 CE).

It was Nur al-Din's ambition to unite the various Muslim forces between the Euphrates and the Nile as a common front against the crusaders. In 1149 Saif al-Din Ghazi died, and a younger brother, Qutb al-Din Mawdud, succeeded him. Qutb al-Din recognized Nur al-Din as overlord of Mosul, so that the major cities of Mosul and Aleppo were united under one man. Damascus was all that remained as an obstacle to the unification of Syria.

After the failure of the Second Crusade, Mu'in al-Din had renewed his treaty with the crusaders, and after his death in 1149, his successor Mujir al-Din Abaq followed the same policy. In 1150 and 1151, Nur al-Din besieged the city, but retreated each time with no success, aside from empty recognition of his suzerainty. When Ascalon was captured by the crusaders in 1153, Mujir al-Din forbade Nur al-Din from travelling across his territory. The growing weakness of Damascus under Mujir al-Din allowed Nur al-Din to overthrow him in 1154, with help from the population of the city. Damascus was annexed to Zengid territory, and all of Syria was unified under the authority of Nur al-Din, from Edessa in the north to the Hauran in the south. Nur al-Din was generous in his victory, and allowed Abaq to flee with his property, later granting him fiefdoms in the vicinity of Homs. He was cautious not to attack Jerusalem right away, and even continued to send the yearly tribute established by Mujir al-Din; meanwhile he briefly became involved in affairs to the north of Mosul, where a succession dispute in the Sultanate of Rum threatened Edessa and other cities.

In 1157, Nur al-Din besieged the Knights Hospitaller in the crusader fortress of Banias, routed a relief army from Jerusalem led by King Baldwin III, and captured Grand Master Bertrand de Blanquefort. However, he fell ill that year and the crusaders were given a brief respite from his attacks. In 1159, the Byzantine emperor Manuel I Komnenos arrived to assert his authority in Antioch, and the crusaders hoped he would send an expedition against Aleppo. However, Nur al-Din sent ambassadors and negotiated an alliance with the emperor against the Seljuks, much to the crusaders' dismay. Nur al-Din, along with the Danishmends of eastern Anatolia, attacked the Seljuk sultan Kilij Arslan II from the east the next year, while Manuel attacked from the west. Later in 1160, Nur al-Din captured the Prince of Antioch, Raynald of Châtillon after a raid in the Anti-Taurus Mountains; Raynald remained in captivity for the next sixteen years. By 1162, with Antioch under nominal Byzantine control and the crusader states further south powerless to make any further attacks on Syria, Nur al-Din made a pilgrimage to Mecca. Soon after he returned, he learned of the death of King Baldwin III of Jerusalem, and out of respect for such a formidable opponent he refrained from attacking the crusader kingdom: William of Tyre reports that Nur al-Din said "We should sympathize with their grief and in pity spare them, because they have lost a prince such as the rest of the world does not possess today."

=== Conquest of Egypt ===
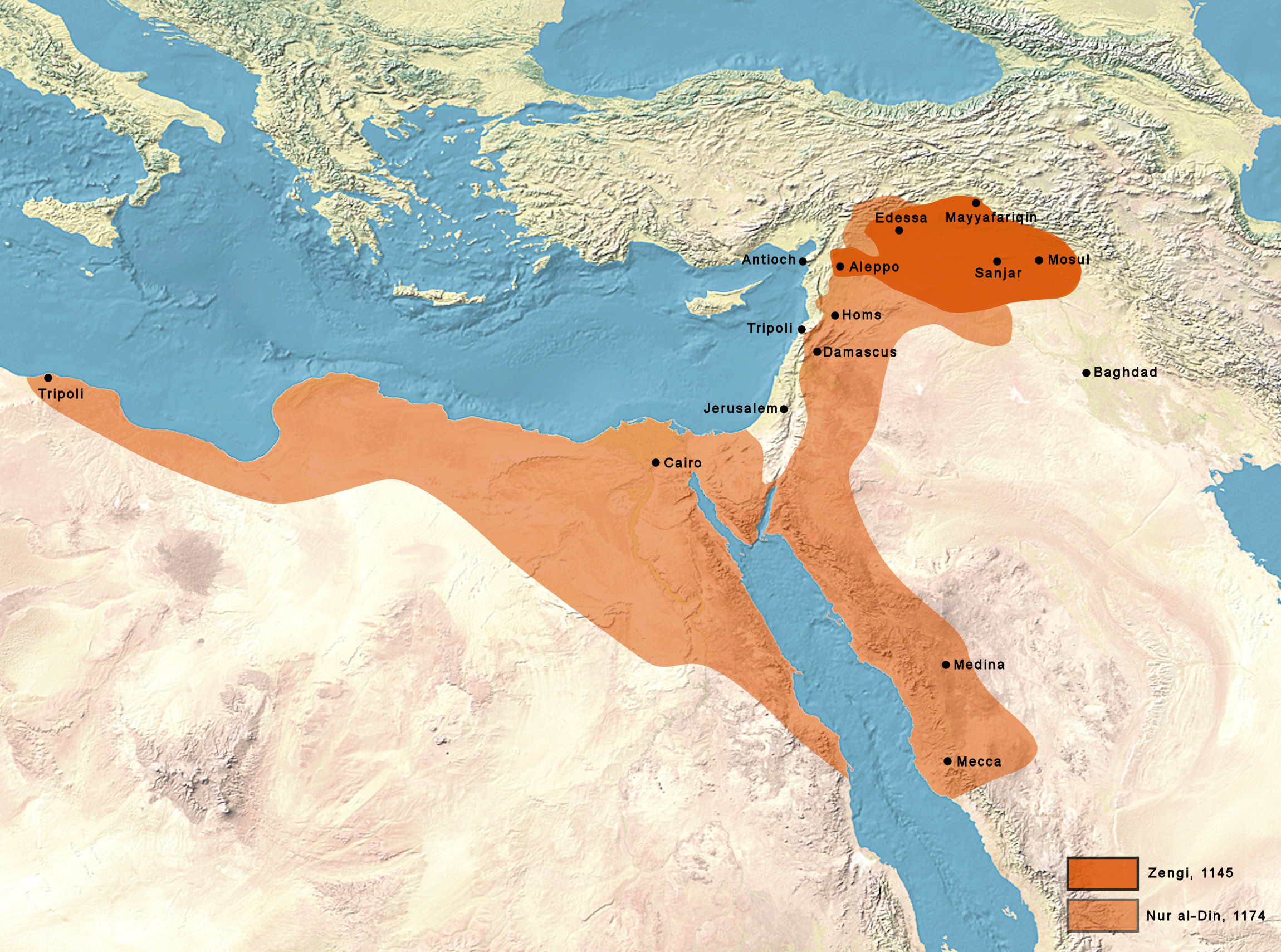
The Zengid state under Zengi in 1145, and expansion under Nur al-Din Zengi in 1174 CE.

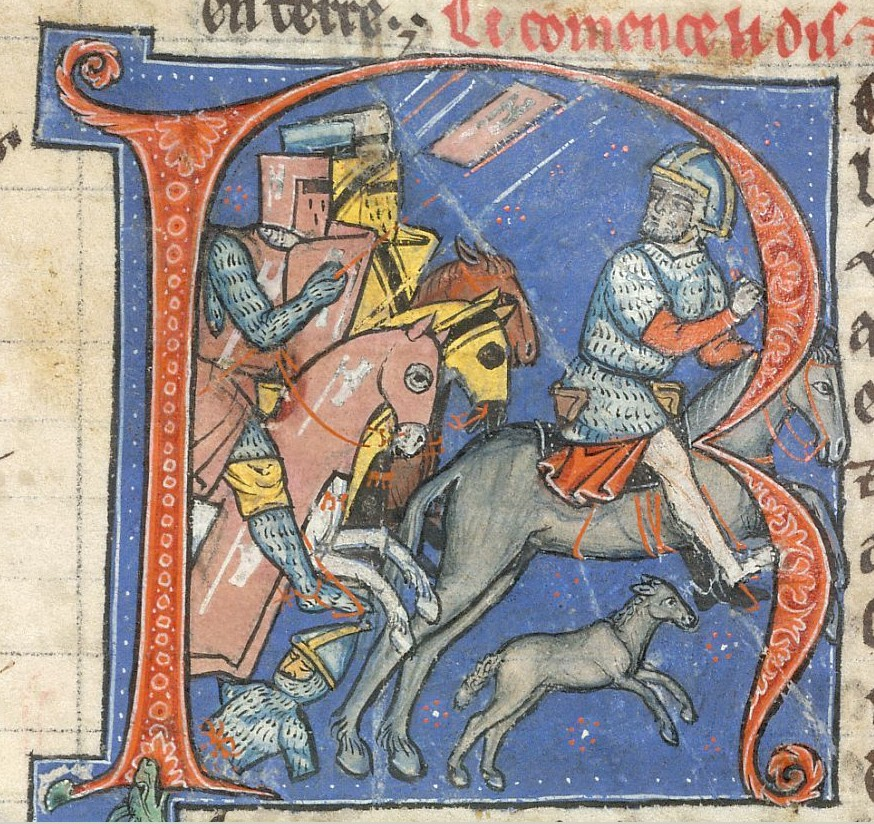
Mail-coated Nur al-Din Zengi at the victorious Battle of Harim (1164). "Histoire d'Outremer" (1232–1261) - BL Yates Thompson MS 12

As there was now nothing the crusaders could do in Syria, they were forced to look to the south if they wanted to expand their territory. The capture of Ascalon had already succeeded in cutting off Egypt from Syria, and Egypt had been politically weakened by a series of very young Fatimid caliphs. By 1163, the caliph was the young al-Adid, but the country was ruled by the vizier Shawar. That year, Shawar was overthrown by Dirgham; soon afterwards, the King of Jerusalem, Amalric I, led an offensive against Egypt, on the pretext that the Fatimids were not paying the tribute they had promised to pay during the reign of Baldwin III. This campaign failed and he was forced to return to Jerusalem, but it provoked Nur al-Din to lead a campaign of his own against the crusaders in Syria in order to turn their attention away from Egypt. Nur al-Din's attack on Tripoli was unsuccessful, but he was soon visited by the exiled Shawar, who begged him to send an army and restore him to the vizierate. Nur al-Din did not want to spare his own army for a defense of Egypt, but his Kurdish general Shirkuh was given permission to invade in 1164. In response, Dirgham allied with Amalric, but the king could not mobilize in time to save him. Dirgham was killed during Shirkuh's invasion and Shawar was restored as vizier.

Shawar immediately expelled Shirkuh and allied with Amalric, who arrived to besiege Shirkuh at Bilbeis. Shirkuh agreed to abandon Egypt when Amalric was forced to return home, after Nur al-Din attacked Antioch and besieged the castle of Harenc. There, Nur al-Din routed the combined armies of Antioch and Tripoli and captured most of the Crusader armies' leadership, including Raymond III, Joscelin III, and Bohemond III, leaving three major principalities of the Crusader states leaderless. However, he refused to attack Antioch itself, fearing reprisals from the Byzantines. Instead he besieged and captured Banias, and for the next two years continually raided the frontiers of the crusader states. In 1166, Shirkuh was sent again to Egypt. Amalric followed him at the beginning of 1167, and a formal treaty was established between Amalric and Shawar, with the nominal support of the caliph. The crusaders occupied Alexandria and Cairo and made Egypt a tributary state, but due to the unpopularity of the Egyptian alliance with the Crusaders, Shirkuh managed to take Alexandria without bloodshed. The Crusaders besieged Alexandria and famine set in quickly due to the city's limited stores of food. Shirkuh organized a sortie and broke through the enemy lines, leaving command of Alexandria to his nephew, Saladin. In the same year, Nur al-Din raided the County of Tripoli, in which he temporarily captured Areimeh Castle, Chastel Blanc and Gibelacar, exploiting the captivity of Raymond III. Ultimately, Amalric could not hold Egypt while Nur al-Din still held Syria, and he was forced to return to Jerusalem. The siege of Alexandria was lifted, and Shirkuh's forces withdrew from Egypt as well.

In 1168, Amalric sought an alliance with Manuel and invaded Egypt once more. Shawar's son Khalil had had enough, and with support from Caliph al-Adid requested help from Nur al-Din and Shirkuh. At the beginning of 1169, Shirkuh arrived and the crusaders once more were forced to retreat. This time Nur al-Din's commander gained full control of Egypt. Shawar was executed and Shirkuh was named vizier of the newly conquered territory. Shirkuh died later that year and was succeeded by his nephew Saladin. One last invasion of Egypt was launched by Amalric and Manuel, but it was disorganized and came to nothing. Saladin continued to swear nominal fealty to Nur al-Din until his death in 1174, but their relationship became increasingly tense. Saladin was reluctant to join forces with Nur al-Din against Crusader armies or holdings, withdrawing his own armies on several occasions when Nur al-Din's forces arrived to assist him. Nur al-Din's insistence that Saladin abolish the Shi'a caliphate further raised tensions between them. Saladin was reluctant to do so because the authority of the Caliphate in Egypt was a source of legitimacy for his rule. He feared popular backlash, and was bound by friendship and obligation to the Caliph al-Adid. Nonetheless, Saladin capitulated to Nur al-Din and the Fatimid Caliphate was abolished in 1171.

== Death and legacy ==
=== Death and succession ===
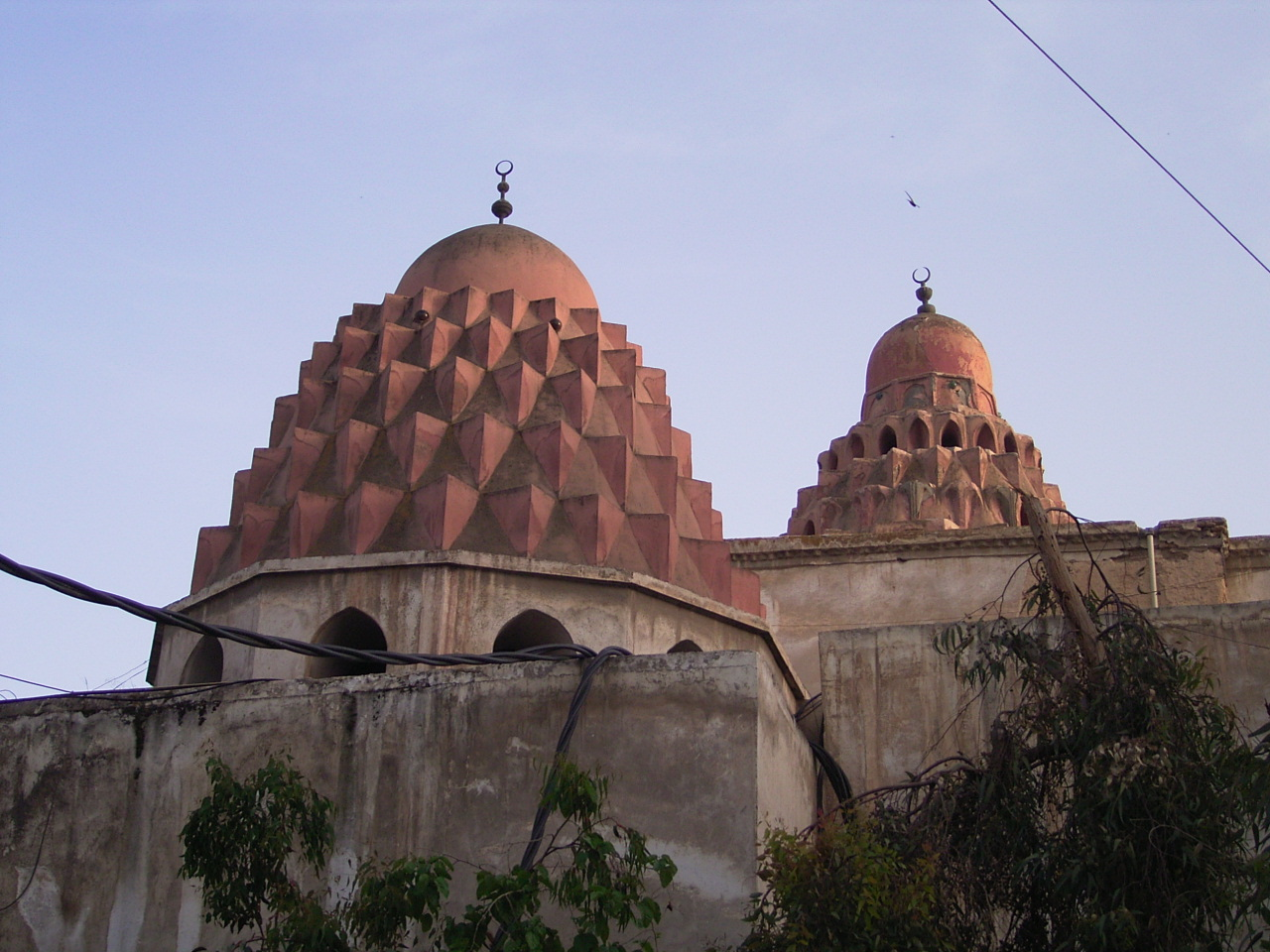
Domes of Nur al-Din Madrasa in Damascus, where he is buried

During this time Nur al-Din was busy in the north, fighting the Artuqids, and in 1170 he had to settle a dispute between his nephews when his brother Qutb al-Din died. With Egypt conquered in his name, Nur al-Din believed that he had accomplished his goal of uniting the Arab states of the Levant. However, near the end of his life, especially after the death of Saladin's father Najm al-Din Ayyub, Nur al-Din believed he could no longer trust anyone in Saladin's court to maintain the young ruler's fealty to him. Nur al-Din began preparations to invade Egypt and depose Saladin, but he was seized by a fever due to complications from a peritonsillar abscess. He died at the age of 56 on 15 May 1174 in the Citadel of Damascus. He was initially buried there, before being reburied in the Nur al-Din Madrasa. His young son As-Salih Ismail al-Malik became his legitimate heir, and Saladin declared himself his vassal, maintaining the de jure unity of Syria and Egypt under As-Salih's rule. When As-Salih died suddenly at the age of eighteen, Saladin defeated the other claimants to the throne and took power in Syria in 1185, uniting Syria and Egypt not just in name, as they were during Nur ad-Din's reign, but in fact.

=== Legacy ===
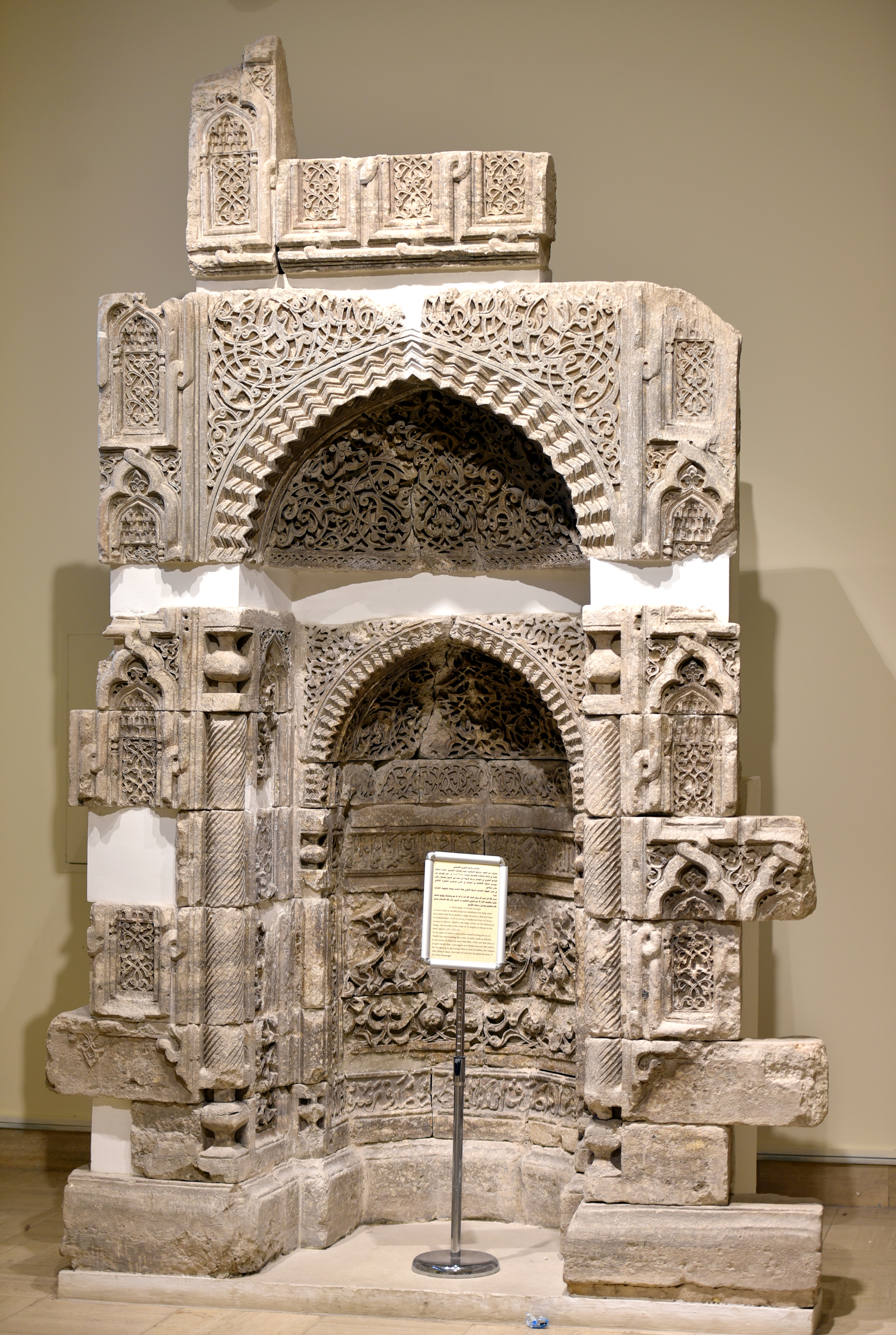
Mihrab from al-Nuri Mosque in Mosul, founded by Nur al-Din Zengi, 12th century CE, Iraq Museum.

According to William of Tyre, although Nur al-Din was "a mighty persecutor of the Christian name and faith," he was also "a just prince, valiant and wise, and according to the traditions of his race, a religious man." His sense of justice was never denied to anyone, regardless of their creed or origins. As a result of his justice, a Christian foreigner was said to have settled into Damascus, which was under Nur al-Din's reign. Nur al-Din was especially religious after his illness and his pilgrimage. He considered the crusaders foreigners in Muslim territory, who had come to Outremer to plunder the land and profane its sacred places. Nevertheless, he tolerated the Christians who lived under his authority, aside from the Armenians of Edessa, and regarded Emperor Manuel with deep respect. In contrast to Nur al-Din's respectful reaction to the death of Baldwin III, Amalric I immediately besieged Banias upon learning of the emir's death, and extorted a vast amount of money from his widow.

During Nur al-Din's reign, forty-two madrasas were built in Syria, of which half he personally sponsored. Through the construction of these madrasas Nur al-Din was ensuring the creation of Sunni Islamic qadis and imams. Nur al-Din himself enjoyed having specialists read to him from the Hadith, and his professors even awarded him a diploma in Hadith narration. He had bimaristans (hospitals) constructed in his cities as well, one of them is Nur al-Din Bimaristan and built caravanserais on the roads for travelers and pilgrims. He held court several times a week so that people could seek justice from him against his generals, governors, or other employees who had committed some crime. Mosques that are attributed to Nur al-Din include the Nur al-Din Mosque in Hama, the Great Mosque of al-Nuri in Homs, and the Great Mosque of al-Nuri in Mosul.

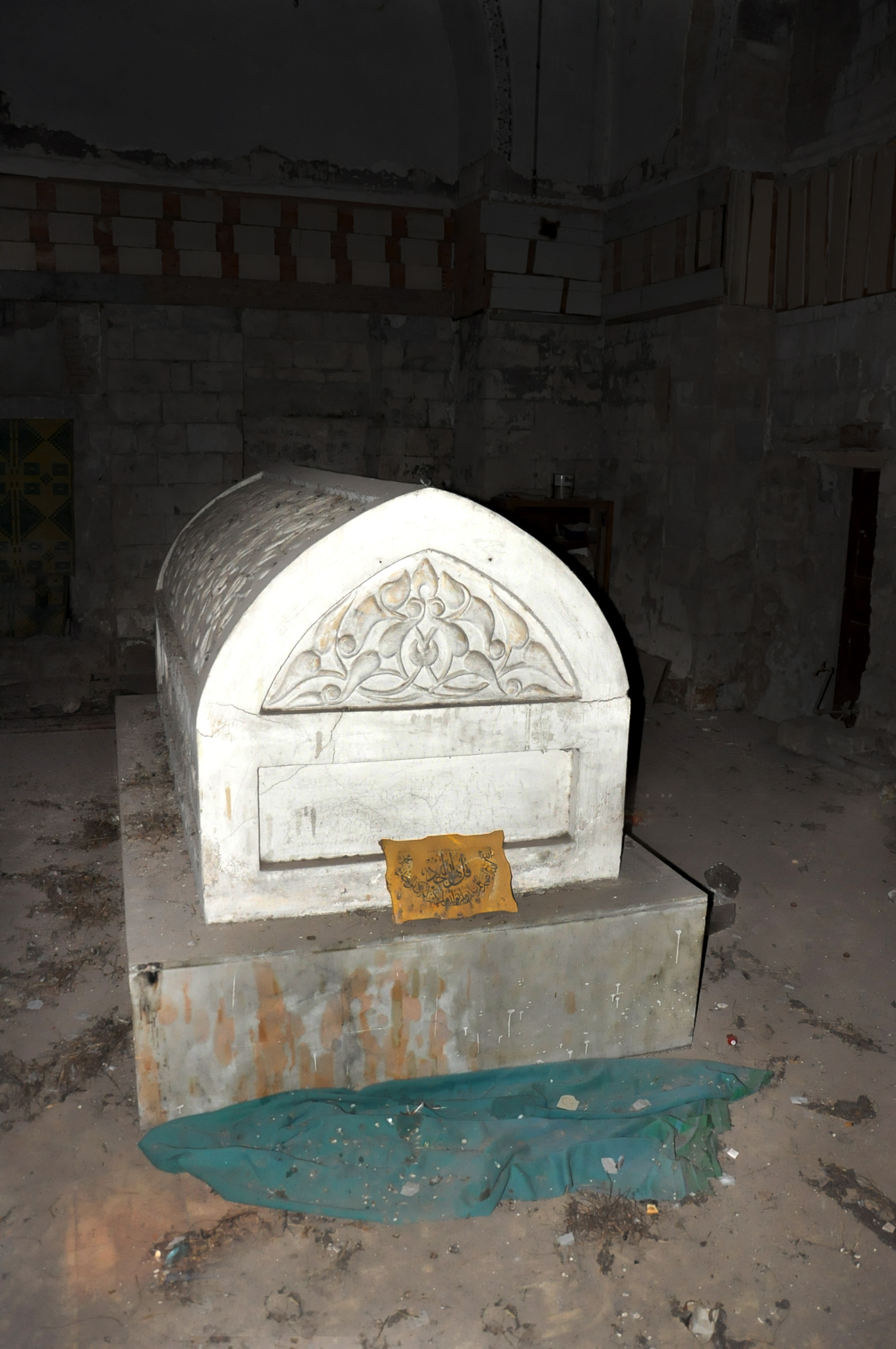
Nur al-Din's tomb

Nur al-Din's Sunni orthodoxy can be seen in his public works. His repair of the Roman aqueduct in Aleppo insinuated an anti-Shia polemic, and the conversion of two Shia mosques into madrasas, one Shafi'i another Hanafi, reinforce his insistence of promoting Sunni Islam. Consequently, in November 1148, he forbade the Shia call to prayer in Aleppo and any public displays of Shi'ism.

In the Muslim world, he remains a figure of military courage, piety, and modesty. Sir Steven Runciman said that he loved, above all else, justice.

The Damascene chronicler Ibn al-Qalanisi generally speaks of Nur al-Din in majestic terms, although he himself died in 1160, and did not witness the later events of Nur al-Din's reign.

The former Syrian Islamist rebel group Nour al-Din al-Zenki Movement, which was active in the Syrian Civil War in Aleppo, is named after him.

=== In popular culture ===
- In the Syrian series Salah Al-deen Al-Ayyobi (2001), Nur al-Din is played by Bassem Yakhour.
- In the Turkish drama Kudüs Fatihi Selahaddin Eyyubi, he is played by Mehmet Ali Nuroğlu.

== Sources ==
- Altan, Ebru (2014). "Nur al-Din Mahmud b. Zangi (1146–1174): One of the prominent leaders of the struggle against the Crusaders". Tarih Dergisi.
- Asbridge, Thomas (2012). The Crusades: The War for the Holy Land. Simon & Schuster.
- Barber, Malcolm (1994). The New Knighthood: A History of the Order of the Temple. Cambridge University Press.
- Elisseeff, N. (1995). "Nur al-Din Mahmud b. Zanki". In Bosworth, C. E.; van Donzel, E.; Heinrichs, W. P. & Lecomte, G. (eds.). The Encyclopaedia of Islam, Second Edition. Volume VIII: Ned–Sam. Leiden: E. J. Brill. ISBN 978-90-04-09834-3.
- The Damascus Chronicle of the Crusades, Extracted and Translated from the Chronicle of Ibn al-Qalanisi. H.A.R. Gibb, 1932 (reprint, Dover Publications, 2002)
- Jaspert, Nikolas (2006). The Crusades. Taylor & Francis.
- Jotischky, Andrew (2017). Crusading and the Crusader States. Routledge.
- Kök, Bahattin (2007). "Nûredd İn Zengî, Mahmud". TDV Encyclopedia of Islam, Vol. 33 (Nesi̇h – Osmanlilar) (in Turkish). Istanbul: Presidency of Religious Affairs, Centre for Islamic Studies. pp. 259–262. ISBN 978-975-389-455-5.
- Lock, Peter (2006). The Routledge Companion to the Crusades. Routledge.
- Raby, Julian (2004). "Nur Al-Din, the Qstal al-Shu-aybiyya, and the "Classical Revival"". Muqarnas: Essays in Honor of J.M. Rogers. 21. Brill.
- Runciman, Steven (1952). A History of the Crusades, Volume II: The Kingdom of Jerusalem and the Frankish East. Cambridge: Cambridge University Press.
- Tyerman, Christopher (2006). God's War: A New History of the Crusades. Harvard University Press. ISBN 978-0674023871.
- William of Tyre, A History of Deeds Done Beyond the Sea, trans. E.A. Babcock and A.C. Krey. Columbia University Press, 1943.

== Bibliography ==
- Gabrieli, Francesco (1984), Arab Historians of the Crusades, Berkeley: University of California Press, ISBN 978-0520052246.
- Murray, Alan V. (2015), The Crusades to the Holy Land: The Essential Reference Guide, ABC-CLIO, ISBN 978-1610697804.

Regnal titles
Preceded by Zengi	Emir of Aleppo; 1146–1174	Succeeded by As-Salih Ismail al-Malik
Preceded by Mujir ad-Din	Emir of Damascus; 1154–1174	Succeeded by As-Salih Ismail al-Malik
