= Ibn al-Qalanisi =

Arab historian (1073–1160)

- ابن القلانسي
- Born: Abu Ya'la Hamzah ibn al-Asad ibn al-Qalanisi ابو يعلى حمزة ابن الاسد ابن القلانسي; 1071; Damascus
- Died: 1160 (aged 88–89); Damascus
- Years active: 1071-1160

Abū Yaʿlā Ḥamzah ibn al-Asad ibn al-Qalānisī (Arabic: ابو يعلى حمزة ابن الاسد ابن القلانسي; c. 1071 – 18 March 1160) was an Arab politician and chronicler in 12th-century Damascus.

== Biography ==
Hamza, whose kunya was Abū Yaʿlà and nisba was al-Qalānisī 'the Hatter', descended from the Banu Tamim, and was among the well-educated nobility of the city of Damascus. He studied literature, theology, and fiqh and served firstly as a secretary in, and later the head of, the Chancery of Damascus. He served twice as raʾīs of the city, an office equivalent to mayor.

== "Chronicle of Damascus" ==
His chronicle, the Dhail Taʼrīkh Dimashq or Mudhayyal Taʼrīkh Dimashq 'Continuation of the Chronicle of Damascus' was an extension of the chronicle of Hilal al-Sabi', covering the years 1056 to al-Qalanisi's death in 1160. This chronicle is one of the few contemporary accounts of the First Crusade and its immediate aftermath from the Muslim perspective, making it not only a valuable source for modern historians, but also for later 12th-century chronicles, including ibn al-Athir. He also witnessed the siege of Damascus in 1148 during the Second Crusade, which ended in a decisive crusader defeat.

The entire material of his chronicle covers the time span of two generations, his father's and his own, al-Qalanisi having experienced the First Crusade at a mature age, although apparently not as a fighter.. His chronicle was written as an sequel to earlier chronicles written by Hilal ibn al-Muhassin al-Sabi and Thabit ibn Sinan, and his chronicle also portrays the rivalries among Turks, Ismailis, and Arabs. Analysing the text, H. A. R. Gibb, his first English translator, reaches the conclusion that al-Qalanisi has extracted his information both from eyewitnesses and documents, a fact strengthened by al-Qalanisi's own description of his modus operandi. As a result of al-Qalanisi's careful work, a chief quality noted by Gibb is the accuracy of the chronology of events, for which he even offers the day of the week. Gibb extracted from the chronicle and translated into English the material covering the period 1097–1159, which he published in 1932.

== Sources ==
- Ibn al-Qalanisi; Gibb, H. A. R. (transl., ed.) (2002) [1932]. The Damascus Chronicle of the Crusades: Extracted and translated from the chronicle of Ibn Al-Qalanisi. Mineola, NY: Dover Publications. Unabridged reprint of first edition, London: Luzac (1932). ISBN 978-0-486-42519-1.
- Christie, Niall (2006). "Ibn al-Qalanisi (d. 1116)". In Murray, Alan V. (ed.). The Crusades: An Encyclopedia. Santa Barbara: ABC-CLIO. p. 626. ISBN 9781576078624.
