= Citadel of Damascus =

Castle in Damascus, Syria

- قلعة دمشق
- Damascus, Syria
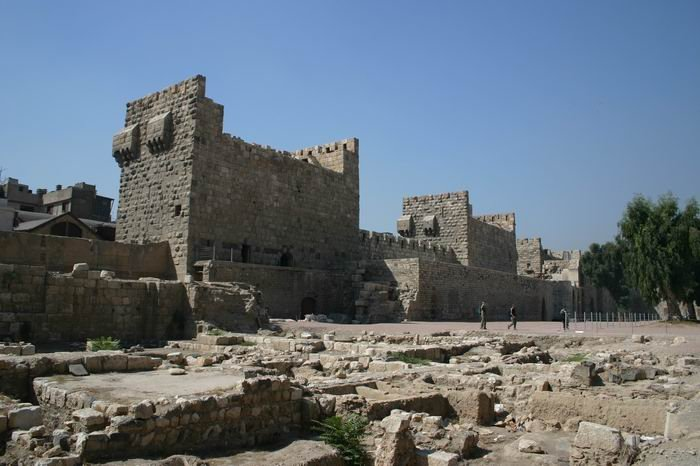
- Courtyard and south wall of the Citadel of Damascus

Site information
- Type: Castle
- Owner: Directorate-General of Antiquities and Museums (DGAM)
- Controlled by: Atsiz bin Uvak (1076–1078); Seljuq dynasty (1078–1104); Burid dynasty (1104–1154); Zengid dynasty (1154–1174); Ayyubid dynasty (1174–1260 – current building); Mamluk Sultanate (1260–1516); Ottoman Empire (1516–1918); French Mandate of Syria (1920–1946); Syrian Republic (1946–1958); United Arab Republic (1958–1961); Syrian Arab Republic (1961–2024); Syrian transitional government (2024–present)
- Open to the public: Yes
- Condition: Partially ruined

Location
- Coordinates: 33.511667°N 36.301944°E

Site history
- Built: 1076–1078; 1203–1216 (current building)
- Built by: Atsiz bin Uvak; Al-Adil I (current building)
- In use: Until 1986
- Materials: Carbonate rock, basalt
- Battles/wars: Siege of Damascus (1148); Siege by Kitbuqa (1260); Siege by Timur (1401)

Garrison information
- Past commanders: Nur ad-Din Zangi; Saladin; Al-Adil I Baibars
- Designations

UNESCO World Heritage Site
- Official name: Ancient City of Damascus
- Type: Cultural
- Criteria: i, ii, iii, iv, vi
- Designated: 1979 (3rd session)
- Reference no.: 20
- Region: Arab States

The Citadel of Damascus (Arabic: قلعة دمشق, romanized: Qalʿat Dimašq) is an Ayyubid-era medieval fortified palace and citadel in Damascus, Syria. It is part of the Ancient City of Damascus, which was listed as a UNESCO World Heritage Site in 1979.

The location of the current citadel was first fortified in 1076 by the Turkman warlord Atsiz bin Uvak, although it is possible but not proven that a citadel stood on this place in the Hellenistic and Roman periods. After the assassination of Atsiz bin Uvak, the project was finished by the Seljuq ruler Tutush I. The emirs of the subsequent Burid and Zengid dynasties carried out modifications and added new structures to it. During this period, the citadel and the city were besieged several times by Crusader and Muslim armies. In 1174, the citadel was captured by Saladin, the Ayyubid sultan of Egypt, who made it his residence and had the defences and residential buildings modified.

Saladin's brother Al-Adil rebuilt the citadel completely between 1203 and 1216 in response to the development of the counterweight trebuchet. After his death, power struggles broke out between the other Ayyubid princes and although Damascus switched hands several times, the citadel was taken by force only once, in 1239. The citadel remained in Ayyubid hands until the Mongols under their general Kitbuqa captured Damascus in 1260, thereby ending Ayyubid rule in Syria. After an unsuccessful revolt broke out in the citadel, the Mongols had most of it dismantled. After the defeat of the Mongols in 1260 by the Mamluks, who had succeeded the Ayyubids as rulers of Egypt, Damascus came under Mamluk rule. Except for brief periods in 1300 and 1401, when the Mongols conquered Damascus, the Mamluks controlled the citadel until 1516. In that year, Syria fell into the hands of the Ottoman Empire. Damascus surrendered without a fight and from the 17th century onward the citadel functioned as barracks for the Janissaries—Ottoman infantry units. The citadel started to fall into disrepair in the 19th century and its last military use was in 1925, when French soldiers shelled the old city from the citadel in response to the Great Syrian Revolt against the French Mandate of Syria. The citadel continued to serve as a barracks and prison until 1986, when excavations and restorations started. As of 2011, excavation and restoration efforts are still ongoing.

The citadel is located in the northwest corner of the city walls, between the Bab al-Faradis and the Bab al-Jabiyah. The citadel consists of a more or less rectangular curtain wall enclosing an area of 230 by 150 metres (750 by 490 ft). The walls were originally protected by 14 massive towers, but today only 12 remain. The citadel has gates on its northern, western and eastern flanks. The current citadel dates primarily to the Ayyubid period while incorporating parts of the older Seljuq fortress. Extensive repairs in response to sieges and earthquakes were carried out in the Mamluk and Ottoman periods.

== Before the citadel ==
It is uncertain whether a building stood on the site of the citadel before the 11th century AD. The Ghouta, the wider area in which Damascus is located, has been occupied since at least 9000 BC, but there is no evidence for settlement within the area that is today enclosed by the city walls before the 1st millennium BC. The area occupied by the later citadel was most likely outside this first settlement. The presence of a citadel during the Hellenistic period is uncertain. Damascus certainly had a citadel during the Roman period, but whether it was located on the site of the present citadel is uncertain and subject to scholarly debate.

== Old citadel ==
=== Construction of the old citadel ===
In 1076, Damascus was conquered by the Turkman warlord Atsiz ibn Uwaq, who established himself as the ruler of the city and began the construction of the citadel. He then tried to invade the Fatimid Caliphate in Egypt but was defeated in 1077. The Fatimids subsequently built on their victory over Atsiz and besieged Damascus in 1077 and again in 1078, but both attempts to take the city were unsuccessful. The siege of 1078 was eventually lifted by Tutush I, brother of the Seljuq sultan Malik Shah I, to whom Atsiz had appealed for help. After the Fatimid besiegers had left, Tutush I took over the city and, distrusting Atsiz, had him assassinated in 1078. The construction of the citadel was finished under Tutush I.

=== From Seljuqs to Zengids ===
After the death of Tutush I in 1095, Syria was divided between his sons Abu Nasr Shams al-Muluk Duqaq and Fakhr al-Mulk Radwan. Duqaq took control of Damascus while Radwan established himself as ruler of Aleppo. During Duqaq's reign (1095–1104), additional work was carried out on the citadel. In 1096, Radwan besieged the citadel but failed to capture it.

During the rule of the Burid dynasty (1104–1154), work was carried out on the citadel in response to multiple attacks on Damascus by Crusader and Muslim armies. In 1126, a Crusader army approached Damascus, but their advance was stopped 30 kilometres (19 mi) from the city. A second attempt by Crusaders in 1129 advanced to within 10 kilometres (6.2 mi) of the city before they had to retreat. Crusader incursions prompted some improvements to the castle in the 1130s by Burid rulers, Taj al-Muluk Buri and Shams al-Mulk Isma'il.

Zengi, the atabeg of Aleppo and Mosul, attacked Damascus in 1135 and again in 1140. Zengi's second attack was thwarted because Damascus forged a coalition with the Crusader states to the south, arguing that if Damascus were conquered, these states would fall as well. Crusader armies attacked Damascus a third time in 1148 during the Second Crusade. This siege of Damascus ended within a week when an army led by Nur ad-Din Zangi, ruler of Aleppo and the son of Zengi, threatened the besieging Crusaders, forcing them to withdraw. After unsuccessful attacks in 1150 and 1151, Nur ad-Din finally captured Damascus in 1154. The citadel was only surrendered to Nur ad-Din after Mujir ad-Din Abaq, the last Burid ruler, had been given safe passage and lordship over the city of Homs.

Nur ad-Din ruled as Zengid emir of Damascus from 1154 until his death in 1174. He took up residence in the citadel and rebuilt or refurbished its residential structures. After an earthquake hit Damascus in 1170, Nur ad-Din built a wooden house for sleeping and prayer next to the original stone residence of the citadel. In addition, he built a mosque and a fountain in the citadel. Between 1165 and 1174, Nur ad-Din re-fortified Damascus with a concentric wall, and it is possible that he also strengthened the defences of the citadel. Nur ad-Din died of an illness in the citadel on 15 May 1174 and was buried there; his body was later transferred to the Nur ad-Din Madrasah in Damascus.

=== Saladin to Al-Adil ===
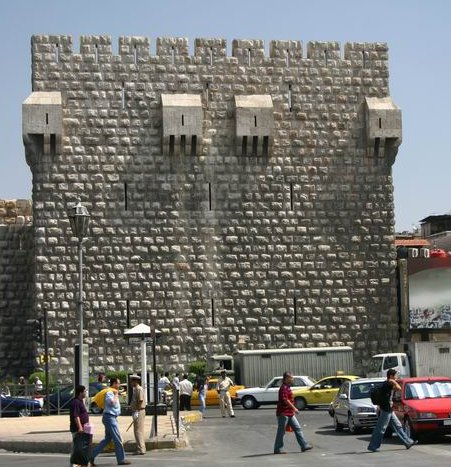
One of the bastions of the Citadel of Damascus protected by multiple bretèches

Immediately following Nur ad-Din's death in 1174, Damascus was seized by Saladin, the Ayyubid sultan of Egypt. In that year, Saladin rode from Egypt past the Crusader states to Damascus with only 700 horsemen. The city opened its gates to Saladin without resistance, except for the citadel, which surrendered to him later that year. Saladin added a tower to the citadel and refurbished the residential buildings. Like his predecessor Nur ad-Din, Saladin died of an illness in the citadel on 4 March 1193. He was initially buried inside the citadel, but later reburied in a mausoleum near the Umayyad Mosque in Damascus.

At Saladin's death in 1193, rival Ayyubid factions led by Saladin's sons established themselves in Egypt, Aleppo, Damascus, and Iraq. Al-Afdal, Saladin's eldest son and emir of Damascus, was initially recognized by the younger sons as their overlord. However, hostilities broke out in 1194 between Al-Afdal and Al-Aziz Uthman, Saladin's second-oldest son and Ayyubid sultan of Egypt. In 1196, Al-Aziz and Saladin's brother Al-Adil captured Damascus, except for the citadel, where Al-Afdal had taken refuge. After negotiations, Al-Afdal surrendered the citadel and his titles to Al-Aziz and was exiled to Salkhad in the Hauran. Al-Adil recognized the overlordship of Al-Aziz and became ruler of Damascus. At the death of Al-Aziz in 1198, several members of Saladin's family, including Al-Afdal and Az-Zahir Ghazi, ruler of Aleppo, allied themselves against Al-Adil and marched on Damascus. Al-Afdal and Az-Zahir besieged Damascus in 1200 and 1201, but both attempts were unsuccessful. Al-Adil eventually negotiated a peace with Al-Afdal and Az-Zahir, who recognized Al-Adil's suzerainty as sultan of Egypt and emir of Damascus.

== New citadel ==
=== Construction by Al-Adil and dismantling by the Mongols ===
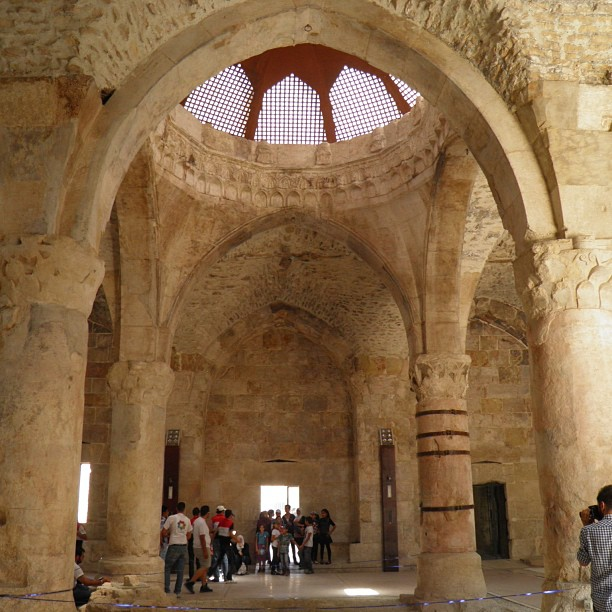
The so-called "throne room" built by the Ayyubid emir Al-Adil

After his position as sultan of Egypt and emir of Damascus was secured, Al-Adil started an extensive rebuilding programme of the citadel. Between 1203 and 1216, the old fortifications were razed and a larger castle was built at the same location, incorporating parts of the old Seljuq citadel. The lower Ayyubid princes were each required to finance and build one of the large towers of the citadel. Several of Al-Adil's Ayyubid successors rebuilt many of the administrative and domestic structures inside the citadel, including residences, palaces, and a pool. As-Salih Ayyub was the only successor who also modified the defences.

Possible motivations for this complete rebuilding by Al-Adil include the damage the old citadel may have sustained from earthquakes in 1200 and 1201 and the threat that other Ayyubid princes continued to pose toward Al-Adil. The most likely motivation is that the defences of the old citadel became obsolete due to the introduction in the 12th century of the counterweight trebuchet, a siege engine easily capable of reducing thick stone walls to rubble. The new citadel introduced a number of important changes to the defensive system, including higher and thicker walls, a wide moat surrounding the citadel, and numerous closely spaced, high, massive towers. Unlike the older towers, these were square rather than round in design. The towers contained platforms on which trebuchets could be placed. Due to their high position, these trebuchets could outrange enemy artillery and thereby prevent them from breaching the walls.

After Al-Adil's death in 1218, intense power struggles broke out among his sons and other Ayyubid princes. Between 1229 and 1246, Damascus switched hands regularly and was attacked five times by different Ayyubid armies. During this period, the citadel was only once taken by force—through mining of one of its walls—in 1239. This occurred when the citadel's garrison had been reduced to below the number needed to defend a castle of that size. Following the murder in 1250 of Al-Muazzam Turanshah, the last Ayyubid sultan of Egypt, Damascus was seized by the Ayyubid ruler of Aleppo, An-Nasir Yusuf. He was in control of most of Syria until the arrival of the Mongols.

When the Mongols invaded Syria and threatened Damascus after conquering Aleppo in 1260, An-Nasir fled from Damascus, leaving the city virtually undefended. The notables of Damascus started negotiations with the Mongol ruler Hulagu Khan; the city was handed over to his general Kitbuqa in 1260. When the Mongol army left Damascus to quell rebellions in the countryside, the Ayyubid garrison of the citadel revolted, as they had been instructed to do by An-Nasir. In response, the Mongols besieged the citadel in 1260. The garrison surrendered after heavy bombardments and without hope of being relieved by An-Nasir. The defences of the citadel were then largely dismantled.

=== Mamluk period ===
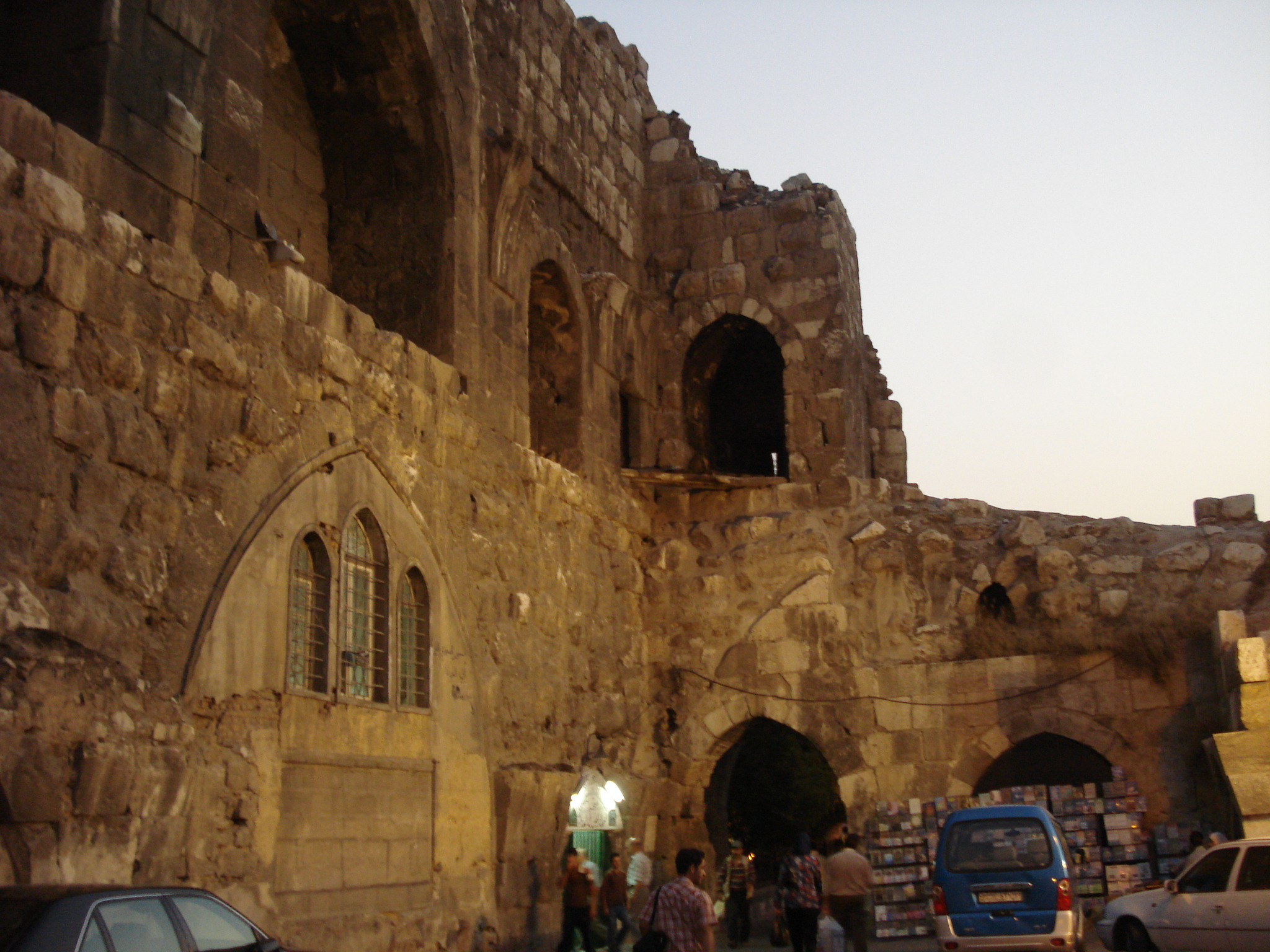
Street along the northern wall of the citadel, the gate in the background was once part of the northern gate of the citadel

The new Mamluk sultan of Egypt, Qutuz, defeated the Mongols in the Battle of Ain Jalut in 1260. Damascus now came under Mamluk influence. In the same year, Qutuz was assassinated by his commander Baibars, who succeeded Qutuz as sultan of Egypt (1260–1277). During Baibars' reign, the citadel was rebuilt and the northern wall was moved 10 metres (33 ft) to the north. More rebuilding was completed during the reigns of the sultan Qalawun (1279–1290) and Al-Ashraf Khalil. The latter had a structure called the Blue Dome built in the citadel. It was the first dome in Syria that was decorated with coloured tiles on the outer surface, a tradition imported from Iran. Following the Mamluk defeat in the Battle of Wadi al-Khazandar, Damascus, except for the citadel, changed hands to the Mongols in 1300. The Mongols besieged the citadel and set up a trebuchet in the court of the Umayyad Mosque, but they withdrew from Damascus before the citadel could be taken. In the following decades, extensive reconstruction work took place on the citadel. The damage done to the citadel during the siege, primarily on its east side, was repaired. The mosque was reconstructed and enlarged, the towers were repaired, and the Blue Dome was covered with lead plates as the tiles themselves had been destroyed.

During the last two decades of the 14th century, a civil war raged in the Mamluk sultanate between Sultan Barquq, who had established the Burji dynasty in Cairo, on one side and on the other side Saif al-Din Yalbugha, governor of Aleppo, and Mintash, governor of Malatya. The city and the citadel were besieged several times during this period. During these sieges, both sides made use of siege towers, trebuchets, rockets and cannons. After Yalbugha switched sides and teamed up with Barquq, Mintash was killed in 1393, leaving Damascus and its city under the control of Barquq. Also during this time, the Zahiri Revolt, a conspiracy to overthrow Barquq, was discovered at the Citadel.

=== Siege by Timur and its aftermath ===
In 1400, the Mongol army under Timur, better known as Tamerlane, swept down on Syria and arrived at Damascus after having subdued Aleppo, Hama, and Baalbek. A Mamluk army from Egypt under Sultan Faraj ibn Barquq, the son of Barquq, failed to lift the siege. In 1401, the city surrendered to Timur, except for the citadel, which Timur besieged. Towers with trebuchets were set up around the citadel and in the Umayyad Mosque. The garrison surrendered after the northwestern tower was brought down through mining. The defenders were slaughtered and a heavy tribute was imposed on the citizens of Damascus. When they failed to deliver, the city was sacked and the Umayyad Mosque was burned.

The damage to the citadel, especially to its northern and western walls, was only repaired in 1407. In 1414, governor of Damascus Nawruz al-Hafizi, sought refuge in the citadel against the army of Sultan Al-Mu'ayyad Shaykh. The citadel was bombarded by trebuchet and cannon. The siege ended when a treaty of surrender was signed. In 1461, the southwest tower collapsed in a fire when missiles were fired from it to force the rebellious governor of Damascus to leave the city. This tower and four others were rebuilt in the late 15th and early 16th centuries, indicating that the repairs of 1407 had been carried out in haste.

=== Ottoman period ===
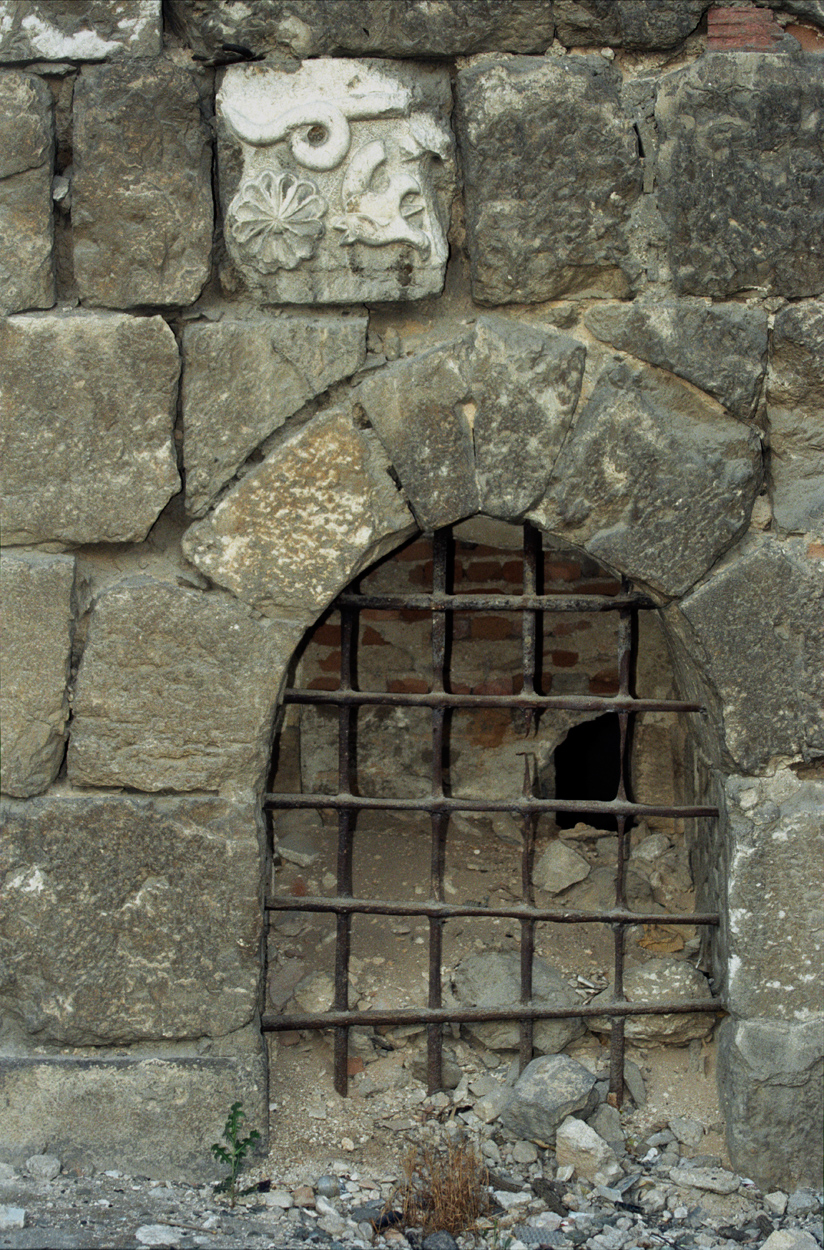
Detail of a wall showing a small gate and spolia

After the Mamluk defeat by the Ottoman army under Sultan Selim I in the Battle of Marj Dabiq in 1516, Damascus and the citadel surrendered peacefully to the Ottomans. Damascus was given to Janbirdi al-Ghazali, a Mamluk who had submitted to Selim I. When Selim I died in 1520, al-Ghazali revolted and took the citadel. He marched upon Aleppo to expand his realm, but had to retreat and was eventually defeated and killed in the vicinity of Damascus in 1521. Damascus again changed hands, to the Ottomans. From 1658 onward, the citadel was controlled by the Janissaries—Ottoman infantry units. In 1738 and in 1746, they were involved in conflicts with the governors of Damascus; the Janissaries temporarily lost control of the citadel in 1746. The north gate of the citadel collapsed in 1752, and sustained heavy damage due to a severe earthquake in 1759. According to contemporary accounts, both the western and southern walls collapsed, but the damage was quickly repaired in 1761.

When Ali Bey of Egypt, who opposed Ottoman overlordship, invaded Syria in 1771, the city of Damascus surrendered to him without a fight, except for the citadel. Ali Bey withdrew after a short siege. Two further sieges took place in 1787 and 1812, both successful and both initiated because the citadel's garrison had revolted against the governor of Damascus. The last siege of the citadel took place in 1831. In that year, the citizens of Damascus and the local garrison of Janissaries revolted against governor Mehmed Selim Pasha, who took refuge in the citadel. He was promised safe passage after a siege lasting 40 days but was murdered before he could leave the city. In 1860, Christian refugees from the Druze–Maronite conflict in Lebanon spilled into Damascus, resulting in tensions with the Muslim population. There was a massacre of the Christian population, many of whom sought refuge in the citadel and eventually fled the city with the help of the Algerian–Damascene notable Abd al-Qadir al-Jaza'iri. Descriptions and photographs of the citadel by nineteenth-century European travellers indicate that the defences remained in relatively good shape until 1895, but that the structures inside the walls were reduced to complete ruins. In 1895, substantial damage was done to the citadel because it was quarried for stone to build barracks.

=== World War I and the French Mandate period ===
When the British and Arab forces marched on Damascus in the final year of the Sinai and Palestine Campaign in World War I, the Ottoman authorities fled and left Damascus in the control of a committee of citizens. The newly appointed Ottoman military governor released 4,000 prisoners from the citadel, who subsequently started pillaging and killing sick and disabled Ottoman soldiers who had been left behind in the city. These riots only stopped with the entrance into the city of the Australian Light Horse troops on 1 October 1918.

French military forces occupied the citadel during the French Mandate period in Syria (1920–1946). During the Great Syrian Revolt in 1925, the French shelled Al-Hariqa, the area immediately south of the citadel—where Syrian rebels were supposed to be present—from positions in the hills to the north of the city, and from the citadel itself. This bombardment resulted in widespread destruction. After the French Mandate period, the citadel continued to serve as a prison and barracks until 1986.

=== Restoration and research ===
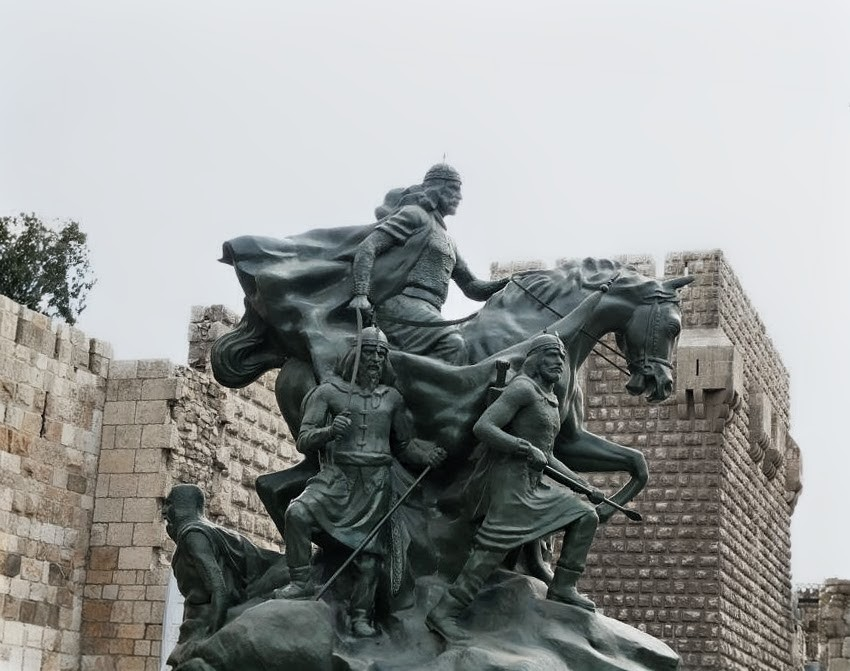
Saladin statue in front of the citadel

The Ancient City of Damascus, including the citadel, was listed as a UNESCO World Heritage Site in 1979. Since 1986 restoration works have been carried out by various Syrian and foreign missions with the aim of opening the citadel to the public. Until 1999, the restorations were carried out by the Syrian Directorate-General of Antiquities and Museums (DGAM). In 1999 a joint French-Syrian mission was initiated under the supervision of the DGAM and the Institut français du Proche-Orient (IFPO). Between 2000 and 2006, this mission carried out extensive archaeological and art-historical research in the citadel, as well as further restoration works. In celebration of these restorations, a ceremony was held on 1 July 2006 which was attended by Syrian President Bashar al-Assad.

In 2004 an agreement was signed between the DGAM and the Italian General Direction for Development Cooperation for a joint mission to renovate and reorganize the citadel and the National Museum of Damascus. This mission started working in the citadel in 2007. Much attention will be given to the reinforcement of damaged or structurally weak parts in the architecture. It is expected by the Syrian–Italian mission that, once renovations are finished, the citadel will be used for cultural and social events and activities.

== Citadel today ==
=== Location and layout ===
The citadel is located in the northwest corner of the old walled city of Damascus, between the Bab al-Faradis and the Bab al-Jabiyah. Whereas most medieval Arabic castles are located on prominent hilltops, the citadel of Damascus was built on flat ground at the same level as the rest of the city, a feature it shares with the Citadel of Bosra. The location of the citadel ensured that it could control the Barada River, which flows north of the citadel. The location of the river also offered protection against attack from that side of the citadel. The Nahr Aqrabani, a canal branching off the Barada, flowed immediately below the northern wall and provided additional protection. The dry moats on the other sides of the citadel could be filled from these streams. Another branch of the Barada, the Nahr Banyas, entered the city under the citadel. Hydraulic structures below that made control of the flow of water into Damascus possible from within the citadel were probably constructed under Al-Adil. The citadel was fully integrated into the defences of Damascus, with the city walls abutting the citadel on its southwest and northeast corners.

The citadel erected under the Seljuqs occupied an area measuring 210 by 130 metres (690 by 430 ft). Parts of the Seljuq walls were integrated in the rebuilding undertaken by Al-Adil. In this way, a second inner ring of defence was provided, as Al-Adil's walls enclosed a slightly larger area. The Ayyubid citadel encloses an uneven rectangular area of 230 by 150 metres (750 by 490 ft). The outer walls, constructed by Al-Adil, were pierced by three gates and originally protected by 14 towers, although only 12 of these remain. Except for the western part of the curtain wall, the defensive works of the citadel that are still standing are primarily of Ayyubid date, with extensive Mamluk restorations. The walls are partly obscured from sight by the urban fabric of Damascus, which has encroached upon the citadel during the 19th and 20th centuries. The shops along the north side of the Al-Hamidiyah Souq are built against the citadel's southern façade, while parts of the eastern defences are also obscured by buildings. The buildings that stood against the western and northern walls were cleared in the 1980s.

The walls and towers of the citadel are constructed from carbonate rocks and basalt that were quarried in the vicinity of Damascus.

=== Towers ===
Today, the citadel has 12 towers. There is one tower on each corner, three in between along the north and south walls and two facing east. Originally, the citadel had two more towers on the western wall, as reported by European travellers until 1759. The earthquake that hit Damascus in that year led to the collapse of the western defences of the citadel, with the western towers not being rebuilt afterwards. The central northern tower, which once housed the north gate of the citadel, and the southwest corner tower have also largely disappeared. Of the former, only the west wall remains while of the southwest tower only parts of the basement can still be seen. The other 10 towers have been preserved up to their original height, which ranges between 15 and 25 metres (49 and 82 ft). The northern corner towers are square while the southern ones are L-shaped. All the other towers are rectangular with their broad sides parallel to the walls of the citadel. All towers are crowned by a double parapet equipped with machicolations and numerous arrowslits. These parapets surrounded and thereby protected the large platforms from which trebuchets were operated.

=== Curtain walls ===
The curtain walls of the citadel connect the towers with each other. Given that during the design of the citadel so much emphasis was placed on the massive towers, the curtain walls are relatively short. They range between 10 metres (33 ft) in length for the curtain wall that connects the two central towers of the east wall to 43 metres (141 ft) for the curtain wall connecting the northwest corner tower with the next tower east of it. Where the walls are preserved up to their original height, which is on the south side of the citadel, they measure 11.5 metres (38 ft), while their thickness ranges between 3.65–4.90 metres (12.0–16.1 ft). Along the inside of the curtain walls ran vaulted galleries that allowed quick access to all parts of the citadel. These galleries had arrowslits from which an approaching enemy could be shot. The walls were crowned by a walkway that was protected by crenellations.

=== Gates ===
The citadel's three gates are located on the north, east and west sides of the citadel. The first two are the work of Al-Adil, although the northern gate has been repaired in the Mamluk period, while the current west gate is of later date. The northern gate was primarily reserved for military matters; the eastern gate was in civic use. During the Mamluk period, the eastern gate was one of two locations, the other being the Umayyad Mosque, where official decrees were posted, and this is reflected in a number of inscriptions that have been found here.

The northern gate, or Bab al-Hadid ("Iron Gate"), was built with a primary emphasis on military matters. It originally consisted of arched entrances in the east and west walls of a tower in the middle of the northern curtain wall. These entrances led to a central vaulted room and from there through a long vaulted passage before reaching the courtyard. This large gate complex also incorporated the gate structures of the old Seljuq citadel. Based on stylistic evidence and inscriptions found in the citadel, the original construction of the Ayyubid gate can be dated to the period between 1210 and 1212. Most of the outer gate tower has disappeared and a street now runs through the western arch that still survives, while the vaulted passage that led into the citadel is now used as a mosque. The east and north gate complexes were connected through a 68 metres (223 ft) long vaulted passage that can also be dated to the reign of Al-Adil.

The eastern gate, constructed between 1213 and 1215, is the only one that opens toward the area enclosed by the city walls of Damascus. It is located in one of the citadel's square towers and protected by another tower immediately south of the gate tower and a barbacan running between these towers. It is a bent-axis gate running through vaulted passages before reaching the courtyard. Behind it is a square hall in which four columns support a central unusually shaped dome. It incorporates a gate tower from the old Seljuq citadel. The gate lacks defensive structures like murder-holes and is more decorated than the northern gate, which must be related to the fact that the gate faces the city. The gate is decorated with a superb muqarnas canopy that is now hidden because the outer door is blocked.

The western gate was originally protected by two square towers that were probably built during the reign of Baibars. After the 1759 earthquake, which led to the collapse of the western defences of the citadel, these towers were not rebuilt. Unlike the other two gates, this gate has a straight passage.

=== Southwest building ===
In the southwest corner of the courtyard, built parallel to the southern wall, is a two-storey building measuring 90 by 10 metres (295 by 33 ft) and reaching a height of 16 metres (52 ft). The date of this building has long been unclear, but based on the archaeological and architectural analysis carried out between 2002 and 2006, it has been shown that it predates Al-Adil's refortification of the citadel and must have been an addition to the defences of the Seljuq citadel. The function of this building after it was incorporated into Al-Adil's new walls, and thus after losing its defensive function, remains unclear as the archaeological analysis did not reveal any in situ material from which the building's use could be reconstructed.

== See also ==
- List of castles in Syria
- Areimeh Castle
- Shayzar Castle

== Bibliography ==
- Adorni, Elisa; Venturelli, Giampiero (2010), "Mortars and Stones of the Damascus Citadel (Syria)", International Journal of Architectural Heritage, 4 (4): 337–350, doi:10.1080/15583050903121851, S2CID 95733766
- Allen, Terry (1999), Ayyubid Architecture, Occidental: Solipsist Press, ISBN 0-944940-02-1
- Berthier, Sophie (2006), "La Citadelle de Damas: les apports d'une étude archéologique", in Kennedy, Hugh (ed.), Muslim Military Architecture in Greater Syria: From the Coming of Islam to the Ottoman Period, History of Warfare (in French), vol. 35, Leiden: Brill, pp. 151–164, ISBN 90-04-14713-6
- Burns, Ross (2005), Damascus: A History, Milton Park: Routledge, ISBN 0-415-27105-3
- Chevedden, Paul (1986), The Citadel of Damascus, Ann Arbor: U.M.I. Dissertation Information Service, OCLC 640193186
- Gabrieli, Francesco (1984), Arab Historians of the Crusades, Berkeley: University of California Press, ISBN 978-0-520-05224-6
- Hanisch, Hanspeter (1996), Die ayyūbidischen Toranlangen der Zitadelle von Damaskus. Ein Beitrag zur Kenntnis des mittelalterlichen Festungsbauwesen in Syrien (in German), Wiesbaden: Ludwig Reichert, ISBN 3-88226-886-7
- Hillenbrand, Carole (2000), The Crusades: Islamic Perspectives, New York: Routledge, ISBN 978-0-415-92914-1
- Hillenbrand, Carole (2001), "The Career of Zengi", in Phillips, Jonathan; Hoch, Martin (eds.), The Second Crusade: Scope and Consequences, Manchester: Manchester University Press, pp. 111–132, ISBN 978-0-7190-5711-3
- Humphreys, R. Stephen (1977), From Saladin to the Mongols: The Ayyubids of Damascus, 1193–1260, Albany: SUNY Press, ISBN 978-0-87395-263-7
- Kedourie, Elie (1964), "The Capture of Damascus, 1 October 1918", Middle Eastern Studies, 1 (1): 66–83, doi:10.1080/00263206408700005
- Lane-Poole, Stanley (1901), A History of Egypt in the Middle Ages, New York: Charles Scribner's, OCLC 455336208
- Lane-Poole, Stanley (1906), Saladin and the Fall of the Kingdom of Jerusalem, London: G.P. Putnam's, OCLC 448994737
- Nicolle, David (2009), The Second Crusade 1148: Disaster Outside Damascus, Oxford: Osprey, ISBN 978-1-84603-354-4
- Phillips, Jonathan (2001), "The Latin East 1098–1291", in Riley-Smith, Jonathan (ed.), The Oxford Illustrated History of the Crusades, Oxford: Oxford University Press, pp. 112–140, ISBN 978-0-19-285428-5
- Runciman, Steven (1987), A History of the Crusades: The Kingdom of Acre and the later Crusades, Cambridge: Cambridge University Press, ISBN 978-0-521-34772-3
- Wright, Quincy (1926), "The Bombardment of Damascus", American Journal of International Law, 20 (2): 263–280, doi:10.2307/2188917, JSTOR 2188917, S2CID 147129628
