= Bazawash =

Mamluk military commander (died 1138)

Bazawash (d. 1138), also known as Bazwāj and Beza-Uch. Mameluk military commander at Damascus through 1138. Bazawash led a regiment at Baalbek who murdered Yusuf ibn Firuz in 1136, and was then made chief minister by Shihab ed-Din Mahmud, atabeg of Damascus. Spurred on by Zengi’s successes, Bazawash invaded Tripoli in 1137, routing the local Frankish forces. Pons of Tripoli, taking refuge in the Castle of Saint-Gilles, was captured and put to death. Zengi was not happy with Bazawash’s passiveness, causing him to attack Homs, then under Unur. Approached by a Frankish army from Tripoli, Zengi withdrew from Homs and attacked the Franks under Fulk. Fulk fled into Montferrand, to be rescued by a force led by Patriarch William of Malines. Following their withdrawal, Bazawash ravaged as far south as Nablus, killing most of its inhabitants. He was close to Zumurrad, widow of Buri, being the messenger to Zengi of her refusal of marriage. Bazawash was assassinated in 1138, and Zengi and Zumurrad were married the next month.
