= Tutush II =

Emir of Damascus
- Reign: 1104
- Predecessor: Duqaq
- Successor: Irtash
- Atabeg: Toghtekin
- Born: c. 1103
- Died: 1104/05 (aged 3 – 4)
- Father: Duqaq

Tutush Ibn Duqaq Ibn Tutush Seljuki (Arabic: تتش بن دقاق بن تتش السلجوقي), commonly known as Tutush II, was an infant Emir of Damascus.

== Overview ==
Tutush II was son of Duqaq, who reigned Damascus during first crusade. After the death of Daqqaq in 6 June 1104, Toghtekin carried out his will by taking over the governorship of Damascus after him and providing custody of his young son, Tutush ibn Duqaq, until he grew up and raising him well. However, the little boy died in the first half of the year 498 AH (1104 AD), so Toghtekin then assumed power and established the Burid family, which would rule Damascus for next half century.

Irtash briefly replaced his one-year-old nephew, Tutush II, as ruler of Damascus. Irtash ibn Tutash refused Toghtekin to agree to hand over power to his nephew Tutush ibn Duqaq as a child, so this prompted him to go to the Franks and live with them. Three months after his appointment as ruler, Toghtekin overthrew Tutush II, and was restored to power again, but he soon died. Thereafter, Toghtekin recognized the suzerainty of Ridwan, Sultan of Aleppo, but retained effective authority over the Emirate of Damascus, establishing the Burid dynasty.

== See also ==
- Fakhr al-Mulk Ridwan
