= Jamal al-Din Muhammad =

Burid ruler of Damascus

Atabeg of Damascus
- Reign: 1139–1140
- Predecessor: Shihab al-Din Mahmud
- Successor: Mujir al-Din Abaq
- Died: 1140
- House: Burid Family
- Father: Taj al-Muluk Buri

Jamal al-Din Muhammad was a Burid atabeg of Damascus from 1139 to 1140. He was the last son of Taj al-Muluk Buri, emir of Damascus.

== Biography ==
On the night of June 22 or 23, 1139, the then atabeg of Damascus Shihab al-Din Mahmud was assassinated by three of his pages. Minister Mu'in al-Din Unur then took matters in hand energetically, had the assassins crucified and brought Prince Jamal al-Din Muhammad, half-brother of the deceased atabeg and emir of Baalbek, to Damascus to do so. recognize atabeg by the population. In the meantime, the mother of Mahmud, since remarried in Zengi, called her husband for help, who ran hoping to seize Damascus, but the dispositions of Mu'in al-Din Unur took him by surprise, and he can only lay siege to Baalbek on August 20, 1139. The citadel resists so well that, when the garrison surrenders, on October 21, Zengi orders the soldiers to be crucified despite his oaths to spare them, hoping to frighten the Damascenes, but it only strengthens the determination of the population around its leaders.

Zengi then changed tactics and offered the young atabeg the exchange of Damascus for a minor fief, but Mu'in al-Din Unur took it upon himself to decline the offer. Zengi established his camp near Damascus on December 6, 1139, and following a success against the Damascene troops on December 21 again proposed the exchange of Damascus for Homs or Baalbek, a proposal that the young atabeg thought he would accept, but Unur takes it upon himself to dissuade him, citing Zengi's disloyalty. Muhammad died on March 29, 1140, and his son Mujir al-Din Abaq, still a child, succeeded him, under the regency of Mu'in al-Din Unur. Zengi still besieged Damascus, but Unur then appealed to Fulk of Anjou, and Zengi lifted the siege on May 4, preferring retreat to confrontation.

Regnal titles
| Preceded by Shihab al-Din Mahmud | Atabeg of Damascus; 1139–1140 | Succeeded by Mujir al-Din Abaq |
