= Philippe Stern (businessman) =

Swiss businessman (1938–2026)

Philippe Stern (10 November 1938 – 14 June 2026) was a Swiss businessman. He was the president of Patek Philippe from 1977 to 2009.

== Biography ==
Philippe Stern was born on 10 November 1938 in Switzerland. The son of Henri Stern, he joined Patek Philippe in 1966 and became president of the company in 1993. He served as president until 2009, when he was succeeded by his son Thierry Stern, and subsequently became honorary president of Patek Philippe.

Stern died on 14 June 2026, at the age of 87.
