= Al-Taj Gümüshtegin =

Al-Taj Gümüshtegin, also known as Fakhr al-Dawla Gümüshtegin al-Tājī, eunuch governor of Baalbek through 1110, a freedman of Tutush I. Al-Taj briefly jailed Tutush’s son Irtash in 1104 before he was released by Toghtekin. He was replaced by Toghtekin’s son Buri. In exchange for Baalbek, Toghtekin granted al-Taj the fortress of Salkhad where he died in 1131.
