= Safwat al-Mulk =

Safwat al-Mulk Khatun
- Died: 1119; Damascus, Syria
- Burial: Al-Khanqah al-Tawusiyya, Damascus
- Spouse: Tutush I
- Issue: Abu Nasr Shams al-Muluk Duqaq; Fakhr al-Mulk Ridwan; Zumurrud Khatun
- Dynasty: Seljuk

Safwat al-Mulk Khatun (Arabic: صفوة الملك خاتون) was a prominent Seljuk noblewoman in 11th-century Damascus, Syria. She commissioned a mausoleum in 1110 for her and her son, Shams al-Mulûk, to be buried in. The mausoleum was destroyed in 1938 by the French Mandate.

Safwat al-Mulk Khatun was a member of the Saljûq house and married Tutush I, brother of the Seljuk sultan Malik-Shah I. Tutush I was the Seljuk ruler of Damascus from 1078 to 1095. He became sultan of Aleppo after 1092, and his reign ended in 1095 with his death.

She played an essential dynastic role as the mother of Abu Nasr Shams al-Muluk Duqaq and Fakhr al-Mulk Ridwan. Abu Nasr Shams al-Muluk Duqaq succeeded Tutush as ruler of Damascus after he died in 1095 and ruled until 1104. Fakhr al-Mulk Ridwan ruled as Seljuk emir of Aleppo from 1095 to 1113. When her son, Abu Nasr Shams al-Muluk Duqaq, died, Safwat al-Mulk became the last surviving member of the Seljuk ruling family still living in Damascus.

She also had a daughter, Zumurrud Khatun, a half-sister of Shams al-Mulûk Abû Nasr Duqâq, outside her marriage to Tutush I.

Safwat al-Mulk died in 1119. She was buried in the mausoleum she commissioned in 1110, Al-Khanqah al-Tawusiyya, alongside her son, Shams al-Mulûk. The qubbah of the mausoleum overlooked the Maydân al-Akhḍar (Green Field). The structure served both as a memorial to her status and as a religious foundation, marking her lasting imprint on the city.

== Mausoleum ==
Safwat al-Mulk funded the creation of the Tomb of Safwat al-Mulk, or Al-Khanqah al-Tawusiyya, and helped to establish a precedent of patronage of religious architecture by Muslim women in medieval Damascus. The tomb was constructed in 1110-1111 (504) 8 years before her own demise. She chose a location outside the city wall of Damascus, northwest of the citadel on the northern bank of the Barada river. Today the area is known as the historic Zuqaq al-Sakhr neighborhood. It was originally located within a larger complex of public buildings including a Sufi convent and a madrassa. It is commonly believed that the Tomb of Safwat al-Mulk also housed the remains of her son, Duqaq, alongside hers. However, some scholars believe the Tomb of Safwat al-Mulk was one part of a group of monumental buildings built by her patronage, which included a separate tomb for her son and an oratory. This complex was destroyed by fire in 1229, and by the early 20th century, only the tomb of Safwat al-Mulk remained. The tomb was demolished in 1938 by the French Mandate which deemed the cost to restore the building too high.

French archaeologist Jean Sauvaget and French architect Michel Écochard recorded the building prior to its demolition. There are no other preserved monuments that place their construction entirely within the Seljuk period of rule over the city. Max van Berchem also produced several sketches of the mausoleumSauvaget, Jean; Écochard, Michel (1950). "Le tombeau de Ṣafwat al-Molk". Les Monuments Ayyoubides de Damas (in French). Presses de l’Ifpo. pp. 1–13. ISBN 978-2-35159-455-1..

The tomb (9.3 meters by 6.45 meters) was composed of a primary domed square room (6.45 meters by 6.45 meters) and two secondary rectangular rooms (1 meter by 3 meters) with semi-domes on the eastern and western sides. It was constructed from “rough rubble” composed of reused limestone, basalt, and white marble. The mortar used contained particularly high amounts of ash, and the domes were held by wooden joinery. A thin layer of white plaster covered the entirety of the interior and the majority of the exterior, likely to cover the disparate array of materials used in construction. Very few decorations adorned the mausoleum. The squinches of the semi-domes featured calligraphic Kufic inscriptions painted in cobalt blue and black. Three of them read:

“In the name of God, the Most Gracious, the Most Merciful.”

“God and His angels bless the Prophet: O you who believe, bless him and send peace upon him. God Almighty speaks the truth.”

“Praise be to God for His blessings and may God bless Muhammad and his family!”

The mihrab on the south wall had an arch above it with symmetrical foliage motifs. The northern rectangular entrance portal features a black stone keystone in the relieving arch and three white marble slabs with Kufic inscriptions detailing the founding of the mausoleum.

“The order to build this funerary monument (Mashhad) and the mausoleum that it contains… had been given in 504 (1110-1111) by the princess Safwat al-Mulk, mother of Duqaq, son of Tutush and Seljuk prince of Damascus (488-497 AH, 1095-1104).”

[The text following the ellipses as proposed by Sauvaget and Écochard due to the deterioration of the original inscription]

There is a disagreement among scholars as to the location of the bodies of Safwat al-Mulk and her son Duqaq. According to Jean Sauvaget and Michel Écochard, the founding inscription outlines the beginning of the building’s construction. Since it would have been founded 7 years after Duqaq’s death, he would have to have been buried in a separate tomb. However, Terry Allen and other historians believe the inscription records the founding of the waqf, or endowment, that funded the mausoleum’s maintenance. In this case, both Safwat al-Mulk and her son could have been buried together in the mausoleum, as was typical in many family mausoleums.
