= Yusuf ibn Firuz =

Yusuf ibn Firuz (surname also spelled Fayruz) was the military governor under successive Burid atabegs of Damascus. Ibn Firuz served first with Toghtekin and then his son Taj al-Mulk Buri after the death of the former in 1128. In 1129, Buri and ibn Firuz began the massacre of Nizari Isma'ili partisans, beginning with al-Mazdaghani, Toghtekin's vizier, killing or expelling the Assassins from the city. Ibn Firuz was a close adviser to Buri. However, when Buri was succeeded by his son Shams al-Mulk Isma'il, the latter tried to have ibn Firuz killed because he feared that Ibn Firuz was plotting his murder.

== Bibliography ==
- Runciman, Steven (1951). A History of the Crusades, Volume II: The Kingdom of Jerusalem and the Frankish East, 1100-1187. Cambridge University Press. ISBN 9780521347716.
- Setton, Kenneth M.; Baldwin, Marshall W., eds. (1969) [1955]. A History of the Crusades, Volume I: The First Hundred Years (Second ed.). Madison, Milwaukee, and London: University of Wisconsin Press. p. 707. ISBN 0-299-04834-9.
