= Irtash =

Seljuk ruler of Damascus in 1104

Emir of Damascus
- Reign: 8 June 1104 – 1104
- Coronation: 10 October 1104 (Note: Ibn al-Qalanisi puts Irtash's coronation on 10 October 1104, though modern Turkish historian İbrahim Duman believes that this was an error and Irtash was actually crowned on 18 September 1104.)
- Predecessor: Duqaq
- Successor: Toghtekin
- Born: c. 1092
Names
- Muhyi al-Din Irtash ibn Tutush
- House: Seljuk
- Father: Tutush I
- Religion: Sunni Islam

Irtash (Note: Medieval Muslim chroniclers like al-Qalanisi, Ibn Asakir, al-Jawzi, and Al-Dhahabi refer to him as Irtash (Turkish: Ertaş; Arabic: إرتاش), also romanised as Artash, Irtāsh, and Ertash, though al-Athir uses Bektash (Turkish: Bektaş; Arabic: باقتش). He had two known honorific titles, Muhyi al-Din (Reviver of Religion), and Mujir ad-Din (Protector of Religion).) (born c. 1092) was a Seljuk emir of Damascus in 1104. Irtash was born to Taj ad-Dawla Tutush, the brother of the Seljuk Sultan Malik-Shah I who established a principality in Syria after his brother gave the region and the adjacent areas to him. Following the death of Malik-Shah, Tutush claimed the Seljuk crown, but he was killed by the forces of his nephew Berkyaruq near Ray. Subsequently, Irtash's brother Ridwan moved to Aleppo and proclaimed himself the new emir. Irtash's other brother Duqaq's declaration of a new emirate in Damascus separated the Syrian Seljuk state into two and started a rivalry between the two brothers. Duqaq then imprisoned Irtash for nine years in Baalbek.

Toghtekin, atabeg of Damascus, (Note: a hereditary governor subordinate to a monarch) elevated the twelve-year-old Irtash to emir after Duqaq's death in 1104. He ruled there for three months until sneaking out of the city to ally with Baldwin I, King of Jerusalem, against Toghtekin, who Irtash thought was conspiring against him. However, preoccupied with the Fatimid threat from Egypt, Baldwin did not assist Irtash and his ally Aytakin al-Halabi, the emir of Bosra. They left Baldwin's side and moved to Bosra which was surrendered to Toghtekin in 1106. Irtash then moved to al-Rahba, which was the scene of a war between the Seljuk emir Chavli Saqaveh and Muhammad Ibn Sabbak, the fort's ruler who had pledged loyalty to Saqaveh's opponent, Kilij Arslan I, the Seljuq Sultan of Rûm. Chavli captured al-Rahba and Irtash joined his ranks. There is no further information about Irtash, and he is regarded as one of the most unknown figures in Seljuk history.

== Background ==
Irtash ibn Tutush was born in 1091 or 1092. He was one of five sons of Tutush, the brother of the Seljuk sultan Malik-Shah I, and the mayor of Ganja in Arran. In 1078, Malik-Shah sent Tutush to conquer Syria and the adjacent areas, creating a principality there. Tutush besieged and conquered Aleppo next year, while a Fatimid army simultaneously besieged Damascus. Thereupon, the ruler of Damascus, Atsiz ibn Uwaq (r. 1071–1079), asked for help from Tutush. Having heard that Tutush was coming, the Fatimid forces retreated. Even though Atsiz accepted Tutush's suzerainty, Tutush had Atsiz strangled with the bowstring of his bow on the pretext that he was late to greet him and that he was conspiring against him with his brother. Tutush conquered Southern Syria and Palestine, capturing Jerusalem, Damascus, Acre, Tyre, Tripoli, Jaffa, and Arish, as well as the region of Galilee, previously held by Atsiz, and founded the Syrian Seljuk State.

Map of the Seljuk Empire at the death of Malik-Shah I in 1092

Tutush struggled with the Seljuk Sultan of Rum, Suleiman ibn Qutalmish (r. 1077–1086), who had claimed Aleppo. Suleiman was defeated and killed in a battle that took place near Aleppo on 4 June 1086. Malik-Shah I died in November 1092, leaving no princes of age to inherit the Seljuk empire. Tutush claimed the Seljuk throne, as he was the only surviving adult in the dynasty, though he gained little support from the Turkic elite. He then captured Mosul, Aleppo, and the Diyar Bakr. One of Malik-Shah I's wives, Terken Khatun, who was trying to install her four-year-old son Mahmud to the throne, then attempted to reach out to Tutush, but died suddenly in 1094. By 1094, Tutush, accompanied by his son Duqaq, had invaded the Jazira and western Iran, seizing Ray. However, Tutush was killed by his nephew Berkyaruq's forces near the same city on 25 February 1095.

Duqaq and his brother Ridwan returned to Aleppo after their father's death. Ridwan took over the Syrian Seljuk throne in Aleppo. Ridwan, fearing they might gain power and overthrow him, strangled his two brothers, Abu Talib and Behram, while Duqaq, accompanied by atabeg Janah ad-Dawla al-Husain, then fled Aleppo and moved to Damascus, founding an independent Emirate of Damascus there. Ridwan did not recognize Duqaq's domain and proclaimed himself as the sole legitimate ruler of the Syrian Seljuks. Thereupon, Ridwan besieged the city, but was unsuccessful in seizing it and had to return to Aleppo. Thus, the Syrian Seljuk sultanate was divided into two, Aleppo and Damascus. Sometime during this period, Duqaq imprisoned Irtash, who was three or four years old, at Baalbek, fearing that he might try to seize the crown. The town, located north of Damascus, was a three-day ride from the city and was ruled by Fakhr al-Dawla Gümüshtegin al-Taji, one of Tutush's freed slaves. The rivalry between Duqaq and Ridwan continued after the Crusaders arrived in 1097, though they both fought against the Crusaders, who established their own state in the Holy Land.

== Reign ==
=== Rule in Damascus ===
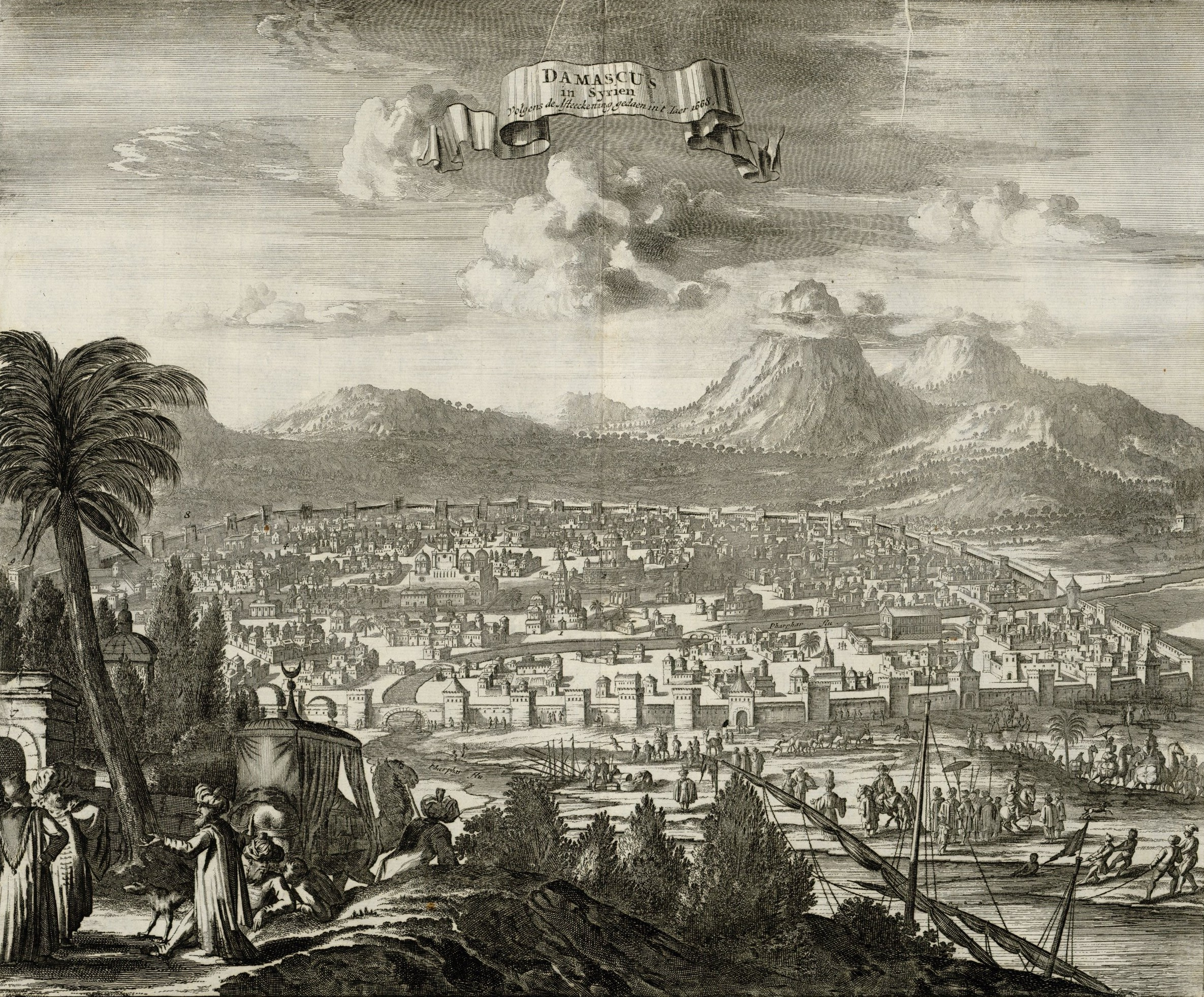
A general view of Damascus, drawn by Olfert Dapper in 1667

Duqaq died of tuberculosis on 6 June 1104, and was succeeded by his son, Tutush II. Soon after, his atabeg Toghtekin set aside Tutush II and his relatives. Toghtekin then freed the 12-year-old Irtash, who had been imprisoned for the previous nine years. According to contemporary Muslim chronicler Ibn al-Qalanisi and modern Egyptian historian Taef Kamal Al-Azhari, Irtash was crowned on 10 October 1104. However, modern Turkish historian İbrahim Duman believes that to be an error, and suggests that Irtash was actually crowned on 18 September 1104. He also argues that Toghtekin, who was opposed by many after becoming the vizier of Duqaq, sought to unite the notables of Damascus under Irtash's rule, thus aiming to maintain a strong position within the domain.

Irtash's mother convinced him that Toghtekin and his wife, Khatun Safwat al-Mulk, who was Duqaq's mother, were conspiring against Irtash. It is not known if Toghtekin brought Irtash to Damascus to have him killed, while Safwat al-Mulk may have wanted to reinstate the rulership of her grandson Tutush. Irtash's supporters and Toghtekin's opponents were recommending he leave Damascus and go to Baalbek, and depose Toghtekin with the help of the Crusaders. Because of the rumours, Irtash had to move away from Damascus in October or November 1104. Toghtekin then gave khutbah in Tutush's name in Damascus, crowning him for the second time. Al-Qalanisi details a narrative in which Toghtekin advised Irtash to seize the al-Rahba. When Irtash returned from his successful expedition, Toghtekin did not let him into the city, and Irtash had to go to one of his castles. One of Toghtekin's opponents, Aytekin al-Halabi, emir of Bosra, also joined Irtash. Al-Azhari claimed Aytekin left Damascus after Irtash had already secretly fled, though Turkish historians Coşkun Alptekin and Ali Sevim believe Aytekin was with Irtash when he left the town. They moved to Hauran, south of Damascus and gathered men there. They also persuaded Baldwin I, King of Jerusalem, that Toghtekin had posed a threat to the Crusaders and to aid them against him.

=== Alliance with Baldwin I ===
In August 1105, the Fatimids launched a war on the Crusaders to expel them from Palestine. The Fatimids asked Toghtekin for help; Al-Qalanisi states that Toghtekin initially turned down the Fatimids' request and besieged Bosra; though he later changed his mind, knowing that Irtash was with them. The Fatimid army of ten thousand horsemen and infantry under the command of Sharaf al-Ma'ali, the son of al-Afdal Shahanshah, moved towards Ascalon. Toghtekin also joined the Fatimid army with 1,300-strong cavalry. The Crusaders positioned two armies between Jaffa and Ascalon, with Irtash also contributing to the Crusader army with 100 Turcoman archers. In the battle that took place on 27 August 1105, neither side could gain the upper hand, however, the Fatimids suffered more casualties than the Crusaders. The Fatimid emir of Ascalon, Gamal al-Mulk, was killed, and the Crusaders captured some other emirs. The Fatimid army then retreated, and the expedition failed.

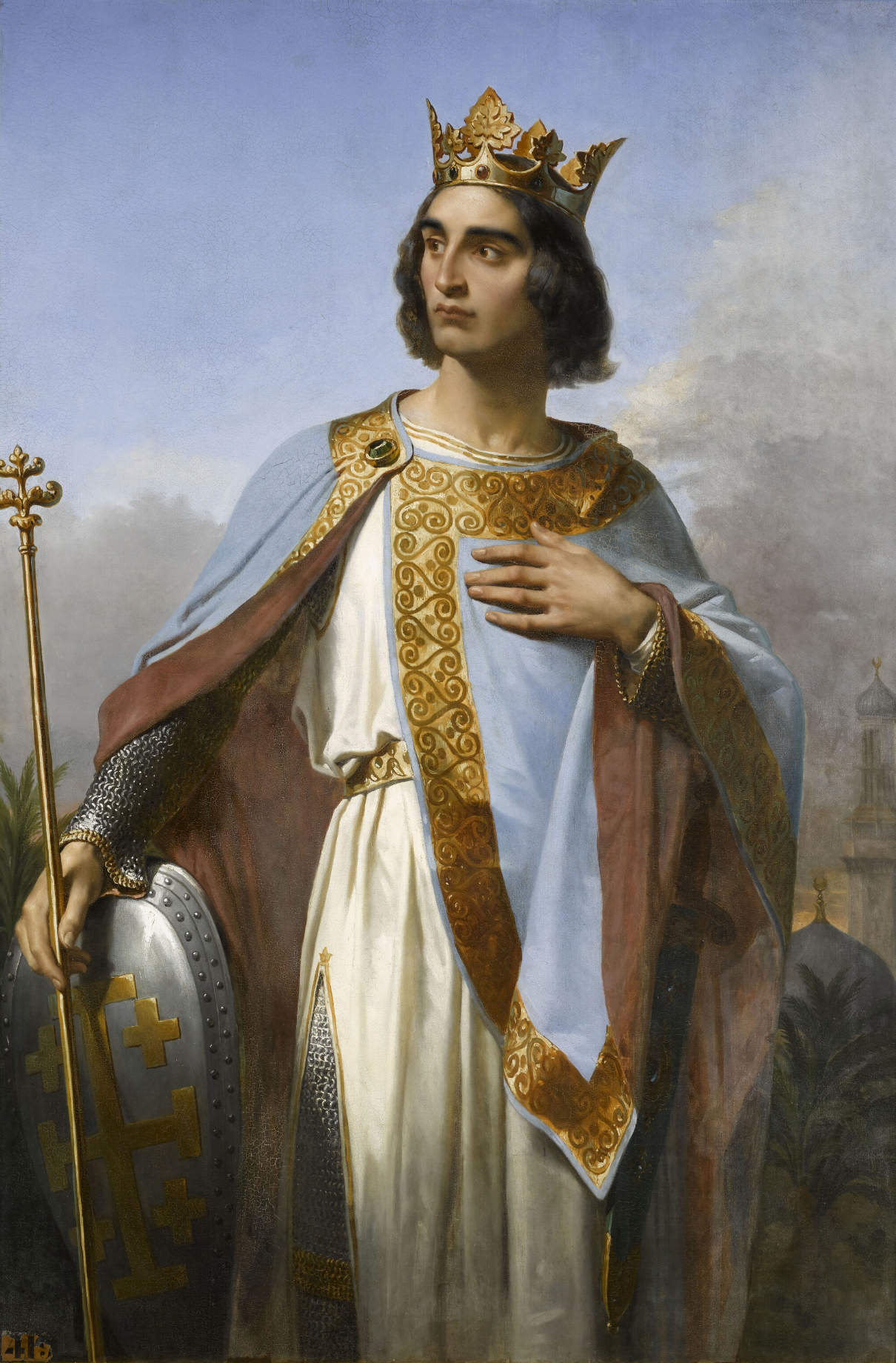
Baldwin (1844 painting by Merry-Joseph Blondel)

Baldwin I was to help Irtash against Toghtekin after the failed Fatimid expedition, however, he did not. Al-Azhari states Baldwin I thought that his army could not defeat Toghtekin's forces and Damascus. Contrary to this, Duman argues Baldwin sought to make the Muslim emirs even more hostile to each other and to cause turmoil in Damascus, which he had desired for a long time. The rivalry between Irtash and Toghtekin was a very important opportunity for Baldwin I to take over Damascus, and by using Irtash, he could have eliminated his nemesis, Toghtekin, and captured Damascus at the same time. Irtash and Aytekin got wind of this, and left the Crusaders' side for Bosra, ending the three-month-long alliance.

=== Final years ===
Toghtekin besieged Bosra in 1106. During the siege, Irtash and Aytekin fled the town. After some time, Aytekin grew tired of the siege and agreed to hand over Bosra to Toghtekin in September. Toghtekin achieved a victory against Irtash and Aytekin in their weakened state.

There is little information on Aytekin after the loss of Bosra, but it is known that Irtash went to al-Rahba. In 1107, the Seljuk Sultan Muhammad I Tapar appointed Chavli Saqaveh as the emir of Mosul. Chavli launched an expedition on the incumbent emir of Mosul, Jikirmish, and Kilij Arslan I. Chavli also besieged al-Rahba to punish its ruler, Muhammad ibn Sabbak, who had pledged loyalty to Kilij Arslan. Irtash was in a fortress during this siege. Ibn Sabbak was previously a vassal of Duqaq and later ruled the fort on behalf of Kilij Arslan. Duman argues this meant that Ibn Sabbak had taken a stand against Toghtekin, and Irtash had taken refuge in al-Rahba because of this. Chavli, who was angered as he had spent too much time besieging the city, ordered his men to pillage the fort's environs. The locals demanded Ibn Sabbak surrender the fort, and Chavli became victorious on 23 May 1107. Although Chavli reinstated Ibn Sabbak as the ruler of al-Rahba, he then imprisoned him. Chavli thought Ibn Sabbak was provoking the populace against him. Irtash joined Chavli's ranks after the capture of the fort.

There is little information available on Irtash's life after this event, and his date of death is unknown. Sevim assumes that Irtash died in 1105 on his way to al-Rahba, but this is disputed by Duman. The latter argues Irtash may have died in 1107, when he was fifteen. Though he also considers the possibility of him living for many years, as he was only fifteen in 1107; though he ruled no city, nor was he in the foreground of subsequent events.

== Sources ==
- Al-Azhari, Taef Kamal (1997). The Saljūqs of Syria During the Crusades, 463–549 A.H., 1070–1154 A.D. Berlin: Schwarz.
- Albert of Aachen (2007). Edgington, Susan B. (ed.). Albert of Aachen: Historia Ierosolimitana, History of the Journey to Jerusalem. Clarendon Press. ISBN 978-0-19-920486-1.
- Alptekin, Coşkun (1985). Dımaşk Atabegliği (Tog-Teginliler) (in Turkish). İstanbul: Marmara Üniversitesi Fen-Edebiyat Fakültesi Yayınları.
- Bosworth, Clifford E. (1968). "The Political and Dynastic History of the Iranian World (A.D. 1000–1217)". In Frye, R. N. (ed.). The Cambridge History of Iran, Volume 5: The Saljuq and Mongol periods. Cambridge: Cambridge University Press. pp. 1–202. ISBN 978-0-521-06936-6.
- Bosworth, Clifford E. (1988). "Barkīāroq". Encyclopaedia Iranica, Vol. III, Fasc. 8.
- Brett, Micheal (1995). Vermeulen, U.; de Smet, D. (eds.). "The Battles of Ramla (1099–1105) // Egypt and Syria in the Fatimid, Ayyubid and Mamluk eras". Orientalia Lovaniensia Analecta (73). Leuven: Peeters: 17–38. ISBN 90-6831-683-4.
- Cahen, Claude; Runciman, Steven; Fink, Harold S. (1958). Baldwin, Marshall W.; Setton, Kenneth Meyer (eds.). A History of the Crusades: The First Hundred Years. Vol. 1. Madison, Wisconsin: University of Wisconsin Press. pp. 135–176, 308–342, 368–409. doi:10.9783/9781512818642. ISBN 978-1-5128-1864-2.
- Cahen, Claude (1960). "Barkyārūḳ". In Gibb, H. A. R.; Kramers, J. H.; Lévi-Provençal, E.; Schacht, J.; Lewis, B. & Pellat, Ch. (eds.). The Encyclopaedia of Islam, Second Edition. Volume I: A–B. Leiden: E. J. Brill. OCLC 495469456.
- Duman, İbrahim (26 January 2016). "Dımaşk Selçuklu Meliki Ertaş b. Tutuş". Journal of Turkology (in Turkish): 107–115.
- Humphreys, R. Stephen (1994). "Women as Patrons of Religious Architecture in Ayyubid Damascus". Muqarnas. 11. Brill: 35–54. doi:10.2307/1523208. JSTOR 1523208.
- Ibn al-Qalanisi (1908). Amedroz, Henry Frederick (ed.). History of Damascus, 363-555 A.H. Leiden: E.J. Brill.
- Ibn al-Qalanisi (1932). Gibb, H. A. R. (ed.). The Damascus Chronicle of the Crusades. Luzac. ISBN 0-486-42519-3.
- Maalouf, Amin (1984). The Crusades Through Arab Eyes. New York: Schocken Books. ISBN 0-8052-0898-4.
- Murray, Alan V. (2006). "Artāsh". The Crusades: An Encyclopedia. Vol. I. ABC-Clio. ISBN 978-1-57607-862-4.
- Peacock, A. C. S. (2015). The Great Seljuk Empire. Edinburgh University Press. ISBN 978-0-7486-3826-0.
- Sevim, Ali (1991). "Atsız b. Uvak". TDV Encyclopedia of Islam, Vol. 4 (Âşik Ömer – Bâlâ Külli̇yesi̇) (in Turkish). Istanbul: Presidency of Religious Affairs, Centre for Islamic Studies. ISBN 978-975-389-431-9.
- Schulze, Wolfgang (2008). "An anonymous copper coin re-attributed from Trebizond to Syria". The Numismatic Chronicle. 168. Royal Numismatic Society: 321–330. ISSN 0078-2696. JSTOR 42678770.
- Sevim, Ali (2000). Suriye Ve Filistin Selçukluları Tarihi (in Turkish). Türk Tarih Kurumu Yayınları.
- Sümer, Faruk (2009). "Suriye Selçukluları". TDV Encyclopedia of Islam, Vol. 36 (Sakal – Sevm) (in Turkish). Istanbul: Presidency of Religious Affairs, Centre for Islamic Studies. ISBN 978-975-389-566-8.
- Sevim, Ali (2008). "Rıdvân b. Tutuş". TDV Encyclopedia of Islam, Vol. 35 (Resûlîler – Sak) (in Turkish). Istanbul: Presidency of Religious Affairs, Centre for Islamic Studies. ISBN 978-975-389-457-9.
- Tetley, Gillis (2008). The Ghaznavid and Seljuk Turks: Poetry as a Source for Iranian History. Routledge. ISBN 978-1-134-08438-8.
- Wiet, Gaston (1965). "Deux inscriptions arabes de la Syrie méridionale". Syria (in French). 42 (1/2): 81–90. doi:10.3406/syria.1965.5837. ISSN 0039-7946. JSTOR 4197511.
- Özaydın, Abdülkerim (2012). "Tutuş". TDV Encyclopedia of Islam, Vol. 41 (Tevekkül – Tüsterî) (in Turkish). Istanbul: Presidency of Religious Affairs, Centre for Islamic Studies. ISBN 978-975-389-713-6.
- Özaydın, Abdülkerim (2016). "Dukak b. Tutuş". TDV Encyclopedia of Islam, Supplement 1 (Abazalar – Kaftan) (in Turkish). Istanbul: Presidency of Religious Affairs, Centre for Islamic Studies. ISBN 978-975-389-878-2.

Regnal titles
Preceded by Duqaq	Emir of Damascus; 1104	Succeeded by Toghtekin
