= Zumurrud Khatun =

Ruler of Damascus

Zumurrud Khatun زمرد خاتون

Regent of Damascus for Burids
- Tenure: 1135 – 1138
- Born: Damascus, Syria
- Died: 1139/1140s Aleppo, Syria
- Burial: Aleppo
- Spouse: Taj al-Muluk Buri (until his death in 1132); Imad al-Din Zengi ( from 1138 until her death)
- Issue: Shams al-Mulk Isma'il; Shihab al-Din Mahmud
- House: Burid Dynasty (by marriage); Zengid Dynasty (by marriage)
- Mother: Safwat al-Mulk
- Religion: Sunni Islam

Zumurrud Khatun (Arabic: زمرد خاتون) (died after 1139), was the regent of Damascus between 1135 and 1138.

She was the daughter of Safwat al-Mulk and the half-sister of Duqaq. She married Buri b. Tughtekin. In 1132, her son Shams al-Mulk Isma'il became king of Damascus. She was not on good terms with her eldest son. It is clear from the events described about her life, that she did not live in gender segregation secluded in a harem.

Her son allegedly invited Imad al-Din Zengi to take power in Damascus. The army commanders came to her and asked her to intervene against her son's rule. Zumurrud Khatun commissioned her own mamluk soldiers to assassinate her son in her presence in the citadel of Damascus on 14 February 1135. She had his body thrown out of the window, and her action was greeted with blessings.

After the assassination of her eldest son, she had her second son Shihab al-Din Mahmud placed on the throne. She sat side by side with Mahmud, and they received the oath of loyalty from the elite of Damascus together. The elite explicitly greeted them both as rulers:

"Emirs, soldiers and nobles were forced to recognize him and give the oath of allegiance to both of them, that they would sincerely serve both, and support their supporters and fight their enemies."

To receive the oath of loyalty in this manner was almost unique for a woman in a Muslim state, but the Caliph did not contest her position and she was allowed to continue as formal regent of her son. She appointed Fayruz as deputy of Hims in 1136, and as one of the regents of her son. This act caused the commander Baswaj and other elites to protest directly to her, which demonstrates that she was the acknowledged ruler of the state.

Her rule continued until May 1138, when she was suggested marriage by Imad al-Din Zengi. Unable to turn down this political match, she married him and abandoned her regency and moved to Aleppo. When her son was killed in 1139, she asked her new spouse to invade Damascus to avenge her son's murder.
