= Henri Stern =

Art historian and mosaic scholar (1902–1988)

- Born: 13 November 1902; Munich, Germany
- Died: 4 September 1988 (aged 85); Paris, France
- Education: Heidelberg University; Leipzig University; Ludwig-Maximilians-Universität München
- Known for: Recueil général des mosaïques de la Gaule; Study of the Calendar of 354
- Scientific career
- Fields: History of art; Mosaic studies; Late antique, Byzantine and early Islamic art
- Institutions: French National Centre for Scientific Research; École pratique des hautes études
- Doctoral advisor: Wilhelm Pinder

Henri Stern (13 November 1902 – 4 September 1988) was a German-born art historian who spent his career in France. Trained in Germany as a specialist in Baroque sculpture and the decorative arts, he was dismissed from his museum post due to anti-Jewish laws, and immigrated to Paris in 1933, where he turned to the study of ancient and medieval mosaics and to the art and iconography of late antiquity, Byzantium and early Islam. At the French National Centre for Scientific Research (CNRS) he built a research team devoted to mosaic and founded the Association Internationale pour l'Étude de la Mosaïque Antique (AIEMA) in 1964. He launched the corpus Recueil général des mosaïques de la Gaule, and his study of the Calendar of 354 remained a standard work on late antique iconography.

== Life ==
=== Early life and education ===
Stern was born in Munich on 13 November 1902, the son of Max Stern, a doctor. He passed his Abitur at Munich in 1921 and studied art history from 1922 to 1929 at Heidelberg University, Leipzig University, and Ludwig-Maximilians-Universität München, where his teachers included Heinrich Wölfflin, Wilhelm Pinder and Max Hauttmann. He took his doctorate at the Ludwig-Maximilians-Universität-München in 1929 with a dissertation on Munich Baroque sculpture, Münchner Barockplastik von 1660–1720, supervised by Pinder. He then held museum posts, as an assistant at the Residenz museum in 1930 and 1931 and at the Bavarian National Museum in 1931, where he enlarged the catalogue of pewter, and from January 1933 at the Frankfurt museum of decorative arts, where he catalogued the glass collection. He was dismissed from the Frankfurt post on 27 March 1933, before the Law for the Restoration of the Professional Civil Service, because he was Jewish.

=== Emigration and career in France ===
In April 1933 Stern immigrated to Paris, where he first worked at the Musée d'Ethnographie. There he took up two fields new to him, Byzantine mosaic and early Islamic art, which he pursued at the École pratique des hautes études. Together with Gabriel Millet he began a study of the Byzantine mosaics of the Church of the Nativity at Bethlehem. In 1938 he was awarded a grant by the French National Centre for Scientific Research (CNRS) for an excavation expedition to Syria to study early mosaics, but the expedition was cancelled by the outbreak of the Second World War, and he spent the first two years of the war in the French Resistance. After the war he resumed his research on mosaic at the CNRS, where he assembled his own team of specialists.

== Work ==
=== Mosaic studies ===
Stern gave more than thirty years to the study of mosaic technique. He took up again a French project begun early in the 20th century, the Inventaire des mosaïques de la Gaule et de l'Afrique of Blanchet and Lafaye, and in 1957 published the first fascicle of the Recueil général des mosaïques de la Gaule, which, like the earlier Inventaire, also recorded medieval mosaics. The Recueil grew into a corpus arranged by Roman province, several volumes of which he wrote with collaborators, and which continued to appear after his death. He organised the corpus on editorial criteria that were afterwards adopted by comparable undertakings in neighbouring countries, founded the Association Internationale pour l'Étude de la Mosaïque Antique in 1964 together with an annual bibliographical bulletin, and organised two international colloquia, at Paris in 1963 and Vienna in 1976.

One of the most original features of his work was the attention he gave to artistic continuities between antiquity and the Middle Ages across the paleochristian and Carolingian periods. Preparing the Recueil led him to publish monographic studies of several medieval mosaics, often in the Cahiers archéologiques, among them those of Thiers (1954), Reims cathedral (1957), Lyon cathedral (1964), Saint-Sever (1968) and Layrac (1970). For the first time in France such works were treated as monumental ensembles with iconographic programmes of their own, on the same footing as wall painting or sculpture. In 1968 he redated the pavement of the basilica of Pomposa, until then often held to be paleochristian, to the Middle Ages. In 1962 he set out, in the Cahiers de civilisation médiévale, a synthesis of twenty-nine medieval mosaics that laid the basis for a general definition of preromanesque and romanesque pavement mosaic in France. He defined medieval pavement mosaic as a technique standing in continuity with antiquity through the early Middle Ages.

=== Late antique art and the Calendar of 354 ===
Stern gave an essential part of his research to late antiquity. His major thesis, Le Calendrier de 354: étude sur son texte et ses illustrations, appeared in 1953. For the study of the most important and most complete of the Roman calendars he worked in the line opened at the end of the 19th century by Josef Strzygowski, and his contribution to the history and iconography of late antiquity remained fundamental. In the same year he also published a study of the date and addressee of the Historia Augusta. Around the thesis he published a series of studies on the iconography of the months in Gallo-Roman, Carolingian and Byzantine art, later gathered in a synthesis, 'Les calendriers romains illustrés', in Aufstieg und Niedergang der römischen Welt (1981).

His analytical method was displayed in his study of the wall and vault mosaics of Santa Costanza in Rome, whose decoration, executed around 350, he placed within the art of the 4th century (Dumbarton Oaks Papers, 1958). At the fifth international congress of Christian archaeology, held at Aix-en-Provence in 1954, he presented a study of the decoration of pavements and basins in paleochristian baptisteries, and he also treated the paleochristian pavements of Lebanon and the iconographic development of the Orpheus theme.

=== Byzantine and early Islamic art ===
Trained as a byzantinist, Stern kept a particular interest in the art of the eastern Mediterranean and of Byzantium, on which he left a short handbook. In two long memoirs published in the journal Byzantion in 1936 and 1938 he studied the depictions of church councils in the Church of the Nativity at Bethlehem, arguing that the mosaics of the north wall of the nave dated to the early 8th century while those of the south wall were restorations of the Crusader period (1167–1169). He defended this dating against the objections of R. W. Hamilton in further studies of 1948 and 1957.

After his work on Bethlehem, Stern turned to the little-explored archaeology of early Islam. He treated the mosaics of the al-Aqsa Mosque in a first monographic article in 1963, and returned to the mosaics of the Dome of the Rock and the Great Mosque of Damascus in a long study of 1972, which closed with the publication of sculpted panels from the Damascus mosque that Jean Sauvaget had entrusted to him in 1945. While the mosaics of the Dome of the Rock and of Damascus were generally taken to be Umayyad, the dating of those of the al-Aqsa Mosque was disputed: Stern proposed that they had been executed under the caliph al-Zahir in 1034–1035, after the earthquake of 1034, in direct imitation of the older Umayyad models. Against van Berchem's scepticism he defended his view by distinguishing style from iconography. He devoted a monograph, long in preparation and published in 1976, to the mosaics of the Great Mosque of Córdoba, written with Manuel Ocaña Jiménez and Dorothea Duda. He held the decoration of the mosque to have been completed in 970 or early 971.

== Selected publications ==
- Münchner Barockplastik von 1660–1720. Berlin, 1929. (doctoral dissertation)
- Le Calendrier de 354: étude sur son texte et ses illustrations. Paris, 1953.
- Date et destinataire de l'«Histoire Auguste». Paris, 1953.
- Recueil général des mosaïques de la Gaule. Paris, from 1957. (multi-volume corpus, founder and principal author)
- L'Art byzantin. Paris, 1965.
- Les mosaïques de la Grande Mosquée de Cordoue. With Manuel Ocaña Jiménez and Dorothea Duda. Berlin, 1976.
- Les mosaïques des maisons d'Achille et de Cassiopée à Palmyre. Paris, 1977.
- "Les calendriers romains illustrés". In Aufstieg und Niedergang der römischen Welt, II.12.2. Berlin, 1981, pp. 432–475.
