= Battle of the Dog River =

1100 battle near the Nahr al-Kalb river

- Part of Crusades
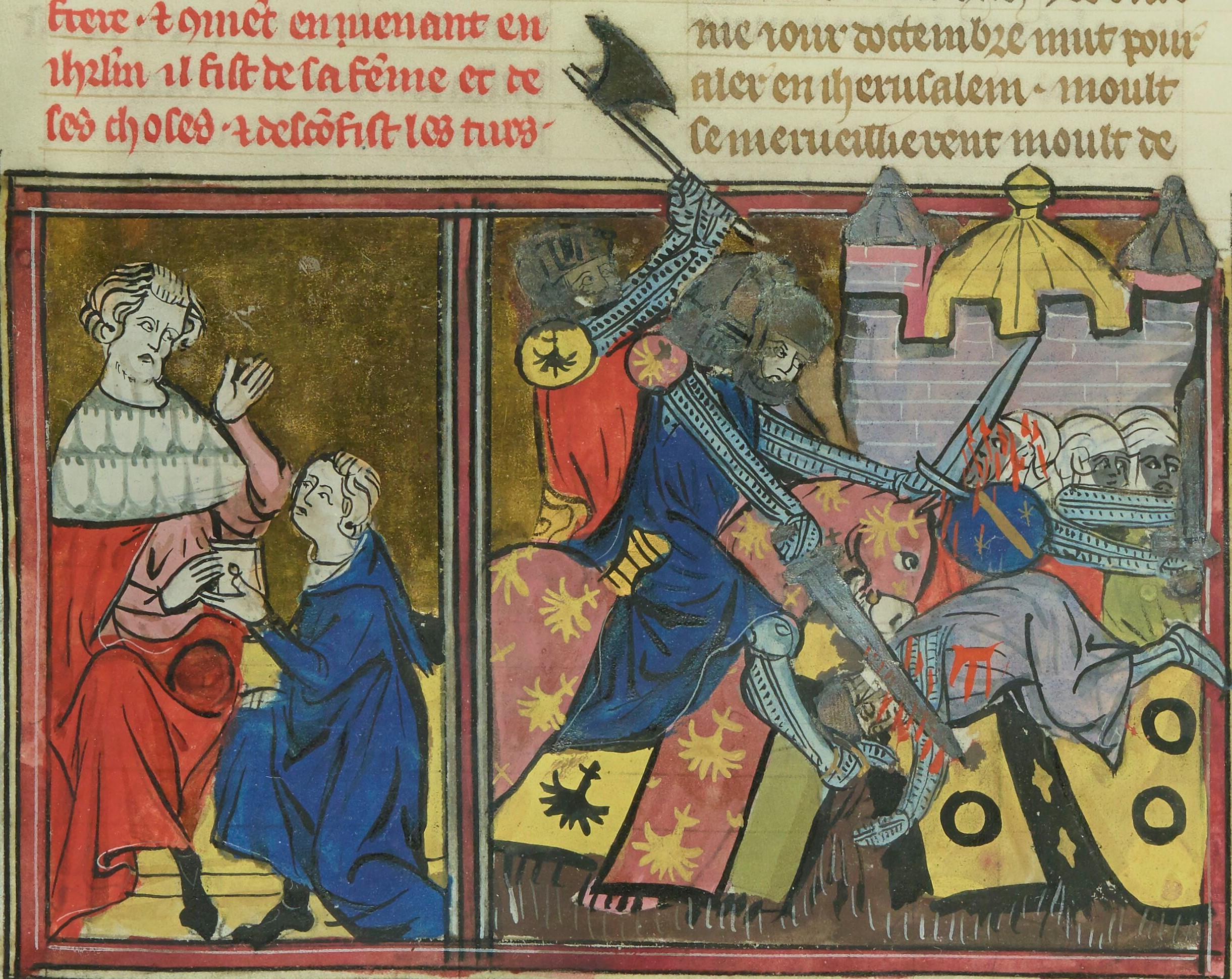
- Battle of Dog River
Date	October 1100
Location	Nahr al-Kalb river in Lebanon.
Result	Crusader victory

Belligerents
County of Edessa	Seljuks of Damascus

Commanders and leaders
Baldwin of Edessa	Duqaq of Damascus

Strength
200 Knights; 500 infantry	Unknown

Casualties and losses
Unknown	Heavy

The Battle of the Dog River was fought in 1100 between Crusader forces and the Seljuk Turks near the Nahr al-Kalb river in what is now modern day Lebanon. The Crusaders were led by Baldwin of Boulogne, Count of Edessa, while the Turks were led by Duqaq of Damascus. The Crusaders were victorious, and Baldwin was able to travel to Jerusalem unopposed in order to be crowned as King of Jerusalem.

== Background ==
After the death of Godfrey of Bouillon, the barons of the Kingdom of Jerusalem invited his brother Baldwin, Count of Edessa, to assume the lordship of the Kingdom, Baldwin made preparations for the dangerous journey in order to assume the kingship. To finance his journey to Jerusalem, he seized gold and silver from his subjects. He appointed his relative, Baldwin of Le Bourcq, his successor in the county. About 200 knights and 500 foot-soldiers accompanied Baldwin when he left Edessa on 2 October 1100.

== Battle ==
The battle was fought between the forces of Baldwin and Turks sent by Duqaq of Damascus, who had planned to cut off Baldwin's forces and trap them in the narrow passage on the public road which was next to the sea. Baldwin had been warned beforehand by the qadi of Tripoli and was thus able to rout the Damascene force, successfully staging a heavy cavalry charge after a feigned retreat had lured the Turks off the high ground.

== Aftermath ==
After the victory Baldwin was able to travel safely towards Jerusalem, as the Turks who had blockaded the road had been either scattered or were killed or captured during the battle. Once Baldwin had arrived he was ceremoniously accompanied by the people of the city to the Holy Sepulchre. Baldwin was then crowned King of Jerusalem. The ceremony took place in the Church of the Nativity in Bethlehem on Christmas Day.
