= Atsiz ibn Uwaq =

Ruler of Palestine from 1071 to 1079

Atsiz ibn Uwaq al-Khwarizmi, also known as al-Aqsis, Atsiz ibn Uvaq, Atsiz ibn Oq and Atsiz ibn Abaq (died October 1079), was a Turkoman mercenary commander who established a principality in Palestine and southern Syria after seizing these from the Fatimid Caliphate in 1071.

== Biography ==
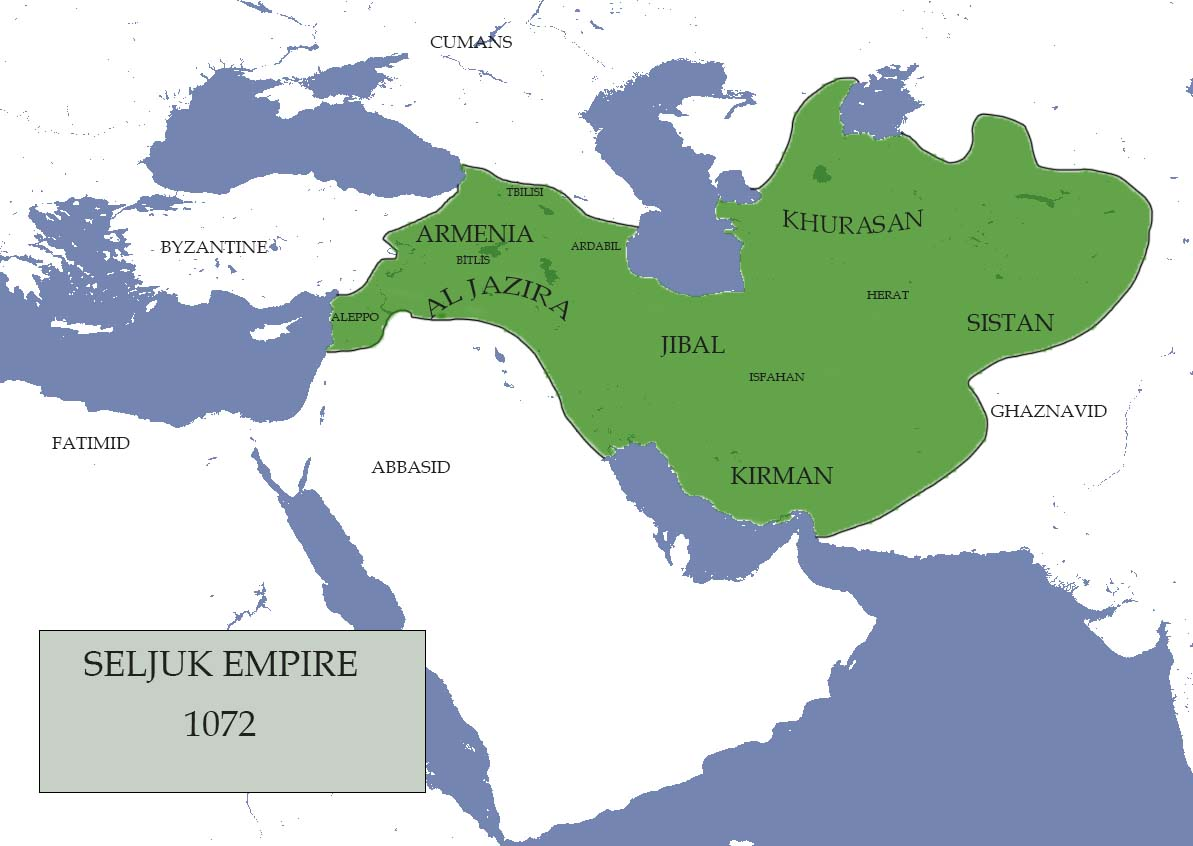
The Seljuk Empire in 1072. Atsiz' dominion would be to the south of Aleppo up to Egypt

Around 1069, Badr al-Jamali, then Fatimid governor (wali) of al-Sham, sent messengers to the Turkomans living in Anatolia, asking them to fight against invading Bedouin tribes in his region. The Fatimids had previously hired Turkoman mercenaries, which had become one of the dominant forces in the Caliphate. At the same time, in the Egyptian heartland of the Fatimid Caliphate, a civil war between the Sudanese and Turkoman mercenaries had begun that was starting to destabilise the Caliphate. According to Ibn al-Jawzi, al-Jamali intended to settle the nomadic Turkomans south of Ma'arrat al Nu'man.

Atsiz, commander of the Turkoman Nawaki tribe or group also known as Nawakiyya, arrived in Syria after that and seems to have fought for some time with the Fatimids against the Bedouins. In 1070, with the civil war in the Caliphate still raging, disputes about the financial compensation seem to have led some Turkoman to side with the Bedouin and seek to establish their own principality. The beginnings of the new principality are uncertain, but in 1073, Atsiz was in control of Jerusalem as well as Ramla, the provincial capital of the region. He captured Damascus in 1076, becoming the first Turkoman emir of Damascus, where he began construction of the Citadel of Damascus.

Having established his position in Palestine, Atsiz attempted to invade Egypt in October 1076. Here he had to face al-Jamali, who in 1074 had become vizier to the caliph al-Mustansir and stopped the bloody infights between the Caliphate's military. Atsiz advanced to Cairo where he started negotiations with Al-Jamali who, in the meantime, gathered his troops. Al-Jamali also bribed some of Atsiz' troops and in a battle in February 1077 he was so successful that Atsiz had to flee while one of his brothers was dead and another one had lost one of his arms.

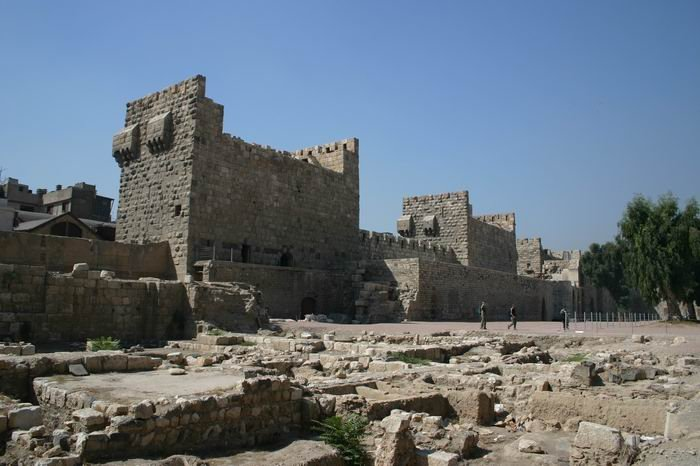
The construction of the Citadel of Damascus began during the reign of Atsiz, but the present citadel was built under the Ayyubid ruler al-Adil I

Atsiz's defeat led to rebellions in his domain, such as in Jerusalem, which he crushed brutally. In 1077, he broke his promise of amān, or quarter, given to the rebels, and after they opened the gates, his troops slaughtered an estimated 3,000 of them, including those who had taken shelter in the Al-Aqsa Mosque and only sparing those inside the Dome of the Rock. Al-Jamali, intent on profiting from the weakness of his enemy, sent an army under one of his Armenian generals, Nasr Al-Dawla, to confront him. Atsiz appealed to the Seljuks, and soon an army under Tutush I, brother of the Great Seljuk sultan Malik-Shah I, marched towards Damascus, scaring off the Fatimid forces. Tutush, however, decided to take control of Atsiz territories and had him first imprisoned, then strangled with a bowstring in October 1079.

== Legacy ==
Atsiz's principality represents one of the many Turkmen state foundations on the periphery of the Seljuk empire, such as the emirates of Rum, of Izmir or of the Danishmendids that sprung up during the same period. Atsiz by his conquest of Jerusalem from the weakened Fatimids, along with the 1071 Byzantine defeat against the Seljuk Turks at Manzikert, is quoted as a major cause for the Crusades, as these events created a sense of threat to the Christian holy places, Europe and Christianity as a whole.

== Bibliography ==
- Başan, Aziz (2010). The Great Seljuqs: A History. Abingdon: Routledge. pp. 85, 88–89. ISBN 978-0-203-84923-1.
- Burns, Ross (2005). Damascus: A History. Abingdon: Routledge. p. 144. ISBN 0-415-27105-3.
- Cahen, Claude (1960). "Atsiz b. Uvak". In Gibb, H. A. R.; Kramers, J. H.; Lévi-Provençal, E.; Schacht, J.; Lewis, B. & Pellat, Ch. (eds.). The Encyclopaedia of Islam, Second Edition. Volume I: A–B. Leiden: E. J. Brill. pp. 750–751. OCLC 495469456.
- Greenstone, Julius H. (January 1906). "The Turkoman Defeat at Cairo, by Solomon ben Joseph Ha-Kohen". The American Journal of Semitic Languages and Literatures. 22 (2): 144–175. doi:10.1086/369565. JSTOR 527656. S2CID 170839031.
- Kennedy, Hugh (1994). Crusader Castles. Cambridge: Cambridge University Press. p. 182. ISBN 0-521-42068-7.
- Richards, D. S. (Trans.) (2002). The Annals of the Saljuq Turks: Selections from al-Kamil fi'l-Ta'rikh of 'Izz al-Din Ibn al-Athir. Abingdon: Routledge. pp. 172, 190, 192–193, 197–198. ISBN 0-700-71576-2.

Regnal titles
Preceded by Zain ad-Dawlah Intisar ibn Yahya al-Masmudi	Emir of Damascus; 1076–1079	Succeeded by Tutush I
