= Mujir ad-Din Abaq =

Governor of Damascus from 1140 to 1154

Burid Emir of Damascus
- Rule: 1140 – 1154
- Predecessor: Jamal ad-Din Muhammad (as Atabeg of Damascus); Mu'in ad-Din Unur (as regent)
- Successor: Nur ad-Din Zengi (as Zengid ruler)
- Regent: Mu'in ad-Din Unur (1140–1149)
- Born: 1130s Damascus, Burid Emirate
- Died: 1169; Baghdad, Abbasid Caliphate, (now Iraq)
- Spouse: Daughter of Mu'in ad-Din Unur
Names
- Mujīr ad-Dīn ʿAbd al-Dawla Abu Saʿīd Ābaq ibn Jamāl ad-Dīn Muhammad
- House: Burids
- Father: Jamal ad-Din Muhammad
- Religion: Sunni Islam

Mujir ad-Din Abaq (Arabic: مجير الدين عبد الدولة أبو سعيد عبق بن جمال الدين محمد, romanized: Mujīr ad-Dīn ʿAbd al-Dawla Abu Saʿīd ʿAbaq ibn Jamāl ad-Dīn Muhammad) (died 1169) was the Burid emir of Damascus from 1140 to 1154. He was the eldest son of Jamal ad-Din Muhammad and the last Burid ruler of the Emirate of Damascus.

== Name ==
His honorific title "Mujīr ad-Dīn" means "protector of the faith".

His full name was Mujīr ad-Dīn ʿAbd al-Dawla Abu Saʿīd Ābaq ibn Jamāl ad-Dīn Muhammad.

== Life ==
After the death of his father in 1140, Mujir ad-Din succeeded his father as governor in 1140. As he was still a minor, Mu'in ad-Din Unur was named vizier. Zengi attacked Damascus, hoping to take advantage of Jamal ad-Din's death, but Mu'in ad-Din effectively organized the defense of the city. When this regent died in July 1149, Mujir ad-Din took his place as the rightful heir of Damascus. He was a weak ruler, however, and Damascus came under the influence of Nur ad-Din Zangi, emir of Aleppo and Mosul, who had imposed his dominance over the city in the aftermath of the Second Crusade.

In 1150, Nur ad-Din recognized Mujir ad-Din as ruler of Damascus, but in 1151 Mujir ad-Din allied with the crusaders against Bosra, angering Nur ad-Din. Later that year Mujir ad-Din visited Aleppo and swore to remain loyal to Nur ad-Din. In 1152, Mujir ad-Din again besieged Bosra, until the governor of the city agreed to his demands and he returned to Damascus. In 1153, Mujir ad-Din joined Nur ad-Din in his attempt to capture the crusader castle at Banias. In 1154, the two were in conflict again, and Nur ad-Din finally occupied Damascus by force, expelling Mujir ad-Din to Homs. Nur ad-Din was fully in control of the city of Damascus and all of Syria. Mujir ad-Din later left Homs for Baghdad where he settled down and died.

== Sources ==
- Nicolle, David (2009). The Second Crusade 1148. Oxford: Osprey Publishing.

Regnal titles
Preceded by Jamal ad-Din Muhammad	Emir of Damascus; 1140–1154 with Mu'in ad-Din Unur (1140–1149)	Succeeded by Nur ad-Din Zangi
