= Tutush I =

Sultan of Damascus from 1092 to 1094

Ruler of Damascus
- Reign: 1078–1095
- Predecessor: Atsiz ibn Uvaq
- Successor: Shams al-Muluk Duqaq

Sultan of Aleppo
- Reign: 1094–1095
- Predecessor: Aq Sunqur al-Hajib
- Successor: Fakhr al-Mulk Ridwan
- Died: 25 February 1095; Ray, Seljuk Empire
- Spouse: Safwat al-Mulk
- Issue: Duqaq; Ridwan; Irtash
Names
- Abu Sa'id Taj al-Dawla Tutush
- Persian name: أبو سعيد تاج الدولة تتش
- House: Seljuk dynasty
- Father: Alp Arslan
- Religion: Sunni Islam

Abu Sa'id Taj al-Dawla Tutush (Arabic: أبو سعيد تاج الدولة تتش السلجوقي; died 25 February 1095) or Tutush I, was the Seljuk emir of Damascus from 1078 to 1092, and sultan of Damascus from 1092 to 1094.

== Years under Malik Shah ==
Tutush was a brother of the Seljuk sultan Malik-Shah I. In 1077, Malik-Shah appointed him to take over the governorship of Syria. Later that year, Tutush reached Aleppo, then ruled by the Mirdasid emir Sabiq ibn Mahmud, and began a three-month-long siege of the city.

In 1078/9, Malik-Shah sent him to Damascus to help Atsiz ibn Uvaq, an independent Turkish warlord who had taken the city in 1076, who was being besieged by the Fatimid forces. After the siege had ended, Tutush had Atsiz executed and installed himself in Damascus. He later expanded his realm by annexing Sidon, Gibelacar, Tiberias, Ramla, Jaffa and Jerusalem, which he granted to Artuk Bey, another Seljuk commander. He later returned to besieging Aleppo and called for reinforcements from Malik-Shah, yet his reinforcements were ambushed and routed by a coalition of Arab tribesmen led by Kilabi chief Abu Za'ida at Wadi Butnan. This forced him to leave Aleppo and to pursue the tribesmen who fled into the desert. Meanwhile, the Aleppines raided Tutush's camp outside the city walls, killing the guards he left behind and seizing all of its provisions. Tutush consequently withdrew to Diyar Bakr where he spent the winter. In 1080, Tutush determined to capture Aleppo by force, in which he wanted to strip it from its nearby defenses; hence, he seized Manbij, Hisn al-Faya (at modern-day al-Bira), Biza'a and Azaz. He later influenced Sabiq to cede the emirate to the Uqaylid emir Muslim ibn Quraysh "Sharaf al-Dawla".

The headman in Aleppo, Sharif Hassan ibn Hibat Allah Al-Hutayti, currently under siege by Suleiman ibn Qutalmish, promised to surrender the city to Tutush. Suleiman was a distant member of the Seljuk dynasty who had established himself in Anatolia and was trying to expand his rule to Aleppo, having captured Antioch in 1084. Tutush and his army met Suleiman's forces near Aleppo in 1086. In the ensuing battle of Ain Salm, Suleiman's forces fled, Suleiman was killed and his son Kilic Arslan captured. Tutush attacked and occupied Aleppo except for the citadel in May 1086, he stayed until October and left for Damascus due to the advance of Malik-Shah's armies. The Sultan himself arrived in December 1086, then he appointed Aq Sunqur al-Hajib as the governor of Aleppo. Tutush finished the construction of the Citadel of Damascus, a project begun under the direction of Atsiz.

== Struggle for Sultanate ==
Tutush took control of Syria in 1092, following the death of his brother, Malik-Shah, naming himself sultan. He marched towards Upper Mesopotamia, in which he managed to capture Nisbis, Amida, Mayyafariqin and Mosul, but he had to return in December 1093, as two Seljuk rulers, Bozan of Edessa and Harran and Aq Sunqur al-Hajib of Aleppo, had switched allegiance and declared their support for his nephew, Sultan Berkyaruq. However, Tutush along with Yağısıyan of Antioch launched an attack against the dissidents, whom he managed to defeat at Tell Sultan in June–July 1094. Bozan and Aq Sunqur were killed, meanwhile Kerbogha was taken prisoner to Homs.

Tutush, along with his general the Kakuyid Ali ibn Faramurz, headed east until he reached Hamadan, where Berkyaruq had withdrawn to Isfahan. However, Tutush was shortly defeated in a battle against Berkyaruq's forces near Ray, where he and Ali were killed on 25 February 1095. Tutush was decapitated and his head was displayed in Baghdad.

Tutush's younger son Duqaq then inherited Damascus, whilst Ridwan received Aleppo, splitting their father's realm. His youngest son Irtash was briefly ruler of Damascus in 1104.

== Sources ==
- Bianquis, Thierry (2012). "Mirdās, Banū or Mirdāsids". In Bosworth, C. E.; van Donzel, E.; Heinrichs, W. P. & Pellat, Ch. (eds.). The Encyclopaedia of Islam, Second Edition. Volume VII: Mif–Naz. Leiden: E. J. Brill. pp. 115–123. ISBN 978-90-04-09419-2.
- Bosworth, C. E. (1968). "The Political and Dynastic History of the Iranian World (A.D. 1000–1217)". In Boyle, John Andrew (ed.). The Cambridge History of Iran: The Saljuq and Mongol Periods. Vol. 5. Cambridge: Cambridge University Press. pp. 1–202. ISBN 0-521-06936-X.
- Bosworth, C. E. (2010). The History of the Seljuq State. Routledge. ISBN 9781136897436.
- Flood, Finbarr B. (2001). "A Group of Reused Byzantine Tables as Evidence for Seljuq Architectural Patronage in Damascus". Iran. 39: 145–154. doi:10.2307/4300602. JSTOR 4300602.
- Grousset, René (1970). The Empire of the Steppes: A History of Central Asia. Translated by Walford, Naomi. Rutgers University Press.
- Ibn al-Athir (2002). The Annals of the Saljuq Turks. Translated by Richards, D.S. Routledge.
- Maalouf, Amin (1985). The Crusades Through Arab Eyes. Schocken.
- Peacock, A. C. S. (2015). The Great Seljuk Empire. Edinburgh University Press. pp. 1–378. ISBN 9780748638260.
- Zakkar, Suheil (1969). The Emirate of Aleppo 392/1002–487/1094 (PDF) (PhD). London: University of London.

Regnal titles
Preceded by Atsiz ibn Uvaq	Emir of Damascus; 1079–1095	Succeeded by Duqaq
Preceded by Aq Sunqur al-Hajib	Sultan of Aleppo; 1094–1095	Succeeded by Radwan ibn Tausch
