= Shams al-Mulk Isma'il =

Ruler of Damascus (r. 1133–1135)

Atabeg of Damascus
- Reign: 1133 – 1135
- Predecessor: Taj al-Muluk Buri
- Successor: Shihab al-Din Mahmud
- Born: 1113
- Died: 1 February 1135 (aged 21–22); Damascus
Names
- Shams al-Mulk Isma'il
- House: Burid
- Father: Taj al-Muluk Buri
- Mother: Zumurrud
- Religion: Sunni Islam

Shams al-Mulk Isma'il (1113 – February 1, 1135) was the Burid atabeg (or Seljuk ruler) of the Emirate of Damascus from 1132 to 1135.

== Early life ==
Shams al-Mulk Isma'il, born in 1113, was the son of Taj al-Muluk Buri, the atabeg of Damascus, and his wife Zumurrud. Two Assassins wounded Buri in the stomach in May 1132 in revenge for the massacre of their fellows in Damascus. Buri suffered for 13 months before he died in June 1133. Ismail succeeded his father and decided to seize Banias, which had previously been taken by Baldwin II of Jerusalem with the Assassins' assistance. Ismail attacked Banias and captured it on 11 December 1132.

Ailba, a female slave of Ismail's grandfather, Toghtekin, made an attempt on Ismail's life in 1134. After being captured, she listed the names of many peoples who desired Ismail's death because of his tyrannical acts. He ordered the arrest of the alleged conspirators, including his half-brother, Sawinj, who starved to death in the prison. Fearing for his life, Ismail left Damascus and settled in the fortress of Salkhad. He also sent envoys to his father's old enemy, Imad ad-Din Zengi, the atabeg of Aleppo and Mosul, seeking his protection in exchange for Damascus.

Ismail was murdered on February 1, 1135. The author of the contemporaneous Damascus Chronicle of the Crusades accused Ismail's mother of ordering his servants to kill him, because Ismail also wanted to kill her lover. She appointed her younger son Shihab al-Din Mahmud to rule Damascus.

== Sources ==
- Barber, Malcolm (2012). The Crusader States. Yale University Press. ISBN 978-0-300-11312-9.
- Lock, Peter (2006). The Routledge Companion to the Crusades. Routledge. ISBN 9-78-0-415-39312-6.
- Maalouf, Amin (1984). The Crusades Through Arab Eyes. SAQI. ISBN 978-0-86356-023-1.
