= Jean Sauvaget =

- Born: 27 January 1901; Niort
- Died: 5 March 1950 (aged 49); Cambo-les-Bains, Pyrénées-Atlantiques, France
- Occupation(s): Historian; Orientalist

Jean Sauvaget (27 January 1901 – 5 March 1950) was a 20th-century French orientalist and historian of the Near and Middle East, professor at the Collège de France.

After studying at the Institut national des langues et civilisations orientales and graduating in Arabic at the Sorbonne, Sauvaget became a member (in 1924) then general secretary (in 1929) of the Institut français du Proche-Orient in Damascus. In 1937, he was elected at the École pratique des hautes études, director of studies in history of the Islamic East. He obtained the title of doctor of letters in 1941, and then taught lessons at the Institut national des langues et civilisations orientales, the École du Louvre as well as at the Université de Paris. In 1946, at the initiative of Paul Pelliot, he was elected professor at the Collège de France, Chair of History of the Arab world. His opening lecture of March 15, 1946 was published in Revue africaine.

== Sources ==
- Louis Robert, «Jean Sauvaget (1901-1950)», Revue historique, 76e année, t. CCVII, January–March 1952, p. 173-184.
- Louis Robert refers to obituaries published by Maurice Gaudefroy-Demombynes (1863-1957) in Syria, 27, 1950, (p. 383–385), as well as Régis Blachère (1900-1973) in the Journal asiatique, 239, 1951, (p. 1–4) and in the Annuaire de l'École des hautes études. Sciences historiques, 1950-1951, (p. 13–13).
