= Shams al-Muluk Duqaq =

Duqaq

Emir of Damascus
- Reign: 1095–1104
- Predecessor: Tutush I
- Successor: Tutush II
- Died: 8 June 1104
- Issue: Tutush II
- House: Seljuk dynasty
- Father: Tutush I
- Mother: Safwat al-Mulk

Abu Nasr Shams al-Muluk Duqaq (died 8 June 1104) was the Seljuq ruler of Damascus from 1095 to 1104.

== Reign ==
Duqaq was a son of the Seljuq ruler of Syria, Tutush I, and Safwat al-Mulk Khatun. He was the brother of Ridwan. When their father died in 1095, Ridwan claimed Syria for himself, and Duqaq initially inherited territory in the Jezirah and lived with his brother in Aleppo. However, he soon rebelled and seized control of Damascus, throwing Syria into near anarchy and civil war. Duqaq had the support of Yaghi-Siyan of Antioch, who had no quarrel with Ridwan but disliked his atabeg Janah ad-Dawla; joining Yaghi-Siyan and Duqaq was Ilghazi, governor of Jerusalem. Ridwan allied with Ilghazi's brother Sökmen of Artukids.

Ridwan attacked Yaghi-Siyan, and when Duqaq and Ilghazi came to assist him, Ridwan besieged Damascus as well. However, Ridwan soon quarrelled with Janah ad-Dawla, who captured Homs from him, and with his atabeg out of the alliance, Yaghi-Siyan was much more willing to assist him. This new alliance was sealed with a marriage between Ridwan and Yaghi-Siyan's daughter. The two were about to attack Shaizar when they heard of the arrival of the First Crusade; all the various alliances were disbanded and everyone returned to their own cities, though if any of the alliances had remained intact, or they had all worked together, they would likely have been able to prevent the success of the crusade.

Shown in red is the extent of Duqaq's territories within the broader political context in the Levant, c.1097 AD

Over the winter of 1097–1098, during the siege of Antioch by the Crusaders, Yaghi-Siyan and his son Shams ad-Dawla sought help from Duqaq. On December 30, 1097, reinforcements from Duqaq were defeated by the foraging party of Bohemund of Taranto, and Duqaq retreated to Homs. Duqaq later joined Kerbogha of Mosul to attack the crusaders after they had occupied Antioch in June 1098, but during the battle, Duqaq's line deserted and Kerbogha was defeated. While occupied in Syria, Duqaq's possessions in the Jezirah were seized by some rebellious vassals; in 1099 he recaptured Diyarbakr.

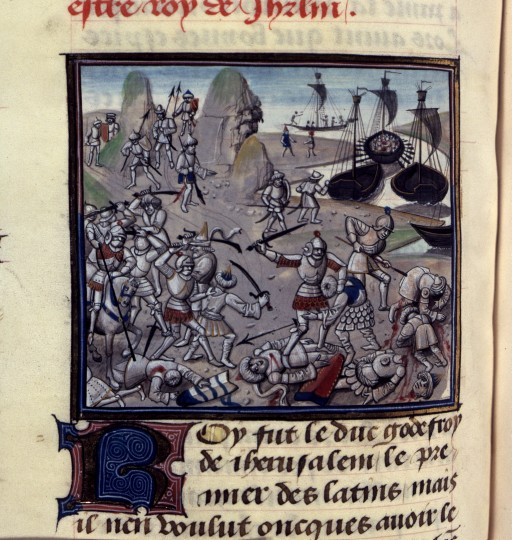
Battle of the Dog River (1100)

In 1100, Duqaq ambushed Baldwin I of Edessa at Nahr al-Kalb, outside Beirut, while the latter was on his way to Jerusalem to succeed his brother Godfrey of Bouillon as king. Baldwin's men held a narrow pass and Duqaq's troops were not able to break through. Baldwin was victorious and continued on to Jerusalem.

In 1103, Duqaq captured Homs when Janah ad-Dawla, Ridwan's former atabeg, was assassinated. Duqaq fell sick in 1104, and on the advice of his mother, appointed his own atabeg Toghtekin as atabeg to his young son Tutush II. Duqaq died on June 8 of that year. Toghtegin soon overthrew Duqaq's dynasty to establish the Burid dynasty, which would rule Damascus for the next half-century.

== Sources ==
- Setton, Kenneth M.; Baldwin, Marshall W., eds. (1969) [1955]. A History of the Crusades, Volume I: The First Hundred Years. Vol. 1 (Second ed.). Madison, Milwaukee, and London: University of Wisconsin Press. ISBN 0-299-04834-9.
- The Damascus Chronicle of the Crusades: Extracted and Translated from the Chronicle of Ibn al-Qalanisi. H.A.R. Gibb, London, 1932.

Regnal titles
| Preceded by Tutush I | Emir of Damascus; 1095–1104 | Succeeded by Tutush II |
