= Taj al-Muluk Buri =

Burid ruler of Damascus (r. 1128–1132)

Taj al-Muluk Buri تاج الملوك بوري

Atabeg of Damascus
- Reign: 1128 – 1132
- Predecessor: Zahir ad-Din Toghtekin
- Successor: Shams al-Mulk Isma'il
- Born: Damascus, Syria
- Died: 6 June 1132; Damascus, Syria
- Burial: Damascus
- Spouse: Zumurrud Khatun
- Issue: Shams al-Mulk Isma'il; Shihab al-Din Mahmud; Jamal ad-Din Muhammad
- Dynasty: Burid
- Father: Toghtekin
- Religion: Islam

Taj al-Muluk Buri (Arabic: تاج الملوك بوري; died 6 June 1132) was a Turkoman atabeg of Damascus from 1128 to 1132. He was initially an officer in the army of Duqaq, the Seljuk ruler of Damascus, together with his father Toghtekin. When the latter took power after Duqaq's death, Buri acted as regent and later became atabeg himself. Damascus's Burid dynasty was named after him.

== Biography ==
Buri is mentioned for the first time in 1099, when Duqaq sent him to take possession of Jableh, a town between Antioch and Tripoli which had rebelled against Fakhr al-Mulk ibn 'Ammar, qādī of Tripoli. Buri however acted as a despotic governor and the population appealed to Fakhr al-Mulk ibn 'Ammar, who captured him. Buri was however treated well and sent back to Damascus.

In 1102, Raymond of Saint-Gilles besieged Tripoli. Fakhr al-Mulk sued for help to Damascus, but in vain. In 1104 Duqaq died and the power went to his vizier Toghtekin. In 1108 Fakhr al-Mulk went to Baghdad to obtain help from caliph al-Mustazhir, accompanied by Buri. When the two returned in Damascus, they were informed that Tripoli had fallen into Crusaders' hands. In 1110, the eunuch al-Taj Gümüshtegin was deposed for intriguing against Buri's father; his domain around Baalbek was given to Buri.

In 1119, Buri led an army against king Baldwin II of Jerusalem, who had raided Adra'āt and halted him on a hill, where the Crusaders entrenched and stood against Buri's assault until he was crushed. On 25 January 1126, Buri fought with his father against the Crusaders at the battle of Marj al-Saffar, but they were defeated by Baldwin II. The Franks suffered heavy losses, and could not march against Damascus, which was then largely undefended.

Buri succeeded Toghtekin, uncontested, in February 1128. The following year, his vizier discovered an alleged plot set by the Assassins to deliver Damascus to the Crusaders. Baldwin II, who ignored that the plot had been brought to light, arrived with his army near Damascus and besieged it. The siege lasted until 5 December 1129, when the western troops were forced to retreat after heavy rains had turned the surroundings of the city into a marsh. In 1129, Buri assassinated the pro-Nizari vizier Abu Ali Tahir ibn Sa'id al-Mazadaqani. A general attack on the Assassins of Damascus occurred during the subsequent chaotic disorders and 6,000 or 10,000 of them were slain by the militia and the mob.

In 7 May 1131, two Assassins of Buri's personal guard, probably sent from Alamut for that purpose, tried to kill him, and he was severely wounded. Despite the care of Damascus' best physicians, he accelerated his convalescence. After riding a horse, his wound opened back, causing his death in 6 June 1132.

He was married to Zumurrud Khatun. He succeeded by his three sons Shams al-Mulk Isma'il, Shihab ed-Din Mahmud, and Jamal ad-Din Muhammad who fought one another over the inheritance.

Regnal titles
Preceded by Toghtekin	Atabeg of Damascus; 1128-1132	Succeeded by Shams al-Mulk Isma'il
