= Burid dynasty =

Medieval Turkish principality in Syria

Burid dynasty الدولة البورية
- 1104–1154
- Capital: Damascus
- Religion: Sunni Islam
- Government: Emirate
- Emir
  - 1104–1128: Toghtekin (first)
  - 1140–1154: Mujir ad-Din Abaq (last)
- History
  - Established: 1104
  - Disestablished: 1154
- Currency: Dinar
Preceded by	Succeeded by
Seljuks of Damascus	Zengid dynasty

The Burid dynasty (Arabic: الدولة البورية Romanized: ad-Dawlā al-Būriyā) or the Emirate of Damascus (Arabic: إمارة دمشق Romanized: Imarat Dimashq) was a Sunni Muslim dynasty of Oghuz Turkic origin which ruled over the Emirate of Damascus in the early 12th century, as subjects of the Seljuk Empire.

== History ==
The first Burid ruler, Toghtekin, began as a servant to the Seljuk ruler of Damascus, Duqaq. Following Duqaq's death in 1104, he seized the city for himself.

The dynasty was named after Toghtekin's son, Taj al-Muluk Buri. The Burids gained recognition from the Abbasid caliphs in return for considerable gifts. In return, the Caliphate did not interfere in the emirate.

The Burids ruled the city until 1154, when it was taken by the ruler of Aleppo, Nur ed-Din, founder of the Zengid dynasty.

The Burids lost to the Crusaders in the Battle of Marj al-Saffar (1126) but were able to prevent the Second Crusade from capturing Damascus.

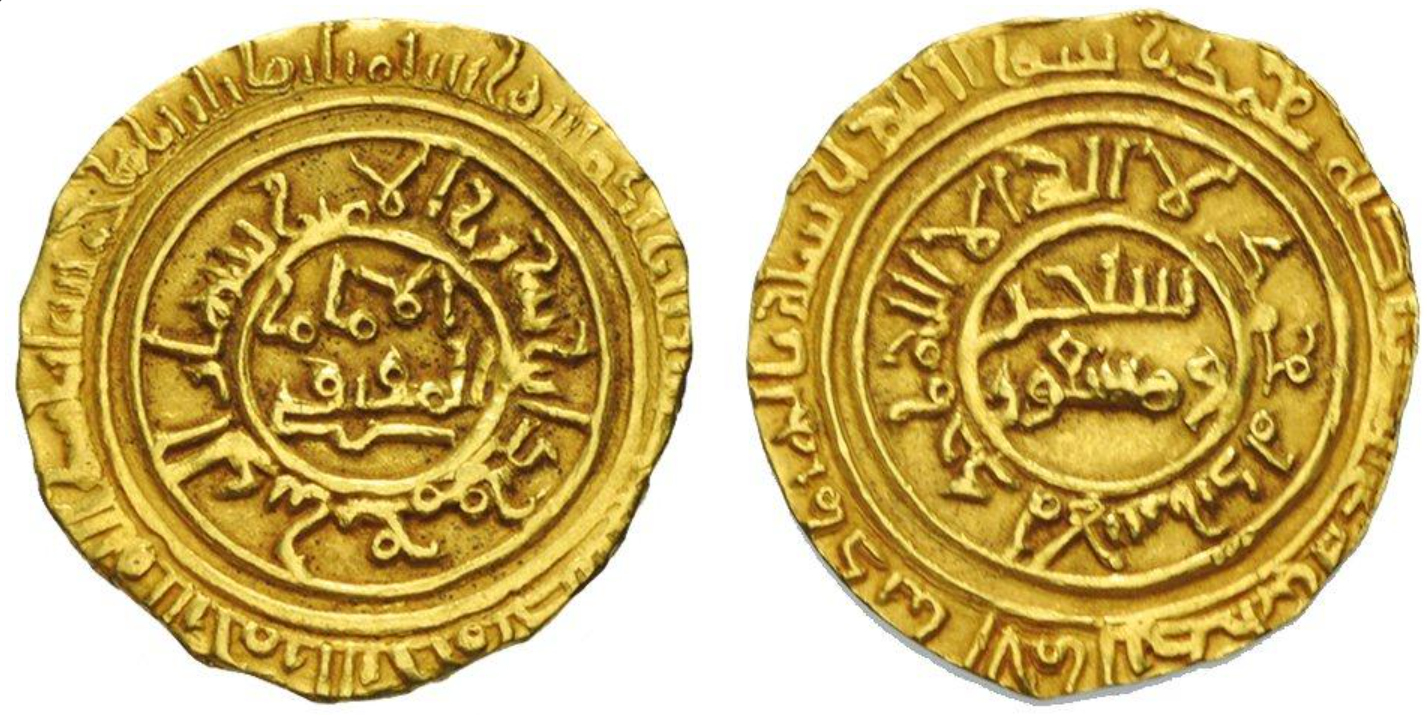
Coinage of the Burid ruler Shihab al-Din Mahmud (1135-1140). Dimashq mint, dated AH 533 (1138-9 CE). This coin gives Shihab al-Din’s full name and patronymic, as well as citing his Seljuq overlords, Sanjar and Mas‘ud, and the Abbasid caliph, al-Muqtafi (called here al-Imam, "the Priest").

== Burid emirs of Damascus ==
Titular Name(s) (Laqab)	Personal Name	Reign
Amir أمیر; Saif-ul-Islam سیف الاسلام	Zahir al-Din Toghtekin ظاھر الدین طغتکین	1104–1128
Amir أمیر	Taj al-Muluk Buri تاج الملک بوری	1128–1132
Amir أمیر	Shams al-Mulk Isma'il شمس الملک اسماعیل	1132–1135
Amir أمیر	Shihab al-Din Mahmud شھاب الدین محمود	1135–1139
Amir أمیر	Jamal al-Din Muhammad جمال الدین محمد	1139–1140
Amir أمیر	Mu'in al-Din Unur معین الدین أنر	1140–1149; Regent
Amir أمیر; Mujir-ud-din مجیر الدین	Abu Saʿid Ābaq ابو سعید ابق	1140–1154
Zengid dynasty replaces the Burid dynasty.

- Green shaded row signifies regency of Mu'in ad-Din Unur.

== Family Tree ==
Burid Dynasty

Zahir al-Din; Tughtekin^{(1)} r. 1104-1128
Taj al-Muluk; Buri^{(2)} r. 1128-1132
Shams al-Mulk; Isma'il^{(3)} r. 1132-1135	Shihab al-Din; Mahmud^{(4)} r. 1135-1139	Jamal al-Din; Muhammad^{(5)} r. 1139-1140
Mujir al-Din; Abaq^{(6)} r. 1140-1154

== See also ==
- List of Sunni Muslim dynasties
