= After the First Crusade, 1099–1146 =

The Period after the First Crusades from 1109 to 1146

- Part of the Crusades
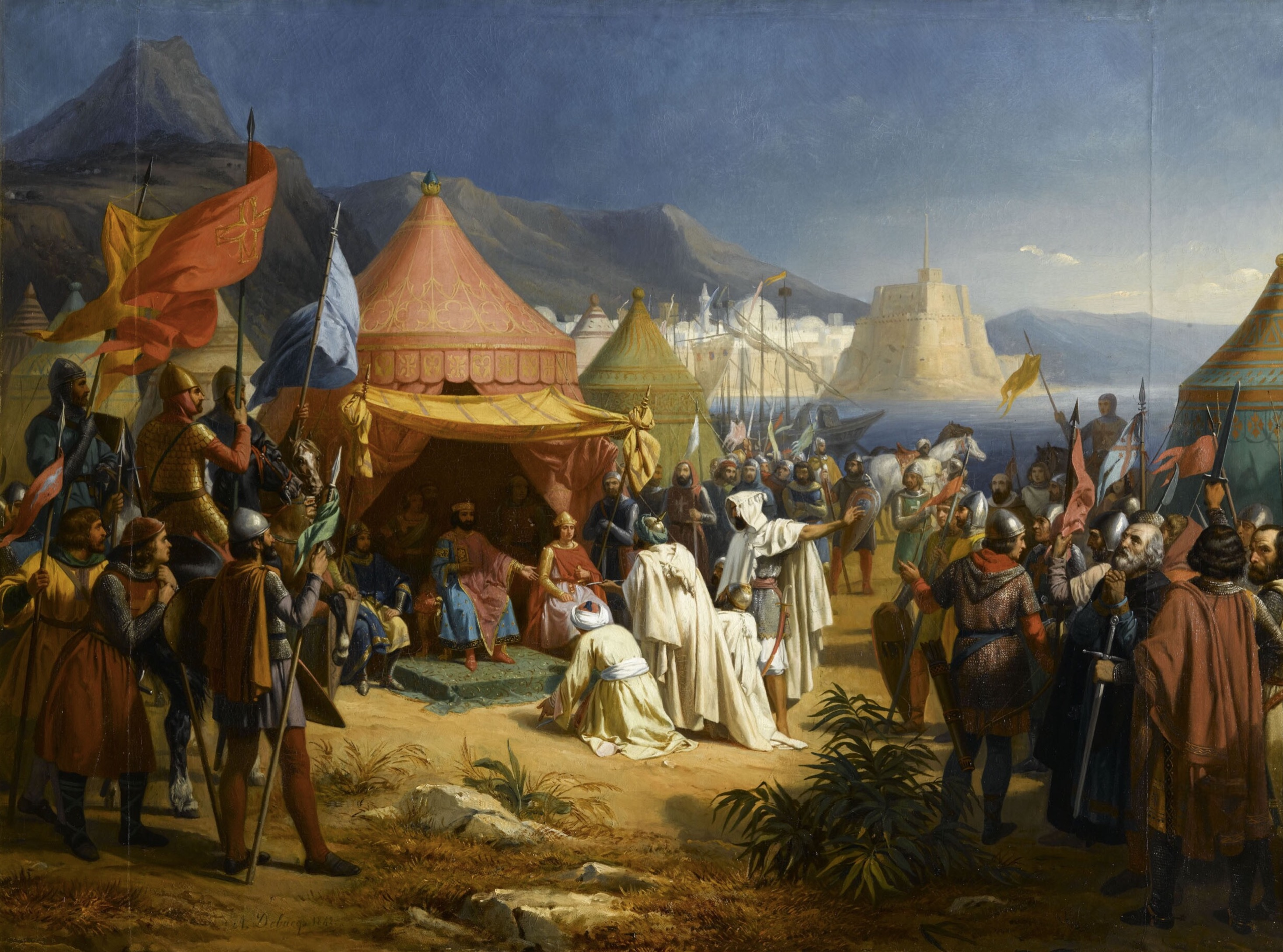
- Tripoli submitting to Bertrand of Toulouse. Painting by Charles-Alexandre Debacq, 1842
| Date | 1099–1146 |
| Location | Kingdom of Jerusalem, Egypt, Syria |
| Result | Loss of a key Frankish city resulting in the Second Crusade |

Belligerents
| Rulers of Jerusalem; Godfrey of Bouillon; Baldwin I Baldwin II; Fulk of Jerusalem; Melisende of Jerusalem; Baldwin III | Fatimids caliphs al-Musta'li al-Amir al-Hafiz; Seljuk sultans Malik-Shah; Tutush |

Commanders and leaders
| Kingdom of Jerusalem; Raymond of Saint-Gilles; Robert Curthose; Robert II of Flanders; Gerard of Avesnes; Roger of Apulia; Warner of Grez; Geldemar Carpenel; Hugh of Fauquembergues; Fulk of Guînes; Eustace Grenier; Robert the Leper; Rainald I Masoir; Waleran of Le Puiset; William of Bures; Joveta; Patriarchs; Arnulf of Chocques; Daimbert of Pisa; Maurice of Porto; Evremar; Ghibbelin of Arles; Warmund of Picquigny; County of Edessa; Joscelin I of Edessa; Joscelin II of Edessa; Thoros of Edessa; Baldwin of Marash; Arda of Armenia; Richard of Salerno; Hugh of Edessa; Basil bar Shumna; Principality of Antioch; Bohemond of Taranto; Tancred of Galilee; Alice of Antioch; Constance of Antioch; Raymond of Poitiers; Bohemond II of Antioch; Roger of Salerno; Geoffrey the Monk; County of Tripoli; William II Jordan; Bertrand of Toulouse; Pons of Tripoli; Raymond II of Tripoli; Western Europeans; Guglielmo Embriaco; Hugh Embriaco; Sigurd I of Norway; Ordelafo Faliero; Domenico Michiel; Knights Templar; Hugues de Payens; Bernard of Clairvaux; Robert de Craon; Knights Hospitaller; Blessed Gerard; Raymond du Puy; Byzantine Empire; Alexios I Komnenos; John II Komnenos; Manuel I Komnenos; Armenian Cilicia; Gabriel of Melitene; Kogh Vasil; Leo I of Armenia; Kingdom of Georgia; David IV the Builder | Abbasid caliphs Al-Mustazhir; Al-Mustarshid; Al-Muqtafi; Fatimid Egypt; Al-Afdal Shahanshah; Sa'd al-Dawla al-Qawwasi; Sama' al-Mulk Husayn; Al-Ma'mun al-Bata'ihi; Seljuk sultanate Nizam al-Mulk; Berkyaruq; Muhammad I Tapar; Mahmud II; Ahmad Sanjar; Sultanate of Rum; Suleiman ibn Qutalmish; Kilij Arslan I Danishmends; Danishmend Gazi; Gazi Gümüshtigin; Emir Gazi; Damascus; Duqaq; Toghtekin; Buri; Yusuf ibn Firuz; Bazawash; Shams al-Mulk Isma'il; Mu'in ad-Din Unur; Aleppo; Aq Sunqur al-Hajib; Ridwan; Alp Arslan al-Akhras; Lu'lu' al-Yaya; Sultan Shah; Ibn al-Khashshab; Ilghazi; Belek Ghazi; Timurtash; Mosul; Kerbogha; Jikirmish; Jawali Saqawa; Mawdud; Aqsunqur al-Bursuqi; Zengids; Imad al-Din Zengi; Sawar ibn Aytegin; Zumurrud Khatun; Nur al-Din; Seljuks/Artuqids; Sökmen; Rukn al-Dawla Da'ud; Janah ad-Dawla; Kara Arslan; Timurtash; Bursuq ibn Bursuq; Arab tribes Fakhr al-Mulk ibn Ammar; Sultan ibn Munqidh; Sadaqa; Dubays ibn Sadaqa; Turkic tribes Sökmen el-Kutbî; Assassins; Hassan-i Sabbah; Bahram al-Da'i |

In the period after the First Crusade from 1099–1146, the Kingdom of Jerusalem was established and, with the other Crusader states, grew to be a major force in the Holy Land. Despite being surrounded by hostile Muslim forces, the kingdom gradually conquered all but one of the major Mediterranean coastal cities and much of the interior lands. Godfrey of Bouillon and Baldwin I of Jerusalem, the first rulers of the kingdom, quelled the Fatimid Egyptian threat and reached a stalemate with the Seljuks of northern Syria. The uniting of the major Syrian cities of Aleppo, Damascus and Mosul under the warlord Zengi led to the loss of Edessa and the coming of the Second Crusade.

== Beginnings ==
On 15 July 1099, Jerusalem was claimed for Christianity, reaching the major goal of the First Crusade. The originator of the crusade, Urban II, died on 29 July, not knowing that his venture had been successful. He was succeeded by Pascal II, who would serve 20 years.

=== Advocatus Sancti Sepulchri ===
Following the return of the Holy City to Christianity, the nobles and clergy set about to determine the governance of the city. On 22 July 1099, a council was held to establish a ruler for Jerusalem. The clergy wanted an ecclesiastical solution, but there was no obvious canditate and so a secular solution was sought. Raymond of Saint-Gilles and Godfrey of Bouillon were recognized as the leaders of the First Crusade most suited to lead what was to become the kingdom.

The account of Raymond of Aguilers in his Historia Francorum qui ceperunt Iherusalem states:

[A]fter six or seven days the princes solemnly began to consider the matter of choosing a ruler, who, assuming charge of all matters. While this was taking place, some of the clergy assembled and said to the princes, "We approve your election, but if you proceed rightly and properly, you will first choose a spiritual vicar, as eternal matters come before temporal; after this, a ruler to preside over secular matters. Otherwise, we shall hold invalid whatever you do." The princes were exceedingly angered when they heard this and proceeded the more quickly with the election. The clergy had been weakened by the departure of Lord Adhemar, Pontiff of Puy, who, in his life had held our army together with holy deeds and words. The princes urged the Count of St. Gilles to accept the kingdom. But he said that he abhorred the name of king in that city, though he would consent to have others accept it. For this reason they together chose the Duke [Godfrey of Bouillon] and placed him in charge of the Sepulchre of the Lord.

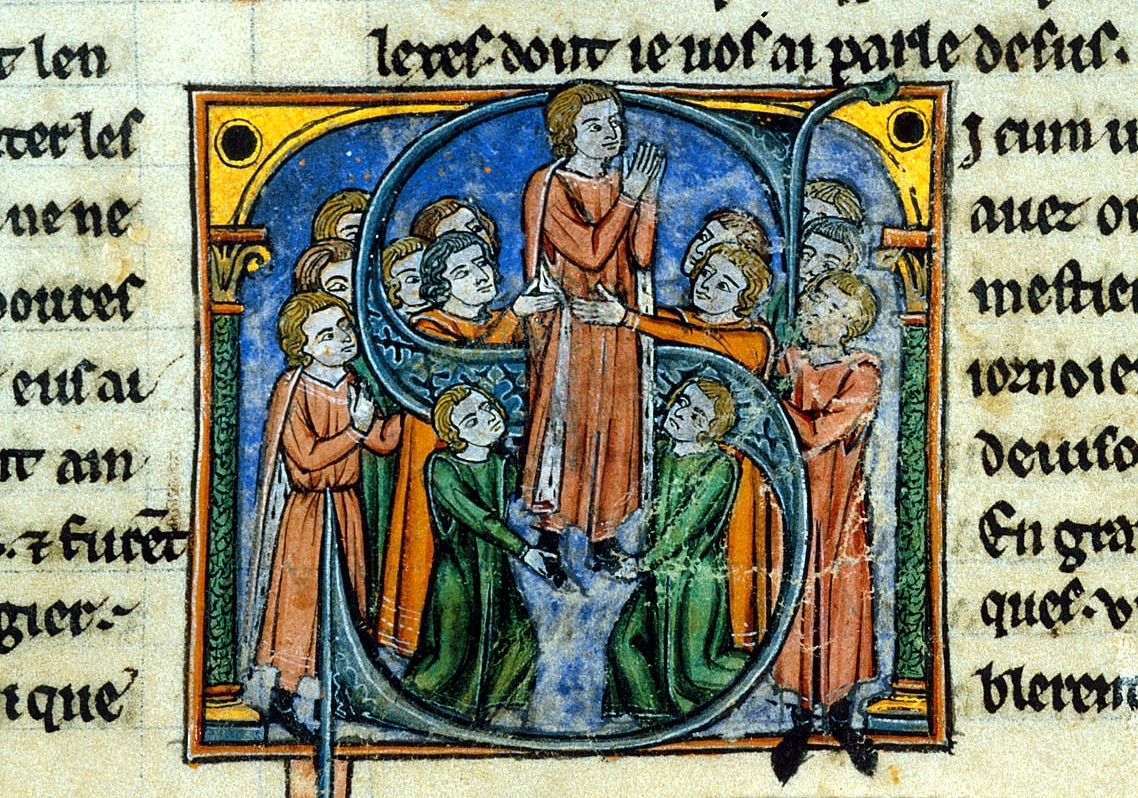
Godfrey of Bouillon being created the Lord of the city. From the Histoire d'Outremer by William of Tyre.

Raymond was the more likely candidate of the two, but his reputation had been tarnished after his failed Siege of Arqa. Nevertheless, he refused to become king, possibly hoping that the other nobles would insist upon his election. Godfrey, a descendant of Charlemagne, did not hesitate and he accepted the position as ruler of the Holy City. He took the title Advocatus Sancti Sepulchri (defender of the Holy Sepulchre) although there are indicators that he used the more ambiguous term princeps, or simply retained his title of dux from Lower Lorraine. Raymond was incensed and took his army to forage away from the city. He was reluctant to give up the Tower of David, but eventually was forced to by Godfrey.

=== Latin patriarchy and the sacred relic ===
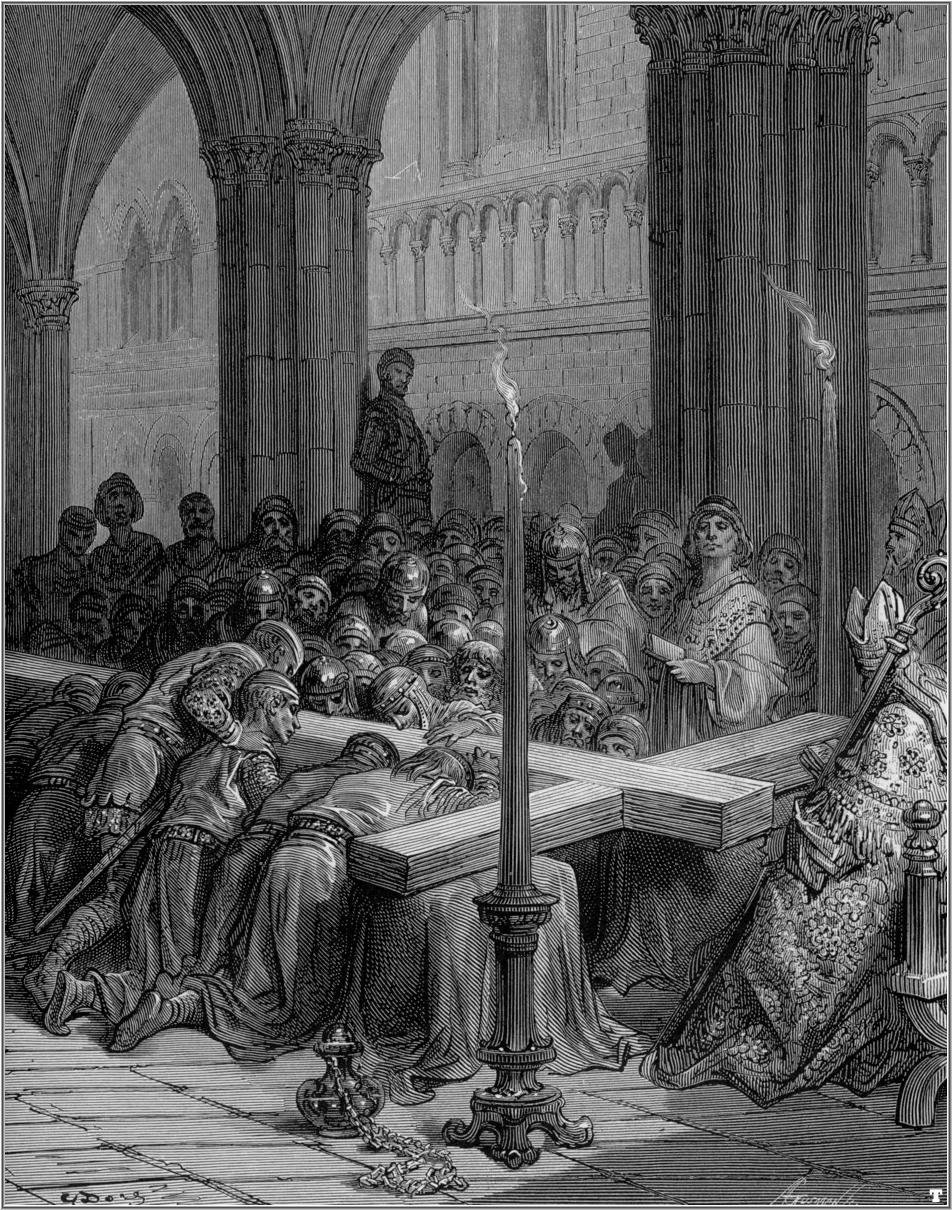
The Discovery of the True Cross, Gustave Doré (1832-1883)

There remained the issue of the clergy leadership. The obvious choice had been Simeon II of Jerusalem, in exile at Cyprus, but he had died a few days earlier. On 1 August 1099, Arnulf of Chocques was elected as the first Latin Patriarch of Jerusalem despite his relative low standing in the church hierarchy. With him throughout the crusade, Arnulf's loyalty lay with Godfrey and he would not pressure him in matters of governance.

On 5 August 1099, Arnulf discovered the relic of the True Cross. First found by Saint Helena in the fourth century, it had changed hands many times over the centuries. Since the 1009 destruction of the Church of the Holy Sepulchre, ordered by Fatimid caliph al-Hakim bi-Amr Allah in 1009, the relic was hidden by the Greek Orthodox priests of the city. Even with the return of Jerusalem to Christian hands, the protectors of the cross were reluctant to part with it. Arnulf forced them to reveal its location and it became the most sacred relic of the kingdom. The patriarch or the king would carry the True Cross with them when in battle with the Muslims.

=== Princes of Outremer ===
While most of the Crusaders would return home at the end of the First Crusade, three leaders would stay and shape the future of the kingdom and Outremer. They are Bohemond of Taranto, his nephew Tancred of Galilee, and Godfrey's brother Baldwin of Boulogne.

The animosity between Bohemond of Taranto and Byzantine emperor Alexios I Komnenos dated back to the 1080s when they opposed each other in the Byzantine-Norman wars. Nevertheless, when he joined the First Crusade, Bohemond to an oath of homage to the emperor as was required by all Crusaders. It was understood that Byzantine lands that were recovered would revert to the empire. Bohemond was a key leader in the Siege of Antioch of 1097–1098 and wanted control of the city after its submission. Raymond of Saint-Gilles opposed giving the city to Bohemond instead supporting Alexios' claim. Bohemond would not yield given that the emperor did not come to the aid of the Crusaders during the siege. He prevailed and become the first ruler of the Principality of Antioch.

Bohemond's nephew Tancred initially refused to take an oath to the emperor, but relented after the 1097 Siege of Nicaea. Afterwards, his contingent split off from the main force and conquered several cities in Armenian Cilicia before rejoining Godfrey and Raymond at Antioch and later Jerusalem. He joined with Baldwin of Bourcq, cousin of Baldwin of Boulogne, in taking Bethlehem and, with the acquisition of Tiberias, formed the Principality of Galilee. This area had been contested by Egypt and Damascus, and so was a vital area to control.

When Tancred left the main body of Crusaders, he was accompanied by Baldwin of Boulogne. Tancred tried to capture Tartus, but was prevented by Baldwin, giving rise to a lifelong rivalry. Baldwin was invited by the local warlord Thoros of Edessa to come to Edessa to help fight the Seljuks. After much intrigue, he created the first Crusader state, the County of Edessa, on 10 March 1098. He solidified his rule by marrying a local woman Arda of Armenia, the daughter of an Armenian ruler. Baldwin played an important role in supporting the main Crusader force by engaging Kerbogha at Edessa, delaying his attack on Antioch in 1098.

== Threats to the kingdom ==
The kingdom was surrounded by hostile Muslim countries from the beginning. Furthermore, the Egyptian navy was powerful, controlling the Mediterranean coastline. The caliphates, sultanates and dynasties in the Levant were most times enemies of Jerusalem, but, at times, allied with the Franks. The Seljuk Turks in Syria fought frequently among themselves, giving advantage to the Franks.

The Islamic military order of the Assassins was not a threat to the Franks in this time period, but rather attacked other Muslim rulers. Founded in 1090 by the Arab religious scholar Hassan-i Sabbah, they occasionally allied with Christian leaders and did not list them among their victims until 1191.

=== Fatimid caliphate of Egypt ===
The Fatimid caliphate had ruled Egypt and surrounding areas since the year 909. Beginning in 1094, the caliph was al-Musta'li, supported by his vizier al-Afdal Shahanshah. In August 1098, al-Afdal captured Jerusalem from the Seljuk Turks only to lose it to the Crusaders the next year.

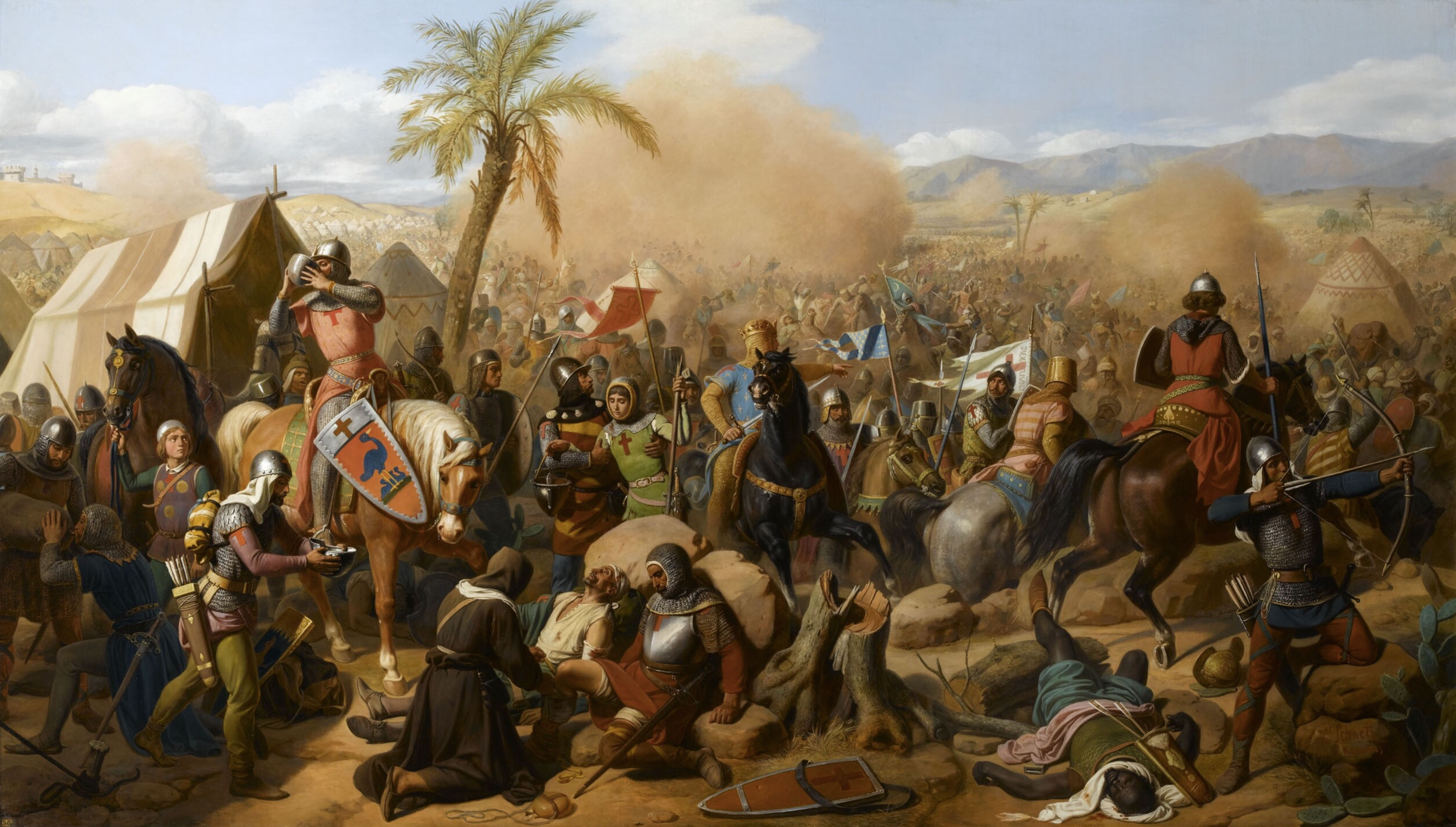
Battle of Ascalon, 12 August 1099, Jean-Victor Schnetz, 1847

The Fatimids were a constant threat to the kingdom from the beginning, covering its southern reaches. Following the loss of Jerusalem, al-Afdal launched the Battle of Ascalon in an attempt to drive the Franks from the region. While defeated, the Muslim garrison at Ascalon would only surrender to Raymond of Saint-Gilles, which was unacceptable to Godfrey. Ascalon would remain in Muslim hands until the Frankish success in 1153 in the Siege of Ascalon.

Al-Afdal would be felled by an Assassin's blade in December 1121 and the caliphate was no longer a significant threat to the Frankish settlements. The Fatimids would fall to Saladin in 1171, giving rise to the Ayyubid sultanate.

=== Seljuk empire ===
The Seljuk empire was founded by the Oghuz Turk warlord Seljuk Beg in the early eleventh century played an important part in the history of the Crusades. It was his great-grandson was Alp Arslan who defeated the Byzantines at the seminal Battle of Manzikert in 1071. His son and successor was Malik-Shah I who conquered much of Syria, including Aleppo, Antioch and Edessa. Malik-Shah's brother was Tutush I who ruled Damascus. The rivalry between the brothers caused the first rift in the Seljuk dynasty.

Anatolia at the beginning of the First Crusade (1097)

Malik-Shah ruled from 15 December 1072 through 19 November 1092. His vizier was Nizam al-Mulk who also supported his father and grandfather. Their deaths in 1092 led to civil war with Tutush contesting the succession of Malik-Shah's son Berkyaruq. Tutush was killed in battle in 1095 and his head displayed in Baghdad. Berkyaruq was succeeded by his half-brother Muhammad I Tapar.

Tutush ruled Damascus and was sultan of Aleppo from 1094. He was succeeded in Aleppo by his son Ridwan and in Damascus by his younger son Duqaq. Following Duqaq's death in 1104, Damascus was ruled first by Toghtekin and then his son Taj al-Muluk Buri, founders of the Burid dynasty. Aleppo was ruled by Ridwan's son Alp Arslan al-Akhras after his death in 1113, but the real power rested in the hands of al-Akhras' atabeg Lu'lu' al-Yaya.

The Seljuks lived in harmony with the Abbasid caliphate. The caliphs, based in Baghdad, were the spiritual figureheads with the Seljuks providing the military might beginning in 1055.

=== Sultanate of Rum ===
The Seljuk Sultanate of Rum seceded from the Seljuk empire in 1077 and was led by Suleiman ibn Qutalmish. His father Qutalmish had struggled with his cousin Alp Arslan for the throne but was defeated at the Battle of Damghan in 1063. The sultanate was recoginized as a vassal state to the Seljuks by Malik-Shah in 1084 and worked closely with the emperor Alexios I Komnenos in their attempts to reconquer Antioch. Suleiman's son Kilij Arslan I succeeded him in 1092.

Kilij Arslan was the key antagonist against the Franks during the First Crusade and Crusade of 1101. After his death in 1107, the sultanate concentrated on battling its Muslim rivals and was taken the Mongols in 1243.

=== Artuqid dynasty ===
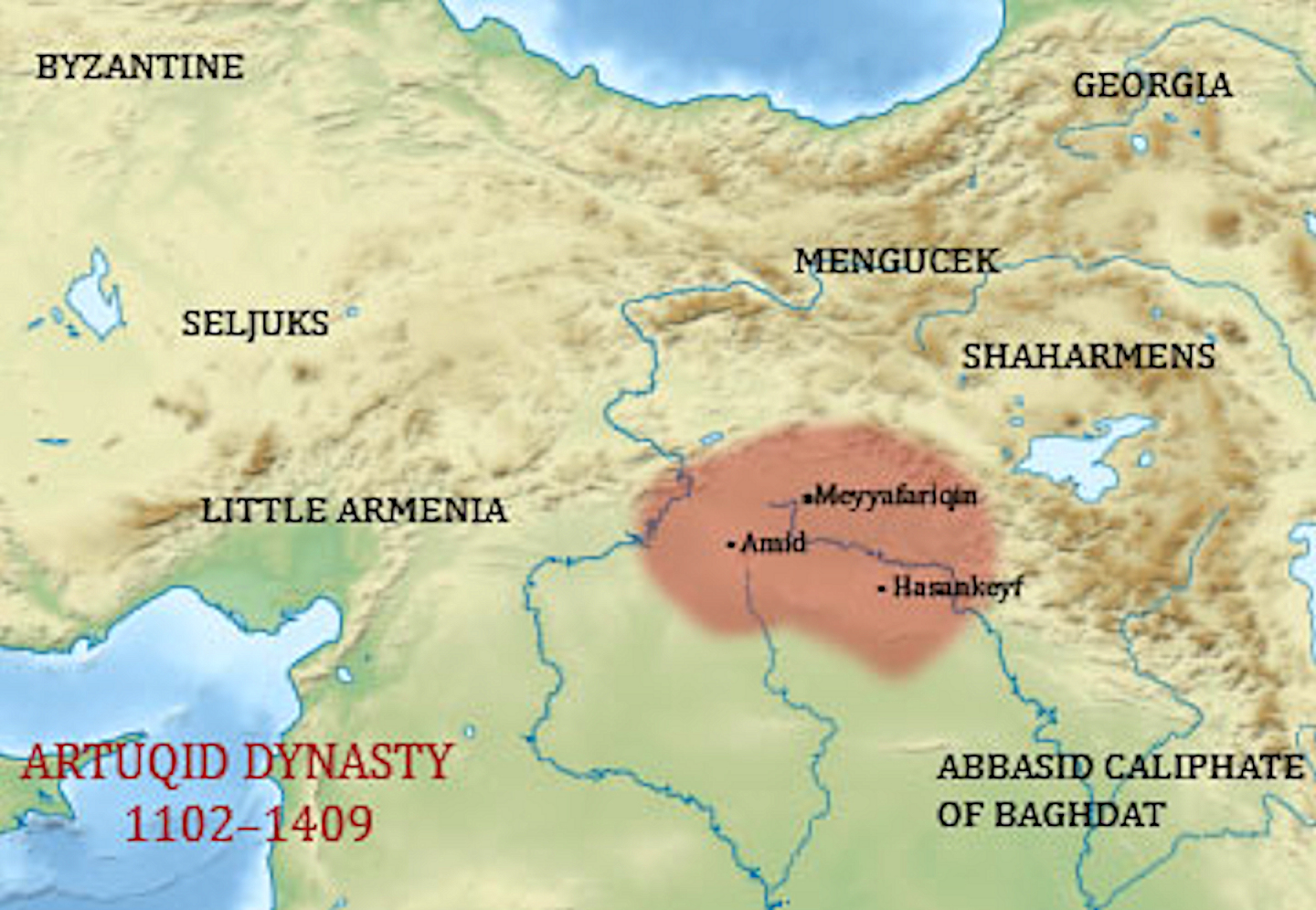
Artuqid dynasty

The Artuqid dynasty was formed by Artuk Bey, a Turkish general first under Malik-Shah and then Tutush. It was a principality of the Seljuk empire. Artuk was appointed governor of Jerusalem by Tutush in 1085. Upon his death in 1091, Artuk's sons Sökmen and Ilghazi assumed the governance of the Holy City and ruled until 1098 when they were expelled by al-Afdal. Ilghazi was emir of Aleppo beginning in 1117 and Sökmen ruled the region around Hasankeyf. The Artuqids became a vassal of the Zengids after 1146.

=== Danishmends ===
The Danishmendid beylik was founded in 1071 by Danishmend Gazi, an Armenian who was rumored to be related to Malik-Shah. Formed after the Battle of Manzikert, Gazi took advantage of the death of Suleiman ibn Qutalmish to carve out his domain of interest. He died in 1085 and was succeeded by his son Gazi Gümüshtigin. Gazi died in 1104 and was succeeded by his son Emir Gazi. The dynasty remained active until 1179.

== Establishment of the early kingdom ==
After Ascalon, Raymond of Saint-Gilles, Robert Curthose and Robert II of Flanders left Jerusalem with their armies to return home, going north through Antioch. This left the kingdom virtually defenseless, only some 300 knights and 2000 infantry, with still much of Palestine to conquer.

=== Diambert of Pisa ===
Daimbert was archbishop of Pisa and papal legate to the First Crusade. At the end of 1098, he traveled east with a Pisan fleet of 120 ships, conducting raids on Byzantine islands before going on to Syria. In August 1099, Bohemond began besieging the Byzantine port of Latakia, and Diambert and the Pisans agreed to blockade the port by sea. Raymond and the two Roberts saw the necessity for cooperation with the emperor and persuaded Daimbert to call off the blockade. Bohemond abandoned his siege and accompanied the legate and Baldwin of Boulogne to Jerusalem, arriving on 21 December 1099.

In late December, Arnulf of Chocques was deposed from his patriarchy and Daimbert was elected in his place with strong support by Bohemond. Public opinion had always held that the Holy Land should be the under the rule of the church, but Arnulf had been too weak to establish supremacy. Daimbert's position was stronger, as he was papal legate and had the support of the Pisans. After his enthronement, Godfrey knelt before him and was invested with the territory of Jerusalem. Bohemond did the same for Antioch, but Baldwin did not do that for Edessa.

=== Stalemate at Arsuf ===
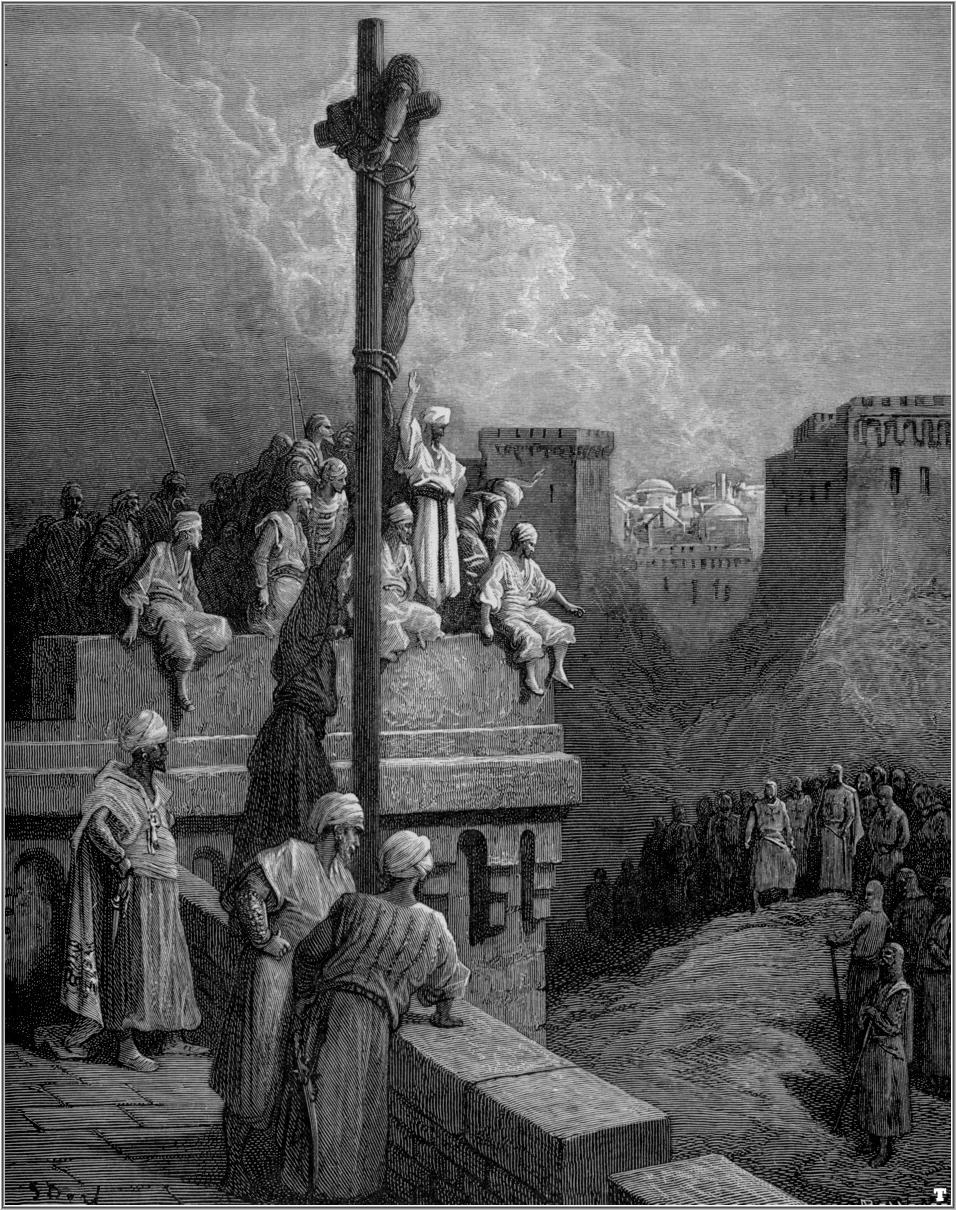
Gerard of Avesnes exposed on the walls of Arsuf. Illustration by Gustave Doré (1877)

After the fall of Jerusalem, Godfrey had arranged with the citizens of the Fatimid city of Arsuf for the exchange of hostages and a tribute payment in lieu of conquest. One of these hostages was Godfrey's knight, Gerard of Avesnes, whom he wished released. Arsuf reneged on this treaty and in late October 1099, Godfrey began his Siege of Arsuf. Arsuf was well-fortified and multiple siege engines were brought to her walls. Unfortunately, the Franks had no naval support, making their task insurmountable.

While pummeling the city with catapults, Gerard was hung from a ship's mast in view of the Frankish attackers. Despite Gerard's pleas, Godfrey continued the siege. When one of his siege towers caught fire, Godfrey had no choice but to abandon the siege on 15 December 1099. The Arsuf garrison offered to surrender only to Raymond of Saint-Gilles, Godfrey refused and retreated to Ramla.

In mid-March 1100, the Fatimids sent additional troops to Arsuf. Emboldened, the garrison of the city counterattacked the Franks. They were decimated, causing the city fathers to sue for peace, offering a tribute and full access to the Franks on 25 March. Godfrey accepted and gave the city rights to one of his knights, Robert of Apulia. Surprisingly, despite his wounds, Gerard survived the ordeal and returned to Jerusalem with the army.

=== Death of Godfrey of Bouillon ===
The emirs of Ascalon, Caesarea and Acre soon followed Arsuf's lead and provided tribute to Godfrey, and Jaffa surrendered to the Crusaders without a fight. While his standing with the indigenous Muslims had increased, he was not strong enough to counter the combined military strength of Bohemond, Tancred and, through the Pisan fleet, Daimbert. Not content to be in the shadows of Godfrey, Daimbert was granted one-fourth of the city of Jaffa on 2 February 1100. The patriarch pushed for more and on 1 April, Easter Day, was granted the whole of Jerusalem upon Godfrey's death.

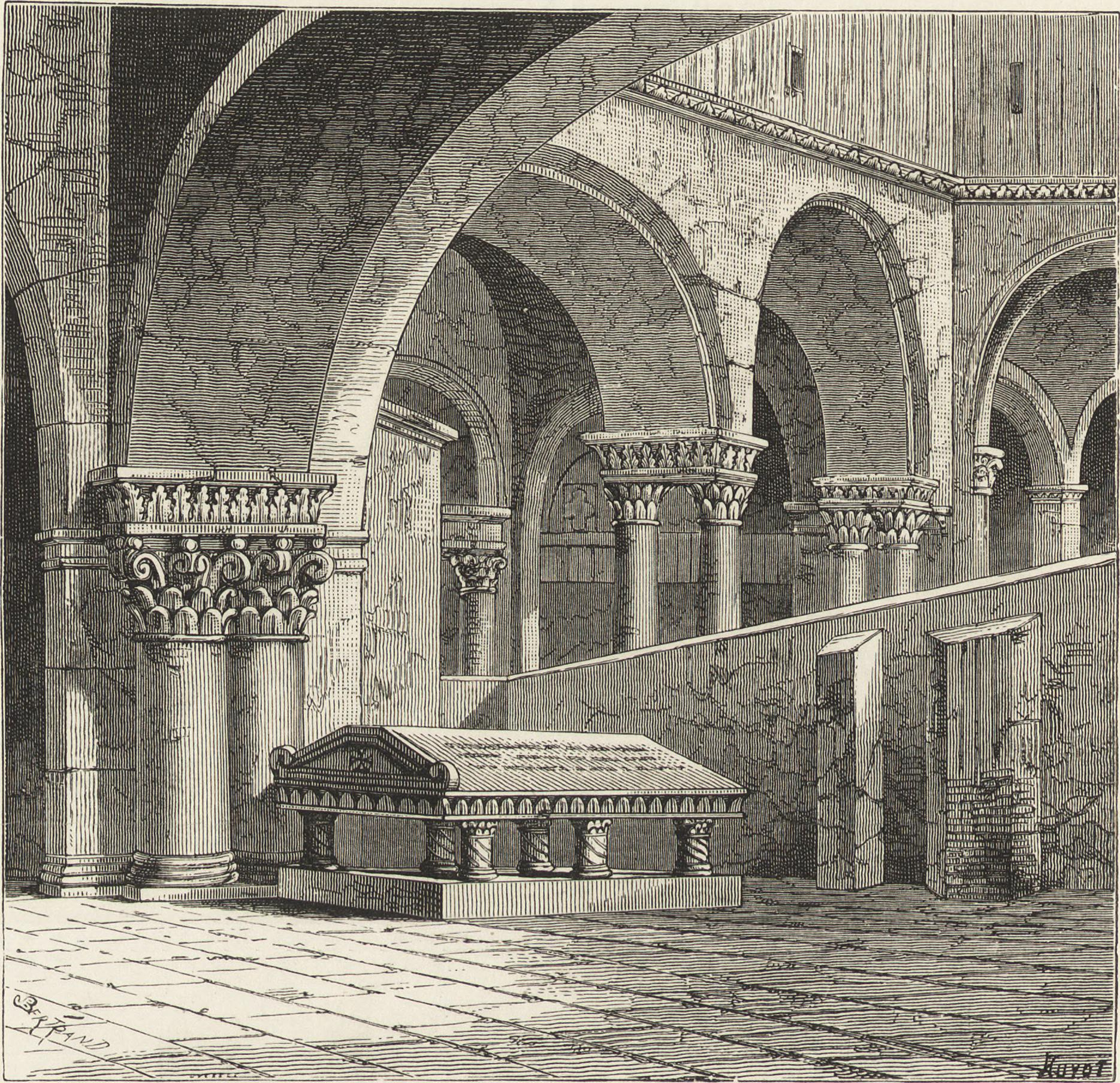
Cenotaph of Godfrey of Bouillon in the Church of the Holy Sepulchre (1870, after a 15th-century woodcut)

The kingdom was considering an assault on Acre. It was on or about 18 June 1100 that Godfrey learned that a large Venetian fleet had arrived at Jaffa, he traveled to meet them. After a large meal at Caesarea, he went on to Jaffa. Feeling ill, he returned to Jerusalem but deputized his relative and loyal companion Warner of Grez to deal with the Venetians. The Venetians wanted a one-third stake in any city they helped capture plus the whole of Tripoli. In return, they would support the Franks through 15 August. Their proposal was accepted by Warner and Godfrey.

The decision was made to attack Acre and, on 13 July, Tancred, Daimbert and Warner, in command of Godfrey's forces, deployed to Jaffa. Feeling ill, Warner returned to Jerusalem. Shortly thereafter, on 18 July 1100, Godfrey of Bouillon died. He lay in-state for five days and was interned at the Church of the Holy Sepulchre. Warner and other loyalists secured the Tower of David and other key sites within the city and sent word to Godfrey's brother Baldwin of Boulogne to return to Jerusalem.

=== Victory at Haifa ===
The Venetian fleet, Daimbert, Tancred and their armies were at Jaffa when word came from Jerusalem of Godfrey's death. Plans were changed and the invading force was redirected to Haifa. The Siege of Haifa began on 25 July 1100 and included a large siege tower and seven mangonels. The Fatimid garrison stationed there was assisted by the large Jewish community in residence and responded to their attackers with boiling oil and burning straw. After fifteen days, the Franks and Venetians were repelled.

The Venetians lost a ship in the melee and retreated. Further, Tancred when learned that Haifa had been promised to Geldemar Carpenel by Godfrey he planned to withdraw. He was persuaded to continue and finally on 20 August 1100, the citadel was breached and the attacking force streamed into the city. The resulting massacre included both the defending soldiers and civilians, sparing no one. The Venetians took their loot and returned home. Tancred, with the larger force, expelled Geldemar and his men from the city.

=== Bohemond's capture at Meletine ===
After the fighting was completed at Haifa, Daimbert and Tancred confered on the future of Jerusalem. They decided to support the elevation of Bohemond to the crown at Jerusalem and sent a letter to the prince with that message. Unbeknownst to them, Bohemond had been a captive of the Danishmendids since mid-August and had not heard of Godfrey's death.

After being invested in Antioch, Bohemond had allied with the Armenian Cilicians, in particular Gabriel of Melitene. In mid-August 1100, Gabriel and his men were ambushed by a scouting party led by Gazi Gümüshtigin, and Bohemond with a relief force marched to assist. In the ensuing Battle of Melitene, they were ambushed by Gazi, and most of the force was killed including the Armenian bishops of Antioch and Marash. Bohemond and Roger of Salerno were captured and held for ransom.

Hearing of the captives, Baldwin rushed to Melitene from Edessa with a small force of 150 knights, but was unable to rescue them. After three days, he returned to Meletine where he was welcomed by Gabriel and the city was placed under the protection of Edessa. Bohemond was held until 1103 until finally ransomed. Meletine fell to the Turks that same year and Gabriel was executed. Tancred was named prince of Antioch, temporarily giving up Galilee.

=== Baldwin I becomes king ===
It was when Baldwin returned to Edessa at the end of August 1100 that he learned of his brother's death. Appointing his cousin, now Baldwin II of Edessa, as count, he spent September preparing for his journey to Jerusalem. On 2 October, he and his household, accompanied by a bodyguard of two hundred knights, set out first to Antioch, then to Jaffa and Latakia. The group stopped at Tripoli where the qadi Fakhr al-Mulk ibn Ammar, no friend of the Damascene emir Duqaq, provided supplies and a warning of an impending attack.

Leaving Tripoli and approaching Beirut, Baldwin neared the Nahr al-Kalb river where Duqaq and his men were waiting in ambush. Having been warned by the Tripoli emir, he proceeded cautiously and confronted Duqaq's force. Unable to cross the river, he camped for the night and the next day, engaged the Muslim enemy at the Battle of the Dog River. The resulting rout of the Damascene forces allowed Baldwin to proceed.

On 31 October 1100, Baldwin's entourage reached Haifa, which was controlled by Tancred, and so they did not enter the city. However, Tancred was in Jerusalem with Daimbert trying to wrest the Tower of David from its loyalist occupiers. Hearing of Baldwin's approach, Tancred hurried to Jaffa to try to prevent his entry to the city. The citizens of Jaffa rose up and drove Tancred out, welcoming Baldwin who was greeted as a hero. Without delay, Baldwin departed and arrived at Jerusalem on 9 November 1100.

Baldwin was met outside the walls of the city and ceremonously escorted in. Daimbert retired to a monastery on Mount Zion, but eventually made peace with the future king. At the Church of the Nativity in Bethlehem, Baldwin I of Jerusalem was crowned as king by Daimbert on Christmas Day 1100.

== Crusade of 1101 ==
With the success of First Crusade, in particular the capture of Jerusalem, the goals laid out by Urban II had been met. However, the rapid demobilization of the crusading forces left the Crusader states in a precarious position. Surrounded by hostile Muslim countries, the hard fought gains of the late eleventh century could be soon lost. The primary objective of the Crusade of 1101 was then to reinforce and defend these newly established states, in particular the kingdom, from attacks from Muslim forces. The crusade also gave many Europeans who had failed to participate in the First Crusade—or who had abandoned it before its successful conclusion—a chance to fulfill their religious vows and earn spiritual rewards. A secondary goal was to recover Bohemond who remained in captivity.

=== Gathering of the armies ===
Crusade of 1101

The new pope Pascal II surely heard of the precarious situation in the Holy Land and Daimbert had provided him with written status reports. As a result, the pope replied to Daimbert's plea by appointing Maurice of Porto as papal legate in March 1101. He preached the new crusade widely and the response was overwhelming. The news of the liberation of Jerusalem and the First Crusade's leaders rose to mythic proportions.

The expedition was not a single unified army but a series of separate armies led by prominent European nobles. Among the most important leaders were: Stephen of Blois, who had abandoned the First Crusade before the capture of Antioch and sought to restore his honor; Raymond of Saint-Gilles, who had become a sycophant of the Byzantine emperor; William II of Nevers; Welf IV of Bavaria; and William IX of Aquitaine. Their goal was to reinforce the kingdom and assist the Christian settlements in the Levant and the armies met in Nicomedia in May 1101.

=== Battles of Mersivan and Heraclea ===
The armies traveled separately through the Byzantine Empire and into Anatolia, where they encountered determined resistance from the sultanate of Rum under Kilij Arslan. Having learned from his earlier defeats, Kilij Arslan united with other Muslim rulers, including the Danishmends, to stop the new invasion. The first major engagement was the Battle of Mersivan in August 1101, where the army led by Raymond of Saint-Gilles, Stephen of Blois, and other nobles was surrounded and destroyed after several days of fighting. Thousands of crusaders were killed or captured, while only a small number escaped. This decisive victory demonstrated the effectiveness of Seljuk tactics, including ambushes, mobility, and cutting off supply chains.

Other crusading forces met similar disasters. The army led by William II of Nevers was defeated near Heraclea after becoming exhausted from hunger and thirst while crossing Anatolia. Soon afterward, the armies of Welf IV of Bavaria and William IX of Aquitaine were also overwhelmed at the Battle of Heraclea in September 1101.

=== Defeat of the Western forces ===
These defeats were caused by poor coordination among the crusading forces, unfamiliarity with the harsh terrain, inadequate supplies, and the highly mobile cavalry tactics of the Turks. Instead of combining their strength, the crusader armies advanced separately, allowing Kilij Arslan to destroy them one at a time.

Although a small number of survivors eventually reached the Holy Land and reinforced the Crusader states, the Crusade of 1101 was overwhelmingly considered a failure. The heavy losses weakened European military strength and confirmed that the victories of the First Crusade could not easily be repeated. At the same time, the success of Kilij Arslan restored Seljuk confidence and secured Turkish control over much of Anatolia.

== Consolidation of Palestine ==
Baldwin I started the new year of 1101 ruling a kingdom that had little military might, just a few hundred knights. In addition, the Latin patriarch Daimbert had conspired to deny him the throne and would soon be replaced by the papal legate Maurice of Porto. Daimbert's co-cospirator Tancred, the most powerful lord in the kingdom, did not recognize Baldwin as king and relucantly took over at Antioch as his cousin Bohemond lay in a Turkish prison.

=== Capture of the coastal cities of Arsuf and Caesarea ===
Among his first actions was to secure the defense of the kingdom and made arrangements with the commanders of a Genoese fleet for their support. He had hoped that the forces of the Crusade of 1101 would help, but few made it to the Holy Land. In Palestine, he then looked to the territories of Arsuf and Caesarea to expand his domain.

The city of Arsuf had resisted Godfrey of Bouillon's assault in 1099, and he accepted their tribute in lieu of conquest. Not satisified with that arrangement, the second Siege of Arsuf launched by Baldwin lasted but three days, with the city captured on 19 April 1101. The Franks allowed the citizens safe passage to Ascalon with their belongings. Baldwin's forces suffered no deaths in this endeavor.

The Siege of Caesarea began on 2 May 1101, with a combined force of Franks and Genoese taking first the outer town and bringing siege engines to engage the fortified city. The Fatimid garrison resisted the attack for two weeks when the Genoan Guglielmo Embriaco breached the walls with the help of a Muslim collaborator. On 17 May 1101, the army entered the city and engaged in a massacre of the residents and significant looting.

=== Fatimid counterattacks at Ramla ===
While the Franks were expanding along the Mediterranean coast, al-Afdal Shahanshah was planning an offensive at the Palestinian town of Ramla, midway between Ascalon and Jerusalem. The Egyptian and Frankish armies clashed at the first Battle of Ramla on 7 September 1101. The Egyptians, led by Sa'd al-Dawla al-Qawwasi, had a five-to-one advantage over the Franks, led by Baldwin I. The fighting was fierce and in the end, Baldwin prevailed and the surviving Fatimids retreated to Ascalon.

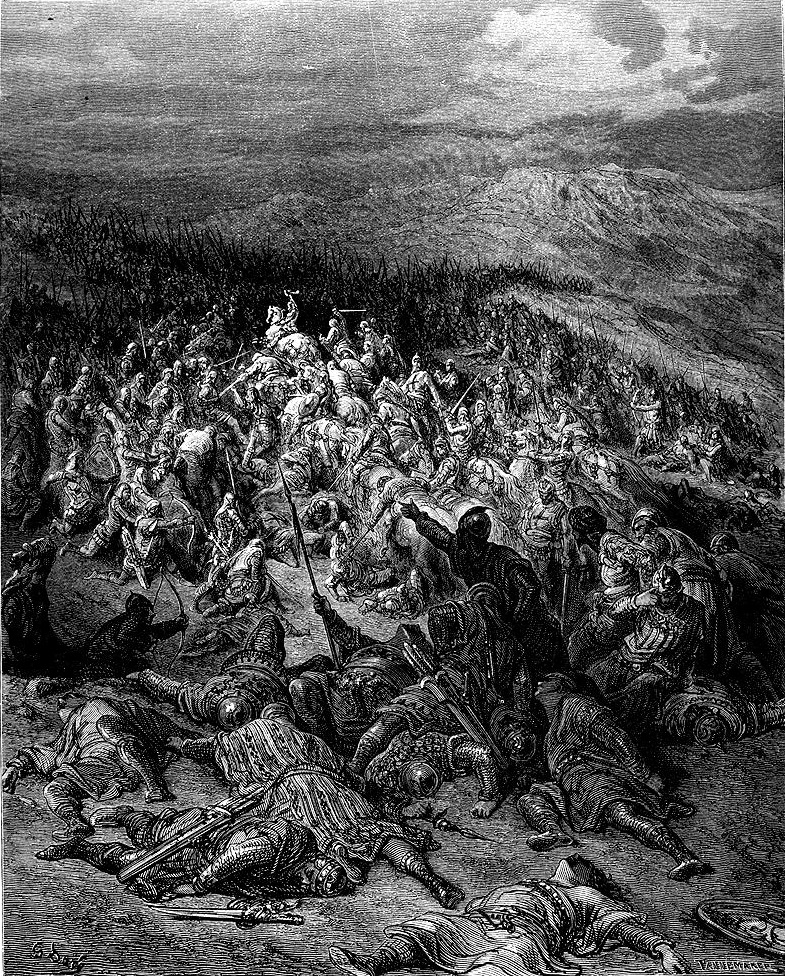
Two Hundred Knights Attack Twenty Thousand Saracens. Illustration by Gustave Doré (1877).

The Egyptians struck again the next year with a comparable force led by al-Afdal's son Sama' al-Mulk Husayn. Baldwin was at Jaffa seeing off the survivors of the Crusade of 1101 when he heard of the Fatimid movements and led a small Frankish force of two hundred knights to met them, thinking they were just a scouting party. On 17 May 1102, the Franks encountered the large Egyptian force at the second Battle of Ramla. A melee ensured, with most of the Franks killed and Baldwin barely escaping. He arrived at Arsuf two days later.

At the same time, reinforcements under Hugh of Fauquembergues, now prince of Galilee, arrived at Arsuf. Hugh placed the king on an English ship to sail to Jaffa while he marched south. At Jaffa, Baldwin found a city under duress by the attacking Fatimids. A fleet of 200 English ships soon followed allowing the Franks breathing room. The subsequent Battle of Jaffa commenced on 27 May 1102 and the Egyptians were routed. The kingdom would survive to fight another day.

Another attempt by al-Afdal to take Palestine was made three years later when the Egyptians were supported by Toghtekin, emir of Damascus. At the third Battle of Ramla, on 27 August 1105, Baldwin again defeated his Muslim foes but was unable to pursue them beyond the battlefield. This was the Egyptian vizier's last large scale attack on Palestine although minor skirmishes continued.

=== Tripoli, the fourth Crusader state ===
After the Crusade of 1101, Raymond of Saint-Gilles returned to Constantinople and continued his support to the emperor. In 1102, he travelled to Antioch and was imprisoned by Tancred, later released with the promise of no military action in the region. He immediately broke the promise and conquered Tartus where from which he planned to attack the fortified city of Tripoli. Upon learning of Raymond's plans, the qadi of Tripoli Fakhr al-Mulk requested help from the emirs of Damascus and Homs. (Note: Fakhr al-Mulk was part of the Banu Ammar tribe that had friendly relations with both the Fatimids and Seljuks.) The combined forces of Duqaq, Janah ad-Dawla and the local Banu Ammar outnumbered Raymond's forces by a factor of twenty. Yet, the Frankish force defeated the Muslims allowing Raymond to dominate the region.

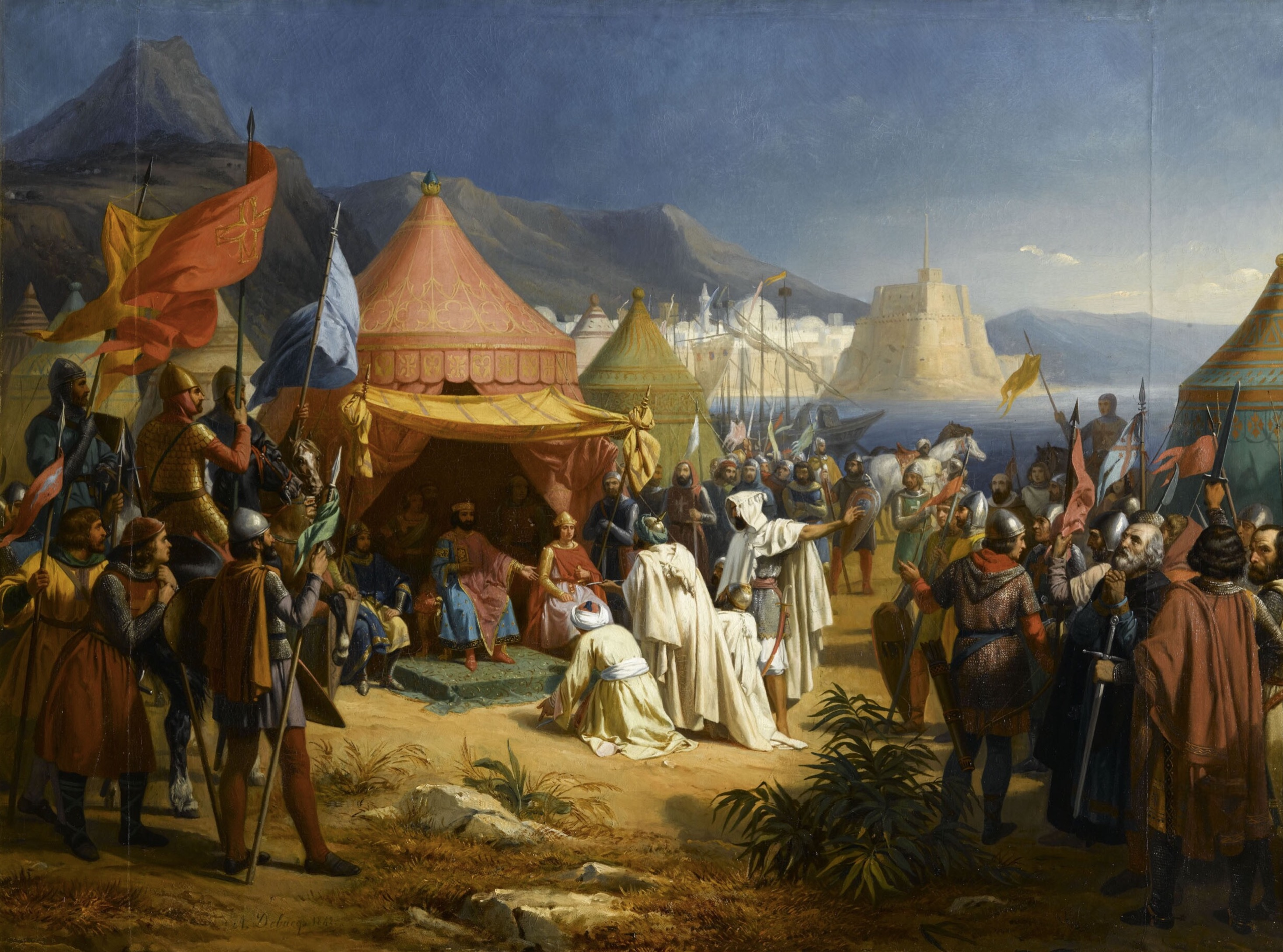
Tripoli submitting to Bertrand of Toulouse. Painting by Charles-Alexandre Debacq, 1842

Not having sufficient forces to mount a siege of Tripoli, Raymond set about expanding his area of operations. He besieged the mighty fortress known then as Qal'at al-Hisn, owned by Janah ad-Dawla. (Note: The Qal'at al-Hisn was the forerunner of the great fortress Krak des Chevaliers.) As the emir rushed to mobilize a relief army, he was murdered by three Assassins, presumably on the orders of Ridwan. Duqaq quickly to over the fort and the Franks moved on.

Raymond then called on a Genoese fleet under admiral Hugh Embriaco, then moored at Latakia. Failing in their attack on Tripoli, they captured the port of Gibelet. At the end of 1103, he then began the building of the castle known as Pilgrim's Mountain (Mons Peregrinus) from which he would mount his Siege of Tripoli. It was completed in spring 1104, causing the Muslim garrison at Tripoli to attack the castle that September. Raymond was severely burned, dying on 28 February 1105.

Raymond's soldiers selected his nephew William II Jordan as the new commander, who kept the siege going. The city was being starved given the near-complete blockade by land and sea. Fakhr al-Mulk could not turn to Duqaq as he had died in June 1104 and he was on bad terms with his successor Toghtekin. He then turned to Mardin, where the Artuqid emir Sökmen brought a large relief army towards Tripoli. In October 1104, the emir also died, and his generals returned home to quarrel over his successor.

After years of holding out under siege, Fakhr al-Mulk set out in spring 1108 to beg for help from Baghdad, particularly the caliph al-Mustazhir and sultan Muhammad I Tapar. They were sympathetic but no relieving army would be forthcoming. In his absence, the Tripolian nobles called on the Fatimids to save the city and they appointed Sharaf ad-Daulah as governor, arriving at Tripoli in the summer of 1108. Fakhr was in Damascus when he heard this news and he returned to Jabala which he still controlled.

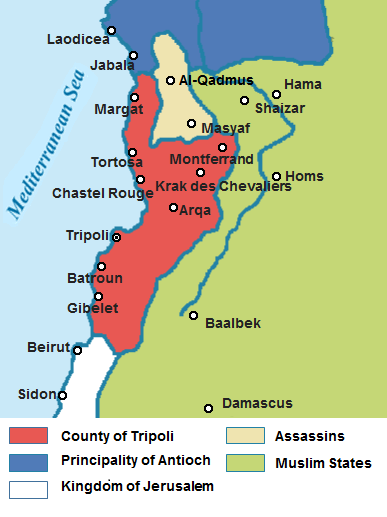

In May 1109, Tancred approached Jabala and Fakhr surrendered it to him, fleeing to Damascus. Raymond's son Bertrand of Toulouse arrived shortly thereafter with a large force to claim his inheritance. By June, all the great leaders of Outremer gathered with their armies outside of Tripoli. Joining Bertrand were Baldwin I, Baldwin of Bourcq, Tancred, and the representatives of the various Italian cities. Sharaf offered Baldwin I terms of surrender which included safe passage for the citizens.

On 12 July 1109, the Christians entered Tripoli, ending the longest siege mounted by the Franks. Baldwin kept his word and most of the Muslim residents departed peacefully. However, a squadron of Genoese marines entered the undefended city and sacked, burned and murdered rampantly. The great library of the Banu Ammar was burned, with thousands of books lost. The County of Tripoli was shortly formed with Bertrand as its first count.

=== Success at Acre and Beirut ===
In defeating the Fatimids at Jaffa in May 1102, Baldwin I made a major stride in consolidating his hold on Palestine. However, continued Egyptian control of the key cities of Acre and Tyre limited his seaborne supply chains and even his ability to travel safely from Jerusalem to Jaffa.

Towards that end, he initiated the first Siege of Acre on 6 April 1103 with a force of five thousand men accompanied by siege engines. The siege was successful and the garrison at Acre was ready to surrender when a fleet of twelve Fatimid galleys and a large transport from Sidon and Tyre arrived to relieve the city. Baldwin called off the siege on 16 May 1103 and returned to Jerusalem.

On 6 May 1104, Baldwin began his second Siege of Acre, supported by a seventy-ship Genoese fleet coming from Haifa. This time, there would be no Fatimid support and the governor of the city sought similar terms that were granted at Arsuf. Baldwin accepted these terms and Muslim residents were allow to depart after paying a small tax. On 25 May 1104, Acre became a possession of the Franks and soon became their major trading port.

After the conquest of Tripoli, there was still work to be done in Palestine and Baldwin set his sights on Beirut. In early February 1110, the Siege of Beirut began with the king supported by Bernard of Toulouse. A naval blockade was enforced by ships from Pisa and Genoa, with ground forces from Jerusalem and Tripoli. Fatimid attempts to pierce the naval blockade were in vain. After two months, the Fatimid governor fled to Cyprus, surrendering to the Byzantines, and on 13 May 1110, Beirut was taken by assult by the land forces. The Italians began looting the city and massacring its residents before Baldwin could intervene.

Acre would remain in the royal domain while the Lordship of Beirut was granted to Fulk of Guînes.

=== Sidon and the Norwegian Crusade ===
In the midst of the siege of Tripoli, Baldwin I set his sights on the Fatimid coastal city of Sidon. His first attempt to conquer the city was in August 1108. His Italian naval support was quickly routed by the Egyptian fleet and the Muslim garrison was relieved by Seljuk troops sent by Toghtekin. (Note: The governor of Sidon offered Toghtekin a payment of 30,000 bezants to come to his aid. When the Seljuks arrived and routed the Franks, the governor refused them admitance thinking they might have designs on the city. The Seljuks threatened to bring Baldwin back and join forces with him, and the Sidonites releted and paid their tribute.) Baldwin wisely raised the siege.

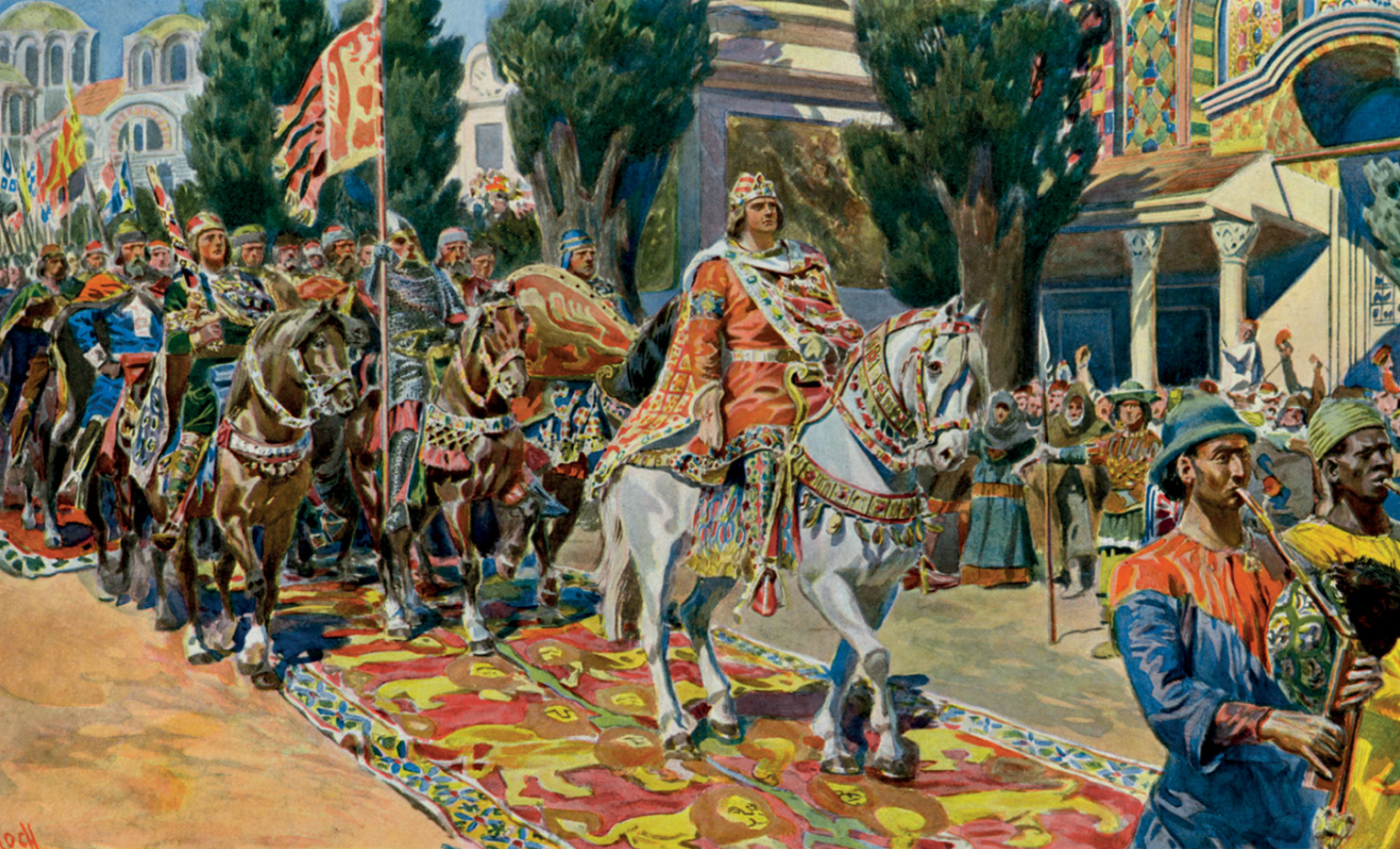
Sigurd the Crusader entering Constantinople, by Andreas Bloch.

At the same time, king Sigurd I of Norway was leading a flotilla of sixty ships towards the Levant in what is known as the Norwegian Crusade. Arriving at Acre in the summer of 1110, Sigurd agreed to help Baldwin in his upcoming Siege of Sidon. The Franks began their siege on 19 October with the harbor protected by the Norwegians.

The defense of the city was strong and Sigurd's fleet was overtaken by a large Fatimid naval force from Tyre. The Norwegians were saved by the arrival of an Italian squadron led by Ordelafo Faliero, the doge of Venice. The city capitulated on 5 December 1110 and the residents granted the same safe passage terms as in Arsuf and Tripoli. Eustace Grenier would become lord of Sidon.

=== Failure at Ascalon and Tyre ===
Baldwin I now controlled the entire Palestinian coast except for Ascalon and Tyre, and he set his sights on both after the capture of Sidon. Shams al-Khilafa, the governor of Ascalon, called for an armistice with the Franks, offering an annual tribute. Upon learning of this, al-Afdal Shahanshah sent troops to depose him. He refused entry to the Fatimids and expelled those with Fatimid leanings from the city, relying on Armenian mercenaries for protection.

On July 1111, Shams traveled to Jerusalem and put Ascalon under the protection of Baldwin. In response, the king sent three hundred soldiers that were installed in the citadel. Regarding this as treason, the citizens staged a coup d'état, murdering Shams and the Franks. Baldwin rushed to save his troops but was too late. After receiving Shams' head, al-Afdal reinstated Fatimid rule over Ascalon where it would remain for another forty years.

To the north, Baldwin began the Siege of Tyre on 29 November 1111. It was a concerted effort with siege engines but no naval support. The emir of Tyre had recently switched allegiances from Cairo to Damascus, and Toghtekin had provided a garrison to reinforce the city's defenses and installed a governor. On 10 April 1112, Baldwin lifted the siege. He was content to isolate Tyre with fortresses at Toron and near Scandelion. Tyre would remain in Muslim hands until 1124.

== Latin Syria in crisis ==
In the decade following the founding of the kingdom, all the major coastal cities of Palestine except Ascalon and Tyre had been conquered. The inland towns and cities generally made arrangements with the Franks to avoid further conflict. The Fatimid threat was diminished but still close by. The graver concern came from the Seljuks, particularly to the Crusader states of Antioch and Edessa.

=== Bohemond's adventures with Byzantium ===
In May 1103, Bohemond was ransomed largely from treasure provided by the Armenian Kogh Vasil and returned to his leadership position in Antioch that August. Suffering defeats at the hands of the Seljuks, (Note: See Section 6.3 below.) he traveled to Europe in search of reinforcements in September 1104. Regarding the emperor Alexios as his enemy, he recruited a large army that would fight against Constantinople. Attacking Byzantium in November 1107 at the Siege of Dyrrhachium, this army was defeated by September 1108. The subsequent Treaty of Devol signed by Bohemond and Alexios that year would have made the Principality of Antioch a vassal state of the Byzantine Empire. (Note: Tancred refused to abide by the Treaty of Devol.)

=== Emirs and sultans of Syria and Iraq ===
The rulers of the major cites in Syria and Iraq would fight the Franks in the north, including Antioch and Edessa, with great intensity, introducing jihad against the Western Christians. Having won the civil war with his half-brother Berkyaruq, Muhammad I Tapar became the Seljuk sultan in 1105, serving until his death in 1118. He was succeeded by his son Mahmud II in Iraq and Persia and brother Ahmad Sanjar elsewhere.

Ridwan was the emir of Aleppo from 1094 until his death in 1113. He was succeeded by his son Alp Arslan al-Akhras who's powerful atabeg Lu'lu' al-Yaya controlled the city. The last Seljuk emir of Aleppo was Sultan Shah, the brother of Alp. The Artuqid Ilghazi assumed power in 1118 and, after his death in 1122, his distant cousin Belek Ghazi took control. Two years later, he was succeeded by Timurtash, the last of the Artuqids. In 1125, Aleppo would become part of Mahmud's sultanate.

Duqaq, the brother of Ridwan, was the emir of Damascus from 1094 until his death in 1104. The city was then ruled first by Toghtekin and, after his death in 1128, by his son Buri, founders of the Burid dynasty.

Mosul was ruled by powerful atabegs reporting to the Seljuk sultans, beginning with Kerbogha in 1096. Following his death in 1102, Jikirmish assumed power and briefly rebelled against the sultan Muhammad I who brought him in line after the Siege of Mosul. On 1106, he was murdered by the Turkish adventurer Jawali Saqawa who replaced him after the War of Mosul. Muhammad I in turn replaced Jawali in 1109 with Mawdud who would ravage the Franks. In October 1113, Mawdud was slain by an Assassin and was replaced by Aqsunqur al-Bursuqi. In November 1126, he too was felled by Assassins.

=== Disaster at Harran and the captivity of Baldwin II ===
After Bohemond was freed in May 1103, he teamed with Baldwin II in a number of campaigns to secure the territory between Antioch and Edessa, with an eye towards taking Aleppo. This area was defended by a large army under the Seljuk emir of Mosul, Jikirmish, and the Artuqid emir of Mardin, Sökmen.

The first of these campaigns was at Harran, a city in Upper Mesopotamia under the control of Mosul. The Battle of Harran began on 7 May 1104 with the Franks' attacking the Muslim forces in a plain near the city. Bohemond was joined by Tancred commanding Antioch's troops on the right flank and Baldwin with Joscelin of Courtenay leading the forces from Edessa on the left flank.

The Edessan troops became detached from the main force and foolishly charged the Muslim army. A fierce counterattack ensued and the Edessan's were routed. Baldwin II and Joscelin were taken captive, and Bohemond and Tancred retreated to Edessa, where the latter was charged with the city's defense.

The loss at Harran was devastating to the Franks, showing the Muslims, Greeks and Armenians that the Latin's presence in the Levant was weaker than was previously thought. The Byzantines reoccupied Cilicia and Latakia, and towns in the Antioch region, including the strategically important city of Artah, expelled their Latin garrisons. It was at this point that Bohemond left for Europe, recalling Tancred from Edessa to rule Antioch. Tancred's cousin Richard of Salerno was appointed count of Edessa in Baldwin's absence.

Rising from a low point, Tancred sought to regain the initiative and attacked the Aleppans under Ridwan at the Battle of Artah on 20 April 1105. The Franks routed the Muslim forces, given him a sorely need victory. This legitimized Tancred's position as prince and allowed him to regain control over what was lost the previous year.

Following Harran, Baldwin II and Joscelin were held by Sökmen, but the more valuable Baldwin was spirited away by Jikirmish and taken to Mosul. Passing to Ilghazi, Joscelin was ransomed by the citizens of Turbessel in 1107.

Tancred had taken prisoner a Seljuk princess who was prized by Jikirmish, and the emir offered to ransom her through either a large ransom or in exchange for Baldwin. Despite urgings from the king, Tancred took the money and left Baldwin in captivity.

When Jawali Saqawa captured Mosul, he began negotiations with Joscelin over Baldwin's ransom, badly needing funds to counter the coming attack of the city by Mawdud. When the attack came, Jawali fled with his prisoner to the castle of Qal'at Ja'bar. Joscelin could raise only part of the ransom and offered it as partial payment, with Joscelin taking Baldwin's place in captivity. Jawali accepted and released the count in the summer of 1108. Joscelin's freedom came shortly thereafter.

=== Antioch against Edessa at Turbessel ===
Tancred had been count of Edessa for four years when Baldwin II was released, with his cousin Richard of Salerno governing in his name. He had no interest in returning the county and demanded that Baldwin swear allegiance to him. Baldwin was a vassal to the kingdom and could not do what Tancred wanted. He and Joscelin of Courtenay retreated to Turbessel where he contacted Jawali Saqawa and the Armenian Kogh Vasil, both of which agreed to help counter Tancred. It was only the intervention of Bernard of Valence, the Latin patriarch of Antioch, that prevented outright conflict between the two.

The expansion of the county of Edessa prior to 1131.

As part of his agreement with Jawali, Baldwin had agreed to free his Muslim captives and rebuild the mosques in the town of Saruj near Edessa. This arrangement alarmed Ridwan as Jawali had aggressively threatened his lands on the Euphrates. Ridwan countered by raiding a caravan from Turbessel that included some of the ransom money raised by Joscelin.

In September 1108, Jawali captured the town of Balis, just fifty miles from Aleppo, and crucified Ridwan's agent there. Ridwan turned to Tancred for help to eject Jawali, and an combined Christian–Muslim army formed in an alliance of Antioch and Aleppo. Jawali turned to Baldwin for support as well as the Bedouins of the Banu Maryad under the emir Sadaqa.

In October 1108, the two armies met at the city of Manbij to fight the Battle of Turbessel. The armies were evenly matched and Jawali was fighting to the advantage when his Bedouin troops deserted the battlefield, stealing Baldwin's reserve horses. The tide turned and the Antioch–Aleppo coalition was victorious.

Tancred and Baldwin II reconcilled at the insistence of the king as a unified front was required to meet the rising threat of the new atabeg of Mosul, Mawdud. The reconcilliation was formalized at the Council of Tripoli in late 1109.

=== Campaigns of Mawdud in Syria and Palestine ===
Mawdud was a officer in services of Muhammad I Tapar who was sent to wrest control of Mosul from the rebel Jawali Saqawa in 1109. In early 1110, the sultan directed Mawdud to begin offensive actions to reclaim Syria from the Franks. His first target was Edessa and he organized an Abbasid army that included Ilghazi and Sökmen el-Kutbî of the Shah-Armens.

Mawdud's first Campaign to Syria began in April 1110, arriving at the city of Edessa on 12 May. Upon hearing of the impending attack, Baldwin II sent Joscelin of Courtenay to Jerusalem to get help from the king. Baldwin I was invested in the siege of Beirut and could not disengage until the city was captured. Once accomplished, he sped north and, joining with troops of Kogh Vasil, arriving at Edessa in late June. Mawdud, having besieged the city for two months without penetrating the fortress walls, withdrew to Harran when the royal forces arrived.

Tancred had initially refused to support Baldwin II, but relucantly came at the insistence of the king who then arbitrated the dispute between Antioch and Edessa. He left shortly thereafter, as did most of the Frankish troops, garrisoning only the fortresses of Edessa and Saruj. Mawdud, now joined by Toghtekin, ravaged the Edessan countryside east of the Euphrates, which would never fully recover. The Franks' weaknesses had been exposed.

Mawdud's second Campaign to Syria began in April 1111 with a coalition that included Sökmen el-Kutbî, Toghtekin, Bursuq ibn Bursuq and many others. The call for the campaign was driven in part by the sultan's view that Ridwan had become concillitory with Tancred, threatening a unified Muslim response.

In July 1111, Mawdud invaded Edessa and, finding the city too well-defended, abandoned his siege and turned south. The Siege of Turbessel began on 28 July and lasted for forty-five days before it was abandoned so that the Abbasid army could come to the aid of Aleppo. Ridwan, in his deceipt, claimed that he was under attack by Tancred and when Mawdud arrived at the gates of Aleppo, they were closed to him.

Mawdud moved south to Shaizar where Sultan ibn Munqidh of the Arab tribe Banu Munqidh welcomed his support against the Franks. In September 1111, Tancred called for support from Jerusalem, Tripoli and Edessa, and the combined armies assembled in a defensive position at Apamea. The Battle of Shaizar began in mid-September and after two weeks of fighting, on 29 September, Mawdud retreated, releasing his forces.

In May 1113, Mawdud led a third Abbasid army out of Mosul, this time to invade Palestine. Soon he was joined by Toghtekin who had grown weary of the Franks continual encroachment on Damascene lands. Learning of this threat, Baldwin I brought his royal army out to meet the invading force at the Battle of al-Sannabra on 28 June. The Franks were soundly routed by Mawdud's forces, with Baldwin narrowly escaping, retreating to Mount Tabor above Tiberias.

Baldwin II was joined by Roger of Salerno from Antioch and Pons of Tripoli, and the Frankish forces held their defensive position for four weeks. In the meanwhile, the Muslim army ravaged the countryside of Jaffa and Jerusalem. Their commanders were unable to storm the Franks' position and, with their troops worn from battle, they disbanded their armies and returned home.

Mawdud then traveled to Damascus to confer with Toghtekin. On 2 October 1113, he was murdered by a lone assailant, thought to be an Assassin. Toghtekin was believed to be complicit in the murder, but no firm connection was ever established. He became suspect in the court of the sultan, and as a result, formed an alliance with the Frankish princes in 1115. Mawdud was succeeded in Mosul by al-Bursuqi.

=== Victory at Tell Danith ===
Ridwan had died in December 1113 leaving his young son Alp Arslan as emir of Aleppo, controlled by the atabeg Lu'lu' al-Yaya. The next year, Alp Arslan was murdered and his brother the six-year-old Sultan Shah became emir. Aleppo was in chaos, threatened by Ilghazi and Toghtekin, and Lu'lu' requested help from Baghdad. In 1115, the sultan responded by sending a task force under the command of Bursuq ibn Bursuq whose mission was to reassert Abbasid control over Syria. Ilghazi and Toghtekin, now in control of Aleppo, sought help from Antioch with an alliance with Roger of Salerno.

Roger viewed an alliance with the two emirs with skepticism but was convinced by one of his vassals Robert fitz-Fulk the Leper, who had a close friendship with Toghtekin, to proceed. A treaty of military cooperation was concluded, and a pan-Levantine force was formed to counter Bursuq.

In summer 1115, Bursuq approached Aleppo and, finding it closed to him, moved to Shaizar and prepared to attack the southern flank of Antioch. Roger assembled his forces with Toghtekin, which were supplemented by those from Baldwin I and Pons of Tripoli in August. In light of this counterforce, Bursuq retreated back to Shaizar. Roger returned to Antioch, his coalition dispersing.

Bursuq's retreat had been a ruse and he swept back, taking the castle at Kafartab. Hearing this, Roger left Antioch on 12 September, summoning Baldwin II from Edessa for help. He did not have time to wait for the king, Pons or the Damascenes. The two armies finally met on 14 September 1115 at the Battle of Tell Danith when Roger went on the offensive. Despite the odds, the Franks routed the Abbasid army, with Bursuq barely escaping alive. The strategic victory of the Franks put an end to Baghdad's attempts to expel them from Syria.

=== Last days of Baldwin I of Jerusalem ===
Freed from the Abbasid threat and with Damascus and Aleppo neutralized, Baldwin I set about to deal with the Egyptians who remained a thorn in Jerusalem's southern side. He constructed the castle at Montreal in fall 1115, helping secure the caravan routes between Egypt and Syria. Returning to the region the next year, he expanded the kingdom's reach to Aqaba on the Red Sea. Not forgetting Tyre, he began construction of Scandelion Castle to complete the blockade of the city. While on an exploratory mission to Egypt, Baldwin I of Jerusalem died on 2 April 1118. He was buried five days later in a tomb next to that of Godfrey of Bouillon.

== Baldwin II of Jerusalem ==
Baldwin II was enroute to Jerusalem to celebrate Easter when he learned of the death of the king. Baldwin I's will specified that his successor should be his brother Eustace III of Boulogne, but the nobles of Jerusalem prevailed and Baldwin II of Jerusalem was consecrated king on 14 April 1118, Easter Day.

=== The kingdom in 1118 ===
A map of the territorial extent of the Crusader states, Edessa, Antioch, Tripoli, and Jerusalem, in the Holy Land in 1135. The nearest Christian states were the Kingdom of Cilicia and the Byzantine empire.

By 1118, the Frankish states enjoyed their highest level of security since their inception. The kingdom peacefully transitioned from one strong ruler to the next. Arnulf of Chocques, having endured the Latin patriarchy of Daimbert, Evremar and Ghibbelin of Arles, was again appointed patriarch, although he would die that year and be succeeded by Warmund of Picquigny.

The Crusader states were stable and working in a unified manner to counter the Levantine Muslims. In Antioch, Tancred had died in 1112, and Bohemond II became prince under the regency of Roger of Salerno. Joscelin of Courtenay became count of Edessa, as Joscelin I of Edessa, when Baldwin II was elevated to king. Pons of Tripoli had been count since the death of Bertrand of Toulouse in 1112. These principals had supported each other and the king in numerous battles.

The Muslim states surrounding the kingdom were generally calm after Tell Danith. The Fatimids of Egypt were spent as an invasion force, although still controlling the coastal cities of Ascalon and Tyre. Their last gasp at the Battle of Yibneh in May 1123 was thwarted by Eustace Grenier. Damascus was under a truce with the Franks, Baghdad had retreated after the defeats of Mawdud and Bursuq, and the Seljuks of Rum had focused on the Byzantines since the Crusade of 1101. Only Aleppo under Ilghazi remained a major threat.

Byzantine emperor Alexios I Komnenos died just four months after Baldwin I. He had quelled the sultanate of Rum at the Battle of Philomelion in the fall of 1116, but still coveted Antioch. The Treaty of Devol had placed the principality under his suzerainty, but Tancred had refused to comply. It would fall to his successor John II Komnenos to handle the situation.

Pascal II would also die in 1118. His successor was short-lived but in 1119, Callixtus II would assume the papacy. He would strongly support the Crusading mission.

=== Ilghazi at the Field of Blood and Tell Danith ===
Ever since the Frankish victory at Tell Danith in 1115, the position of Aleppo was particularly precarious. When in 1117, the city came under the rule of Ilghazi, the new emir was boxed in one three sides by recent conquests of the Latins. He could only count on Damascus who had again gone on the offensive against Jerusalem.

In the spring of 1119, Ilghazi decided to attack Antioch. His now ally Toghtekin agreed to help as did the Banu Munqidh of Shaizar. His plea for support from Baghdad, now under Mahmud II, went unanswered. By then end of May, his army numbering in the tens of thousands was on the march. He encamped at Qinnasrin to await the arrival of Toghtekin.

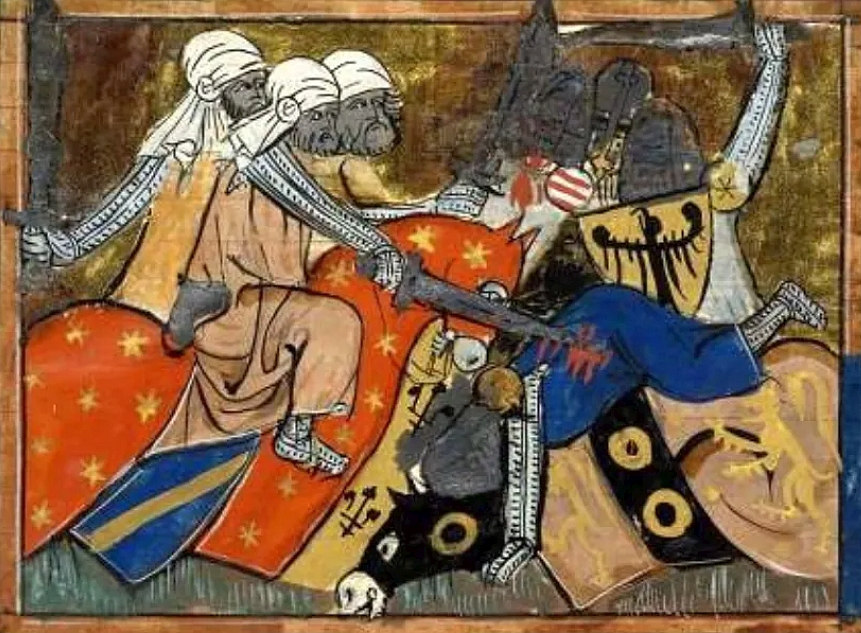
Battle of Ager-Sanguinis, 1337 miniature

Roger of Salerno watched Aleppo's troop movements and prepared to respond. Baldwin II and Pons of Tripoli agreed to send men to help. Impatient, on 20 June 1119, Roger moved his entire army of Antioch into position at Tel-Aqibrin, at the eastern edge of the plain of Sarmada. He hoped to wait there until the forces of Jerusalem and Tripoli would arrive.

Ilghazi attacked the Frankish castle at al-Atharib on 27 June 1119 and Roger responded by sending a relief force. The emir feinted a retreat, but turned towards the main body of the Antiochenes and waited throughout the night.

The Aleppean troops were encouraged to wage jihad against the Franks by the qadi ibn al-Khashshab. Al-Khashshad had guided Aleppo after the death of Ridwan and helped rid the city of Assassins.

The next morning, on 28 June 1119, Roger was told by his scouts that the camp was surrounded by Muslim forces and the Battle of Ager Sanguinis, the Field of Blood, began. The result was a massacre, with the Frankish forces decimated by midday. Most of Roger's army was killed or captured.

Roger of Salerno was killed in the battle, but his constable Rainald I Masoir and a few knights escaped the slaughter, taking refuge at Sarmada. Ilghazi soon approached the fortress and Rainald surrendered to him, and his life was spared. Others were not so lucky and the survivors of Roger's army were taken to Aleppo where they were tortured to death in the streets.

The city of Antioch expected that Ilghazi would attack them next, but he returned a hero to Aleppo. His troops spread mayhem throughout the county and soon followed suit. Baldwin II and his army arrived at Antioch in early August 1119 and assumed the regency of Bohemond II, a boy of ten living in Italy with his mother. Pons of Tripoli arrived shortly thereafter.

The forces of Toghtekin arrived then at Aleppo and the combined army and, on 11 August 1119, marched out to capture the Frankish fortresses in the region, beginning with al-Atharib. They then went to Zerdana, where the garrison surrendered in exchange for their lives. Nevertheless, they were massacred when they emerged from the gates.

On 14 August 1119, the Christian and Muslim armies met at the Battle of Hab, also known as the second Battle of Tell Danith. The battle itself was confused and both sides claimed victory. The Franks did drive the forces of Ilghazi and Toghtekin from the battlefield, accompanied by many prisoners including Robert the Leper.

Baldwin II and Pons returned to their respective home bases as heroes, having saved Antioch from destruction. This marked the end of the Artuqid invasions for the time being, having accomplished nothing.

After Hab, Ilghazi turned his sights north, towards the Kingdom of Georgia. The Georgian–Seljuk wars had been waged for decades, and Ilghazi's coalition army was soundly defeated by king David IV's forces at the Battle of Didgori in August 1121. Ilghazi was seriously wounded during the battle, but escaped, dying the next year.

=== Origins of the Military Orders ===
The emergence of two military orders that combined knighthood and religious vows had a profound effect of the campaigns of the twelfth century Levant. The Knights Hospitaller and Knights Templar would complement, and sometimes supplant, the secular armies of the Crusader states. They would frequently led the more important tactical roles in a battle, the vanguard and the rear-guard.

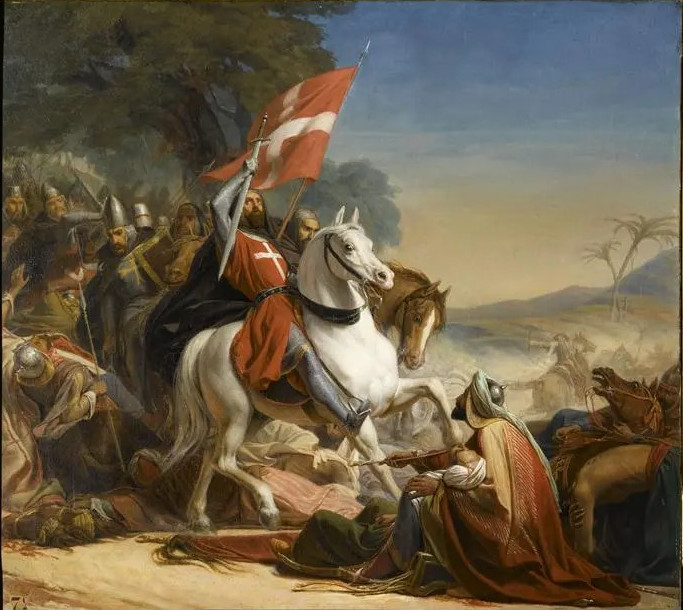
Défense de la Celesyrie par Raymond du Puy, by Édouard Cibot in the Salles des Croisades at Château de Versailles.

At the time of the Frankish capture of Jerusalem in 1099, the Hospitallers were run by Blessed Gérard, who had founded an Amalfian hospital in the city decades earlier. They were recognized as a formal organization by Pascal II in 1113 with his issuance of the bull Pie postulatio voluntatis, reiterated by Callixtus II in 1119. From 1120, the Hospitallers were led by French knight Raymond du Puy, who introduced the order's military mission. Their original focus was the protection of pilgrims which grew into defense of the kingdom by 1135 with their assumption of command of the castle at Bethgiblein, protecting the road from Ascalon to Hebron.

In 1119, French knight Hugues de Payens approached Baldwin II and patriarch Warmund about creating a religious order to protect pilgrims enroute to the Holy Land. The Templars were approved in January 1120 by the Council of Nablus and began as an impoverished order housed in a wing of the Al-Aqsa Mosque. With the help of Bernard of Clairvaux, the Templars became an approved charity and soon accumulated significant wealth ane power. Their military mission was officially approved in 1139 with the issuance of the bull Omne datum optimum.

The first known instance of the Templars in combat was at the Battle of Teqoa in 1138. There, a Fatimid marauding party from Ascalon was met by a Frankish force that included a Templar contingent led by Grand Master Robert de Craon. The Egyptians scored an overwhelming victory over the Franks and returned home.

=== Belek Ghazi and the captivity of Joscelin and Baldwin II ===
Baldwin II was now regent of Antioch and, with Joscelin I of Edessa, set about to stabilize the northern territories in the spring of 1120. Ilghazi and his nephew Belek Ghazi resumed their assaults on Frankish possessions, with near–continual skirmishes with Baldwin and Joscelin. Toghekin briefly joined the fight, believing that Baldwin's dual role in Jerusalem and Antioch prevented him from governing effectively.

The situation changed rapidly. Baldwin left to deal with a rebellious Pons of Tripoli, who had decided that he no longer had allegiance to the king. Toghekin also withdrew and Ilghazi fell ill, returning to Aleppo. Waleran of Le Puiset, lord of Birecik, alarmed at the presence of enemy forces, urged Joscelin to pursue Belek.

The two remaining commanders met on 13 September 1122 at the Battle of Saruj. There the Edessans were routed by Belek's forces and both Joscelin and Waleran were captured. The count was offered his freedom if he would surrender Edessa, but he refused and the prisoners were moved to Belek's castle at Kharpoot.

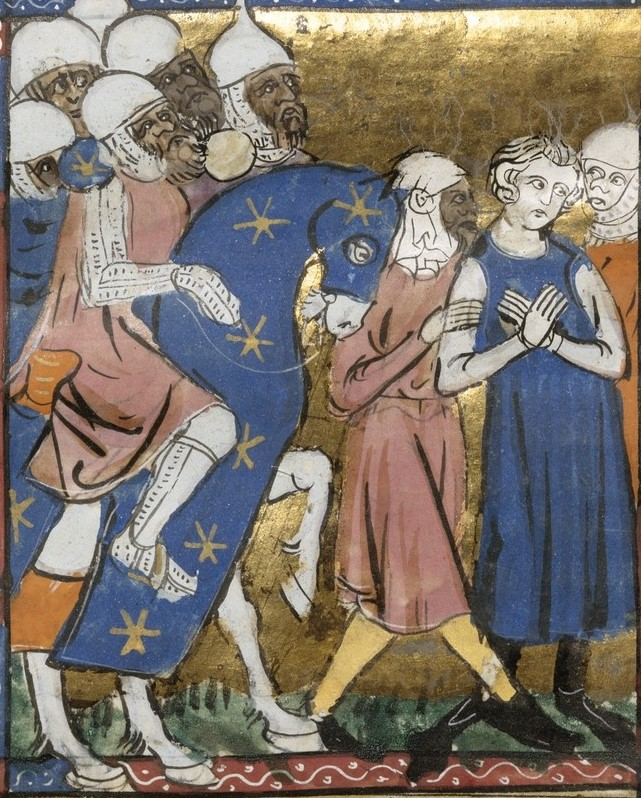
King Baldwin's capture, as portrayed in the 13th century

Ilghazi died shortly thereafter and left Belek as regent to his young sons Sulaiman and Timurtash. Baldwin assumed control of Edessa and placed the defense of the city in the hands of Geoffrey the Monk. He then went to confront Belek at the Battle of Gerger on 18 April 1123. The Turks lured Baldwin into an ambush, and he too was captured. Baldwin II, king of Jerusalem, then joined Joscelin in prison at Kharpoot.

The patriarch Warmund assembled the city nobles and barons together and elected first Eustace Grenier as regent of Jerusalem during the king's imprisonment. On 6 August 1123, Joscelin was rescued by a team of Armenians but Baldwin remained in captivity, transferred to the Citadel of Aleppo then next year. Joscelin assembled a multi–domain force to rescue the king but the quest was abandoned.

In the spring of 1123, the new Fatimid vizier al-Ma'mun launched an invasion of Frankish territories, assessing that the leadership crisis in the kingdom made it ripe for takeover. (Note: Al-Afdal Shahanshah was felled by an Assassin's blade on 11 December 1121.) On 29 May 1123, Eustace Grenier led an army to meet the Egyptians at the Battle of Yibneh. It was a decisive defeat for the Fatimids and essentially ended the Egyptian threat to the kingdom until the collapse of the caliphate forty years later. Eustace would not long survive his victory at Yibneh. He died on 15 June 1123 and was succeeded by William of Bures.

Joscelin continued to ravage to countryside around Aleppo, and was stopped at the Battle of Manbij on 5 May 1124 where Belek Ghazi was mortally wounded. The custody of Baldwin II then passed to Timurtash who quickly negotiated a large ransom of money and concessions. The ransom was partially paid, with Baldwin's daughter Joveta and Joscelin's son Joscelin II provided as hostages guaranteeing the remainder. Baldwin was released on 29 August 1124, with the children remaining in custody until summer 1125.

=== Tyre and the Venetian Crusade ===
After the Field of Blood, Baldwin II had beseeched Callixtus II to authorize a new crusade and, in 1122, the Venetian Crusade was launched. Led by doge Domenico Michiel, the crusade left Venice on 8 August with over 100 ships and 15,000 men. The flotilla first went to Corfu where they began a siege of Byzantine holdings there. Upon hearing of the capture of Baldwin by the Turks, they turned their attention to the Holy Land.

The Venetians arrived at Acre by the end of May and, learning of an Egyptian fleet at Ascalon, sailed southward and engaged them in battle. The Egyptians lost virtually all of their warships as well as merchant vessels that were captured. They now turned their attention to the Fatimid coastal cities of Ascalon and Tyre, and, together with the Franks, decided to attack Tyre first. A treaty of alliance between Jerusalem and Venice known as Pactum Warmundi was then signed in February 1124.

Since 1111, Tyre had been under the control of Damascus and, after the assassination of al-Afdal Shahanshah in 1121, the Fatimid caliph al-Amir wished to bring it back under his domain. Accordingly, he sent a fleet to Tyre and kidnapped the governor, reasserting control of the city. Toghtekin did not dispute this action but retained a supporting force.

The Siege of Tyre began on 15 February 1124. The Frankish forces were under the overall command of Warmund and were soon joined by Pons of Tripoli. The city was under a naval blockade by the Venetians and so there would be no resupply by sea. The major vulnerability of Tyre was that of water. The city was joined to the mainland by a narrow isthmus upon which an aqueduct sat that supplied the residents with fresh water. There were no wells in Tyre, but the cisterns were full after a robust rainy season, but the supply was finite.

Throughout the spring and summer months, Tyre was steadily bombarded by the Franks. The defenders put up a good fight, but needed reinforcements from Cairo and Damascus. The Egyptians initiated some attacks to the north, particularly at the fortress of La Mahomerie near Antioch, but they were easily repelled. Toghtekin's army waited at Banias, expecting the Egyptian fleet that would never come. The Franks set out an army to meet them, but the emir, seeing the futility of the fight, retired to Damascus.

By the end of June, the situation in Tyre reached the point of criticality, with food and water scarce. Toghtekin sought terms of surrender similar to other sieges, with safe passage and no looting. On 5 July 1124, the city gates were opened and the Franks and Venetians took control, with the Italians getting a one-third share.

=== Aleppo and Azaz ===
As a condition of his release, Baldwin II agreed to help Timurtash against the Bedouin warlord Dubays ibn Sadaqa of the Arab tribe Banu Mazyad. Instead, the king formed an alliance with Dubays to attack Aleppo. Sultan Shah, wishing to regain his emirate, joined the alliance which was soon augmented by armies from Antioch and Edessa.

The Siege of Aleppo began on 6 October 1124. Timurtash did not rise to defend the city and for three months the city resisted. Aleppo reached out to Mosul and Aqsunqur al-Bursuqi responded with a large force which arrived on 29 January 1125. Dubays wisely fled the battlefield and Baldwin raised the siege. The king returned to Jerusalem on 3 April after an absence of nearly three years. Aleppo was placed under the sultanate in Baghdad.

Al-Bursuqi then moved to consolidate his hold on northern Syria, with Toghtekin and the emir of Homs submitting to his hegemony. He then moved to Shaizar whose emir Sultan ibn Munqidh welcomed his new overlord. The emir also now held the Frankish hostages including the princess Jovetta, whom he turned over to al-Bursuqi.

By May 1125, al-Bursuqi turned his attention to Azaz. Baldwin II had promised to turn the fortress over to Timurtash but had reneged and now it was threatened by a large Muslim force. The king amassed a large army that included Antioch, Tripoli and Edessa and marched on the city.

On 11 June 1125 the armies met at the Battle of Azaz. Despite his large numerical superiority, al-Bursuqi's forces were soundly defeated by the Franks in a bloody confrontation. From the bountiful booty he received, Baldwin was able to pay the owed amount to release the hostages and they returned home with the king.

=== Buri and Damascus ===
Baldwin II continued his Syrian campaigns and, on 26 January 1126, defeated Toghtekin's army at the Battle of Marj al-Saffar. Toghtekin was accompanied by his son Buri who would rule Damascus following the former's death in February 1128. At this point, the forces from Mosul had dispersed with al-Bursuqi returning to his emirate only to be felled by a group of Assassins on 26 November 1126.

Buri lacked the sense of caution exhibited by his father. While countering a Frankish incursion near Damascus in 1119, Toghtekin sent Buri to deal with small force led by Joscelin. By foolishly engaging the Franks in a frontal attack, Buri's larger force was decimated putting the entire Damascene host at risk.

After Toghtekin's death, Baldwin II sent embassies to Western Europe to get recruits for a new crusade, known as the Damascus Crusade. Beginning in the spring of 1129, the main commanders of the force were Baldwin II, Joscelin I of Edessa, Pons of Tripoli, and Bohemond II of Antioch who had taken over the principality in 1126. The Christian forces were augmented by local Bedouins and Turkomans, with the total numbering some 2000 knights and 10,000 infantry.

Earlier, the Assassins had penetrated Damascus and were welcomed by Toghtekin, and briefly tolerated by Buri, granting their leader Bahram al-Da'i the fortified city of Banias. Bahram's ultimate goal was to conquer the city and, toward that end, he planned to turn the fortress over to the invading Franks. With this suspicion, Buri and his military governor Yusuf ibn Firuz turned on the Assassins on 4 September 1129 and slaughtered the whole lot of them.

Firmly in control of Banias, the Frankish army marched to within six miles of Damascus in early November. Baldwin sent a foraging party out under the command of William of Bures where they went far afield. There, twenty miles from the base camp, Buri's forces attacked and decimated the Franks. On 5 December 1129, the king then decided to march on Damascus but hampered by a powerful rainstorm, rendering the road impassible. Disappointed, Baldwin abandoned the siege and returned to Jerusalem.

Neither Bohemond II nor Buri would survive long. Bohemond was slain by the forces of Danishmendid Emir Gazi at the Battle of Ceyhan River in February 1130. He was succeeded by his daughter Constance of Antioch who would wed Raymond of Poitiers in 1136. Buri was fatally wounded by Assassins on 7 May 1131 although he lived for another year and was succeeded by his son Shams al-Mulk Isma'il.

== Fulk and Melisende ==
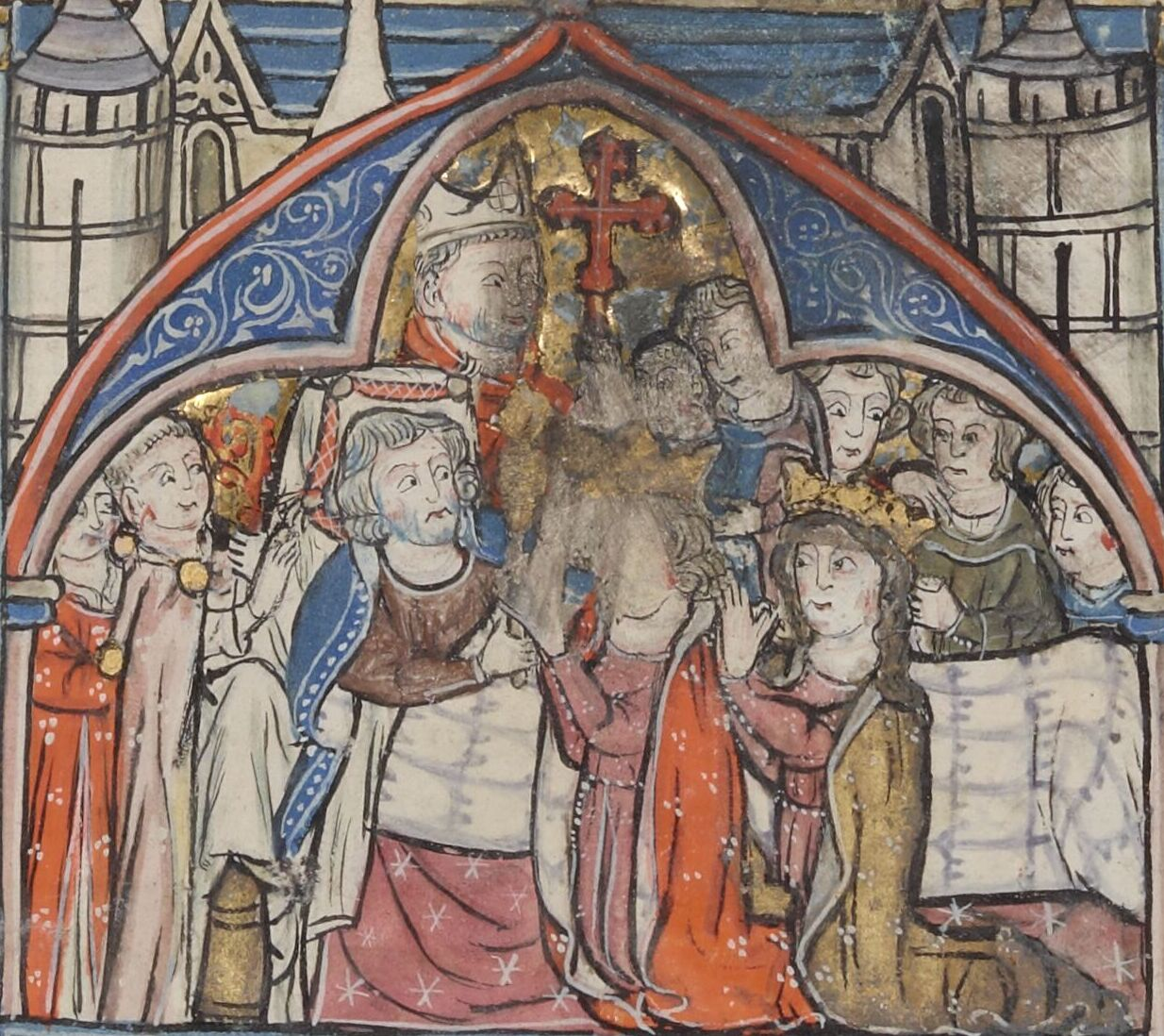
On his deathbed, Baldwin II bequeathed the kingdom to Fulk, Melisende, and their son Baldwin III.

Baldwin II had no sons which led to a concern over succession late in his kingship. The nobles of Jerusalem had arranged for the marriage of the king's eldest daughter Melisende to a French count Fulk V of Anjou, who became the heir-apparent to the throne. They married around 2 June 1129.

Fulk came to the Holy Land in 1129 to support the Franks' campaign against Damascus. He commanded a large contingent which departed Jerusalem after his wedding. Afterwards, he became active in royal affairs. Baldwin II died on 21 August 1131, and Fulk and Melisende were crowned king and queen of Jerusalem on 13 September. The new king immediately faced rebellion in Antioch and Tripoli, quickly quelled, but his major challenge would be the emergence of a new leader in Muslim Syria.

=== Rise of Zengi ===
In the mid-twelfth century, the Turkoman warlord Imad al-Din Zengi dominated Syria and Iraq, defining the politics of jihad. Son of Aq Sunqur al-Hajib, governor of Aleppo, Zengi served as a commander in the army of Mosul, lastly under al-Bursuqi. Following the latter's assassination in 1127, he became governor of Mosul. Aleppo was then under the sultanate in Baghdad and the next year, Zengi came to rule that city, uniting the two under a single ruler. He appointed Sawar ibn Aytegin as his governor in Aleppo. (Note: Zengi married Zumurrud Khatun in 1138. She was the widow of Taj al-Muluk Buri.)

Zengi's first foray against the Franks came in the spring of 1130 at the Battle of al-Atharib, a frontier city in Antioch. He was successful against the Jerusalem army, but did not occupy the city. He would return to the principality many times in the coming years.

Zengi regarded the conquest of Damascus as essential to uniting Syria and strengthening the struggle against the Christians. Beginning in 1130 with the Siege of Hama, he repeatedly pressured the city and sought to exploit divisions within its ruling Burid dynasty. The Damascene ruler Shams al-Mulk Isma'il, fearing that submission to Zengi would simply replace the threat of the Franks with his domination.

Zengi's campaigns against Damascus were particularly intense in 1135–1140, but the city's capable ruler, Mu'in al-Din Unur, successfully defended its independence. Unur allied with the Franks, demonstrating how the political divisions of Syria could lead Muslim and Christian powers to cooperate against a common rival. Zengi's attempts were further complicated by the intervention of emperor John II Komnenos and the competing interests of other Syrian rulers. Although he captured important territories such as after the Siege of Baalbek in 1139 and strengthened his control over northern Syria, he never succeeded in taking Damascus.

=== Sedition in the north ===
Joscelin I of Edessa died a week after Baldwin II, in August of 1131, and his son Joscelin II became count. In Antioch, Bohemond II's passing had made Constance, daughter of Bohemond and Alice of Antioch, ruler of Antioch. Alice, daughter of Baldwin II, set her sights on ruling Antioch and enlisted the aid of Joscelin II and Pons of Tripoli. Fulk responded and put down this rebellion in late 1132.

The conflict with Jerusalem left Tripoli exposed and Zengi responding by raiding the county. Meeting at the Battle of Rafaniyya in October 1133, Zengi's forces routed those of Pons. The few survivors took refuge in the castle at Montferrand and called on Fulk for help. The king's relief force arrived and met Zengi's army in a pitched battle that resulted in a stalemate. Both sides withdrew and returned home.

=== Zengi’s campaign against Antioch ===
In 1135, after his failure at Damascus, Zengi turned his attention northward and launched his Campaign against Antioch. Rather than attempting to storm the great city of Antioch itself, he attacked the network of fortresses and towns that protected it, weakening the principality and expanding his own control over northern Syria. His larger objective was to consolidate Muslim power there and drive back the Franks. Antioch was important in part as it controlled the strategic region linking Syria with Armenian Cilicia and the routes toward Aleppo.

The main army concentrated on the fortresses that guarded the approaches to Antioch. One after another, he captured important strongholds, beginning with al-Atharib on 17 April 1135. The fortresses at Zardana, Tell Aghdi, Ma'arrat al-Nu'man, Ma'arrat Misrin, and Kafartab soon fell. These were not merely isolated territorial gains but represented a serious contraction of Antiochene territory, removing much of the defensive belt that had protected the principality from the Muslim threat.

The capture of Ma'arrat al-Nu'man was significant because it lay on an important north–south route through Syria. Pons of Tripoli attempted to counter Zengi's advance and prevent him from controlling this corridor. The subsequent Frankish defeat at the Battle of Qinnasrin demonstrated that Zengi was strong enough to defeat their field armies as well.

Despite these victories, Zengi did not capture Antioch itself. The campaign was instead a methodical effort to isolate and weaken the principality. By taking its eastern fortresses and threatening its communications, Zengi reduced Antioch's strategic depth and made future attacks possible. The campaign also revealed the growing weakness and fragmentation of the northern Crusader states. Antioch could no longer assume that its fortifications alone would protect it from a powerful and increasingly organized Muslim ruler.

=== Damascus and Tripoli ===
Shams al-Mulk Isma'il, son of Buri, had been acting atabeg of Damascus since his father's stabbing in May 1132. On 11 December of that year, he recaptured Banias from the Franks, assuming the title atabeg upon Buri's death in June 1133. His policies made him many enemies. In office barely a year, Isma'il fled the city fearing for his life, offering Zengi the city of Damascus in exchange for his help. Zengi responded but his attack on the city was repelled. On 1 February 1135, Isma'il was murdered and his younger brother Shihab al-Din Mahmud was appointed as atabeg.

Mahmud's close advisor was his mother's lover Yusuf ibn Firuz. One evening in 1136, Mahmud was with Yusuf and a military commander Bazawash when the commander murdered Yusuf and demanded to be made chief minister. Bazawash took a more aggressive attitude to the Franks, launching a raid against Tripoli, with his forces guided through the surrounding mountain passes by local Christians with no loyalty to the Franks.

In March 1137, the Battle of Tripoli began with the Damascene forces invading the county, reaching as far as Pilgrim's Mountain. Pons of Tripoli led a counterforce from the city to meet the invaders and was soundly defeated. Pons managed to escape into the mountains but was captured and executed on 25 March 1137. Content with capturing several castles, Bazawash abandoned his quest and returned to Damascus. Pons was succeeded by his son Raymond II of Tripoli.

Zengi entered a truce with Mahmud and repaired to Syria, besieging first the Damascene fortress at Homs beginning in June 1137, then being defended by Unur. Raymond II responded, bringing his army and a contingent led by Fulk from Tripoli. At that point, Zenngi lifted the siege on 11 July and began the Battle of Ba'rin. Forces from Jerusalem, Antioch and Edessa were soon on the way, but Raymond's army suffered a defeat at the hands of the Muslims and the survivors took refuge in the castle at Montferrand.

Zengi, aware of the relief armies en route, sought a truce, offering safe passage for the Franks and a large tribute in exchange for Monterrand. Raymond accepted not knowing that the relieving forces were near, and the castle was surrendered to Zengi.

Zengi had wanted to marry Buri's widow Zumurrud Khatun but was prevented by Bazawash, fearful that the union would give too much power to his rival. Bazawash was murdered in May 1138 and Zengi married Zumurrud the next month. She then moved to Aleppo and, when Mahmud was killed in 1139, she invited her husband to conquer Damascus to avenge him.

=== The empire strikes back at Shaizar ===
In the summer of 1137, John II Komnenos captured several regions of Armenian Cilicia, taking Leo I of Armenia and his family as prisoners. The path to Antioch now clear, John began an attack on the principality on 29 August, and within a month, Raymond of Poitiers recognized the emperor as the overlord of Antioch. The emperor intended to use Antioch as a base for his offensive against Muslim Syria, the principal target being Aleppo, the center of Zengi’s power.

The next year, the Byzantine army crossed into Syria, accompanied by contingents from Antioch, soon joined by Joscelin II of Edessa and the Templars. He briefly laid siege to Biza'ah before beginning the Siege of Aleppo on 19 April 1138. Zengi had received warning of the Byzantine advance and had reinforced the city. John also found that the area around Aleppo lacked sufficient water to support a prolonged siege. Rather than become trapped before the city, he withdrew and moved to the south, capturing several smaller fortresses, including al-Atharib, Ma'arrat al-Numan, and Kafartab.

John's next objective was Shaizar, located on the Orontes River. Shaizar was the capital of an independent emirate ruled by the Banu Munqidh under emir Sultan ibn Munqidh .Unlike Aleppo, it was not directly controlled by Zengi, and John believed that Zengi might be reluctant to risk a major battle to save it. The city was strategically important because control of Shaizar would give the Byzantines a strong position from which to threaten other Muslim territories in Syria. The combined Christian army reached Shaizar on 28 April 1138 and began the Siege of Shaizar.

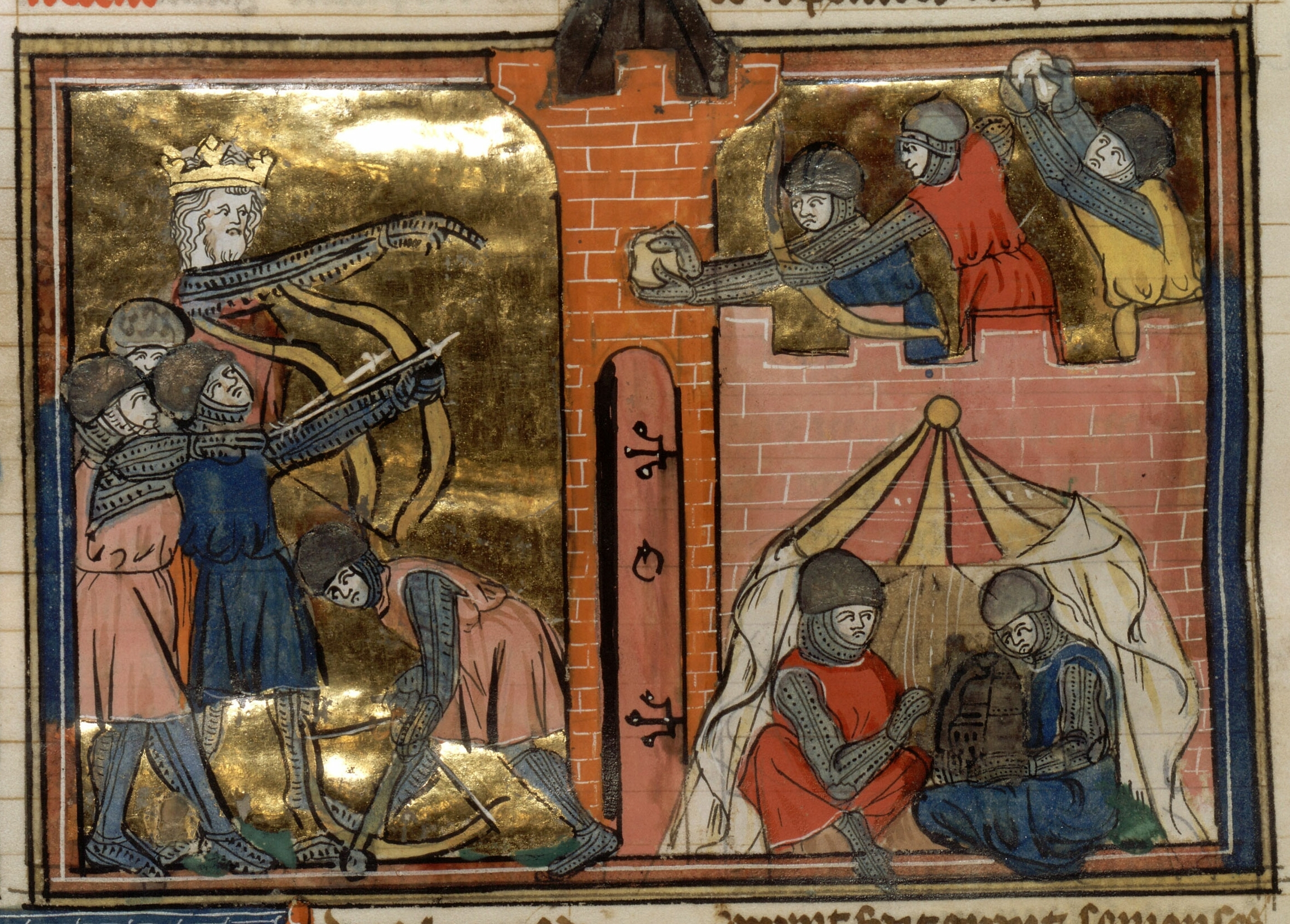
John II directs the siege of Shaizar while his allies sit inactive in their camp, French manuscript 1338.

The lower town fell easily, but the citadel was formidable, requiring significant time and resources. However, the Christian alliance was weak. Raymond and Joscelin II had little enthusiasm for the campaign and they had little desire to help John establish a position in Syria. Some accounts describe the princes as spending their time feasting and playing dice while John pressed the siege.

In response, Zengi gathered his forces to relieve Shaizar. He did not immediately risk a direct confrontation with John's much larger army, but his presence created a growing threat. His forces harassed Byzantine communications and maneuvered around the besieging army. Reinforcements also began arriving from other Muslim territories. At the same time, the Byzantine position elsewhere was becoming more complicated. Turkish forces threatened Cilicia, while other Muslim rulers were mobilizing against the invasion. John had to consider whether continuing the siege was worth the increasing danger to his army and his empire's territories.

By mid-May the siege had reached a stalemate. The Byzantines controlled the lower city but had failed to capture the citadel, while Zengi's relief army was approaching. John could either risk abandoning his siege equipment and marching out to fight Zengi or continue the siege while his own army became increasingly vulnerable. He chose a third option. Sultan ibn Munqidh, offered an annual tribute, and recognition of the Byzantine emperor as his overlord. John accepted the terms, and on 21 May 1138, the Byzantine army withdrew.

== Baldwin III of Jerusalem ==
The period of the early 1140s was relatively calm in the kingdom and northern Crusader states. Zengi had withdrawn from Syria and the conflicts between the Franks and Muslims were mostly petty. Then, Fulk of Jerusalem died on 7 November 1143 following a hunting accident. His queen Melisende assumed control of the kingdom and shared rule with their son Baldwin III of Jerusalem upon his coronation on 25 December 1143. That same year, the emperor John II Komnenos died in an accident on 8 April 1143 while preparing an attack on Antioch. He was succeeded by his son Manuel I Komnenos.

=== Fall of Edessa ===
The County of Edessa was the most exposed of the Crusader states and Joscelin II pursued a policy of isolationism towards his fellow Franks. In particular, he and Raymond of Poiters were openly hostile to each other and would not share in a mutual defense. Unlike his father, Joscelin II did not live in Edessa but rather in the nearby castle of Turbessel.

In August 1144, Rukn al-Dawla Da'ud, Artuqid emir of Hisn Kayfa, died and was succeeded by his son Kara Arslan. Threatened by Zengi, Kara looked to Edessa for support and Joscelin II set out with his field army to assist his new Muslim ally. The city of Edessa was dangerously exposed.

By November 1144, Zengi had settled his differences with his Muslim compatriots and he began his campaign against Edessa. Knowing that the count was away, Zengi had the opportunity to attack the city before he could return with sufficient forces to relieve it. Zengi's army approached the city and began the Siege of Edessa on 28 November 1144. The city itself was strongly fortified, with massive walls that had protected it over many years. This called for siege warfare rather than an immediate assault.

The defense of Edessa was led by the city's Latin and Armenian inhabitants, with important roles played by the archbishop Hugh of Edessa, the Armenian bishop Basil bar Shumna, and other local leaders. Joscelin II was unable to break through to the city. He appealed for assistance to other Christian rulers, but the response was inadequate. Raymond of Poitiers and other potential allies could not (or would not) provide an army capable of forcing Zengi to abandon the siege. The defenders consequently found themselves increasingly isolated.

Eventually Zengi's forces succeeded in undermining part of the city's defenses. On 24 December 1144, a major breach was opened, and Zengi's troops entered Edessa. The city fell rapidly, with many of the inhabitants killed, others captured. Zengi reportedly attempted to restrain indiscriminate slaughter once his troops had secured the city, although the conquest was still accompanied by considerable violence and enslavement. Joscelin II returned to Turbessel where the remnants of the county continued to exist for several more years.

The siege of Edessa therefore marked a major turning point in the history of the Crusades. It was not simply the loss of one city. Edessa had been the first Crusader state and a crucial buffer between the Christian territories of Syria and the Muslim powers of Mesopotamia and northern Syria. Its fall revealed the growing strength and organization of Muslim political leadership under Zengi and demonstrated the limitations of the fragmented Crusader states.

Shortly thereafter, an Armenian contingent in Edessa began plotting with Joscelyn II on how to retake the city. Together with Baldwin of Marash, Joscelyn assembled a force and regained control of the city on 27 October 1146. The defending Turkish garrison retreated to the citadel which Joscelyn was unable to subdue. Muslim forces marched from Aleppo with a force of 10,000, arriving at Edessa on 2 November, beginning the second Siege of Edessa. Trapped between the besieging troops and those in the citadel, the Christians soon fell and were massacred or enslaved.

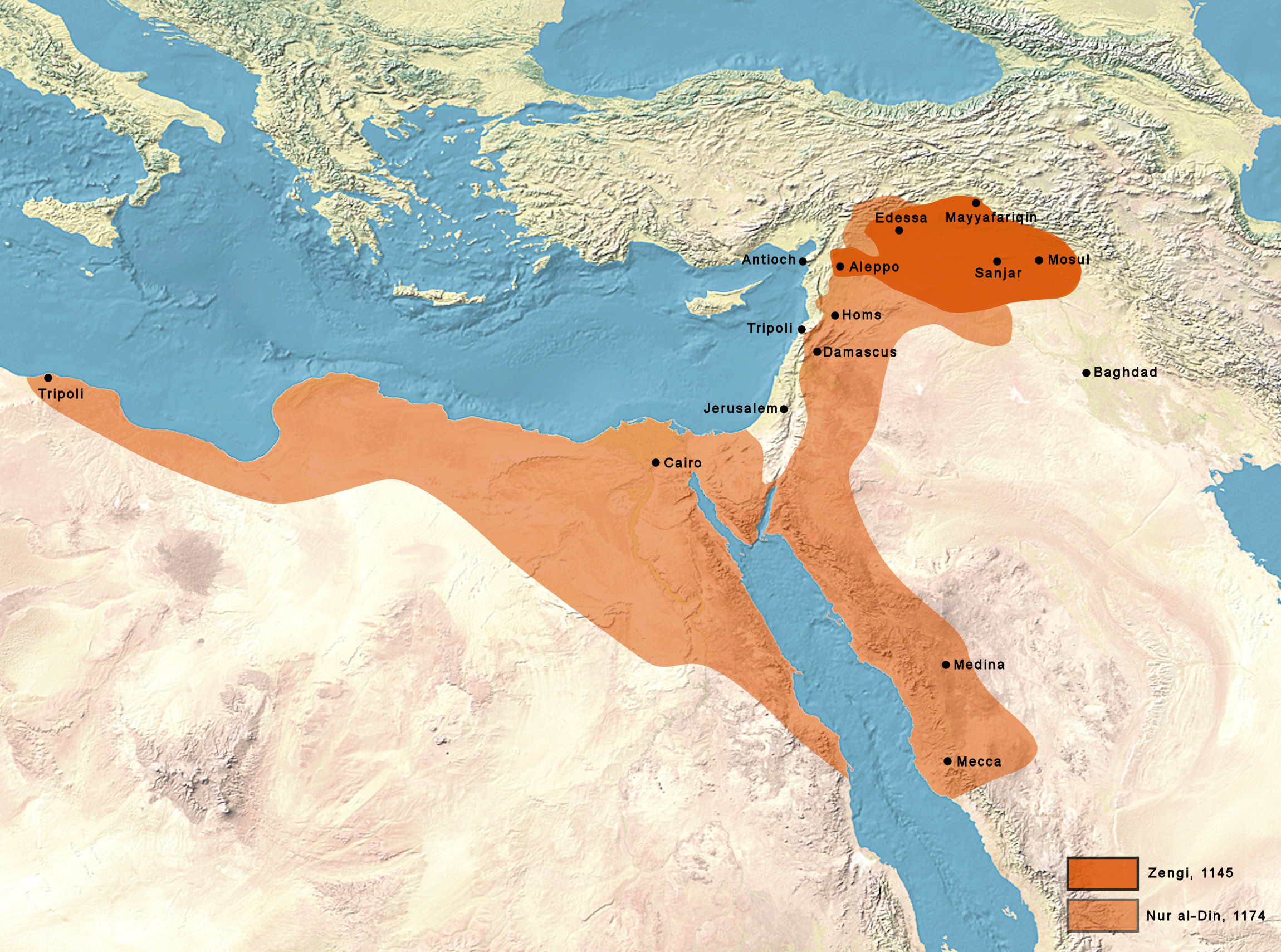
The Zengid state under Zengi in 1145, and expansion under Nur al-Din Zengi in 1174 CE.

=== Call for a new crusade ===
The news of the fall of Edessa eventually reached Europe, where it produced alarm and calls for a new crusade. Eugene III, pope since 15 February 1145, issued the papal bull Quantum praedecessores on 1 December, calling for a new expedition to defend the Holy Land and recover Christian territory. Bernard of Clairvaux became the most influential preacher of the resulting Second Crusade. European rulers, most notably Louis VII of France and Conrad III of Germany, eventually took the cross.

=== Death of Zengi ===
Ironically, Zengi himself did not live long enough to face the Second Crusade. On 14 September 1146, he returned to his tent to go to sleep. He grew irritated with his servant Yaranqash and threaten to kill him in the morning. The servant killed Zengi while he slept and beheaded him. His son Nur al-Din inherited his territories in Aleppo and continued his father's efforts to consolidate Muslim power in Syria continuing the Zengid dynasty.

== Summary ==
The capture of Jerusalem in 1099 established the Kingdom of Jerusalem under Godfrey of Bouillon supplementing the new Crusader states of Antioch and Edessa in the Levant. By 1109, the Franks conquered Tripoli, forming a chain of Latin Christian territories along the eastern Mediterranean. Baldwin I became king in 1100, strengthening the kingdom through military campaigns and the conquest of important coastal cities, including Acre, Beirut, and Sidon. (Note: Of the two remaining, Tyre would fall to the Franks in 1124 and Ascalon in 1153.) The Crusader states depended heavily on fortifications, Italian naval support, and reinforcements from Europe because they were surrounded by larger Muslim populations and rival powers.

During the first decades of the twelfth century, the Crusader states gradually became more secure but remained politically divided. Jerusalem expanded its control over much of the Palestinian coast, while Antioch and Edessa faced threats from Muslim rulers in northern Syria and Mesopotamia. Baldwin II succeeded Baldwin I in 1118 and worked to strengthen the kingdom's defenses, while the military orders—the Knights Templar and Knights Hospitaller—began to develop into important military institutions. The Franks also struggled to maintain unity among their own rulers, who frequently pursued separate political and territorial interests.

The balance began to shift dramatically with the rise of Zengi, ruler of Mosul and Aleppo. Zengi united important Muslim territories and launched increasingly effective attacks against the Crusader states. His capture of Edessa in December 1144 was a major turning point: it destroyed the first major Crusader city established after the First Crusade and demonstrated that the Franks could be defeated. The fall of Edessa shocked Western Europe and helped inspire the Second Crusade, which began in 1147. Thus, by 1146 the Crusader states had evolved from the fragile conquests of the First Crusade into established political entities, but their survival was increasingly threatened by the emergence of powerful and more unified Muslim rulers such as Nur ad-Din and Saladin.

== Bibliography ==
- El-Azhari, Taef (2016). Zengi and the Muslim Response to the Crusades: The Politics of Jihad. Routledge. ISBN 9780367870737.
- Asbridge, Thomas (2000). The Creation of the Principality of Antioch, 1098–1130. Boydell & Brewer. ISBN 9780851156613.
- Asbridge, Thomas (2004). The First Crusade: A New History. Oxford University Press. ISBN 9780195178234.
- Asbridge, Thomas (2010). The Crusades: The Authoritative History of the War for the Holy Land. HarperCollins. ISBN 9780061981364.
- Asbridge, Thomas (2012). The Crusades: The War for the Holy Land. Simon & Schuster. ISBN 9781849836883.
- Asbridge, Thomas (2013). "Baldwin II of Jerusalem's Campaigns against Aleppo (1124–1125) and Damascus (1129)". In Rogers, Clifford J.; DeVries, Kelly; France, John (eds.). Journal of Medieval Military History: Volume XI. Boydell & Brewer. pp. 73–94. ISBN 9781843838609.
- Baldwin, Marshall W., ed. (1969a). The First Hundred Years. Setton, Kenneth M. (ed.), A History of the Crusades, University of Wisconsin Press. ISBN 9780299048341.
- Baldwin, Marshall W. (1969b). "The Latin States under Baldwin III and Amalric I, 1143–1174" ( (PDF)). The First Hundred Years. pp. 528–562. Archived from the original on 2023-01-04.
- Berry, Virginia G. (1969). "The Second Crusade" ( (PDF)). The First Hundred Years. pp. 463–512. Archived from the original on 2023-01-04.
- Bosworth, Clifford E. (2004). The New Islamic dynasties: A Chronological and Genealogical Manual. Edinburgh University Press. ISBN 9780748606849.
- Brett, Michael (2019). "The Battles of Ramla, 1099–1105". The Fatimids and Egypt. Routledge. pp. 207–228. doi:10.4324/9780429427695-15. ISBN 9780429427695.
- Cahen, Claude (1969). "The Turkish Invasion: The Selchükids" ( (PDF)). The First Hundred Years. pp. 135–176. Archived from the original on 2023-01-04.
- Cate, James L. (1969). "The Crusade of 1101" ( (PDF)). The First Hundred Years. pp. 343–367. Archived from the original on 2023-01-04.
- Fink, Harold S. (1969). "The Foundation of the Latin States, 1099–1118" ( (PDF)). The First Hundred Years. pp. 368–409. Archived from the original on 2023-01-04.
- Gibb, Hamilton A. R. (1969a). "The Caliphate and the Arab States" ( (PDF)). The First Hundred Years. pp. 81–98. Archived from the original on 2023-01-04.
- Gibb, Hamilton A. R. (1969b). "Zengi and the Fall of Edessa" ( (PDF)). The First Hundred Years. pp. 449–462. Archived from the original on 2023-01-04.
- Gibb, H. A. R. (1969c). "The Career of Nūr-ad-Din" ( (PDF)). The First Hundred Years. pp. 513–527. Archived from the original on 2023-01-04.
- Heath, Ian (2019). Armies and Enemies of the Crusades, 1096–1291. Lulu Press. ISBN 9780244174873.
- Hillenbrand, Carole (1999). The Crusades: Islamic Perspectives. Routledge. ISBN 9780415929141.
- Lewis, Bernard (1969). "The Ismā'īlites and the Assassins" ( (PDF)). The First Hundred Years. pp. 99–134. Archived from the original on 2023-01-04.
- Lewis, Bernard (2003). The Assassins: A Radical Sect in Islam. Phoenix. ISBN 9781842124512.
- Lewis, Kevin James (2017). The Counts of Tripoli and Lebanon in the Twelfth Century. Taylor & Francis. ISBN 9781317052609.
- Lock, Peter (2006). The Routledge Companion to the Crusades. Routledge. ISBN 9781135131371.
- Madden, Thomas F. (2013). The Concise History of the Crusades. Critical Issues in World and International History (Third ed.). Rowman & Littlefield. ISBN 9781442215757.
- Mayer, Hans E. (1972). The Crusades [Geschichte der Kreuzzg̈e]. Translated by Gillingham, John. Oxford University Press. ISBN 9780198730972.
- Michaud, Joseph François (1881). History of the Crusades [Histoire des Croisades]. Translated by Robson, William. Three volumes. London: George Routledge and Sons.
- Morton, Nicholas (2018). The Field of Blood, the Battle for Aleppo and the Remaking of the Medieval Middle East. Basic Books. ISBN 9780465096701.
- Nicholson, Robert L. (1969). "The Growth of the Latin States, 1118–1144" ( (PDF)). The First Hundred Years. pp. 410–448. Archived from the original on 2023-01-04.
- Pernoud, Regine (2009). The Templars: Knights of Christ. Manchester University Press. ISBN 9781586173029.
- Phillips, Charles (2010). The Complete Illustrated History of the Crusades. Hermes House. ISBN 9780857231352.
- Phillips, Jonathan P. (1996). Defenders of the Holy Land: The Relation between the Latin East and the West, 1119–1187. Clarendon Press. ISBN 9780198205401.
- Raymond of Aguilers (1968). Historia Francorum qui ceperunt Iherusalem. Medieval Sourcebook, Fordham University.
- Richard, Jean C. (1999). The Crusades, c.1071–c.1291 [Histoire des croisades]. Translated by Birrell, Jean. Cambridge University Press. ISBN 9780521625661.
- Riley-Smith, Jonathan (1986). The Venetian Crusade of 1122–1124. De Ri Militari.
- Riley-Smith, Jonathan (1991). The Atlas of the Crusades. Facts on File. ISBN 9780816021864.
- Riley-Smith, Jonathan, ed. (2001). The Oxford Illustrated History of The Crusades. Oxford University Press. ISBN 9780192854285.
- Riley-Smith, Jonathan (2003). The First Crusade and Idea of Crusading. Bloomsbury Academic. ISBN 9780826467263.
- Riley-Smith, Jonathan (2014). The Crusades: A History. Bloomsbury Publishing. ISBN 9781472508799.
- Rousset, Paul (1957). Histoire des croisades. Payot. ISBN 9782228120203.
- Runciman, Steven (1951). A History of the Crusades, Volume One: The First Crusade and the Foundation of the Kingdom of Jerusalem. Cambridge University Press. ISBN 9780521347709.
- Runciman, Steven (1952). A History of the Crusades, Volume Two: The Kingdom of Jerusalem and the Frankish East, 1100–1187. Cambridge University Press. ISBN 9780521347716.
- Setton, Kenneth M., ed. (1969–1989). A History of the Crusades. Six Volumes. University of Wisconsin Press.
- Smail, R. C. (1995). Crusading Warfare, 1097–1193. Cambridge University Press. ISBN 9780521458382.
- Tyerman, Christopher (2006). God's War: A New History of the Crusades. Belknap Press. ISBN 9780674023871.
- Tyerman, Christopher (2009). The Crusades. Sterling Publishing Company. ISBN 9781402768910.
