= Tell Elkarame =

Tell Elkarame تل الكرامة
- Village
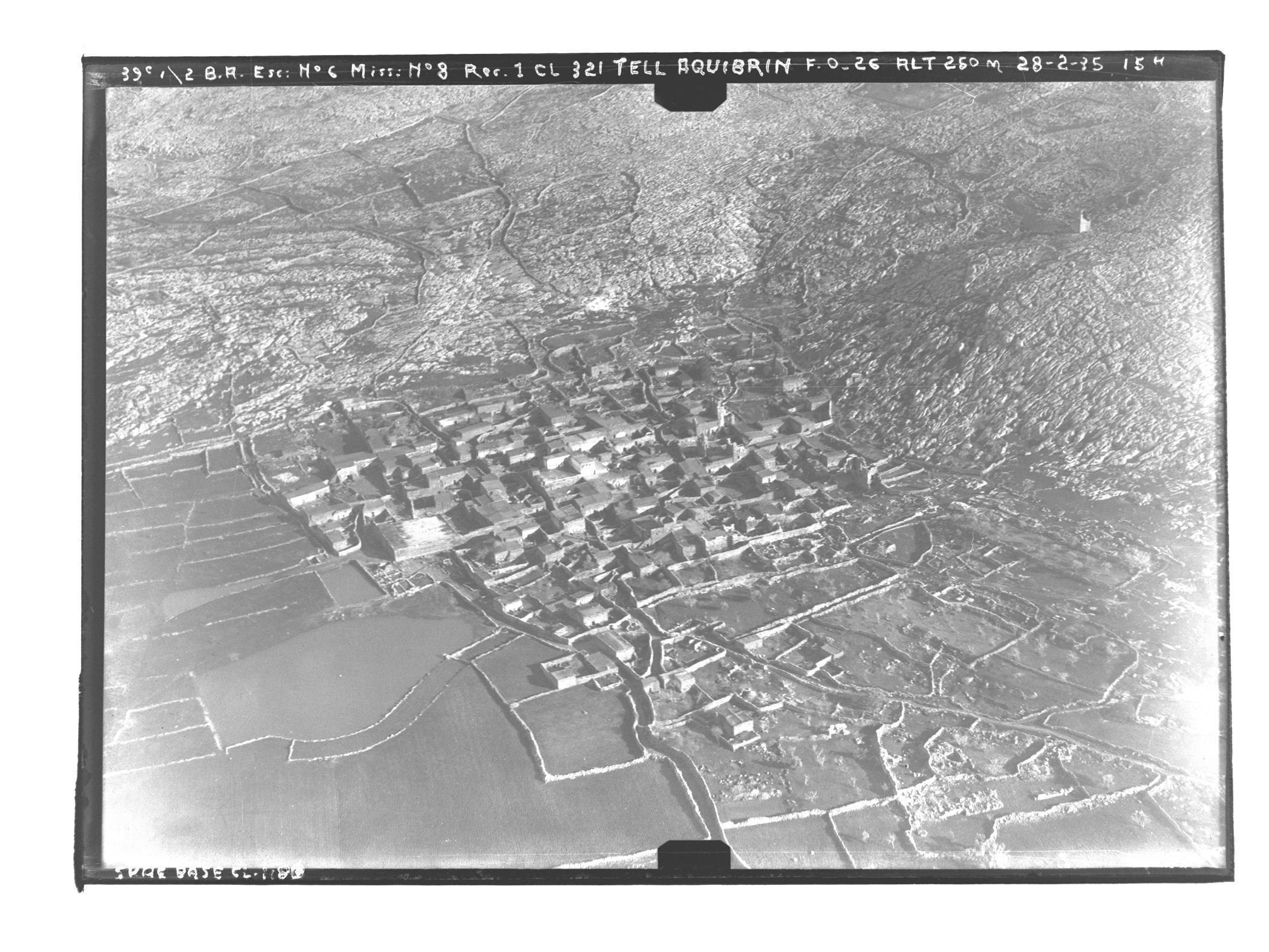
- 1935 aerial view of the village

- Location in Syria
- Country: Syria
- Governorate: Idlib
- District: Harem District
- Subdistrict: Al-Dana Nahiyah

Population (2004)
  - Total: 3,785
- Time zone: UTC+2 (EET)
  - Summer (DST): UTC+3 (EEST)
- City Qrya Pcode: C4122

Tell Elkarame (Arabic: تل الكرامة) is a Syrian village located in Al-Dana Nahiyah in Harem District, Idlib. According to the Syria Central Bureau of Statistics (CBS), Tell Elkarame had a population of 3,785 in the 2004 census.

== History ==
The village which was known as Tall 'Aqibrīn, contains a 900 metres (3,000 ft) long section of the Roman road that connected Antioch to Qinnasrin. Built probably under Marcus Aurelius (r. 161–180 AD), it was used by Justinian in 363 to quickly advance against the Sassanids on the Euphrates.

In the vicinity of Tall 'Aqibrīn occurred the Battle of Ager Sanguinis, where Roger of Salerno was killed.

== Sources ==
- Cahen, Claude (1940). La Syrie du nord à l'époque des croisades et la principauté franque d'Antioche (in French). P. Geuthner. doi:10.4000/books.ifpo.6169.
