= Battle of Teqoa =

1138 Fatimid victory in the Crusades

Battle of Teqoa (1138)
- Part of the Crusades
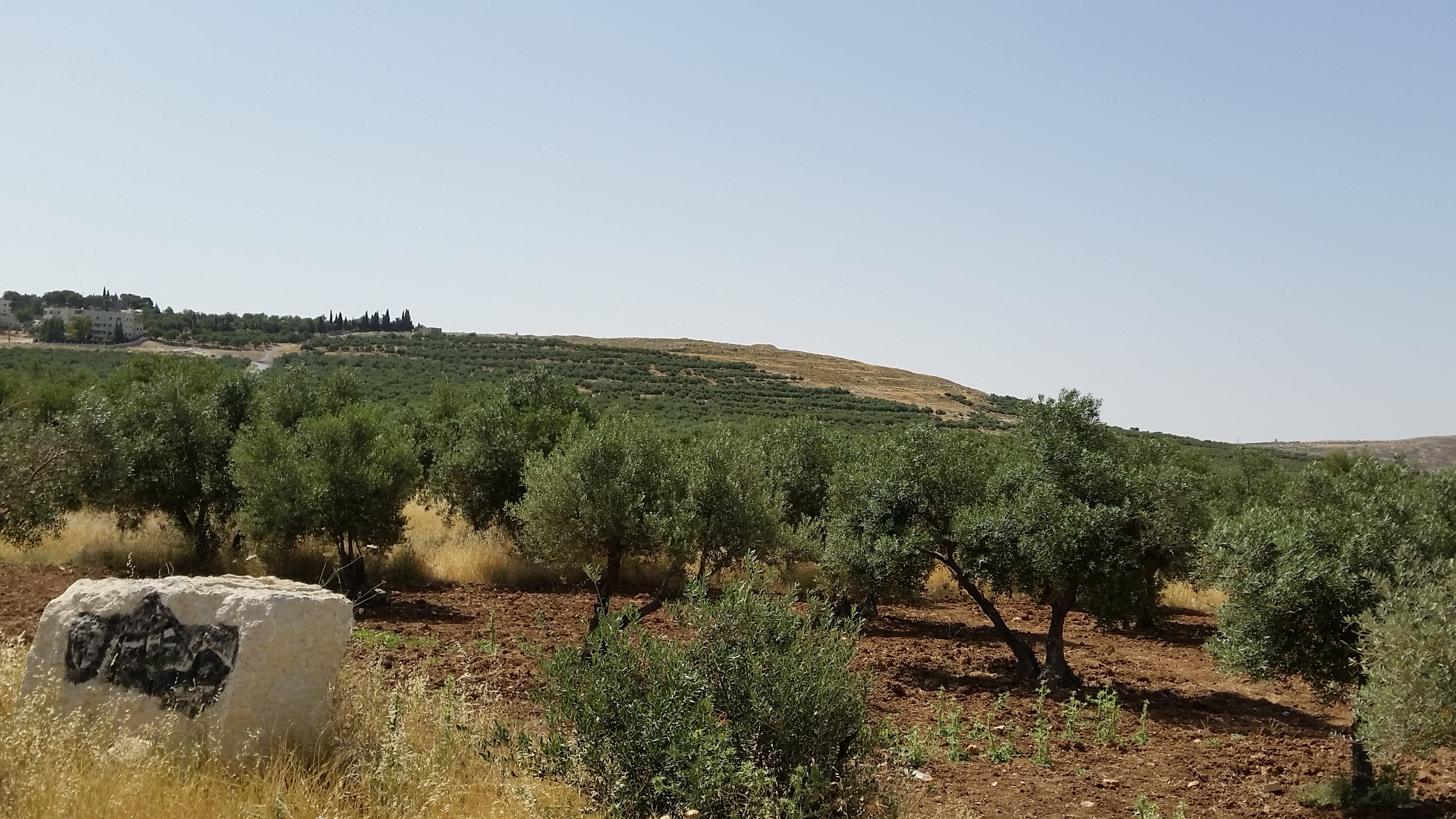
- Teqoa where the battle happened nearby
Date	1138
Location	Tuqu', Kingdom of Jerusalem
Result	Fatimid victory

Belligerents
Kingdom of Jerusalem; Knights Templar	Fatimid Caliphate

Commanders and leaders
Robert de Craon	

The Battle of Teqoa was a military engagement between the Crusaders and the Turkish raiders from Ascalon in the city of Teqoa. The Turks inflicted a defeat on the Crusaders. It was the first recorded battle of the Knights Templar.

== Battle ==
In 1138, Turkish raiders from Ascalon, which was under the Fatimid control, began raiding the territory of the Kingdom of Jerusalem. The Turks raided the city of Teqoa, which was considered the hometown of the prophet Amos. The majority of the inhabitants escaped the city when they learned of the Turkish raid. The Fatimid raiders entered Teqoa and sacked it. News of this raid reached Jerusalem. The Grand Master of the Knights Templar, Robert de Craon, gathered his Templar Knights and infantry against the marauders. The Fatimids learned of the relief force and retreated towards Hebron. The Crusaders managed to reoccupy the town easily. Instead of chasing them, the Crusaders began looting whatever remained of the Turks, thus leaving them scattered.

The Fatimids, seeing their disintegration, returned and began picking off the Crusaders one by one. The Crusaders attempted to regroup, but the Turks overwhelmed them. The Templars attempted to turn the tide with a horse charge but failed. The Crusaders retreated through the rugged landscape, leaving behind their armor and swords. The Turks massacred them with their arrows. At the end of the day, the plain between Hebron and Teqoa was filled with bodies. Many Templars were killed, including Otto von Montfaucon, who was mourned by his comrades. The Fatimids returned to Ascalon victorious.
