= Battle of Tripoli (1137) =

- Part of the Crusades
Date	March 1137
Location	Tripoli, Lebanon
Result	Damascene victory

Belligerents
County of Tripoli	Emirate of Damascus

Commanders and leaders
Count Pons (executed)	Bazawash

Strength
Unknown	Unknown

Casualties and losses
Heavy	Unknown

The Battle of Tripoli was a military engagement between the Burids of Damascus and the Crusader County of Tripoli. The Crusaders were badly defeated by the Turks, who captured and executed Pons, Count of Tripoli.

== Battle ==
On March 1137, the Burid military commander, Bazawash, launched a raid against the County of Tripoli. Bazawash led the Damascene troops that raided as far as the Citadel of Tripoli. This was the farthest place a Muslim army reached since its capture by the Crusaders. The local Christians held no loyalty to the Frankish lords and secretly guided the Turks into the passes of Lebanon to the coastal plains. The ruler of Tripoli, Pons initially took refuge behind the walls of Tripoli, hoping this was a mere raid by the Turks. After seeing the Turks advancing into the city, he launched a sally with his army against them.

The Crusader army was already in desperation and weakness. The battle was disastrous for the Crusaders. Few of the nobility fell, but a large number of infantry were killed. Pons managed to escape from the battlefield and hide in the mountains; however, he was captured by local Christians, who handed him over to Bazawash who ordered his execution. Among the captured was the bishop of Tripoli, Gerald. He was released in the end, as the Turks failed to recognize it was the bishop since he was wearing military garb. The Turks did not attack Tripoli and retreated with their loot to Damascus.

The battle seriously weakened the County of Tripoli, which lost many men and had its lands devastated. The successor of Pons, Raymond II, took reprisals against the traitors, who were taken to Tripoli and executed.
