= Tell Aghbar, Jarabulus =

Tell Aghbar Bozhüyük
- Village
- Location of Tell Aghbar in Syria
- Coordinates: 36.72982°N 37.77885°E
- Country: Syria
- Governorate: Aleppo
- District: Jarabulus
- Subdistrict: Ghandoura

Population (2004)
  - Total: 442

Tell Aghbar (Arabic: تل أغبر; Turkish: Bozhüyük), is a village in northern Aleppo Governorate, northern Syria. With 442 inhabitants, as per the 2004 census, Tell Aghbar administratively belongs to Ghandoura Subdistrict within Jarabulus District. The village is inhabited by Turkmen.
