= Siege of Corfu (1122–1123) =

1122–1123 Venetian siege

- Part of Venetian Crusade and Venetian–Byzantine War (1122–1126)
| Date | September/October 1122 – March 1123 |
| Location | Corfu |
| Result | Byzantine victory |

Belligerents
| Byzantine Empire | Republic of Venice |

Commanders and leaders
| Unknown | Domenico Michiel |

Strength
| Unknown | Maximum of 15,000 men 72–120 vessels |

Casualties and losses
| Unknown | Unknown |

The Siege of Corfu (1122–1123) was a purported military operation led by the Republic of Venice against the Byzantine Empire during the opening phase of the Venetian Crusade. The alleged Siege resulted in no territorial changes.

== Background ==
Following the devastating defeat at the Battle of Ager Sanguinis in 1119, King Baldwin II of Jerusalem urgently sought military assistance from Catholic Europe. However, major powers like Pope Callixtus II and Holy Roman Emperor Henry V were preoccupied with the Investiture Controversy. The Republic of Venice emerged as the primary candidate willing to assist, driven by a desire to secure lucrative trading posts in the Levant and by retaliation for John II Komnenos's attempt to reduce Venice’s commercial privileges. After receiving a papal blessing in 1122, a crusade was officially announced to support the struggling Crusader states. On August 8, 1122, a fleet estimated between 72 and 120 vessels carrying roughly 15,000 men (though likely exaggerated) departed from the Venetian Lagoon under the command of Domenico Michiel.

== Expedition and Siege ==
The Venetian fleet, under the command of Doge Domenico Michiel, departed in August 1122 but progressed down the Adriatic coast at a remarkably slow pace. Naval historian John H. Pryor calculated the fleet's average speed during this journey at only 0.8 knots. This cautious progress, intended to exert political pressure on Byzantine Emperor John II Komnenos, who had refused to renew Venice's trade privileges, meant the fleet did not reach Corfu until September or October 1122. This led to a prolonged assault on a key Byzantine stronghold on the island. The siege, however, proved more difficult than anticipated, lasting through the winter of 1122 and into 1123. This delay caused significant friction between the Venetian leadership and the various European Knights and pilgrims, who viewed the campaign against fellow Christians as a distraction from their religious vows in Jerusalem. The stalemate at Corfu only ended when urgent reports arrived from the Levant detailing the capture of King Baldwin II by the Artuqid leader Belek. Recognizing that the survival of the Latin East was at stake, the Venetians abandoned the siege in the spring of 1123 and set sail for Acre to fulfill their original mission.

== Historical authenticity ==
Modern scholarship, notably Maximilian Lau, questions the scale and even the occurrence of a full-scale siege. Lau points out that while the Historia Ducum Veneticorum claims a siege took place, the contemporary chronicler Fulcher of Chartres mentions only that the fleet wintered on the island without any hostilities. Furthermore, Lau argues that the lack of a military response from Emperor John II suggests the event was a limited raid of little consequence rather than a formal opening of a war.
