= Venetian–Byzantine War (1122–1126) =

Eastern Mediterranean war between 1122 and 1126

Venetian–Byzantine war
- The Aegean sea during the Byzantine era.
Date	1122–1126
Location	Adriatic Sea, Aegean Sea
Result	Venetian victory
Territorial changes	Restoration of commercial privileges and tax exemptions for Venice

Belligerents
Byzantine Empire	Republic of Venice

Commanders and leaders
John II Komnenos	Domenico Michiel

The war between Venice and Byzantium fought between 1122 and 1126 was the first armed conflict between the two powers of the Eastern Mediterranean, fought by the Republic of Venice and the Byzantine Empire for control of eastern trade, which ended with the consolidation of the mercantile predominance of the Maritime Republic in the Levant.

== Prelude ==
In 1082, the Byzantine Emperor (Basileus) Alexios I Komnenos, in exchange for the invaluable assistance received from the Venetian fleet in the war against the Normans led by Robert Guiscard, issued a Golden Bull exempting Venetian merchants from all taxes in the main ports and cities of the Byzantine Empire.

The situation thus created quickly proved particularly burdensome for the Empire's coffers, so much so that, upon Alexios' death in 1118, the new Emperor John II refused to renew the Bull, despite the protests of Venetian ambassadors, preferring instead to support trade with the rival Republics of Pisa and Genoa.

Venice's mercantile interests, which were the cornerstone of its entire social and political system, were thus affected, radically changing its relationship with its former motherland (the Duchy of Venice was, in fact, a former Byzantine duchy). The new Doge, Domenico Michiel, asked the Emperor to renew the chrysobolla, but, faced with a flat refusal, he prepared for war, seeking the perfect excuse to unleash it and reassert his power over the seas of the Levant.

The occasion was the capture of King Baldwin II of Jerusalem by the Saracens and the request for aid sent by the Crusader States of Outremer: Venice promptly offered to come to the rescue, eager to send a powerful fleet to the East.

== Conflict ==
=== The First Phase of the Venetian-Byzantine War ===
On August 8, 1122, after appointing his son and nephew as regents with the title of Venetiarum Praesides, the Doge set sail from the port of Lido with a fleet of forty galleys, twenty-eight beaked ships, and four cargo ships, loaded with pilgrims and crusaders, to aid Baldwin, but above all to carry out a punitive expedition against the Byzantine Empire.

All this occurred approximately at the same time that Emperor John II was subduing the Pechenegs in the Battle of Beroia.

A stopover was made in Bari, and then a first attack was directed on Byzantine Corfu, which was besieged for six months, but without appreciable results. Thus, after the winter passed and realizing that it could not be conquered, the Venetians moved decisively towards the Levant.

In 1123 the Venetian fleet devastated Chios, Lesbos, Rhodes and finally reached Cyprus, where it learned of the position of the Egyptian fleet.

=== The Truce: Venice and the Crusades ===
From that moment, the Republic of Venice was engaged against the Saracens, defeating the Egyptians at Ascalon and plundering a great deal of wealth. Michiel then received an embassy from the Patriarch of Jerusalem, Guarmondo, the Grand Constable of the Kingdom, William of Bari, and the Secretary of Syria, Pagano, who invited him to spend Christmas in Jerusalem.

The following year, faced with a solemn promise from the kingdom's leaders to reserve a Venetian quarter in every city of the Kingdom and to exempt Venetian merchants from all duties, the fleet of San Marco moved against Sidon and Tyre, which it conquered by deception on July 30, 1124, after a five-month siege.

=== The Second Phase of the Venetian-Byzantine War ===
Finally freed from his commitments to the Christian states overseas, the Doge turned his attention back to his primary target: the Byzantine basileus. Samos and Andros were devastated, after which the fleet returned to the Adriatic to confront Stephen II of Hungary, who threatened Venetian possessions in Dalmatia. Among the numerous spoils, the precious bodies of Saint Isidore and Saint Donatus were brought back to Venice.

Finally, in 1126, the Venetians returned to sea against the Byzantines, attacking Methoni and Cephalonia. Faced with the devastation of his maritime possessions, the Emperor finally resolved to send ambassadors to sue for peace.

== Epilogue ==
In 1126, John II Komnenos issued a new Chrysobull, recognizing all the previous rights granted by his father and augmenting them with new exemptions and monopolies. The emperor's only option was to grant further concessions to the republics of Genoa and Pisa, hoping to counterbalance Venetian power over its seas. However, the consequences of the conflict were the strengthening of a deadly embrace between the Venetian and Byzantine economies, strangling and suffocating Greek trade to the benefit of the Italian Maritime Republics.

This situation triggered a vortex of mutual suspicion, betrayal, and rivalry between the mercantile republics and the Empire, often erupting in outright acts of piracy, which ultimately culminated in the subsequent conflict between Byzantium and Venice during the reign of Manuel I Komnenos and the wars fought between Genoa, Pisa, and Venice.

== Bibliography ==
- AA.VV. Storia di Venezia, Treccani, 12 Voll., 1990–2002
- Diehl, Charles: La Repubblica di Venezia, Newton & Compton editori, Roma, 2004. ISBN 88-541-0022-6
- Guglielmo di Tiro: Historia rerum in partibus transmarinis gestarum.
- Niceta Coniata: Grandezza e catastrofe di Bisanzio.
- Romanin, Samuele: Storia documentata di Venezia, Pietro Naratovich tipografo editore, Venezia, 1853.
