= Siege of Tyre (1111–1112) =

1111–1112 battle of the Crusaders

- Part of the Crusades
Date	29 November 1111 – 10 April 1112
Location	Tyre, Levant
Result	Fatimid victory: Crusader withdrawal

Belligerents
Kingdom of Jerusalem; Supported by: Byzantine navy	Fatimid Caliphate; Supported by: Burid dynasty

Commanders and leaders
Baldwin I of Jerusalem	Izz Al-Mulk; Supported by: Toghtekin

Strength
Unknown number of Crusaders; Twelve Byzantine vessels	Unknown

Casualties and losses
2,000 Crusaders	400 men

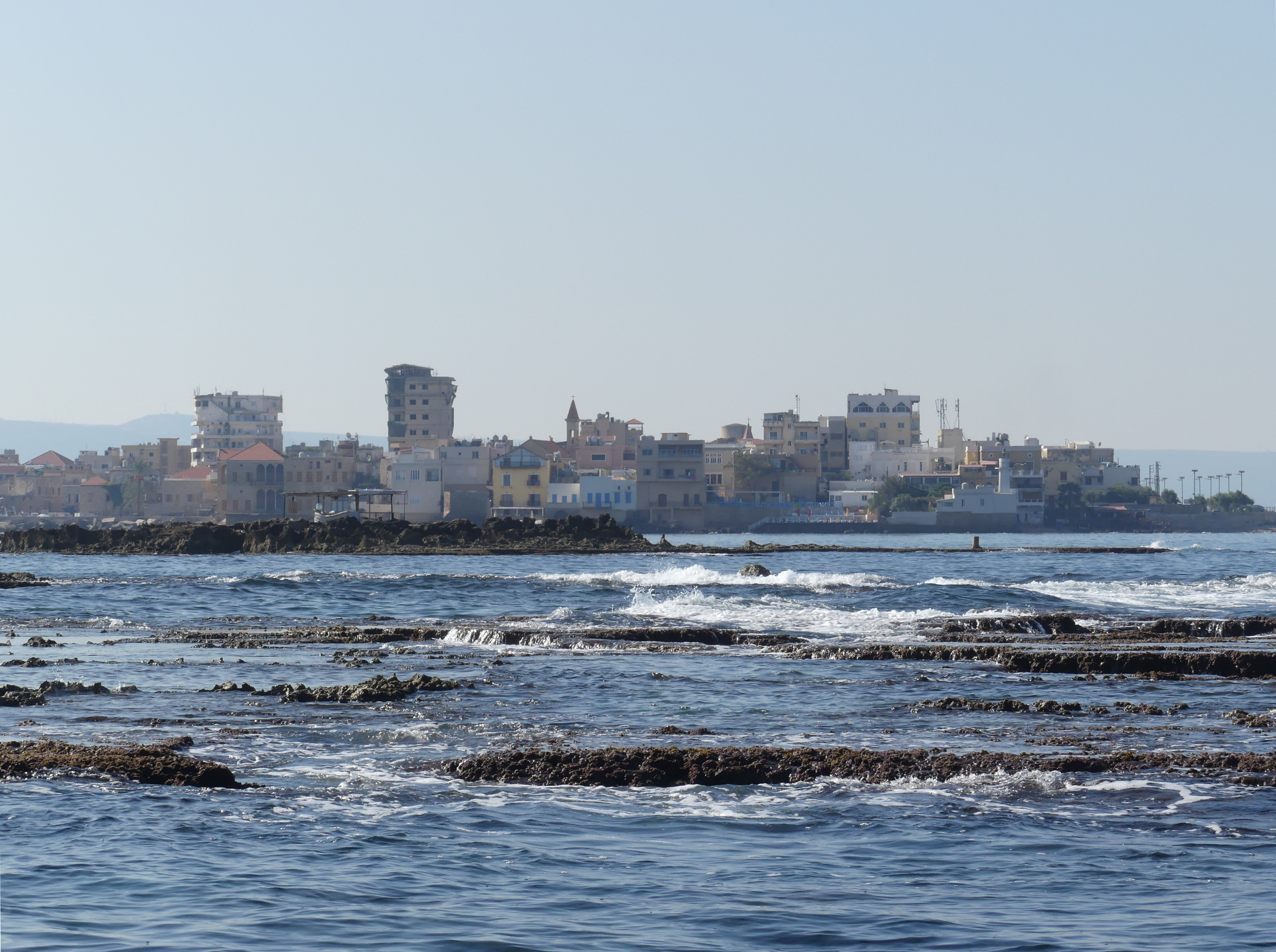
Modern-day Tyre, as seen from the coast

The siege of Tyre took place from 29 November 1111 to 10 April 1112 when the coastal city of Tyre, in what is now Lebanon and was then in the hands of the Fatimid Caliphate, was besieged by the Crusader King Baldwin I of Jerusalem. In the previous years, Baldwin had taken the cities of Acre, Tripoli, Sidon and Beirut from the Fatimids. Tyre was besieged by land, leaving the sea open as Baldwin lacked a fleet. Although the Fatimid navy failed to help the city, the siege was relieved by the Turkoman ruler of Damascus, Toghtekin. Toghtekin installed his own governor in the city, which however remained nominally under Fatimid sovereignty. Fatimid rule was restored in 1122, but finally the city was lost to the Crusaders in 1124.

== Background ==
Tyre avoided attacks from the Crusaders during the First Crusade by paying tribute as the Crusaders marched on Jerusalem. In 1107, Baldwin I, the first king of Jerusalem, attempted to capture Tyre but soon abandoned the siege. After the fall of Tripoli and Beirut, many Muslim residents from those towns sought refuge in Tyre, which remained under Fatimid control. By 1111, the Crusaders controlled most of the coast, with Tyre and Ascalon as the last major coastal cities still outside their reach.

During this period, Tyre, in defiance, ceased its tribute payments to the Crusaders, as noted by Albert of Aix. William of Tyre reports: "Tyre lies in the bosom of the sea like an island closed round about by waters. It is the capital and metropolis of Phoenicia." According to Ibn al-Qalanisi, Izz Al-Mulk, the Egyptian governor of Tyre, persuaded Toghtekin, the ruler of Damascus, to help defend the city. In exchange for 20,000 bezants, Toghtekin sent 200 cavalry and 500 archers, along with additional soldiers from Jabal Amil, who fortified Tyre's defenses, spreading across its ramparts.

== Siege ==
On 29 November 1111, Baldwin laid siege to Tyre without naval support. He gathered all available troops and ordered the construction of siege engines, employing tactics such as skirmishes and using iron grapnels produced by a refugee from Tripoli. Eustace Grenier funded two wooden siege towers, which were taller than Tyre's stone towers. William of Tyre writes about the besieged:

They met each scheme by a similar one and strove to repel in kind the injuries that were being inflicted upon them. They brought together great quantities of stones and cement, mounted two towers which were practically opposite our machines, and began to build them higher. Thus within a very short time these rose far above the wooden machines opposed to them outside the walls. From there the defenders hurled fire upon the engines below and were prepared to bum everything, unopposed.

—

While Baldwin continued the siege, a Byzantine embassy arrived with 12 vessels. The Byzantines, having good relations with the Fatimids, refused to attack without compensation. Hence, the Byzantines proposed an alliance against Tancred to recover their cities lost to him. Since both parties were not able to reach a compromise, the Byzantines did not supply the attackers with provisions.

Albert of Aix recounts that a knight named Reinfrid, bribed with a thousand bezants to escort Tyrian nobles carrying gifts to Damascus, reported to Baldwin who ordered his forces to ambush and seize the convoy. In another account, Toghtekin had sent a carrier pigeon to establish contact with Tyre, but it was intercepted by an Arab in the service of the Crusaders. The message was delivered to Baldwin, who ordered some men to disguise themselves and meet the delegation from Damascus. Ultimately, the disguised men captured the delegation, leading to their execution. Afterwards, the city defenders responded with a bold charge against the Crusader camp but were repelled, and 200 knights including William of Wanges entered Tyre, but they were captured and killed. However, the Tyrians managed to burn the siege engines using pitch, sulfur, wax, and fat, mixed together with tow to a big tree, then burning it and letting it fall onto the wooden siege engines.

Toghtekin advanced on Tyre with 20,000 cavalry, defeating a Crusader detachment of 700 men-at-arms and 60 cavalry who were gathering supplies. As a result, Baldwin lifted the siege and withdrew to Acre on 10 April 1112 after losing around 2,000 men. However, the Crusaders retained control of most nearby villages.

== Aftermath ==
A decade later, the Fatimids sold Tyre to Toghtekin, who installed a garrison there. However, the Crusaders could not capture Tyre until the Venetian Crusade from 1122 to 1124.
