= Venetian Crusade =

12th-century crusade

- Part of the Crusades
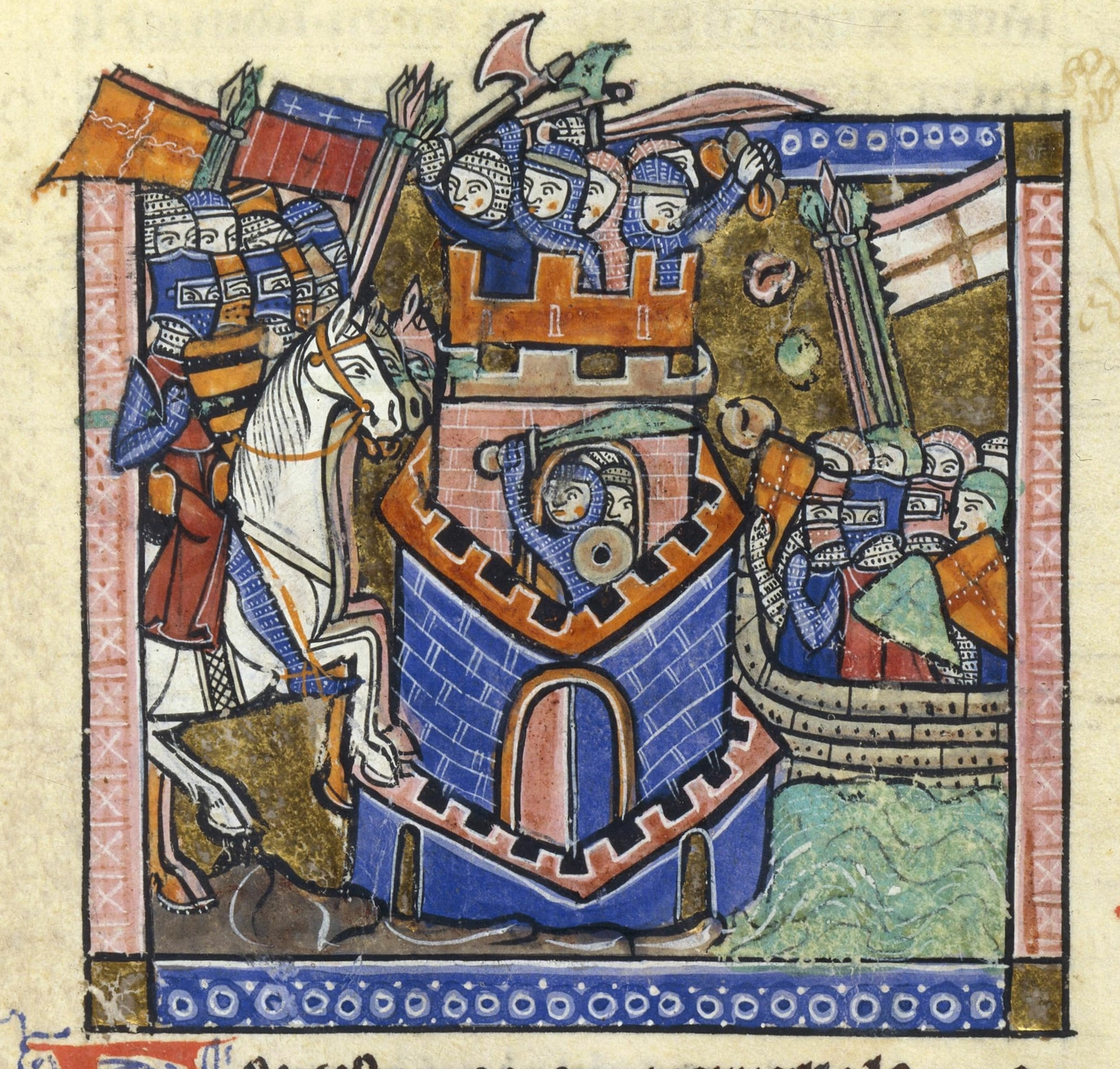
- Siege of Tyre by the Crusaders and the Venetian fleet
Date	1122–1124
Location	Levant
Result	Crusader victory
Territorial changes	Tyre ceded to Jerusalem

Belligerents
Republic of Venice; Kingdom of Jerusalem; County of Tripoli	Fatimid Caliphate; Seljuk Empire; Burid dynasty

Commanders and leaders
Domenico Michele; William I of Bures; Pons of Tripoli	Toghtekin

The Venetian Crusade of 1122–1124 was an expedition to the Holy Land launched by the Republic of Venice that succeeded in capturing Tyre. It was an important victory at the start of a period when the Kingdom of Jerusalem would expand to its greatest extent under Baldwin II of Jerusalem. The Venetians gained valuable trading concessions in Tyre. Through raids on Byzantine territory both on the way to the Holy Land and on the return journey, the Venetians forced the Byzantines to confirm, as well as extend, their trading privileges with the empire. Throughout this article we shall refer to many Levantine places, from large cities to small towns and villages. You can consult this map for the location of such settlements.

== Cause of the Crusade ==
=== Coronation of Baldwin II ===
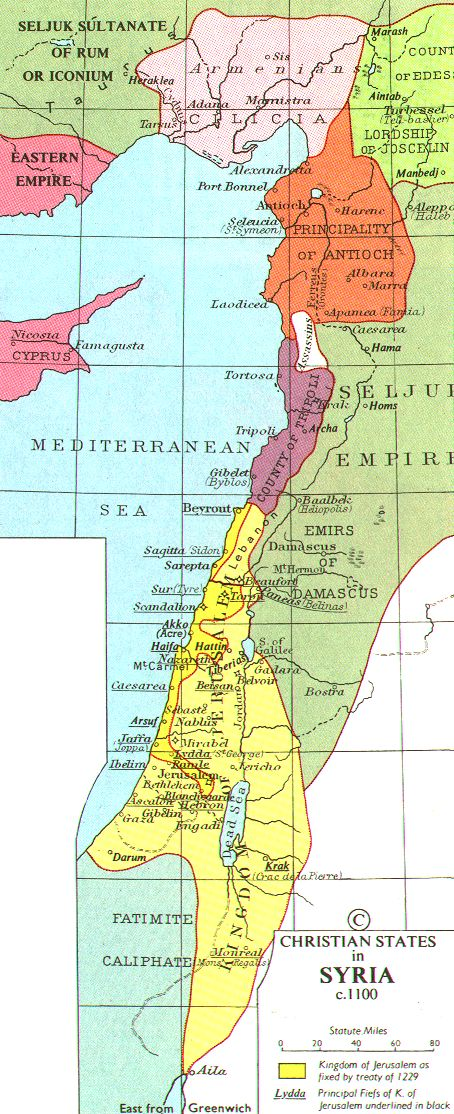
Crusader States around 1118

The King of Jerusalem for 18 years, Baldwin I of Jerusalem died on 2 April 1118 during a successful invasion of Fatimid Egypt. Dying in the Egyptian city of El Arish, he left the Kingdom of Jerusalem and the Outremer in a succession crisis. According to the contemporaneous Albert of Aachen he had willed the kingdom to his eldest brother, Eustace III of Boulogne, "if by chance he would come", but also stipulated that Baldwin of Bourcq, Count of Edessa, should be elected king if Eustace were unable to come "because of his age". Baldwin of Bourcq arrived in Jerusalem around the day when the late king's body was carried into the town. Albert of Aachen states that Baldwin had come to celebrate Easter in Jerusalem without having any knowledge of the king's death. Decades later, William of Tyre recorded that Baldwin had been informed of his kinsman's death during his journey to Jerusalem.

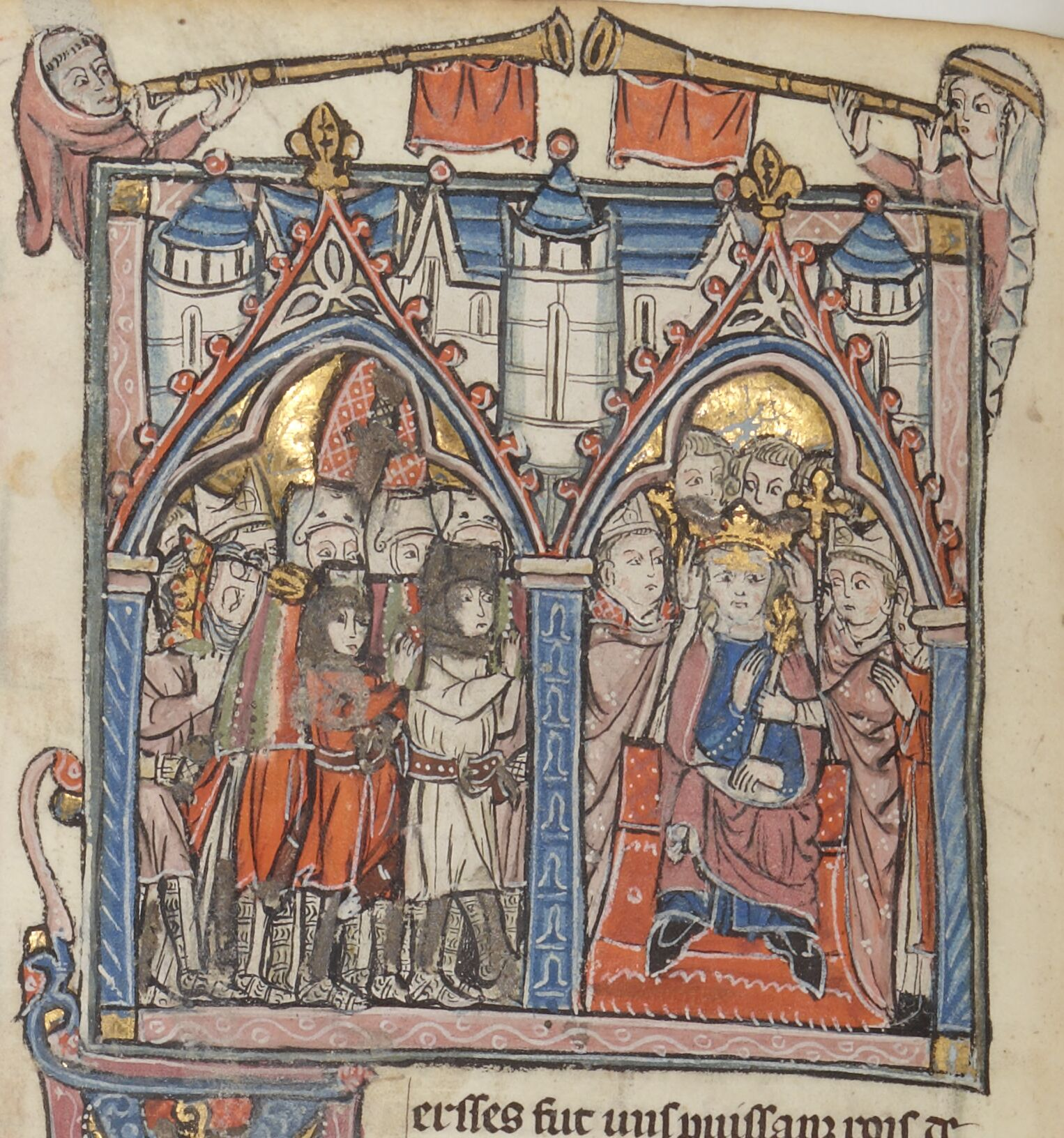
Coronation of Baldwin II

The question of Baldwin I's succession divided the barons and the prelates, according to William of Tyre. The Kingdom of Jerusalem was in immediate and desperate need of a king. The vizier of the Fatimid Caliphate, Al-Afdal Shahanshah desired revenge for the Crusader invasion of Egypt, and he saw the interregnum in Jerusalem as his opportunity. Al-Afdal gathered the Fatimid army at Ashdod from where he made an alliance with another enemy of the Kingdom of Jerusalem, the Burid atabeg of Damascus, Zahir al-Din Toghtekin. The Crusaders knew that they had no chance to face this invasion without a leader so the highest-ranking prelate Arnulf of Chocques, the Latin patriarch of Jerusalem, and Joscelin of Courtenay, lord of the Principality of Galilee, argued that Baldwin should be elected without delay to avoid an interregnum. Baldwin seemed like the right choice as he was a relative of Baldwin I and was an experienced leader and soldier. He had been in the First Crusade and then ruled the County of Edessa for 18 years, fighting the many Turks and Armenians of the region multiple times. Still, others maintained that the crown should first be offered to Eustace in accordance with Baldwin I's last will. According to the Medieval European succession laws of the period, Eustace was the proper successor; Baldwin I had no children meaning that his eldest surviving brother should succeed him, who was in this case Eustace.

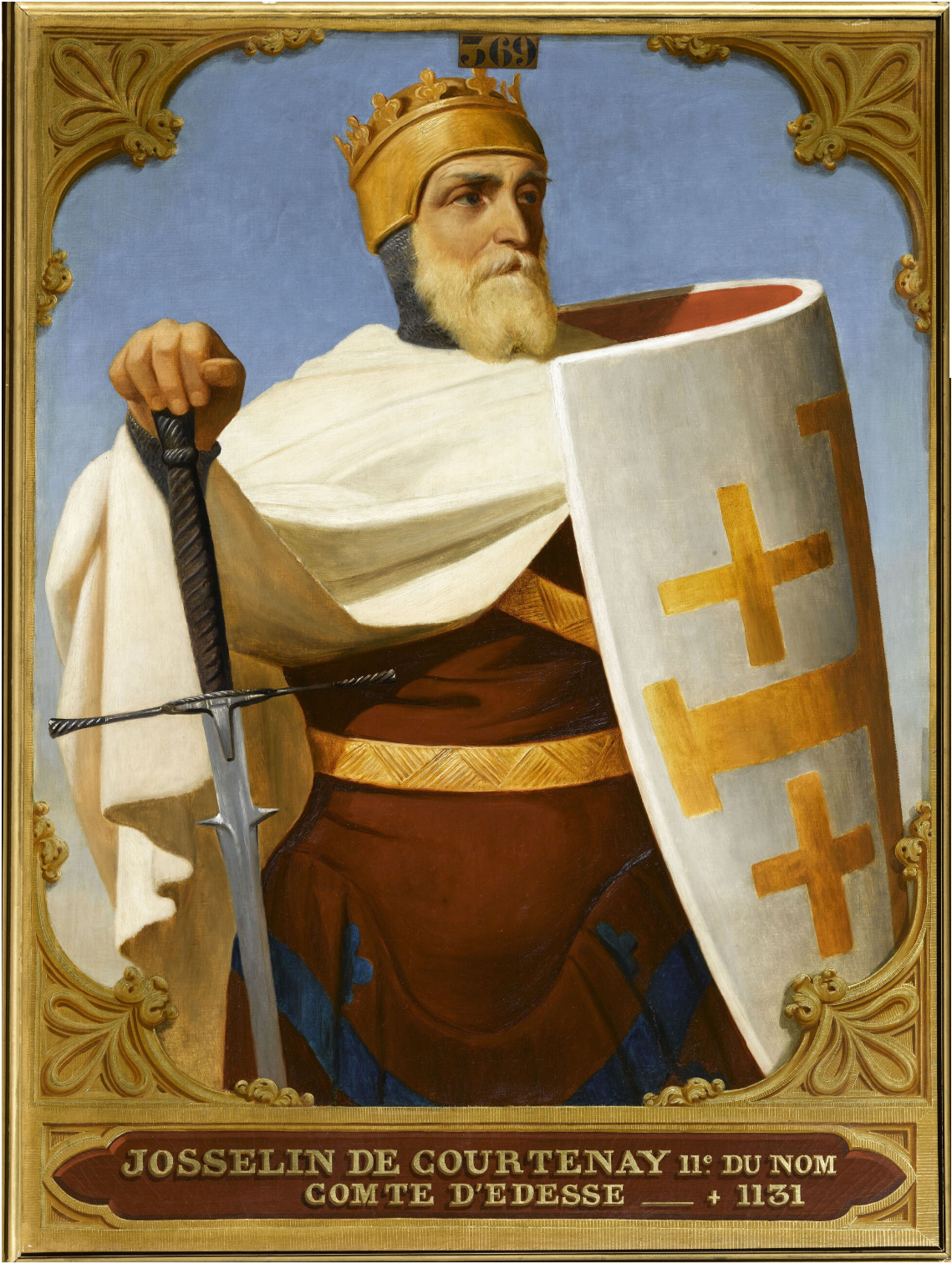
Joscelin of Courtenay and of Edessa

Some "great nobles", whom William of Tyre did not name, were appointed to inform Eustace of his brother's death and offer him the throne. Eustace was at first uninterested as he preferred to rule his safer European holdings in his County of Boulogne rather than risk it all in the Levant. He was only convinced to accept it after his courtiers shamed him for not fulfilling his family legacy and duties. After he was convinced, Eustace began the journey all the way to the Levant.

Baldwin II was anointed on Easter Day 14 April 1118, before Eustace could arrive and stake his claim. His coronation was delayed for unknown reasons. Historian Malcolm Barber believes that Baldwin wished to be crowned along with his wife, who was not in the kingdom at the time. Baldwin promised the County of Edessa to Joscelin of Courtenay, but Joscelin remained in the kingdom to secure the defence of Galilee and to help fight off the incoming Fatimid-Burid invasion. Baldwin convened the noblemen to an assembly "on an appointed day" to receive "fealty and an oath of allegiance from them", according to Albert of Aachen. Joscelin, Pons of Tripoli, and Roger of Salerno gave an oath of fealty to Baldwin. Baldwin also secured the direct royal control of eight important towns, including Nablus, Jaffa, Acre, Sidon and Tiberias. Modern historian Alan Murray argues that Albert of Aachen's words are evidence that Baldwin "carried out a major distribution of fiefs, granting out some lordships but retaining other towns and territories as domain lands" in 1118. Baldwin also reorganized the royal household, making Hugh Caulis constable, Pagan butler, and John the chamberlain.

Meanwhile, Eustace was still on his way to claim his crown. He had already travelled as far as the Apulia region in Southern Italy when he was informed of Baldwin's accession to the throne. The delegates tried to convince him to continue his journey, claiming that Baldwin's election was illegal, but Eustace preferred to return home.

Baldwin sent envoys to Toghtekin to argue against his making an alliance with Al-Afdal, but Toghtekin demanded all of Oultrejourdain in return for his neutrality, an offer Baldwin refused. So Baldwin got ready defend his newly acquired kingdom from the Muslims. Baldwin first hurried to the southern frontier to fight the Fatimids en route to Jaffa and urged Roger and Pons to send reinforcements from Antioch and County of Tripoli. After encountering each other, neither the Egyptians nor the Crusaders risked a pitched battle, and both armies stood in a standoff for three months before both retreated. Meanwhile, Toghtekin had his son Taj al-Muluk Buri launch an invasion against Joscelin's Principality of Galilee. After Joscelin fended off raids by Buri for three months, he joined his army with Baldwin's. Baldwin and Joscelin made a raid against Damascene territory in the autumn and then decided to fight the Burid army near Daraa. Buri halted the Crusaders on a hill, where the Crusaders entrenched and stood against Buri's assault until he was crushed.

A new threat for Baldwin arrived in the aftermath of the Damascene invasion. The local Bedouin tribes settled in the Transjordan region and started to raid trade caravans near the Yarmuk River. To stop these Bedouins, Joscelin attempted a daring night attack against one of their camps in the spring of 1119. William I of Bures and his brother Godfrey accompanied him. Joscelin divided his small army of 150 men to encircle the tribe's camp on the Yarmouk, making the Bures brothers the commanders of one of the corps. When they were approaching the Bedouins' camp, they were ambushed by the Bedouins. Joscelin's group got lost and stuck around the sandhills while the Bures brothers got surrounded. William escaped, but Godfrey died fighting and most of their retainers were captured. After the defeat, Joscelin went back to Baldwin's headquarters in Tiberias and told him what happened. Annoyed by the Bedouin tribes, Baldwin led an entire army against them. The Muslims panicked against the might of Jerusalem and started to negotiate with the Crusaders, returning the prisoners they had taken in the battle for permission to settle temporarily in Transjordan. Baldwin agreed to the deal.

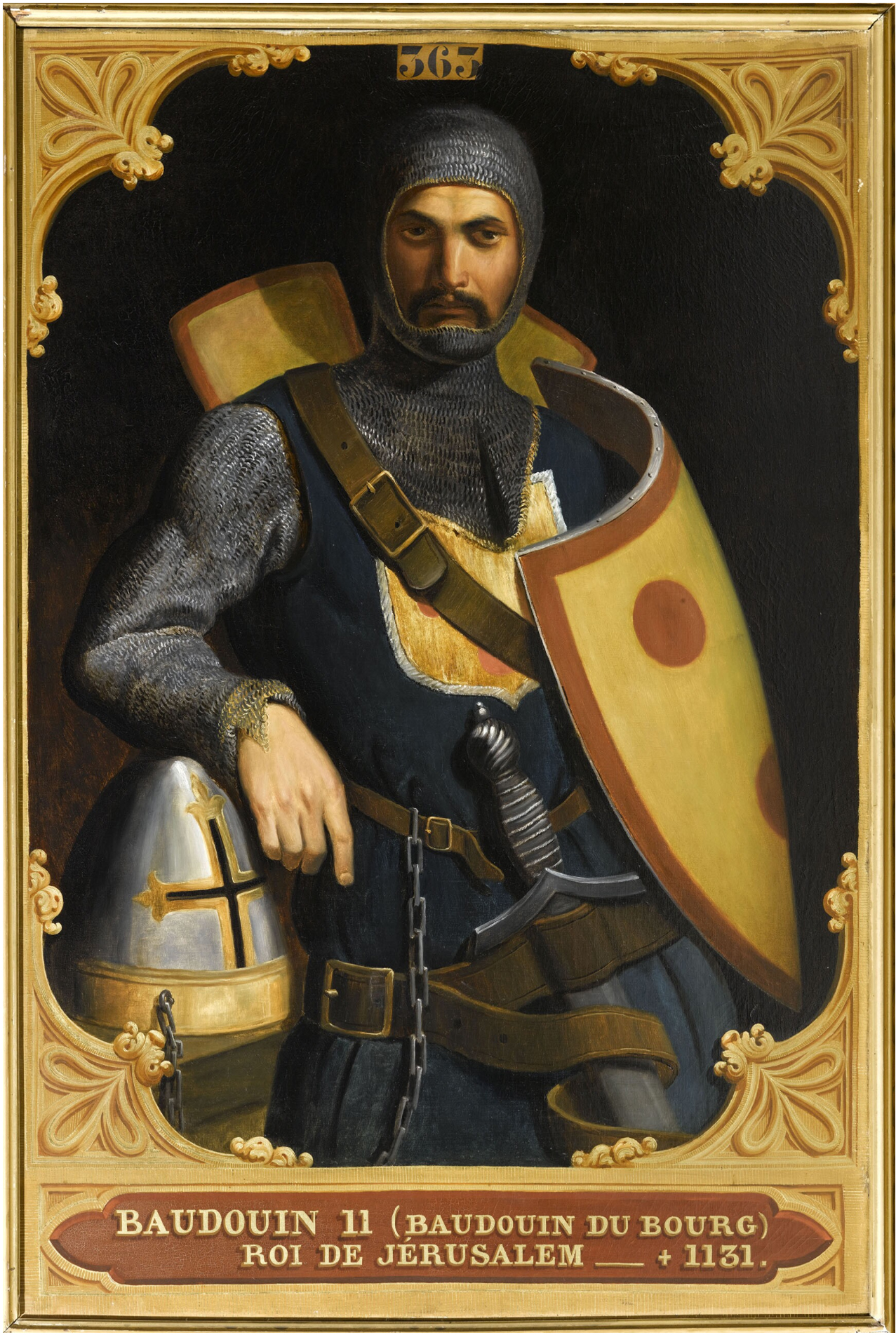
Baldwin II of Jerusalem

=== Battle of the Field of Blood ===
The death of the Seljuk Sultan Muhammad I Tapar in 1118 further quickened the decentralization of the Seljuk Empire into many more autonomous principalities. The administration under Mahmud II and Ahmad Sanjar focused mainly on their eastern territories in Khorasan which allowed more power and autonomy for the western territories. This often led to internal divisions, such as in Aleppo.

In 1117, Lu'lu' al-Yaya was assassinated, who had been the regent of Aleppo and protector to the minor Sultan Shah ibn Radwan. Sultan Shah's sister Amina Khatun then seized effective control of Aleppo. She did not proclaim herself as regent, but she called upon the commander Yaruqtash in Damascus to come and assume the regency in Aleppo on behalf of Sultan Shah. When Yaruqtash tried to assume direct control and depose Sultan Shah, she had him arrested and exiled. As this was going on, another crisis for Aleppo emerged. Their situation with the Crusaders was dire, as Roger of Salerno, regent of the Principality of Antioch for the still young Bohemond II, demanded a tax from Aleppo on each Muslim pilgrim going to Mecca, which pushed the Aleppan population to the limit. The qadi of the city, Ibn al-Khashshab, aware that Aleppo was under constant threat from the Crusaders, explained to the notables that the security of Aleppo was permanently compromised, hence he proposed that they entrust the city to a capable Turkish leader. So with her sister Farkhunda Khatun, Amina Khatun asked for Najm al-Din Ilghazi ibn Artuq of the Artuqid dynasty of Mardin to take over Aleppo. Ilghazi who already had control over Mardin and most of Upper Mesopotamia and was now happy to extend his control over Aleppo and northern Syria. Ilghazi advanced to take possession of the city during the summer of 1118 and married Farkhunda Khatun. Meanwhile, Sultan Shah went into exile. In 1118, Ilghazi took control of Mayyafiriqin and pacified the surrounding lands around Aleppo and in northern Syria.

As all this squabbling in Aleppo ensued, Roger sensed an opportunity to take Aleppo and to expand his influence over Syria and Mesopotamia. In 1118 Roger and Joscelin took Azaz. This left Aleppo open to attack from the Crusaders and created a serious threat to Ilghazi's hold on Syria. In response, Ilghazi gathered an army of Turks, Kurds, and Bedouins under his control. After he assembled his army, he created an alliance with Toghtekin and the Munquidites of Shaizar against the Crusaders.

Ilghazi's coalition started raiding Antioch and Edessa in May 1119. The Munquidites raided as far as Apamea. Meanwhile, Ilghazi led his army to raid the borderlands of the County of Edessa to discourage the local nobles there from helping Antioch. This worked due to Joscelin's absence from the region. Then Ilghazi moved his army to Qinnasrin to wait for Toghtekin's army to join him. However, due to the long distance between Damascus and Aleppo, Toghtekin's army could not arrive quickly enough.

When Roger heard of the Muslim invasion, he assembled his at Antioch, just like in his 1115 campaign where he defeated the Turks at Tell Danith. Roger marched out from Artah with Bernard of Valence, the Latin Patriarch of Antioch. Bernard suggested they remain there, as Artah was a well-defended fortress only a short distance away from Antioch, and Ilghazi would not be able to pass if they were stationed there. Bernard advised Roger to call for help from Baldwin, Pons, and Joscelin, adn Roger sent a plea of aid. The envoys met with Baldwin in Tiberias, because he had just concluded a short campaign against a Bedouin tribe in Transjordan. He gathered troops and departed for Antioch, taking a portion of the True Cross with him. But due to the distance between Baldwin's position and Roger's position, it took time for Baldwin's army to arrive. The campaign quickly devolved into a stalemate, with Roger waiting for Baldwin's army, while Ilghazi waited for Toghtekin's. Roger got impatient and was pressured by Antiochene nobles to move as they did not want anymore of their fiefs to be raided.

Despite the urging of Bernard, Roger decided that he would not wait any longer for reinforcements. He launched a counterattack against Ilghazi. Roger first led his army to the pass of Sarmada where he routed a Turcoman contingent of soldiers guarding it before encamping there. Roger constructed his camp on a hill overseeing the road. Roger's army was between 7,000 and 11,000. This army included 700 knights, 500 Armenian cavalry, 3,000 infantry, and the rest were Turcopoles and other auxiliaries.

Ilghazi's army was well-informed about the movement of the Crusaders, unlike the Turks in the Battle of Tell Danith campaign. Many Turkish spies entered the Crusader camp by dressing as local merchants. So when the Turks besieged the fort of al-Atharib, Ilghazi knew when Roger sent a force under Robert of Vieux-Pont set out to break the siege. So when Robert arrived at the scene, the Turks feigned a retreat, and Robert's men were drawn out from the fort and ambushed. On the night of 27 June, a frightening lunatic entered the Crusader camp. He laughed and shouted about the looming demise of the Crusader force, frightening the Crusaders, who believed in superstitions like these. As this was happening, Ilghazi was also waiting for reinforcements from Toghtekin, but he too was tired of waiting. Using little-used paths, his army quickly surrounded Roger's camp during the night of 27 June. Roger had recklessly chosen a campsite in a wooded valley with steep sides and few avenues of escape.

Roger's army were surprised to encounter the entire 20,000 strong Artuqid army surrounding their camp on three sides against the steep sides of the Sarmada valley when they woke up in the morning. Roger knew he was in a dire position as his camp was just a hastily built stockade which did not have any water or food source, making it inconvenient for siege defense. The Crusaders hastily formed into five divisions with Roger boldly telling his troops that he would like to go hunting. After holding a quick mass, the army drew up in a V-shaped line with the tip farthest from the Muslim battle array. From left to right, the divisions were commanded by Robert of St. Lo, Prince Roger, Guy de Frenelle, Geoffrey the Monk and Peter. Meanwhile, Roger held back a sixth division under Rainald I Masoir to protect the Antiochene rear. The left flank was made out of the Armenians and the Turcopoles. The center included the Crusader heavy infantry while the other divisions consisted of knights.

As the Muslim army waited, the qadi Abu al-Fadl ibn al-Khashshab, wearing his lawyer's turban but brandishing a lance, rode out in front of the troopers. At first they were incredulous at being harangued by a scholar, but at the end of his passionate evocation of the duties and merits of the jihad warrior, according to Kamal ad-Din (the contemporary historian of Aleppo) these hardened professionals wept with emotion and rode into battle.

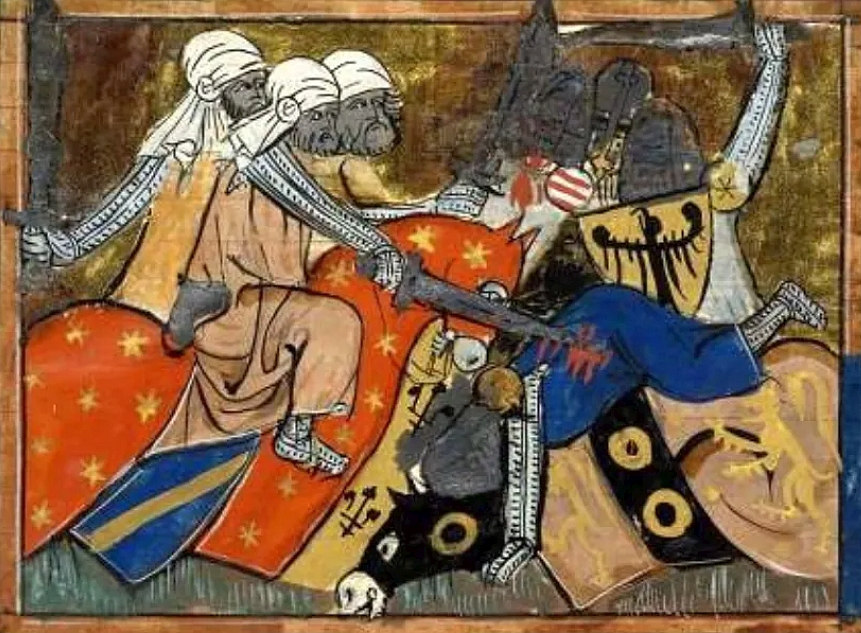
Battle of the Field of Blood

That morning, 28 June, the battle was begun by an archery duel between the Antiochene infantry, posted in front of the knights, and the first wave of Turkish horse archers testing the Crusader resolve and defences. Then battle was joined with the left and centers of the Crusader army fighting back the Artuqid army. The Crusader army was at first successful when the right-hand divisions of Peter and Geoffrey the Monk of knights attacked and pushed back the Artuqids opposed to them. Guy de Frenelle's center division had some success also, but the knights slowly lost their momentum and they slowly got pushed more and more back. The battle was soon decided on the left flank where the Turcopoles and Armenians were overrun by the Artuqids. At this point, the local simoom wind arrived, blowing a dust cloud into the faces of the Crusader army. The Artuqid right flank overran the Armenians and Turcopoles, and the left flank pushed back the Antiochene knights. The two flanks then enveloped the Crusaders. Roger tried to lead a counter charge in the center. Meanwhile, Rainald led a countercharge which broke the Artuqid encirclement. As he was chasing some Artuqids, he was seriously wounded and withdrew to Sarmada together with his few retainers. Roger was killed by a sword in the face at the foot of the great jewelled cross which had served as his standard. Hundreds of his soldiers died fighting, and most who survived the battle were taken prisoner. Ilghazi's army had just inflicted a major defeat, destroying the entire Principality of Antioch's army. Arab historian Ibn al-Qalanisi describes the victory as "one of the finest of victories, and such plenitude of divine aid was never granted to Islam in all its past ages."

After the battle, Ilghazi approached Sarmada where Rainald had fled. Ilghazi promised to release Rainald a month later if Rainald did not resist. After Ilghazi gave his ring to Rainald as a guarantee, Rainald surrendered the fortress without resistance.

=== Battle of Hab ===
The entire Principality of Antioch was left almost undefended as Ilghazi had just destroyed its entire army. Bernard was trying to muster any defence of the city of Antioch as he could. He had the people mount the walls and gather supplies for any attack. After the battle Ilghazi sent raiding parties to plunder the principality, some which went as far as to raid Port Saint Symeon and the outskirts of Antioch. However, the indecisive Artuqids under Ilghazi did not seize on the opportunity of Antioch's weakness and attack the city. Meanwhile, Ilghazi went on an alcoholic binge in celebration, and in his drunkenness he did not advance to Antioch. When Ibn al-Qalanisi describes the one "disgraceful habit" of Ilghazi, he states "Now when Ilghazi drank wine and it got the better of him, he habitually remained for several days in a state of intoxication, without recovering his senses sufficiently to take control or to be consulted on any matter or decision." "The failure of Il Ghazi to profit from his major victory ... was due not only to his own subsequent and prolonged drunkenness, but to the scattering of his forces in search of plunder." Before Ilghazi recovered from his binge and attacked Antioch, Baldwin's army arrived.

As soon as he heard the news of the defeat, Baldwin quickly marched north under the relic of the True Cross. On the way, he picked up a contingent from the County of Tripoli under Pons and another contingent from the County of Edessa under Joscelin. Ilghazi tried to prevent Baldwin, Pons, and Joscelin from reaching Antioch, but Baldwin entered the town without resistance. Pons, who arrived a day later from Baldwin, warded off an attack of Turcoman raiders. The leaders of the city acknowledged Baldwin as regent for the lawful prince, the ten-year old Bohemond, who was living in Southern Italy. Baldwin assembled the remnants of Antioch's army and joined them to his own army and then prepared for the an attack from Ilghazi. Baldwin distributed the estates of the noblemen who had perished in the Field of Blood among his retainers, mainly through giving the widows of the deceased lords to them in marriage. Baldwin then tried to make the people of Antioch feel safe by sending contingents of knights to drive out more waves of Turkic raiders if there were any. Baldwin placed Bernard at the head of the government.

Meanwhile, Ilghazi continued to celebrate his victory by killing all the Antiochene soldiers he had in captivity. Ilghazi knew that because of the loss of the Antiochene field army, all of Antioch's border towns east of the Orontes River could easily be taken. He was joined by Toghtekin's army, nearly doubling his army. Ilghazi and Toghtekin first attacked Atharib, whose lord was not present because he had answered Baldwin's call of all remaining Antiochene soldiers. Atharib surrendered at the sight of the Muslim army on the condition that all Christians were to be allowed to retreat to Antioch safely. The next city which fell was Zardana. Its lord, Robert the Leper also obeyed Baldwin's summons and left Zardana for Antioch. Ilghazi laid siege Zardana and captured it on 12 August. Sarmin, Ma'arrat al-Numan and Kafr Tab also rapidly fell into Muslim hands.

When he heard of the Turkish offensive, Baldwin knew he had to respond quickly. Baldwin marched toward Zardana, 65 kilometers east-southeast of Antioch. He knew it was besieged by Ilghazi, but he did not know it had fallen. While camped at the Tell Danith watering point, Baldwin found out that Zardana had fallen. Accordingly, the Crusaders prepared to retreat to the stronghold of Hab, c. 25 kilometers southwest of Zardana, in order to replenish their supplies.

On the morning of 14 August Baldwin arranged his army for retreat through open country. Leading the way were three squadrons of 700 knights. Behind them marched several thousand infantrymen, composed of bowmen and spearmen. Pons and his knights guarded the right flank. A body of Antiochene knights under Robert Fulcoy protected the left flank. More knights from Antioch guarded the rear. Baldwin led a reserve of mounted knights, but it is not clear in what part of the formation he marched. In the rear was another contingent of Antiochene infantry and cavalry led by Antiochene barons. The Crusader army encountered some Turkish horse archers who used their hit and run tactics against them. They were part of Ilghazi's vanguard, and they rained arrows on the Crusader column. Baldwin was experienced with these tactics, and he had his men to not leave their formation and to stay firm. Baldwin created a reserve contingent of knights.

Ilghazi and his Artuqids led the Muslim left flank. The first line consisted of Turkish horse archers while his second line consisted of infantrymen and Kurdish archers. Toghtekin and his Burids held the Muslim right flank with Turkish horse archers in the front and infantrymen in the back. The battle began with the Muslim horse archers charging the Crusader army, employing hit and run tactics and feigned retreats while they rained arrows, spears, and javelins on the Crusader army. The Turks hoped to provoke the Crusader cavalry into launching a premature charge or to open gaps in the enemy infantry formation. When such a favorable opportunity presented itself, they closed in to fight it out with lance and sword. The Crusader crossbowmen and archers responded in kind, firing at the Turks. Confident in victory due to his numbers, as soon as the Turkic ammunition stocks of arrows started to run out, the Turkish horsemen charged into close-quarter combat with the Crusaders. The Crusader right flank of Tripolitans at first faced the brunt of the Turkish charge, but Pons withstood the charge and fought back the Turks. However, the Tripolitans slowly got pushed back into the Crusader center.

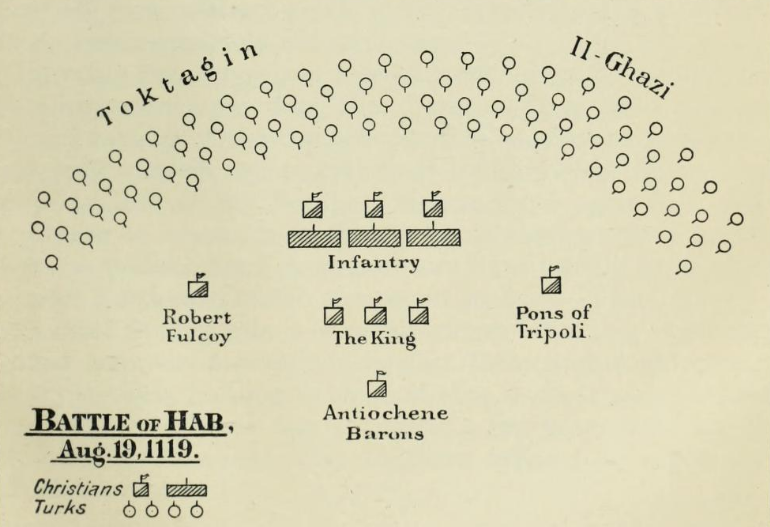
Order of Battle in the Battle of Hab

On the left flank, Robert the Leper and the Antiochene knights easily charged and routed the Burid cavalry and footmen. But instead of outflanking the Muslims, he pursued the Turks in an attempt to retake his stronghold of Zardana. At first he successfully chased the Turks. But as he got closer to Zardana, the Turks were able to regroup, turn back, and ambush Robert's force with the garrison of Zardana. Robert fell off his horse and was captured by Ilghazi's troops. But in the battle, the Artuqids and Burids were so occupied fighting Rober that they failed to outflank the Crusader army, which basically lost their left flank due to Robert's pursuit. Baldwin noticed this and prepared a counterattack. In the melee in the Crusader center, the knights were doing most of the hard work fighting the Turks, and the infantrymen were fresh and had not seen much combat yet. Baldwin had the infantrymen launch a counterattack there, which pushed back Ilghazi's men. Then Baldwin used the reserve knights to go through the gap made by the absence of Robert's men and the Turks he was chasing, to go around to the rear of the Artuqid army. When the knights reached that position they charged the Muslims from behind, surrounding and routing much of the Turkish center, from where they aided the Tripolitan flank. At this point, Ilghazi and his army retreated from the battle.

In Baldwin's narrow tactical victory, the Crusaders suffered serious losses. It may be surmised that the Turkish army also took painful losses, since Ilghazi withdrew his men from the fight, though he claimed victory nevertheless. Strategically, it was a Christian victory which preserved the Principality of Antioch for several generations. According to Walter the Chancellor, the Crusaders routed the Muslims, but Matthew of Edessa states "neither side was defeated nor was victorious".

As Baldwin claimed victory and returned to Antioch, he retook Sarmin and Kafartab. Then Baldwin went to retake Al-Rusafa and Ma'arrat al-Numan. Both cities surrendered, and Baldwin recovered every stronghold taken by Ilghazi after the Battle of Ager Sanguinis except for Atharib and Zardana. One historian notes "without opposition, Baldwin was able to recapture some of the places lost." However, after the battle, Toghtekin and Ilghazi returned to Aleppo claiming victory too because of the many prisoners they took, especially Robert the Leper and his men. But they also needed funds. Robert was taken to Damascus where he offered 10,000 dinars as ransom to Toghtekin. However, he refused to convert to Islam for which Toghtekin beheaded him. His skull was decorated with jewels, and Toghtekin used it as a drinking cup. Robert's sons William of Zardana and Garenton of Saone inherited his estates. Robert's descendants possessed Saone until it was captured by Saladin in 1188.

Baldwin returned to Antioch and granted the County of Edessa to Joscelin, stabilizing the county. When Baldwin left, it became accepted that he would remain regent for Antioch while Bernard would hold power over the principality and most of its affairs.

=== Council of Nablus ===
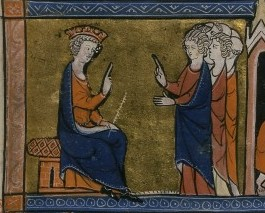
Baldwin presiding at a council

Baldwin and his wife Morphia of Melitene were crowned king and queen in Bethlehem on Christmas Day 1119. Before 15 January 1120, the king granted Joscelin's former Principality of Galilee to William I of Bures, who thus seized one of the largest fiefs in the kingdom. Baldwin put his efforts to making a law code for the kingdom. Ever since the founding of the Kingdom of Jerusalem, there was no official and solidified set of laws for the kingdom. The Crusaders soon realized that if they wanted to govern their kingdom effectively, with its majority Muslim populace and with their constant warfare with their Muslim neighbors, they needed a law code. So Baldwin and the Warmund, Patriarch of Jerusalem held a general assembly at the Council of Nablus on 16 January, calling all of the secular and clerical figures of the Kingdom to meet at Nablus.It established 25 canons dealing with both religious and secular affairs. It was not quite a church council, but not quite a meeting of the royal court; according to German historian Hans Mayer, due to the religious nature of many of the canons, it can be considered both a parlement and an ecclesiastical synod. The resulting agreement between the patriarch and the king was a concordat, similar to the Concordat of Worms two years later.

The council established the first written laws for the kingdom. The canons begin with the reasons for calling the council: Jerusalem had been plagued with locusts and mice for the past four years, and the Crusader states in general were suffering from repeated attacks from the Muslims. It was believed that the sins of the people needed to be corrected before Jerusalem could prosper.

Canons 1-3 deal with tithes to the church. Canon 1 is a promise by King Baldwin to surrender the appropriate tithes to the patriarch, namely those from his own royal estates in Jerusalem, Nablus and Acre. In canon 2 Baldwin seeks forgiveness for the tithes he had previously withheld, and Warmund absolves him of this sin in canon 3. This shows that the church was able to assert its rights in the Crusader kingdom, a victory in the Investiture Conflict in Europe. The prelates and noblemen who attended the meeting confirmed the clergy's right to collect the tithe and to bear arms "in the cause of defense".

Canons 4-7 deal with adultery. Canon 4 outlines punishments for a man who is suspected of committing adultery with the wife of another man; first, he is to be forbidden from visiting the woman, and if he visits her again, he is to come before the church and be subjected to the ordeal of hot iron to prove his innocence. If he is proven to have committed adultery, canon 5 decrees that the "eviretur" punishment should be enacted and then he should be exiled. The punishment for the adulterous woman is mutilation of the nose, a familiar Byzantine punishment, unless her husband takes pity on her, in which case they should both be exiled. Canon 6 deals with a similar situation for clerics: if a man suspects a cleric from visiting his wife, the cleric should firstly be forbidden from visiting her; a second offense should be pointed out to a church magistrate, and a third offense will result in the deordination of the cleric. He will then be subject to the same punishments described in canon 5. Canon 7 forbids a pimp or a prostitute from "corrupting a wife with words" and causing her to become an adulterer. The punishments in canon 5 apply here as well.

Canons 8-11 establish punishments for sodomy, the first appearance of such punishments in medieval law. According to canon 8, an adult sodomite, "tam faciens quam paciens" (both the active and the passive parties), should be burned at the stake. If, however, the passive party is a child or an elderly person, canon 9 says that only the active party should be burned, and it will suffice that the passive party repent, as he is presumed to have sinned against his will. If the sodomy is against his will but he keeps it hidden for whatever reason, canon 10 says that he too will be judged as a sodomite. Canon 11 allows for a sodomite to repent and avoid punishment, but if he is found to have participated in sodomy a second time, he will be allowed to repent again but will be exiled from the kingdom.

Canons 12-15 pertain to sexual relations with Muslims, an important question in the Kingdom, where Muslims far outnumbered their Latin overlords. Canon 12 states that a man who willingly has sexual relations with a Muslim woman should be castrated, and she should have her nose mutilated. If a man rapes his own female Muslim slave, according to canon 13 she should be confiscated by the state, and he should be castrated. If he rapes another man's female Muslim slave, canon 14 says that he should be subjected to the punishment for adulterers stated in canon 5, castration. Canon 15 deals with the same subject for Christian women - if a Christian woman willingly has sexual relations with a Muslim man, they should both be subjected to the punishment for adulterers, but if she was raped, then she will not be held accountable, and the Muslim will be castrated.

Canon 16 prohibits Muslims from dressing like Christians. This canon foreshadows the similar canon 68 of the Fourth Lateran Council almost one hundred years later in 1215, which would prohibit both Jews and Muslims from adopting Christian dress. Similar laws were promulgated in Spain, where Christians, Jews, and Muslims similarly intermingled.

Canons 17-19 deal with bigamy, another important subject, as many crusaders had abandoned their families in Europe. If a man takes a second wife, he should do penance until the first Sunday of Lent, but if he hides his crime and is discovered, his property should be confiscated, and he should be exiled. Canon 18 allows for bigamy to go unpunished if a man or woman unknowingly marries someone who is already married, as long as they can prove their ignorance. If a man has taken a second wife and wishes to divorce her, canon 19 states that he must prove that he is already married, either by the ordeal of hot iron, or by bringing witnesses to swear for him.

Canons 20-21 deal with clerics. Canon 20 says a cleric should not be held guilty if he takes up arms in self-defense, but he cannot take up arms for any other reason nor can he act like a knight. This was an important concern for the Crusader states; clerics were generally forbidden from participating in warfare in European law, but the Crusaders needed all the manpower they could find, and only one year before, Antioch had been defended by the patriarch following the Battle of Ager Sanguinis, one of the calamities referred to in the introduction to the canons. Canon 21 says that a monk or canon regular who apostatizes should either return to his order or go into exile. Canon 22 simply forbids false accusations.

Canons 23-25 focused on theft. Canon 23 says that anyone convicted of stealing property worth more than one bezant should have either a hand or foot cut off, or an eye removed. If the property was worth less than one bezant, he should be branded on the face and publicly whipped. The stolen goods should be returned, but if they are no longer in the thief's possession, the thief himself becomes the property of his victim. If the thief is caught stealing again, he should either have his other hand, foot, or eye removed, or he should be killed. If the thief was underage, canon 24 says he should be kept in custody and then sent to the royal court, but no further punishment is outlined. Canon 25 states that these punishments also do not apply to the barons, who should be subject only to the judgement of the royal court.

The Council of Nablus marks the recognition of military orders in the Crusader states for the first time. With all the constant warfare between the Crusaders and Muslims, the pilgrims were in danger, and military orders were important in their protection. A confraternity of knights established by Hugh of Payns and Godfrey de Saint-Omer to protect pilgrims in the Holy Land most probably received official recognition at the council, according to historians Malcolm Barber and Christopher Tyerman. Baldwin temporarily lodged the knights in the royal palace on the Temple Mount and they became known as the Knights Templar. He offered Nabi Samwil to the Cistercians, but Bernard of Clairvaux ceded the place to the Premonstratensians who built a monastery. After the council, orders like the Knights Hospitaller and the Knights Templar were recognized by all of the Crusader states, and their operations extended throughout the Outremer. Baldwin and Warmund charged the orders with the duty of keeping the roads safe from thieves and others who were routinely robbing and killing pilgrims en route to Jerusalem.

== Venetian Crusade ==
=== Call for Crusade ===
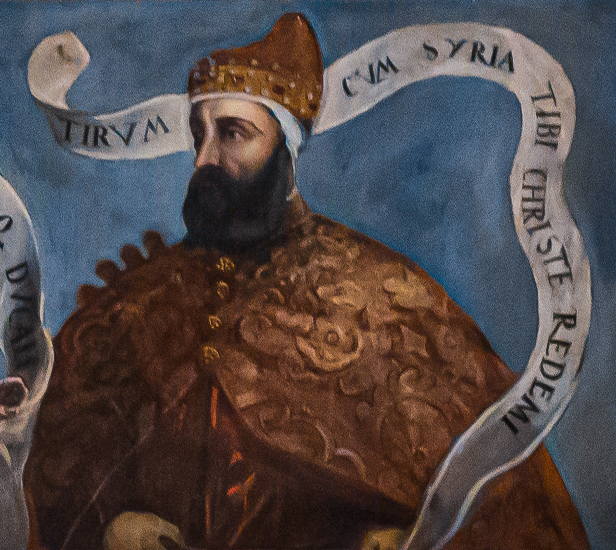
Domenico Michiel, Doge of Venice

Shortly after the council, Baldwin and Warmund sent letters to Pope Callixtus II, urging him to call a crusade to support the defense of the Holy Land. They both realized that in the recent campaigns, the Crusaders were seriously weakened, especially due to the destruction of the entire Principality of Antioch's army at the Battle of Ager Sanguinis. So in order to fight off the constant Muslim attacks on the Outremer, they would need outside help. This fact especially became true when Ilghazi launched a new invasion of the Outremer. At the time, Pope Callixtus was distracted in matters other than a crusade. He was busy fighting the Holy Roman Emperor, Henry V in the Investiture Controversy. However, the pope was eager to bring Catholic Europe's attention elsewhere, like in a crusade, which was conveniently being asked for by Baldwin. The only nation interested in helping the Crusader cause was the Republic of Venice. The Venetians desired more trading posts and privileges from the Crusaders in the Levant. The Venetians were also embroiled in a trade war against John II Komnenos, the economically and militarily powerful emperor of the Byzantine Empire.

After his accession to the throne, John II Komnenos had refused to confirm the Byzantine–Venetian treaty of 1082 with the Republic of Venice, which had given Venice unique and generous trading rights within the empire. Yet the change in policy was not motivated by financial concerns. An incident involving the abuse of a member of the imperial family by Venetians led to a dangerous conflict, especially as Constantinople had depended on Venice for its naval strength. After a Byzantine retaliatory attack on Kerkyra, John exiled the Venetian merchants from Constantinople. The Venetians were eager to get back at the Byzantines, and they thought the voyage east might be the perfect opportunity to do so. The pope forwarded the request to Venice.

A crusade was announced in 1122 with its goal of aiding the Kingdom of Jerusalem. Soon knights and pilgrims from France, Germany, Italy, Bohemia, and other nations in Catholic Europe gathered in Venice. The terms of the crusade were agreed through negotiations between the envoys of Baldwin II and the Doge of Venice, Domenico Michiel. Once the Venetians decided to participate, Callixtus sent them his papal banner to signify his approval. At the First Council of the Lateran he confirmed that the Venetians had Crusader privileges, including remission of their sins. The church also extended its protection to the families and property of the Crusaders. After final preparations were completed on 8 August, Michiel launched the seaborne crusade. The Venetian fleet of more than 120 ships carrying over 15,000 men left the Venetian Lagoon on 8 August. This seems to have been the first crusade in which the knights brought their horses with them. The fleet sailed under the flag of St. Peter, which the pope had sent to Michiel.

As the Venetian fleet sailed through the Adriatic Sea and approached the Ionian Sea, the Venetians decided to use this opportunity to attack the Eastern Roman Empire, with whom they were still in a trade war. The Venetians invested Corfu. However, this siege continued for more than a year, and the Crusaders got restless about sailing to the Holy Land. As the siege dragged on, a letter came to the Venetians from the Crusader states, urging them to continue their voyage to the Levant as new events which required their attention and which made the need for the Outremer to get aid from the Venetians even more.

=== Skirmishes in the Holy Land ===
Ilghazi and his nephew Belek Ghazi invaded Edessa and Antioch in May 1120. Ilghazi managed to take Nisibin, and then he pillaged the County of Edessa before turning north towards Armenia. But Bernard and Joscelin decided not to risk another campaign against Ilghazi and stayed within their respective fortified cities and just attacked the Turkish supply lines. Since the campaigns of the Battle of Ager Sanguinis and the Battle of Hab, most of Edessa and Antioch were still devastated and had almost no loot in the countryside. So the Muslims had no loot or plunder, diminishing the Turkish enthusiasm for this campaign and prompting many to desert. Being responsible for the defense of the northern crusader states, Baldwin decided to again lead his troops to Antioch, but a significant group of the Jerusalemite noblemen and clergy opposed the expedition. Warmund refused to accompany the royal army and after lengthy negotiations allowed Baldwin to take the True Cross with him. Baldwin and his army reached Antioch in June. When the Artuqids heard about Baldwin's approach, their morale declined further. Ilghazi agreed to a one-year truce, which secured the possession of Kafartab and two other fortresses for the Crusaders.

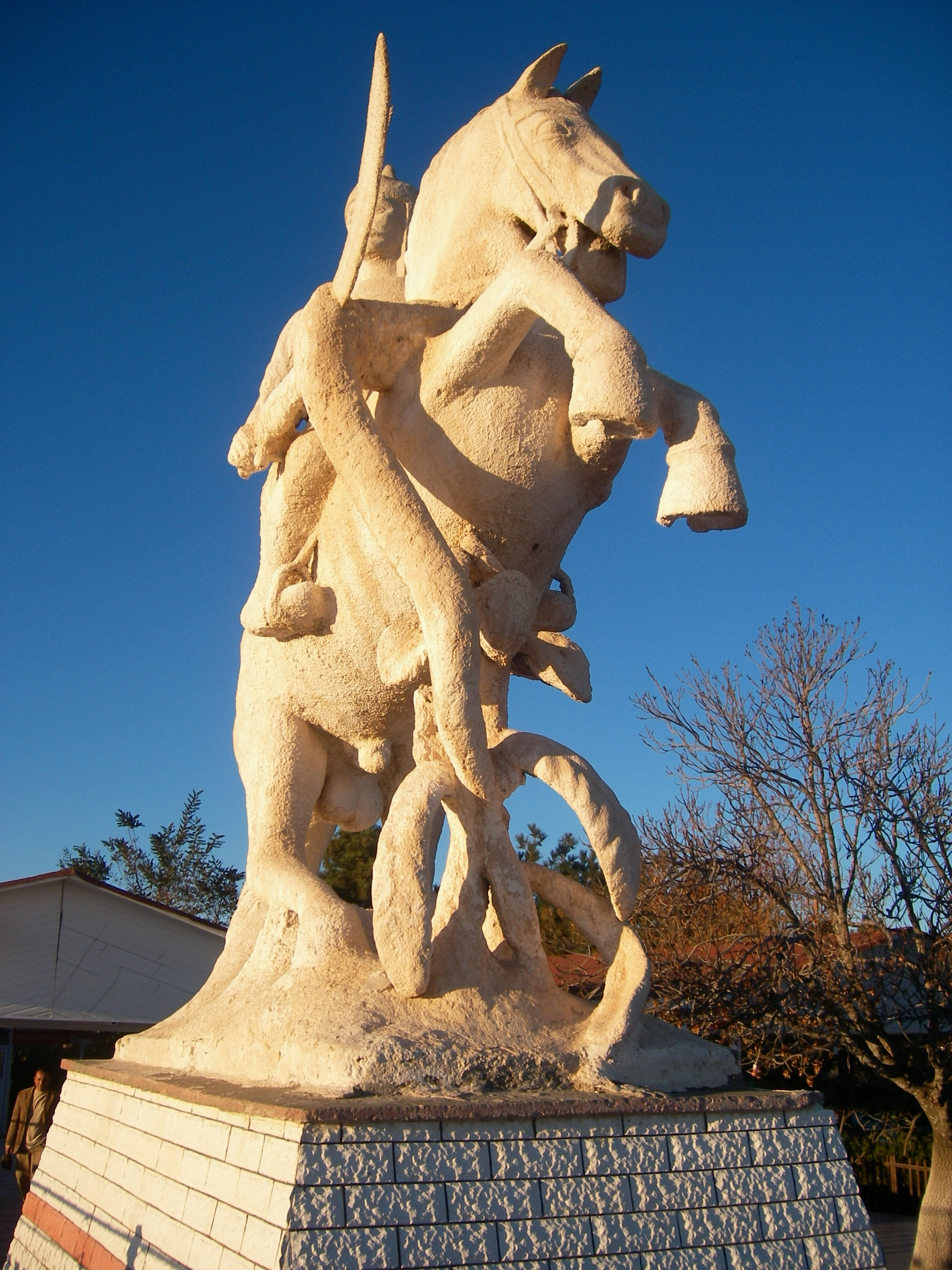
Belek Ghazi of the Artuqids

Baldwin returned to Jerusalem in early 1121, after Toghtekin made a raid against Galilee. In July, he invaded Damascene territory and destroyed a fortress that Toghtekin had recently erected near Jerash. Following the signing of the truce—with supposedly up to 250,000–350,000 troops, including men led by his son-in-law Sadaqah and Sultan Malik of Ganja—Ilghazi invaded Georgia. Joined by the Seljuk prince Toghrul Arslan, he met David IV of Georgia met him at the Battle of Didgori where he was decisively defeated. Matthew of Edessa claims a dubious number of 400,000 Turks were killed. Among the various leaders, only Ilghazi and his son-in-law Dubays ibn Sadaqa escaped.

Taking advantage of Ilghazi's weakness, Baldwin launched a military campaign across the Orontes. In November this forced Ilghazi's son Suleiman to hand over to the Crusaders Zardana, Atharib and other forts that Ilghazi had captured the previous year. After this deal, the Crusaders had regained every fortress Ilghazi took from Antioch since the Battle of Ager Sanguinis. This deal proved to be a heavy blow for the Artuqids. Ilghazi was tired of putting down internal decisions so he decided to divide his empire between all of his successors. Belek Ghazi succeeded him in Aleppo and in all of northern Syria, Husam al-Din Timurtash succeeded him in Mardin and in Upper Mesopotamia, while his brother Shams al-Dawla Suleiman became ruler of Mayyafariqin and of northern Kurdistan.

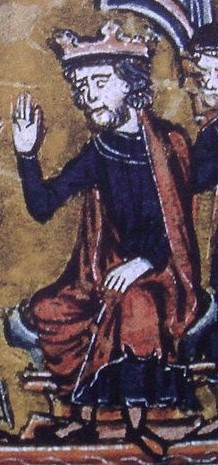
Baldwin II of Jerusalem

The only man who opposed the Council of Nablus was Pons of Tripoli. The fact of Baldwin's acquisition of Antioch as regent which made him the most powerful monarch of the Crusader states which annoyed Pons. Neither Pons nor the bishops of his county attended the synod at Nablus, although all prelates and secular lords of the Kingdom of Jerusalem were present at the assembly. He openly refused obedience to the king in early 1122. Baldwin mustered his army and marched towards Tripoli, taking the True Cross with him. According to Fulcher of Chartres' report, to avoid an armed conflict, the two rulers' vassals mediated a reconciliation.

Ilghazi and Belek Ghazi laid siege to Zardana in June in an attempt to recapture the cities Suleiman surrendered to the Crusaders. King Baldwin II of Jerusalem was in Tripoli enforcing the rule of Pons, Count of Tripoli. When Baldwin heard of the invasion, he rode out with a relief force. The threat of Baldwin and Joscelin forced Ilghazi to lift the siege in July and the campaign ended due to Ighazi falling ill. Belek led his army back home through the territory of the County of Edessa. The previous victorious engagement emboldened Joscelin, who decided to press his advantage by attacking Belek, starting by securing a crossing of the Euphrates at Barbalissos. Like in his previous raid against the Bedouins in Transjordan, he took only a few hundred men with him in a swift attack. However just like his raid against the Bedouins, he was discovered, and Belek Ghazi ambushed a captured Joscelin along with Waleran of Le Puiset near Saruj on 13 September. Belek imprisoned both lords in Kharput, a fortress in southern Armenia. Ilghazi reoccupied Atharib, but he died on 3 November. Baldwin, who was still in Antioch, persuaded Badr ad-Daulah Suleiman, the new ruler of Aleppo, to restore Atharib to the Crusaders on 2 April 1123. Baldwin recaptured Birejik and made Geoffrey, Lord of Marash, regent of Edessa.

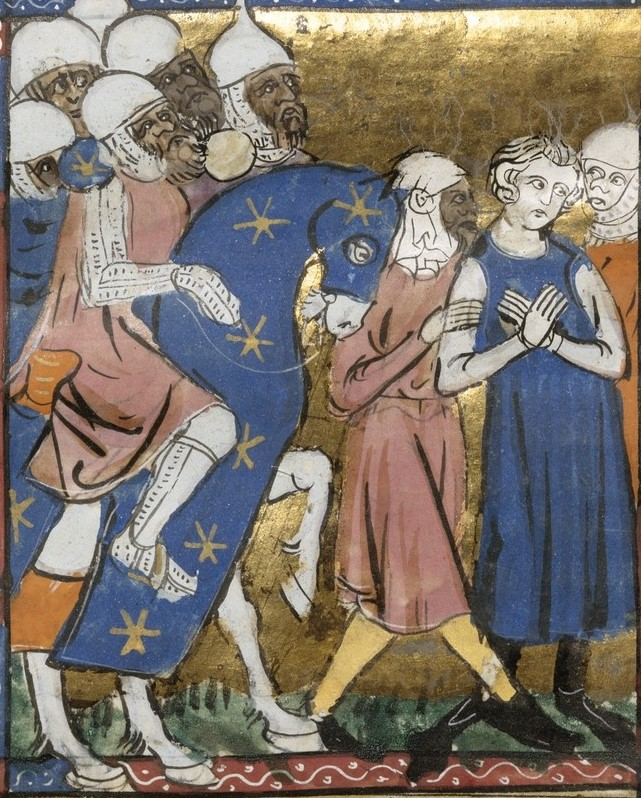
Capture of Baldwin II

Baldwin made a raid towards Kharput in an attempt to save Joscelin and Waleran, but he stopped near Gargar. While Baldwin was preparing to practice falconry on the morning of 18 April, Belek Ghazi attacked his camp and captured him. Baldwin was taken to Kharput. With the count and king captured, the Crusaders desperately needed aid and assistance against the Muslims in this crisis. These two victories gained Belek Ghazi fame both in Muslim countries and in Europe.

While Belek was away in Aleppo in June, Joscelin's 50 Armenian supporters came to Kharput, disguising themselves as monks, and expelled the Turkish garrison from the fortress. Joscelin left Kharput to gather troops in Turbessel and Antioch, but Baldwin and the Armenian soldiers remained in the fortress to defend it against Belek. Joscelin went to Antioch where he attempted to gain reinforcements to help Baldwin in Kharput. Joscelin tried to get Bernard's permission multiple times for an army but failed in all of them. Joscelin then left for Jerusalem to get aid.

The contemporaneous Galbert of Bruges records that delegates came to Flanders from Jerusalem during Baldwin's captivity. They stated that Baldwin "was grasping and penurious and had not governed the people of God well". They offered the crown to Charles the Good, the Count of Flanders. Galbert's report shows that a faction of the Jerusalemite nobility attempted to dethrone the captive Baldwin. Being the head of the lineage from which the first two rulers of Jerusalem were descended, and also the overlord of their brother, Eustace, Charles the Good was an ideal candidate for the throne. However, he refused the offer. Murray tentatively associates the leader of the discontented noblemen with the Flemish Eustace Grenier.

On learning of Baldwin's captivity, Warmund convoked the prelates and barons to an assembly in Acre which elected Eustace Grenier Constable of Jerusalem and bailiff (or regent) of Jerusalem. Then Baldwin took possession of the fortress of Kharpurt where he had been held in captivity. Eustace sent reinforcements to Kharpurt to assist the king, but Balak ibn Bahram recaptured the fortress by the time the Crusader troops reached it.

When the Fatimids heard of the predicament of the Kingdom of Jerusalem, they decided to launch an invasion of the kingdom. In 1123, the new vizier of the Fatimid Caliphate, al-Ma'mun al-Bata'ihi, organized a major invasion of Crusader lands. The Fatimids planned to capture the coastal city of Jaffa. In this era, the Egyptian armies usually deployed with Nubian archers on foot, supported by dense formations of Arab and Berber light cavalry. This relatively immobile array provided the Crusader heavy cavalry with an ideal target.

On 29 May at the Battle of Yibneh, the Fatimid invasion force encountered the Crusader army of knights and men-at-arms on horseback and spearmen and bowmen on foot under Eustace Grenier. The fighting lasted only a short time as the Egyptian host was unable to withstand the shock of the Crusader cavalry charges. As Fulcher of Chartres says,

this battle did not last long because when our foes saw our armed men (meaning the mounted knights and men-at-arms) advance in excellent order against them their horsemen immediately took flight as if completely bewitched, going into a panic instead of using good sense. Their foot-soldiers were massacred.

The defeat was decisive. Except for continued raids from Ascalon until the Siege of Ascalon in 1153, the Fatimids ceased to be a threat to the Crusader states until the rise of Saladin in 1169. Eustace easily won the Battle of Yibneh on 29 May. He did not long survive his victory, because he died on 15 June 1123. He was buried in the Church of Saint Mary of the Latins. According to William of Tyre he was "a wise and prudent man, with great experience in military matters". After Grenier died on 15 June, William I of Bures succeeded him as regent. The bailiffs and the patriarch closely cooperated with each other and other high-ranking officials in administering the kingdom during Baldwin's captivity.

=== Pactum Warmundi ===
When the Venetians heard the news that Baldwin had been captured and that the Kingdom of Jerusalem had subsequently been invaded, they ended their siege of Corfu and sailed for the Holy Land. Soon the Venetian fleet arrived at Acre. After arriving, Michiel completed a pilgrimage to Jerusalem, where he celebrated Christmas of 1123, and met with Warmund and the Constable William I of Bures, governing Jerusalem in place of Baldwin. After the celebrations, the Crusaders entered into debate where they should direct the Venetian fleet and their 15,000 Crusaders reinforcements. The Crusaders knew that the fleet would be essential in taking one of the last two Muslim ports on the Levantine coast. The barons from the south of the kingdom wanted to attack Ascalon, while those in the north preferred to direct the fleet against Tyre, which was larger and wealthier and a valuable port for its sovereign, the ruler of Damascus. According to William of Tyre, "The matter came near resulting in a dangerous quarrel." The Venetians, who preferred Tyre's harbor than Ascalon's for trade, chose Tyre as the goal for the Crusade.

A treaty of alliance was established between Jerusalem and the Venetians prior to the beginning of the siege of Tyre in February 1124 (the city capitulated to the Crusaders later that year). The treaty was negotiated by Warmund, and thus it is known as the Pactum Warmundi (Warmundus being the Latin form of his name). Earlier treaties had been negotiated between Jerusalem and the Venetians and other Italian city-states, and the Venetians had been granted privileges in 1100 and 1110 in return for military assistance, but this treaty was far more extensive. The Pactum granted the Venetians their own church, street, square, baths, market, scales, mill, and oven in every city controlled by the king of Jerusalem, except within Jerusalem, where their autonomy was more limited. In the other cities, they were permitted to use their own Venetian scales to conduct business and trade when trading with other Venetians, but otherwise they were to use the scales and prices established by the king. In Acre, they were granted a quarter of the city, where every Venetian "may be as free as in Venice itself." In Tyre and Ascalon (though neither had yet been captured), they were granted one-third of the city and one-third of the surrounding countryside, possibly as many as 21 villages in the case of Tyre. These privileges were free from taxation, but Venetian ships would be taxed if they were carrying pilgrims, and in this case the king would personally be entitled to one-third of the tax. For their help in the siege of Tyre, the Venetians were entitled to 300 "Saracen besants" per year from the revenue of that city. They were permitted to use their own laws in civil suits between Venetians or in cases in which a Venetian was the defendant, but if a Venetian was the plaintiff the matter would be decided in the courts of the kingdom. If a Venetian was shipwrecked or died in the kingdom, his property would be sent back to Venice rather than being confiscated by the king. Anyone living in the Venetian quarter in Acre or the Venetian districts in other cities would be subject to Venetian law.

The Pactum was signed by Patriarch Warmund; Evremar, Archbishop of Caesarea; Bernard, Bishop of Nazareth; Aschetinus, Bishop of Bethlehem; Roger, Bishop of Lydda; Guildin, abbot of St. Mary of Josaphat; Gerard, prior of the Holy Sepulchre; Aicard, prior of the Templum Domini; Arnold, Prior of Mount Sion; William Buris; and the chancellor, Pagan. Aside from William and Pagan, no secular authorities witnessed the treaty, perhaps indicating that the Venetians considered Jerusalem a papal fief. In summary, the Crusaders agreed to the so-called Pactum Warmundi—with Domenico Michiel, the Doge of Venice, offering commercial privileges to the Venetians in return for their military assistance against the Egyptian towns on the coast.

=== Siege of Tyre ===
The Crusaders and the Venetians laid siege to Tyre on 16 February 1124. Warmund was acknowledged as the supreme commander of the army. The Jerusalemite nobles sent envoys to Pons, urging him to join the siege. Pons hurried to the town, accompanied by a large retinue, damaging the self-confidence of the town's defenders, according to William of Tyre. Although Fulcher of Chartres and William of Tyre emphasize that Pons "remained always obedient" to Warmund and other Jerusalemite lords during the siege, their narration is actually evidence that Pons was regarded as one of the supreme commanders of the Christian army.

Ever since Baldwin I of Jerusalem’s Siege of Tyre, the rulers of the city, the Fatimid Caliphate, found it difficult to defend and govern the city, so they sold Tyre to Toghtekin, who installed a garrison there. However, the city still maintained prayers to the Fatimid Caliph al-Amir bi-Ahkam Allah which, in Muslim tradition, meant that the city formally still belonged to him. This delicate state of affairs meant that both powers had a claim to the city, but Al-Amir decided to break it. In spring 1122, Al-Amir's Fatimid fleet managed to recover control of Tyre. However this meant that both powers would try to defend the city if it were to be besieged. But the Fatimids and the Burids refused to work with each other due to Al-Amir's assertive and aggressive actions.

However they both were still a threat. The Fatimid navy was strong and still a force to be reckoned with in the region and could provide relief and supplies to the defenders of Tyre. With the over 70 galley fleet the Fatimids were preparing, they also began amassing an army to relieve the city from land. Meanwhile, Toghtekin could still be counted on to march to Tyre with a relief army to drive off the Crusaders too, just what happened in the previous siege of 1111–1112.

==== Battle of Jaffa ====
The Fatimid army started marching from Ascalon to Jaffa. William I of Bures quickly assembled an army of knights and militia to meet the threat, bringing a part of the True Cross with him. William met the Fatimids near Yibna (or Yibneh), where he blockaded the path in an attempt to stop the Fatimid march. This gave enough time for the Venetian fleet to leave the port of Jaffa before the Fatimid army, and the over 70 galley fleet of the Fatimids reached the city to attack their ships. Near Yibna, another battle ensued. Even though the Fatimids had more men, William's army routed the Egyptians, probably encouraged by the presence of the True Cross. When the Fatimid fleet heard about the defeat, they turned back to Ascalon.

In their second attempt to relieve Tyre, the Fatimids made a change of plan. Instead of having the army march for Jaffa, they decided to divert the force to Jerusalem instead. The navy would again attempt to sail to Tyre to relieve the city. However, the Egyptian fleet moved to its destination slowly, due to the many transport ships with them. The Venetian fleet was informed about a Fatimid fleet of around 100 sailing towards Tyre in order to relieve the defenders of the city. Thus the Venetian fleet sailed south in order to meet it, and Michiel ordered the division of the fleet into two parts with the weaker force at the helm and the stronger one hiding behind it. He did this with the intent to divert the fleet off Tyre and engage the fleet in battle.

As the Egyptians sailed to Tyre, they noticed the small squadron of Venetian ships. The Egyptians paused their voyage to engage them, assuming an easy victory. As they were about to engage, the Fatimids noticed a far larger squadron of Venetian ships approaching behind the smaller squadron. Realizing they were outnumbered, fear and panic spread throughout the Fatimid fleet. The Fatimids got caught between two Venetian squadrons, and soon their flagship was boarded by the Venetians. and their admiral was killed. The Fatimid sailors lost 4,000 men along with their admiral and 9 ships. The Venetians captured 10 merchant vessels en route back to Acre. Both Fulcher of Chartres (Book III/20) and William of Tyre record the event.

On this the other ships followed in haste and fell almost all the other enemy ships around. A fierce battle commenced, both sides fought with great bitterness, and there were so many killed, that those who were there, most emphatically assure you as unlikely as it may sound, that the victors waded in the enemy's blood and the surrounding sea was dyed red from the blood that flowed down from the ships, up to a radius of two thousand steps. But the shores, they say, were so thickly covered with the corpses that were ejected from the sea, that the air was tainted and the surrounding region contracted a plague. At lengths the fight continued man against man, and most heatedly one side was trying to advance while the other side tried to resist. Finally, however, the Venetians were with God's help victorious

– William of Tyre, Book XII / 22-23

==== Fall of Tyre ====
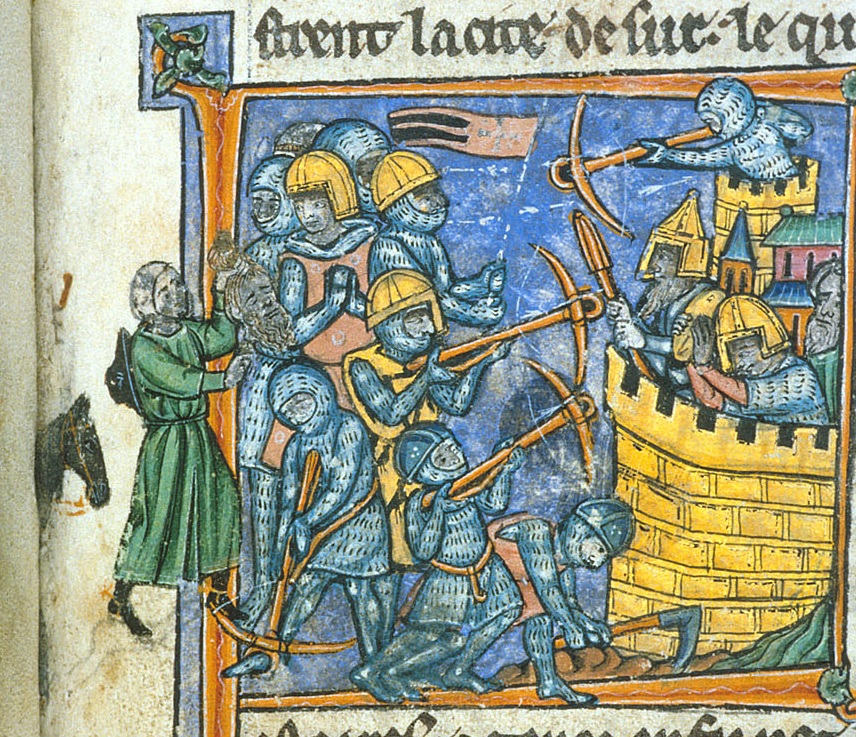
Illustration from the Estoire d'Eracles (British Library, Yates Thompson MS 12, dating to 1232–1261) showing the siege of Manbij (1124). Belek Ghazi's head is being brandished by the besiegers.

After the end of the Battle of Jaffa, Tyre found itself in a naval blockade by the Venetian fleet. They no longer could get supplies from the Fatimid fleet, had been destroyed. Food began to dwindle. The Tyrians again sent pleas for aid to Al-Amir and Toghtekin. The Tyrians stated that if no aid and supplies came soon, they would have to surrender. However, with Tyre cut off and in danger of falling to the Crusaders, and with their navy and army in shambles due to the Crusader victories, the Fatimids had to accept renewed Turkish control and left Tyre's hopes with Toghtekin. The Tyrians then asked for aid from Belek Ghazi.

As mentioned before, Joscelin left Kharput to go get aid to rescue Baldwin. He first went to Antioch, but failed, so he went to Jerusalem in hope of getting an army. He was successful, getting an army of Crusaders from the Kingdom of Jerusalem. But by the time he reached the Euphrates River, he heard of Baldwin's new situation. Belek returned to Kharput before Joscelin returned with aid. Belek Ghazi mined the walls of the city and forced Baldwin to surrender. Belek ordered the execution of the Armenians and transferred Baldwin to Harran. Baldwin was later imprisoned in the Citadel of Aleppo.

After this success Belek Ghazi was besieging Manbij, after he imprisoned its emir Hassan al-Ba'labakki ibn Gümüshtigin who had pledged allegiance to Joscelin, in which he managed to capture the city, but the castle was still controlled by the defenders led by Hassan's brother Isa. Joscelin's force tried to help the defenders, but Belek forced them to retreat to Turbessel and maintained the siege until he was hit and killed by an arrow on 6 May 1124. Timurtash, son of Ilghazi, was now the sole ruler of his domains. But after Belek Ghazi's death, the many clans and branches of the Artuqids started fighting with each other, due to Timurtash's weak and loose rule. Kharput was annexed by the Artuqids of Hasankeyf.

On hearing of Belek's death, the defenders of the Tyre again urged Toghtekin to attack the Crusaders. Toghtekin assembled his army and marched for Tyre, determined to relieve the city just like he did in 1112. Toghtekin hoped that the Crusaders had already sustained heavy losses from the siege and that he had the element of surprise. However, he only marched as far as Banias. Warmund appointed William and Pons to launch a military expedition against Toghtekin. The Crusaders gathered all of their knights in order to fight off the Burids. Toghtekin, who depended on his element of surprise and was surprised by the Crusader response, retreated back to Damascus. Meanwhile, a messenger of Joscelin brought the severed head of Belek to the siege camp. Pons was chosen to confer knighthood on him.

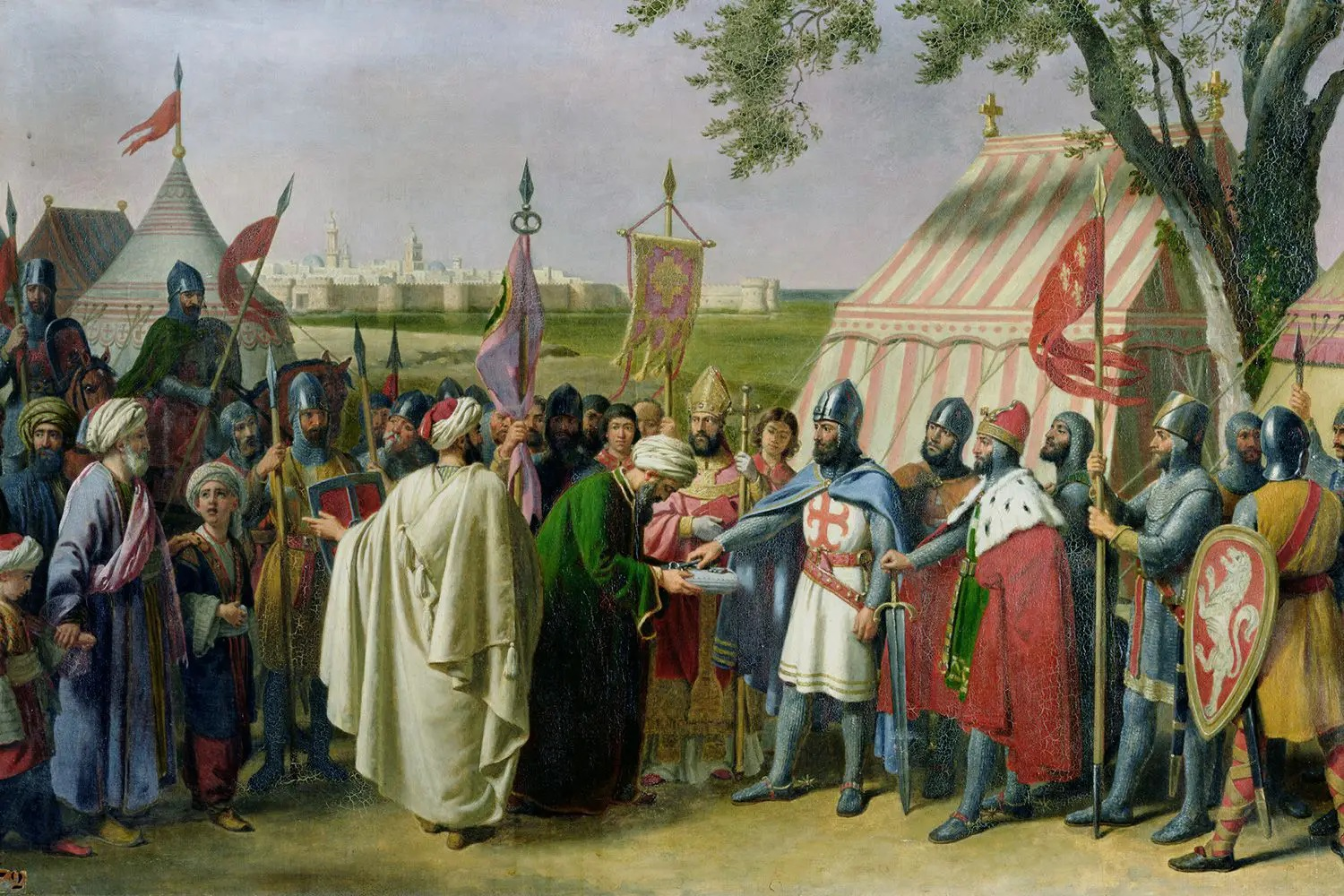
Pons of Tripoli, accepting the surrender of the city of Tyre from atabeg Toghtekin, on July 7, 1124; Painting by Alexandre-François Caminade, 1840.

After their victory, the Venetians and Crusaders built siege towers and engines. The defenders of Tyre also built engines, hurling rocks at the siege towers. The Tyrians, in a desperate sortie, managed burn down most of the Crusader siege equipment. The Crusaders, encouraged by all their successes, rebuilt many of their siege engines, aided by engineers from Antioch. The Tyrians sent another plea for aid to Damascus, but Toghtekin knew the city was lost. He sent envoys in June 1124 to the Crusader camp to negotiate peace. After lengthy and difficult discussions it was agreed that the city would surrender

on condition that those citizens who wished to be allowed to depart freely with their wives and children and all their substance, while those who preferred to remain at Tyre should be granted permission to do so and their homes and possessions guaranteed them.

This was unpopular with some of the Crusaders, who wanted to loot the city, but William managed to convince such Crusaders to accept the deal. As per the agreement, many of the people who left Tyre moved to Damascus. Tyre surrendered on 7 July 1124, marking the last of the Muslim seaports on the Levant other than Ascalon to fall to the Crusaders. After the capture of Tyre Pons's banner was one of the three flags erected over the town's towers. After the Crusader forces entered the city, according to William of Tyre, "They admired the fortifications of the city, the strength of the buildings, the massive walls and lofty towers, the noble harbour so difficult of access. They had only praise for the resolute perseverance of the citizens who, despite the pressure of terrible hunger and the scarcity of supplies, had been able to ward off surrender for so long. For when our forces took possession of the place they found only five measures of wheat in the city."

Under its new rulers, Tyre and its countryside were divided into three parts in accordance with the Pactum Warmundi: two-thirds to the royal domain of Baldwin and one third as autonomous trading colonies for the Italian merchant cities: mainly to the Doge of Venice, who had a particular interest in supplying silica sands to the glassmakers of Venice and in the sugar-cane plantations on the mainland. In addition, there were a Genoese quarter, and a Pisan neighbourhood.

On the return journey to Venice, the Venetian fleet of 72 ships plundered Rhodes, Chios, Samos, Lesbos, Andros and captured Kefalonia in the Ionian Sea. Eventually Emperor John II Komnenos was forced to come to terms; the war was costing him more than it was worth, and he was not prepared to transfer funds from the imperial land forces to the navy for the construction of new ships. John re-confirmed the treaty of 1082 in August 1126. Michiel triumphantly returned to Venice in June 1125. He had helped the Christians in the Holy Land and weakened the hostile Eastern Romans. The inscription on Michiel's tomb does not describe him as a religious crusader, but rather as a terror Graecorum...et laus Venetorum ("A horror to the Greeks...and praise from the Venetians").

== Aftermath ==
Baldwin II was in captivity during the conquest of Tyre, but was released later that year. He immediately broke the terms of his release. Baldwin II granted the Venetians extensive commercial privileges in Tyre, and thus ensured that they would maintain a naval presence in the Latin East. The privilege included guarantees of property rights for the heirs of Venetians who were shipwrecked or who died in Tyre.

Many of the people who left Tyre moved to Damascus. Baldwin II resumed hostilities against Aleppo and Damascus, and obtained tribute from both states. Under Baldwin II the kingdom of Jerusalem grew to its greatest extent. Tyre prospered as part of the kingdom of Jerusalem. When the Holy Roman Emperor Frederick I Barbarossa died during the Third Crusade he was buried in the Tyre Cathedral. The town was captured and destroyed by the Mamluks in 1291.

The Venetian fleet passed through the Aegean Sea on the return voyage. The Venetians again pillaged Greek islands. The Greeks were forced to abandon the dispute and confirm the commercial privileges of Venice.

Baldwin II ratified the Pactum Warmundi upon his release from captivity in 1125, although he refused to recognize the Venetian communes as fully autonomous entities within the Kingdom; he asserted his feudal rights by asking for the service of three Venetian knights. The treaty seems to have been in force up to the fall of the kingdom in 1291, and the Venetian communes in Acre and Tyre were particularly powerful and influential in the 13th century after the kingdom lost Jerusalem and was reduced to a coastal state. They resisted Emperor Frederick II's attempts to claim the Kingdom, and virtually ignored the authority of the Lord of Tyre. Instead, they conducted their affairs as if they controlled their own independent lordship—which, essentially, they did, thanks to the terms of the Pactum.

Other Italian and Provençal city-states demanded and were granted similar commercial treaties by the King of Jerusalem throughout the 12th and 13th centuries, notably the Genoese and Pisans. The communes established by these treaties were in a sense an early form of European colonialism, and were an important step in the commercial development of the Italian city-states that culminated in the Italian Renaissance in the following centuries.

== The Crusader States (1125–1129) ==
=== Siege of Aleppo ===
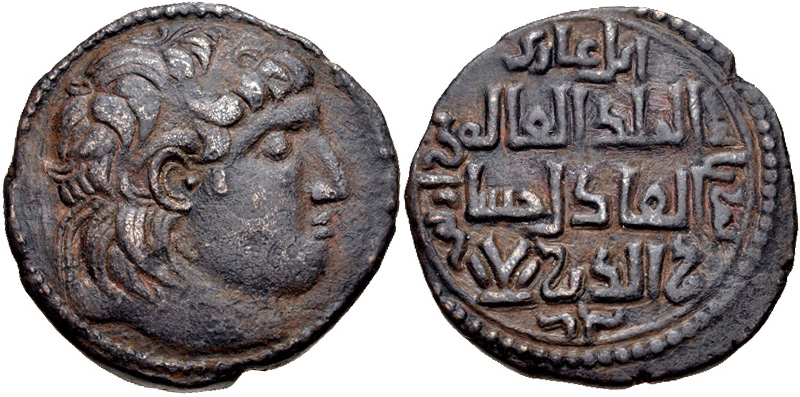
Coinage of Husam al-Din Timurtash. Diademed, Seleukid-style bust right. Name and titles of Timurtash in four lines and in margins.

After Belek Ghazi died fighting against one of his rebellious officials on 6 May 1124, Baldwin was seized by Ilghazi's son, Timurtash. Timurtash entrusted the Munqidhite Sultan, the emir of Shaizar, with commencing negotiations for Baldwin's release with Joscelin and Morphia of Melitene. The Munqidhites agreed to do so because they wanted to improve their relations with the Crusaders. According to their agreement, the Crusaders were to pay 80,000 dinars and to cede Atharib, Zardana, Azaz, Sarmin, Kafr Tab, Sarmada, Ma’arat al-Numan, Bara and other Antiochene border fortresses east of the Orontes River to Timurtash. This meant that literally every single fortress that Baldwin had been recapture in all of his four-year span of campaigns was lost again to the Turks. Baldwin also promised that he would assist Timurtash against the Bedouin warlord, Dubays ibn Sadaqa of the Banu Mazyad, whom Ibn al-Khashshab publicly denounced. Baldwin was released after a quarter of Baldwin's ransom was paid and a dozen hostages, which included Baldwin's youngest daughter Ioveta of Bethany and Joscelin's son Joscelin II, were handed over to Timurtash to secure the payment of the balance, Baldwin was released on 29 August 1124.

Upon leaving captivity, Baldwin II of Jerusalem realized how bad the agreement was. With all the border fortresses gone, it would make the Artuqids once again a threat to the security of the Principality of Antioch, what he had been trying to protect for literally his entire reign as king. Baldwin decided that he would break the agreement (as he hoped that Timurtash would be honorable and not mistreat any of the hostages), and he had the perfect excuse for doing so. The legal ruler of the Principality of Antioch was Bernard of Valence in the absence of Bohemond II and he, not Morphia of Melitene or Joscelin, had the right to make decisions of Antioch's territory. So when Baldwin decided to ask Bernard for permission to honor the agreement and give up the border fortresses, Bernard refused. This meant that Baldwin wasn't legally entitled to honor the agreement and he started to assemble forces from the Kingdom of Jerusalem, County of Edessa, County of Tripoli, and the Principality of Antioch, preparing once more for the showdown with the Artuqids. Baldwin then made an alliance with Dubays ibn Sadaqa, a Bedouin warlord of the Banu Mazyad who was an Artuqid enemy, who joined Baldwin's army with a Bedouin contingent.

Baldwin II decided to attack Aleppo to free the hostages before Timurtash could act, hostages which included Baldwin's youngest daughter Ioveta and Joscelin's heir Joscelin II, both of whom were handed over to Timurtash to secure the release payment. To help him with his siege, he made an alliance with two Turkish princes who had a claim to the throne and whom Baldwin planned to install as the ruler of Aleppo after he took it, Sultan Shah ibn Radwan and Toghrul Arslan. They both provided Baldwin with Turkish troops and both had supporters inside the city, who might cooperate with the Crusaders. After preparations for the siege were finished, the Muslim-Crusader army under Baldwin II of Jerusalem, Joscelin I of Edessa, and Dubays ibn Saqawa, marched straight for Aleppo. The Crusader army completely surrounded Aleppo, cutting off Aleppan supply lines.

When the crusaders besieged Aleppo in 1124, and when they desecrated the Mashhad al-Muhassin (Note: Also referred to as Mashhad al-Dikka.) outside the city, qadi Ibn al-Khashshab ordered that four of the six Christian churches in the city, including the sixth-century Syrian cathedral, be converted into mosques. Quickly into the siege, Aleppo started to run out of supplies and supporters of Sultan Shah were allegedly planning to open the gates for the Crusaders. So the qadi of Aleppo, Ibn al-Khashshab, sent an embassy demanding Timurtash's return during the Siege of Aleppo.

Timurtash was too busy fighting with his brother Suleiman of Mayyafariqin in September 1124, but the two brothers did not get along and Aleppo was left to its own fate. Suleiman died in Mayyafariqin, late 1124 or late 1130, and Timurtash was recognized in that city. But since he was busy with Suleiman, when the embassy arrived, Timurtash refused to help them. He was so irritated by their complaints that he even imprisoned them. But the messengers escaped and then the embassy went to Aqsunqur al-Bursuqi, emir of Mosul, pledging their and Aleppo's allegiance him.

Aqsunqur al-Bursuqi was one of the warlords appointed by Muhammad I Tapar, Sultan of the Great Seljuk Empire to lead jihad against the Crusaders in the 1110s. As leader of jihad, Al-Bursuqi had launched a devastating raid against the County of Edessa in April and May 1115. As the Artuqid ruler of Mardin, Ilghazi, had declined to participate in the campaign, al-Bursuqi invaded his territory, but Ilghazi defeated his troops. After these unsuccessful campaigns, al-Bursuqi was ousted as leader of jihad by the dissatisfied Seljuk Sultan. And then from Mosul, al-Bursuqi just watched the person who wasn't cooperating with him in his campaigns, Ilghazi, get all the glory in his victories against Crusaders. Aqsunqur al-Bursuqi was eager to use this opportunity to get back on the Artuqids, by getting glory by fighting Christians and also by taking over Aleppo and all of Northern Syria with it from them.

Al-Bursuqi decided to intervene and gathered his troops. As he marched to fight the Crusaders (and undermine the Artuqids), he received the blessing of the Sultan of the Great Seljuk Empire, Mahmud II. This helped him convince many other Muslim nations to contribute soldiers to his cause, like Toghtekin of the Burid dynasty. This led him to amass a colossal army of 15,000, way more soldiers the Crusaders were capable of amassing. On learning of al-Bursuqi's approach, Dubays ibn Sadaqa wanted to lead his Bedouins to block Al-Bursuqi's crossing of the Euphrates River at the Syrian city of Raqqa but Baldwin continued the siege with his Crusaders. Baldwin thought that the fall of the siege was imminent and it would capitulate before Al-Bursuqi and his colossal army could arrive. He was wrong and Dubays withdrew from Aleppo, which forced Baldwin to lift the siege on 25 January 1125. In 1125, Al-Bursuqi reclaimed Aleppo for the Seljuk sultan Mahmud II.

After the siege ended, Baldwin II of Jerusalem ended the campaign for him to return to Jerusalem after two years of captivity. Satisfied by his victory, Al-Bursuqi decided to celebrate in Aleppo. The city submitted itself to him, surrendering its citadel, treasury, and all the Christian hostages who were earlier held by Timurtash. Al-Bursuqi now officially ruled Aleppo and all of Northern Syria.

=== Battle of Azaz ===
After more than two years' absence, Baldwin returned to Jerusalem on 3 April. Baldwin II ratified the Pactum upon his release from captivity in 1125, although he refused to recognize the Venetian communes as fully autonomous entities within the Kingdom; he asserted his feudal rights by asking for the service of three Venetian knights. He renegotiated the Pactum Warmundi with the Venetians, approving most of its terms in the so-called Pactum Balduini, but also stipulating that the Venetians were to provide military assistance to the kingdom. The privilege included guarantees of property rights for the heirs of Venetians who were shipwrecked or who died in Tyre. The careers of some influential lords started around the time when Baldwin returned to Jerusalem in 1125. Walter I Brisebarre witnessed the Pactum Balduini as lord of Beirut on 2 May 1125. Then Baldwin once again heard news of troubles from the north.

After securing his new domain, Al-Bursuqi demanded for Baldwin to honor the agreement signed between the Crusaders and Timurtash and therefore asked for all Antiochene border fortresses east of the Orontes River. Al-Bursuqi first attacked Kafartab and Bara, both of which he took from the Crusaders.Then Aqsunqur al-Bursuqi, was joined by Toghtekin and Khirkan of Homs and then laid siege to Zardana. Zardana resisted and sent a plea of aid to Baldwin. Baldwin assembled troops from the Crusader states, including a contingent of Tripolitans under Pons of Tripoli and Edessans under Joscelin I of Edessa. Baldwin was also joined by Armenians under Leo I of Armenia of the Armenian Kingdom of Cilicia. Baldwin managed to assemble a force of 1,100 knights from their respective territories and 2,000 infantry. However, few knights accompanied him from the Kingdom of Jerusalem, which according to Murray and Barber may have been a sign of discontent over his frequent campaigns. The united forces of Jerusalem, Antioch, Tripoli and Edessa defeated Bursuqi at Zardana on 11 June, forcing him to lift the siege of the fort.

Al-Bursuqi besieged the town of Azaz, to the north of Aleppo, in territory belonging to the County of Edessa. Knowing that he could not let this city fall, Baldwin met al-Bursuqi outside Azaz, where the Seljuk atabeg had gathered his much larger force. He arrived just as the Turks were about to break through and take the city. Baldwin made his camp just outside Azaz, near to the Turkish camp. From here, Baldwin was able to create a line of communication with the Crusader defenders of Azaz. Upon sighting the Crusaders, Aqsunqur al-Bursuqi launched waves and waves of Turkish horse archers who constantly barraged the Crusaders with arrows, javelins, and spears. They inflicted many casualties, and the Crusaders couldn't forage for food due to the danger of being picked off by Turkish riders. The Crusaders quickly began to run out of food and supplies. At this point, the Turkish horse archers took out their melee weapons and charged into the Crusader camp. A hastily formed Crusader line was crushed, and it began to become clear that the numerically superior Turks would overpower the Christians. Then Baldwin made a plan.

Baldwin made a feigned retreat, with his army making an organized retreat out of their camp into the open. The Turks started chasing the Crusaders, getting out of formation and becoming disorganized. After retreating for two miles, Baldwin stopped the retreat and gave his hungry and tired troops a quick rest. After doing so, his army turned around and charged the disorganized Turks. The Turkish cavalry had already begun to run out of arrows, so they attempted to engage the Crusaders in brutal close-quarter combat. Joscelin, reportedly fighting like a lion, managed to break the Turkish line. After a long and bloody battle, the Turks were defeated and their camp captured by Baldwin, who took loot estimated to be about 80,000 bezants.

The number of Muslim troops killed was more than 1,000, according to Ibn al-Athir. William of Tyre gave 24 dead for the Crusaders and 2,000 for the Muslims. Fulcher of Chartres suggested 5 emirs and 2,000 soldiers dead, while Matthew of Edessa estimated 15 emirs and 5,000 troops killed. This was one of the greatest victories in Crusader history and one of the worst in Turkish history. The battle has been described by historian Peter Lock as "one of the bloodiest engagements in the history of the crusader states". Spoils seized enabled Baldwin to pay off his ransom before his return to Jerusalem. Al-Bursuqi retired to Aleppo, leaving his son Masud as governor and crossed the Euphrates to Mosul, where he gathered troops to renew the fight.

As Baldwin II of Jerusalem prepared to continue his campaign against Aleppo, the rightful prince of Antioch, the son of the legendary Bohemond of Taranto, Bohemond II of Antioch arrived. He landed at the port of St. Symeon in the Principality of Antioch in October or November. He went to Antioch to meet Baldwin II of Jerusalem, who was so impressed by his appearance, let him marry his daughter, Alice, and then subsequently ceded Antioch to him. Bohemond was officially installed as prince in Baldwin's presence. Bohemond was tall, blonde, and strong, and resembled his father, Bohemond of Taranto. Matthew of Edessa portrayed Bohemond as "a forceful character and great power." So when Baldwin was preparing to continue his campaign, it quickly got jeopardized by Bohemond's temper, who ceased cooperating with Edessa, leading to the plan falling through. So Al-Bursuqi and Baldwin settled for peace talks which resulted in every Antiochene fortress east of the Orontes River other than Kafartab being controlled by the Crusaders. Through the loot taken from the Muslim camp after the Battle of Azaz, Baldwin managed to secure the release of the hostages, which included the future Joscelin II of Edessa and Baldwin's daughter, Ioveta. The ransom went to Al-Bursuqi, not Husam al-Din Timurtash, who protested, but the weak Artuqid could do nothing to change the state of affairs. Baldwin returned to Jerusalem where mass crowds celebrated the great victory at the Battle of Azaz.

=== Battle of Marj al-Saffar ===
As Baldwin was campaigning in Northern Syria, a Fatimid force from Ascalon started raiding the southern lands of the Kingdom. The noble Pagan the Butler was first mentioned as lord of Oultrejordain in 1126. According to William of Tyre, Pagan seized Oultrejordain after Roman of Le Puy and his son, Ralph, had been deprived of the territory. Murray argues that Baldwin must have confiscated Oultrejordain from Roman because Roman had been one of his opponents during his captivity. Murray also says that Baldwin allegedly adopted an expansionist policy against Damascus in the late 1120s to assuage the Jerusalemite noblemen's discontent. With these two problems, Baldwin decided to deal with the Burid, then Fatimid threats simultaneously. Baldwin first entered into Burid territory in 1125 by crossing the Jordan River, after which he plundered a few villages before returning to the Kingdom. Then he moved to Ascalon, where he lured the Fatimid army from the city with a feigned retreat, before completely annihilating it. The Fatimids stopped invading the Kingdom for a while after this defeat.

For the first time ever in Crusader history, all of their Muslim neighbors, which included the Fatimid Caliphate, the Burid Emirate of Damascus, the Artuqids, and Aqsunqur al-Bursuqi’s emirate of Aleppo and Mosul, were all weakened and defeated. Each one of them couldn’t afford to launch another attack on the Crusaders, which gave the crusaders a rare opportunity to counterattack one of their neighbors. Baldwin decided to focus his efforts against Damascus, as their ruler, Toghtekin was growing old and was starting to lose his grip. Baldwin also hoped that the Principality of Antioch, under Bohemond II of Antioch, and the County of Edessa, under Joscelin I of Edessa, could cooperate to take Aleppo. If both plans succeeded, the Crusaders were the master of the Levant. Baldwin put his plan in action by assembling a Crusader army from all the Crusader Kingdoms. After doing so, Baldwin launched his invasion against Damascene territory across the Jordan River in early 1126. From Tiberias, the Crusader army marched through the Hauran region for Damascus.

Baldwin's army consisted of the usual mounted knights and men-at-arms supported by spearmen and bowmen on foot. On 25 January 1126, at Marj al-Saffar, 30 kilometers outside Damascus, the Crusaders encountered the army of Damascus which offered battle. The Damascene army was led by Zahir al-Din Toghtekin and his son, Taj al-Muluk Buri.

Only a few details are known about the battle. What we do know is that the Crusaders lost many men to Turkish archery in a very close-fought engagement. "But a strong attack made late in the day gave them a hard-won victory. Their tactical success left them unable to achieve their object in undertaking the campaign, which was the conquest of Damascus." Another historian writes, "Crusader forces had a clear win but were unable to press home their advantage." A third writer notes that the Crusader victory occurred because Toghtekin "fell from his horse and, thinking that he had been killed, his companions fled." Because of their heavy casualties, the Crusaders were forced to end their campaign and retreat. If the Crusaders hadn't taken so many losses, they might have easily taken Damascus, which was then largely undefended. Baldwin returned home laden with booty.

Some Nizari Ismailis from Homs and elsewhere were involved in the defense of Damascus. This contributed to the establishment of the alliance between the Nizari leader Bahram al-Da'i, who was the Chief Da'i of Syria, and the Burids.

=== Battle of Beirut ===
In 1126, Pons of Tripoli sought help from the king in attacking Rafaniya (an important castle once held by Pons' grandfather, but lost to Toghtekin in 1115). The fortress was also strategically important as it let the Burids guard the Orontes River Valley near Homs. Baldwin, especially eager to weaken the Burids of Damascus in any way he could, decided to help Pons. They besieged the fortress for 18 days and captured it on 31 March 1126.

After the fall of Rafaniya, after the Easter of 1126, the Latin king, Baldwin II of Jerusalem, heard rumors of an upcoming invasion by a Fatimid fleet, which gave him a reason to return to Tyre. If Toghtekin was to cooperate with the Fatimids, he would have to compromise both land and naval forces.news came to Baldwin that Al-Bursuqi laid siege to Atharib in July 1126. Baldwin decided to divide his forces, leaving some on the Levantine coast to fend off a possible Fatimid attack while the rest to meet the Turks.

The Fatimid fleet passed by several coastal cities held by the Crusaders. The navy was exploring and waiting as far as Beirut, hoping to catch an opportunity to cause damage to the Crusaders. The navy was unsupported by land forces and was unable to take supplies anywhere north of Ascalon. The Fatimids began to suffer from thirst due to a lack of fresh water. They were forced to land to fetch waters from streams and springs. They landed near Beirut. The Crusader garrison of Beirut, consisting of the population and pilgrims, was watching the Fatimids and launched a sortie with knights and archers. The Crusaders routed the Fatimids and drove them to the sea, killing many sailors while others died from arrow wounds as they were running to boats. The battle was the last attempt by the Fatimids to mount any offensive against the Crusaders, and its end proved that Antioch's threat was very important to focus on.

Baldwin again marched north to fight the Turks and Joscelin of Edessa joined him at Artah. Both sides wanted to avoid a pitched battle, and al-Bursuqi retired to Mosul. Al-Bursuqi's constant failures to fight the Crusaders led to his growing unpopularity. After the campaign, on November 26, 1126, Aqsunqur al-Bursuqi was assassinated by a team of 10 Nizari Assassins attacking him with knives while he was at the Great Mosque of Mosul. He wounded three of his assassins before his death. The murderers were captured and executed. The attack was presumably ordered by Mahmud II. His son Mas’ûd ibn Bursuqî replaced him in Mosul, but his reign was short-lived because of the rise of one Imad al-Din Zengi.

With the death of Aqsunqur al-Bursuqi, Baldwin realized that his dream to conquer Aleppo and all of Northern Syria was suddenly possible. But such a thing happening required the cooperation between Bohemond II of Antioch and Joscelin I of Edessa. Bohemond first captured Kafartab from Aqsunqur al-Bursuqi in early 1127. According to historian Steven Runciman, Bohemond's attacked the Munqidhites of Shaizar, which was recorded by Usama ibn Munqidh, also occurred during this period.

Then Bohemond heard troubling news. Joscelin had launched an invasion of Aleppo but it failed miserably. Due to the failure of his campaign and his jealousy of Bohemond's successes, Joscelin turned against Bohemond. Joscelin demanded Bohemond cede Azaz to him, since Roger of Salerno promised it to Joscelin as the dowry of his second wife, Maria of Salerno. Since Roger, as regent of Aleppo in his absence, had no right to give away land, Bohemond refused. So Joscelin seized former Antiochene territories from Il-Bursuqi, governor of Mosul. Taking advantage of Bohemond's absence due to his campaigns against the Munqidhites of Shaizar, Joscelin then invaded Antioch with the assistance of Turkish mercenaries, plundering the villages along the frontier.

Bernard of Valence, Latin Patriarch of Antioch, imposed an interdict on the County of Edessa. Baldwin II of Jerusalem hurried to Syria with an army to mediate between Bohemond and Joscelin in early 1128. Baldwin had become concerned that this quarrel might just ruin his plans to take Aleppo as remember, it depended on Antiochene and Edessan cooperation. He also thought that it might make the two nations vulnerable to Muslim invasion and exploitation. Joscelin, who had become seriously ill, agreed to restore the property to Bohemond and to do homage to him. However, the conflict between Bohemond and Joscelin enabled Imad ad-Din Zengi, Il-Bursuqi's successor as governor of Mosul, to seize Aleppo without resistance on 28 June 1128.

Meanwhile, Bohemond's cousin William II of Apulia had died without issue on 25 July 1127. Pope Honorius II tried to prevent Count Roger II of Sicily (the cousin of both William and Bohemond) from seizing Apulia, but Roger did not obey him. In May 1128, he invaded Bohemond's Principality of Taranto., capturing Taranto, Otranto and Brindisi without resistance. He completed the conquest of the whole principality around 15 June. Bohemond now only ruled land in the Levant.

In August or September 1127, Baldwin launched a new military campaign against Damascene territory. Historian Steven Tibble proposes that the royal fortress at Wadi Musa was built shortly after this. In 1128, Warmund of Picquigny, laid a siege on Belhacem, which was occupied by brigands. However, he fell seriously ill and was taken to Sidon, where he died in July 1128.

=== Call for the Crusade of 1129 ===
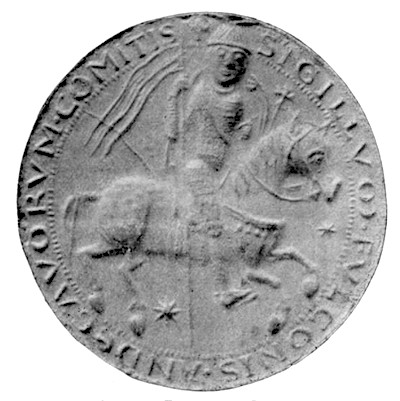
Fulk, depicted here on his seal as count of Anjou, was already an experienced ruler when he was selected to marry Melisende.

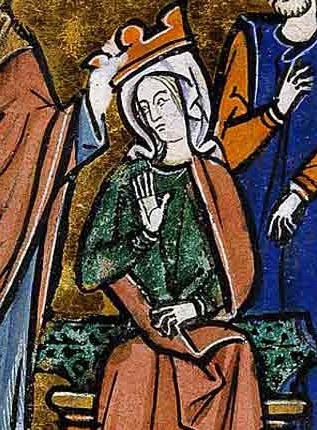
Melisende, Baldwin's daughter

Baldwin postponed a new invasion of Damascus to take the opportunity to pick his heir. Baldwin was in his fifties and now was the time for many monarchs to consider the problem to prevent any interregnums. Baldwin had been shown that he couldn't trust either Bohemond or Joscelin after their quarrel, the Outremer couldn't afford disunity. Baldwin also didn't trust Pons, who had rebelled against Jerusalem once already. So Baldwin, who had no sons, made his eldest daughter, Melisende, his heir in 1126 or 1127. This meant that Melisende needed to get a strong husband for him to manage the Kingdom's military affairs, including helping him in his invasion of Damascus. Baldwin decided to find one abroad in Europe. Baldwin had already realized, after the Battle of Marj al-Saffar that the Crusaders were unable to conquer Damascus without further reinforcements from Europe. So Baldwin decided he could try to rally Europe for a crusade while looking for a suitable husband to help lead it.

After consulting with his barons, he chose Fulk V of Anjou. Many factors argued in favor of Fulk's candidacy: he had visited Jerusalem and supported the kingdom and the Templars; his son Geoffrey had come of age in 1126; and his wife Erembourg died in the same year. The assassination of Count Charles the Good of Flanders in 1127, who had likewise visited Jerusalem in his youth and was a popular contender, made Fulk the obvious choice.

He appointed William I of Bures, prince of Galilee, Guy I Brisebarre, and the Master and co-founder of the Knights Templar Hugh of Payns. The embassy was tasked with raising an army for an attack on Damascus and to lead an embassy to County of Anjou to start negotiations with Fulk. After consulting with his barons, Baldwin had decided to offer Melisende's hand in marriage to Fulk, with the promises that they should be married within 50 days of Fulk's arrival in the Latin East and that Fulk could expect to hold the kingdom after Baldwin's death. William was authorized to inform Fulk of this. The embassy departed in the autumn of 1127.

In Spring 1128, the embassy reached Anjou. Hans Eberhard Mayer has reconstructed the extensive negotiations that must have taken place between Fulk and the ambassadors, which he believes led Baldwin II to treat both Fulk and Melisende as the "heir of the king" (heres regni) to forestall any challenge to their succession. By 31 May, Fulk seems to have accepted their offer, for he took the cross on that day in Le Mans on 31 May 1128. He spent the next year setting his affairs in order, transferring lordship over Anjou and Maine to his son Geoffrey, who had married Matilda, daughter of King Henry I of England. Fulk apparently did not relinquish the title of "count of Anjou", perhaps as insurance in case the Jerusalem plan did not succeed. In about March 1129, Fulk departed for Jerusalem accompanied by a number of crusaders recruited from Anjou and the surrounding region.

Baldwin I of Jerusalem dispatched Hugh of Payns to Europe to recruit powerful men to the cause of a campaign against Burid Damascus. He also sought papal approval of his military order, the Templars. The third embassy, undertaken by Archbishop William I of Tyre and Bishop Roger of Ramla, was to secure the approval of Pope Honorius II for the marriage between Melisende and Fulk, since it would result in Fulk becoming King of Jerusalem upon Baldwin's death. In a letter of May 1128, Honorius confirmed Baldwin II as the legitimate king of Jerusalem and approved Fulk as his heir.

It is not certain if Baldwin received a papal endorsement for his offensive action. Jonathan Phillips calls it "an early example of a crusade that was wholly aggressive in its purpose". In terms of protecting the Holy Places, it could be justified only as the removal of a nearby threat. Circumstantial evidence suggests that it may have received papal approval. (Note: See Phillips (2006) but Lock (2006) does not read it this way.) Charters show prospective crusaders taking their vows in exchange for the remission of sins, something only the church could have guaranteed. A papal legate, Bishop Gerard of Angoulême, was present when Fulk, having accepted the marriage proposal, made his vow at Le Mans in May 1128. Hugh did not personally meet the pope, however, but only a papal legate, Matthew of Albano, at the Council of Troyes in January 1129, where the rule of the Templars was approved. The absence of direct evidence of papal involvement may indicate "lack of clarity in how crusades should be started" at this early date. (Note: Riley-Smith (1997) also doubts there was papal involvement in its planning.)

The recruitment of the crusade was unique. It was undertaken entirely by Baldwin II's agents, principally Hugh of Payns. There is no evidence of preaching. The only previous expedition recruited in this way was the Crusade of 1107, which was recruited in France by its leader, Bohemond I of Antioch, who had papal approval. No subsequent crusade was recruited by men sent from the crusader states but rather by European preachers.

It is unknown how many crusaders Hugh recruited in Europe. Both Christian and Muslim sources agree that the army Fulk brought with him was a large one. According to the Anglo-Saxon Chronicle, "there went with [Hugh of Payns] and after him so large a number of people as never had done since the first expedition", i.e., the First Crusade of 1096–1099. The Gesta Ambaziensium dominorum records "innumerable knights and foot soldiers and many men of consular rank", i.e., counts. The recruits came mostly from Anjou, Champagne, Flanders, Normandy and Provence. There is some evidence that Hugh recruited in England and Scotland. He received a large sum of money from King Henry I of England. According to Orderic Vitalis, many of William Clito's followers joined the crusade after the assassination of their lord.

The army for the Damascus campaign was not raised entirely in Europe. The other crusader states—the Principality of Antioch, the County of Edessa and the County of Tripoli—also sent forces led personally by their respective rulers—Bohemond II, Joscelin I and Pons. The contemporary Damascene chronicler Ibn al-Ḳalānisī places the total force raised by both Hugh and Fulk at 60,000 men, mostly infantry. Ibn al-Athīr, writing in the 13th century, gives the number of knights as 2,000 and the infantry as numerous. Thomas Asbridge estimates the size of the combined army (including the crusader states' forces) at 2,000 knights and 10,000 infantry. Jamal Al-Zanki estimates the army at 30,000 with only 2,000 knights.

Ibn al-Ḳalānisī says that Damascus had 8,000 mercenaries and volunteers drawn from the Bedouin and the Turcomans. This was in addition to the regular army, which was mostly composed of Turcomans and probably numbered about 7,000. The commander of the Bedouin auxiliaries was Murra ibn Rabīʿa. According to Ibn al-Ḳalānisī, the Turcoman auxiliaries in the Damascene army looked forward to fighting infidels, an attitude that seems to presage the rise of jihadist politics among the Muslims.

=== Fall of Banias ===
Fulk sailed in early or mid-April and arrived in the Kingdom of Jerusalem in late May 1129. He seems to have delayed his departure for about a year in order to allow Hugh of Payns time to recruit an army, since it was safest and most efficient for the entire European army to travel together. His marriage to Melisende took place in Jerusalem before the campaign against Damascus, Feast of Pentecost, 2 June 1129. As Melisende's dowry, Baldwin II presented Fulk with the cities of Acre and Tyre. The Crusade did not set out until October.

Winter campaigns were unusual and the Damascus campaign is often seen as delayed by unknown factors. Hugh did not arrive in the Kingdom of Jerusalem until several months after the Council of Troyes, which Christopher Tyerman cites as a possible cause of the delay. On the other hand, the campaign is sometimes seen as hastened rather than delayed. Baldwin was waiting for the right time to attack Damascus.

Damascus was in crisis. On the 12th of February, 1128, Toghtekin, the old ruler of Damascus, died, after a 24 year long reign. He was succeeded by his son, Taj al-Muluk Buri. Buri was in the middle of a dispute between his vizier, Abū ʿAlī Ṭāhir ibn Saʿd al-Mazdaqānī. Now a conflict between them ensued because of the Order of Assassins, also called the Nizaris. They had been given protection in 1126 by Toghtekin who had given them the town of Banias. Soon they expanded, even influencing the vizier, al-Mazdaqānī. The following year, al-Mazdaqānī discovered an alleged plot set by the Assassins to deliver Damascus to the Crusaders.

Then a rumor spread that al-Mazdaqānī and the Nizaris were conspiring with Baldwin. Ibn al-Athīr claimed that Baldwin II had negotiated an agreement with conspirators within Damascus to hand the city over to him. On a specified Friday, the vizier of Damascus, Abū ʿAlī Ṭāhir ibn Saʿd al-Mazdaqānī, was to lock the people in the mosque and open the gates to the crusaders. In return, the vizier would be given the city of Tyre, which had only recently been conquered for the Kingdom of Jerusalem by the Venetian Crusade.

In any case, no such handover occurred because the emir of Damascus, Tāj al-Mulūk Būrī, had al-Mazdaqānī and the Assassins who supported him massacred on 4 September 1129. This in turn propelled Isma'il al-Ajami, the Assassin commander of the town of Banias, to surrender his fortress to the crusaders and take refuge with his men in the Kingdom of Jerusalem. (Note: The Chronicle of 1234 records that Ismāʿīl's predecessor, Bahrām, who died in 1128, had planned to give his allegiance to Baldwin II. Al-Zanki (1989) records that Ismāʿīl died in crusader-controlled Banias early in the year AH 524, which began on 15 December 1129.) This was the only territorial acquisition associated with the Crusade of 1129. The crusader army marched out to accept the surrender of Banias before turning towards its main objective. The need to garrison Banias may have influenced the start date of the campaign. Baldwin placed Renier Brus in charge of Banyas.

=== Attack on Damascus ===
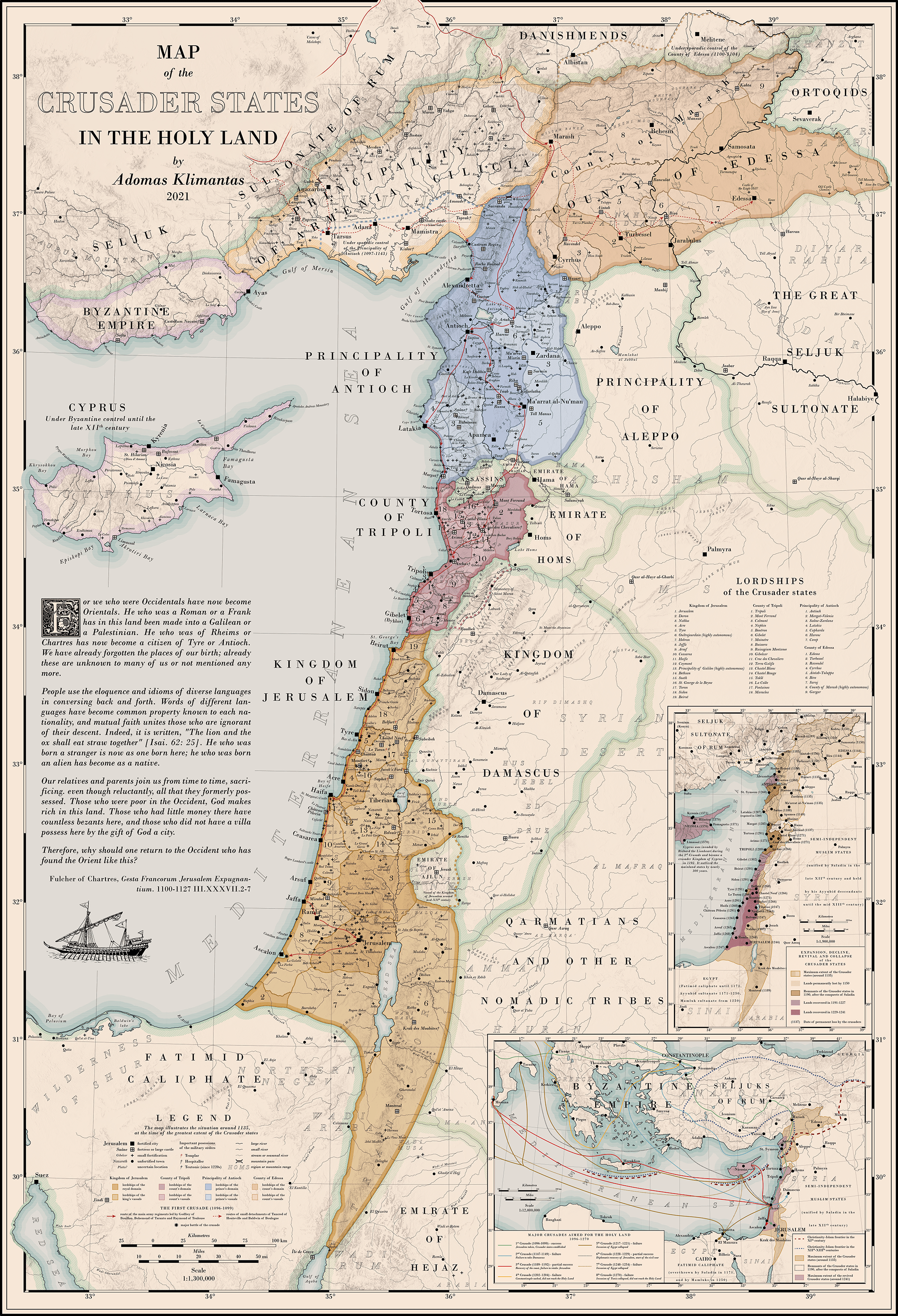
Detailed map of the Crusader states at the time of its greatest territorial extent and power after the Crusade of Damascus. The map shows more than 600 identified medieval fortified sites in the Holy Land.

After taking Banias, in October, the combined crusader army marched to within six miles of Damascus. They set up camp near the Wooden Bridge (Jisr al-Khashab) at Dārayyā southwest of the city. The Crusader army was large, as it included the new Crusaders led by Fulk and Hugh and the combined armies of all the Crusader states, led by Pons of Tripoli, Bohemond II of Antioch, Joscelin I of Edessa, and Baldwin II of Jerusalem. It consisted of at most, 2,000 knights and 10,000 infantry. According to William of Tyre, the goal was to take Damascus either by assault or by siege. Buri, hearing of the Latin attack, set up camp facing the Crusaders. Then a standoff ensued.

In the standoff, the Crusaders started running out of food. In early November, William I of Bures led a foraging expedition south into the Hauran. According to Muslim sources, this expedition consisted of the elite troops. William of Tyre says they were 1,000 knights "of lesser rank". The foragers carelessly spread themselves thin over a wide area. Learning of this, Tāj al-Mulūk Būrī sent his elite cavalry—a mixed force of Turcomans, Bedouins and the Askari of Hama under Shams al-Khawāṣṣ—to attack the foragers at a place called Burāq in the Marj al-Ṣuffar some twenty miles south of the main position. The foraging army was unprepared for an attack. According to Ibn al-Athīr, 300 knights and 10,000 sheep were captured. Only William of Bures and 39 others made it back to camp to report the rout. (Note: Runciman (1957) reports 45 other crusaders returning with William of Bures.) Būrī's panegyrist, Ibn al-Qaysarānī, praised this victory: "you [Būrī] led the horses, protected [your] land and folks".

Following the defeat, Baldwin II gave the order to attack, but the troops were prevented from advancing by a sudden thunderstorm and the ensuing fog. The rains made the road to Damascus impassable. According to William of Tyre, this was interpreted as divine punishment for their sins and a sign that they should retreat. Ibn al-Athīr and Ibn al-Ḳalānisī claim that the crusaders retreated out of fear of the army of Damascus. According to Michael the Syrian, who may be relying on the lost contemporary chronicle of Basil bar Shumna, Damascus paid 20,000 dinars and offered annual tribute in return for the crusaders' withdrawal. The crusader army decamped on 5 December, leaving behind a substantial baggage to be captured. Its rearguard was harassed by the enemy continuously during the retreat, which was slow but orderly. Upon its return, the army immediately broke up. According to Ibn al-Ḳalānisī, with its retreat "the hearts of the Muslims [of Damascus] were relieved from terror".

In examining the crusaders' defeat, Tyerman points out the logistical difficulties inherent in an attack on Damascus, which would require long supply lines across enemy territory. Al-Zanki suggests that a mere 2,000 knights would indicate a shortage of cavalrymen and horses. The failure of the crusade marks the end of a period of aggression that included the capture of Tyre and siege of Aleppo (1124) and three campaigns against Damascus. From here on, in the rest of the history of the Crusader states, they would stay on the defensive due to the resurgent power of the Muslims under Imad al-Din Zengi. After this Crusade, the territorial extent of the Crusader states had never been greater, and it would never have this much power and land ever again. The only subsequent crusader attempt on Damascus was made during the Second Crusade.
