= Domenico Michiel =

Doge of Venice from 1116/1117 to 1129/1130

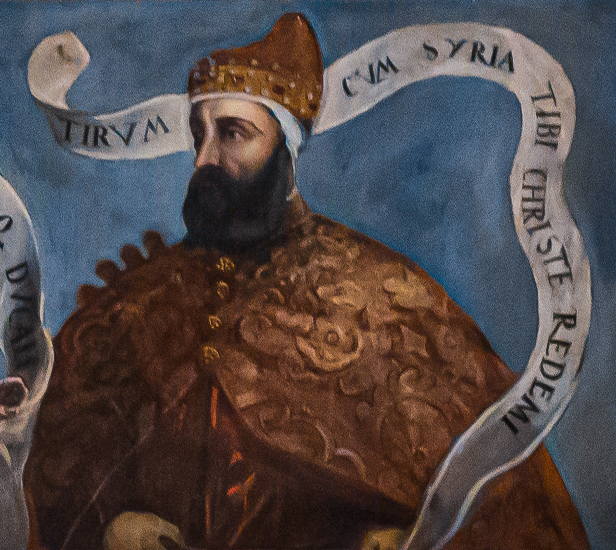
- Portrait in the Doge’s Palace

Doge of Venice
- In office 1116/117–1129/1130
- Preceded by: Ordelafo Faliero
- Succeeded by: Pietro Polani

Personal details
- Born: Unknown
- Died: c. 1130 San Giorgio Maggiore, Venice
- Resting place: San Giorgio Maggiore, Venice

Domenico Michiel (died c. 1130) was the 35th Doge of Venice from 1116 or 1117 to his resignation in late 1129 or early 1130.His reign saw the advent of the Venetian overseas empire with the capture of Tyre.

In August 1122 Domenico Michiel led a Venetian fleet of 100 vessels and around 15,000 men for the campaign in the Holy Land. The fleet sailed under the flag of St. Peter, which the Pope had sent to Michiel. Over the winter the fleet set siege Byzantine island of Corfu. The siege was cancelled in the spring when news arrived that King Baldwin II of Jerusalem had been captured by the Artuqids, and that the Kingdom of Jerusalem had subsequently been invaded by the Fatimids of Egypt. The Venetian fleet went to the defence of Jerusalem and defeated the Egyptian fleet off of the Syrian coast. The Venetians then landed at Acre; from there Michiel went to Jerusalem, where the Pactum Warmundi was signed granting Venice privileged trade concessions, tax freedoms, and even partial ownership of some cities within the Kingdom of Jerusalem.

On the return journey to Venice, the fleet looted Rhodes, attacked the islands Samos and Lesbos, and destroyed the city of Modon in the Peloponnese. Domenico Michiel triumphantly returned to Venice in June 1125. He had helped the Christians in the Holy Land and weakened the hostile Greeks. The inscription on Michiel's tomb does not describe him as a religious crusader, but rather as a terror Graecorum...et laus Venetorum ("A horror to the Greeks...and praise from the Venetians"). His dogaressa was Alicia.

Political offices
Preceded by Ordelafo Faliero	Doge of Venice; 1116/1117–1129/1130	Succeeded by Pietro Polani
