= Seljuk-Artuqid-Burid war =

Ilghazi and Toghtekin's rebellion
Date	1115
Location	Levant
Result	Inconclusive: Rebel-Crusader alliance dissolved

Belligerents
Artuqid dynasty • Emirate of Mardin • Emirate of Hasankeyf; Burid dynasty Seljuks of Aleppo; Principality of Antioch; Kingdom of Jerusalem; County of Tripoli	Seljuk Empire: Emirate of Hamadan; Emirate of Mosul; Emirate of Homs

Commanders and leaders
Ilghazi (POW); Toghtekin; Lu'lu' al-Khadim; Ayaz ibn Ilghazi (POW); Rukn al-Dawla Da'ud; Belek ibn Bahram; Shams al-Khawas; Roger of Salerno, Regent of Antioch; Baldwin I of Jerusalem; Pons, Count of Tripoli	Muhammad I Tapar; Mas'ud ibn Muhammed (POW); Bursuq ibn Bursuq, Emir of Hamadan; Aqsunqur al-Bursuqi, Emir of Mosul; Juyush Beg, Emir of Mosul; Konteghdi; Qayrakhan ibn Qarajah, Emir of Homs

Seljuk-Artuqid-Burid war, was a rebellion by the Artuqids and Burids against the Seljuk Muhammed I tapar. it happened in 1115

== Background ==
In 1114, Sultan Muhammed I Tapar commanded Aqsunqur al-Bursuqi, Emir of Mosul, to lead a campaign against the Crusaders. Aqsunqur gatherd an army, and marched west; and on the road, he crossed Mardin and asked its ruler, Ilghazi, to join him, the latter gave him 300 cavalry led by his son Ayaz. But the campaign ended in a defeat after a siege on Edessa failed, and the Seljuks had to retreat to Shahnan, and there, and out of a believe that the Artuqids didn't participate seriously, Aqsunqur arrested Ayaz.

== War ==
Aqsunqur started his war on the Artuqids with an raid on the suburbs Mardin. When Ilghazi heard of his son's arrest, he went to his nephew, Rukn al-Dawla Dawud, Emir of Hasankeyf, and sought his help. Rukn al-Dawla gatherd an army of Turkoman and joined his forces with those of Ilghazi, Belek ibn Bahram joined them too. In the beginnings of 1115, the Artuqids attacked the Seljuk army, and a fierce battle ensued and ended in a disastrous defeat for Aqsunqur. Mas'ud, nominal commander of the campaign and Muhammed I's son was captured and released later, Ayaz ibn Ilghazi fled and hid in a church, then sent a Kurd to inform his father of his location, who in turn sent a force to escort him. After hearing about the defeat and the capture of his son, with later reports of mistretment told by Mas'ud accordig to Matthew of Edessa, Muhammed I Tapar deposed Aqsunqur and sent threating Ilghazi and demanding his obedience, but Ilghazi declared defiance and rebelled.

Ilghazi went to his father-in-law, who was Toghtekin, Emir of Damascus. Toghtekin was already in a bad relation with the sultan, because Muhammed I accused him of plotting the assassination of Mawdud ibn al-Tuntakin, and so Ilghazi and Toghtekin had a shared hatred for the sultan, and decided to cooperate on those basis. But Ilghazi and Toghtekin thought that they were not enough, and so they contacted Roger of Salerno, Regent of Antioch, and met him on the shore of Lake Qudus (modern-day Lake Homs), and there they renewed treaties and signed an allegiance. After that, Roger returned to Antioch, and Toghtekin to Damascus, while Ilghazi headed north to Diyarbakir, to gather another Turkoman army. On the road, Ilghazi camped in al-Rastan to rest, and there he began drinking alcohol, which was a habit of his, but it would leave him heavily intoxicated and unable to lead. Qayrakhan ibn Qarajah, Emir of Homs, who knew of Ilghazi's addiction took that chance and attacked Ilghazi's camp, and captured him.

Out of fear of Toghtekin and his army, Qayrakhan sent a message to Sultan Muhammed, telling him that he captured Ilghazi and asking him to send an army as quick as possible, and when Toghtekin besieged Homs, Qayrakhan threatened that he will kill Ilghazi, and so Ilghazi told his father-in-law that there was no benefit in procrastination, so Toghtekin lifted the siege. But after a long time pf waiting, the sultan's help did not come, and Qayrakhan started fearing that the garrison of Homs might betray him, and so he signed an agreement with Ilghazi, its terms were that: Ilghazi will be freed, but his son Ayaz will be taken as a hostage in his stead, the Artuqids will protect Qayrakhan from Toghtekin and any other threat, and finally a marriage between the families of the two. And thus Ilghazi was freed, but despite the agreement, he continued with his original plan, gatherd an army of Turkoman, and besieged Homs, demanding Qarajah to hand him Ayaz, but the Qarajah refused.

As for the Seljuks, after Muhammed I heard the news of Ilghazi and Toghtekin's defiance, he prepared an army, gave its leadership to Bursuq ibn Bursuq, Emir of Hamadan; he was joined by the armies of Mosul and Jazirah, and the two emirs, Juyush Beg and Konteghdi, the plan was to defeat Ilghazi and Toghtekin then attack the Crusaders. The army started its marche in February 1115, and near Raqqa they crossed the Euphrates in mid-1115. When the Seljuk campaign reached Aleppo, Bursuq commanded Lu'lu' al-Khadim, Regent of Aleppo, to handle the city, and showed him the sultans edicts and seals, but Lu'lu' stalled him while he sent messages to Ilghazi and Toghtekin asking for their help. The two acted quickly and entered the city with 2,000 cavalry, and after that, Aleppo declared defiance as well. Knowing he that Aleppo wasn't easy to fall, Bursuq instead attacked Hama, which was in Toghtekin's domains, the Seljuks besieged it and captured it, then sacked it for 3 days, then it was given to Qayrakhan, because the Sultan commanded that every captured city be given to him.

Then, Toghtekin, Ilghazi and Shams al-Khawas, commander of the Aleppo army, went to Atharib where they met Roger of Salerno, and renewed their allegiance. Baldwin I, King of Jerusalem and Pons, Count of Tripoli were gathering their armies to join them, and told Roger to not face the Seljuks until he arrives, so. the allies decided to settle in the castle of Apamea, where Bursuq tried to harass them, but after hearing about the incoming support, he retreated east. After Baldwin and Pons finally arrived after two months of waiting, the allies advanced to Shaizar and burned the lower town as punishment for aligning itself with the Seljuks. When Bursuq did not turn back to defend the town, the allied leaders assumed the campaign was over. Ilghazi returned to Mardin, Toghtekin returned to Damascus, and the Crusader lords returned to their lands.

== Aftermath ==
After the alliance scattered, Toghtekin sought peace with the sultan, and arrived to Baghdad in a great convoy, but Ilghazi didn't, but after Muhammad I died, he sent declaring obedience to his son Mahmud. Soon after the alliance scattered, Bursuq attacked the Crusaders again, and sacked Kafar Tab, but he was routed and defeated in Battle of Sarmin.
