= Battle of Sarmin =

1115 battle of the Seljuk-Crusader War

Coordinates: 35.90°N 36.72°E

- Part of Seljuk-Crusader War
Date	14 September 1115
Location	Sarmin
Result	Crusader victory

Belligerents
Principality of Antioch; County of Edessa	Seljuk Empire: Emirate of Hamadan

Commanders and leaders
Roger of Salerno, Regent of Antioch; Baldwin II, Count of Edessa	Bursuq ibn Bursuq, Emir of Hamadan; Zengi ibn Bursuq; Konteghdi

Strength
2,700; 700 cavalry; 2,000 infantry	8,000

Casualties and losses
Unknown, probably light	3,000 killed

The Battle of Sarmin, also known as the Battle of Tell Danith, took place on 14 September 1115 with Roger of Salerno's Crusader army surprising and routing the Seljuk Turkish army of Bursuq ibn Bursuq of Hamadan. It is also known as the First Battle of Tell Danith, distinguishing it from the Battle of Hab of 1119, the Second Battle of Tell Danith.

== Background ==
In November 1114, a severe earthquake struck the Principality of Antioch, damaging many of its castles. The following spring, while supervising the repair of his strongholds, Prince Roger heard rumors of a Turkish invasion. Since 1110, the Seljuk Sultan Muhammad I Tapar had directed a series of attacks on the Principality of Antioch and the County of Edessa, which were both established in 1098 in the First Crusade.

=== Seljuk campaign of 1115 ===
In 1115, Ilghazi and Toghtekin rebelled against Sultan Muhammad I Tapar. The sultan sent Bursuq ibn Bursuq to fight the Crusaders and deal with the rebells. The campaign started its marche in February 1115, and near Raqqa they crossed the Euphrates in mid-1115. When they reached Aleppo, its regent, Lu'lu' al-Yaya, declared defiance, and sought support from Ilghazi and Toghtekin, who sent him an army of 2,000 men to protect Aleppo.

Roger of Salerno, Regent of Antioch, sent spies to observe his enemy's movements, gathered provisions for his army and put his principality into a state of defense. His 2,000-man army, which included both knights and infantry, assembled at Jisr al-Hadid, a bridge over the Orontes River. He then advanced to Atharib, where Roger met, Toghtekin, Ilghazi, and Shams al-Khawas, commander of Aleppo's forces, and there they formed an alligance.

The allies moved 80 kilometers south to the walled town of Apamea (modern-day Qal'at al-Madiq). This move placed the combined army where it could maneuver to protect Aleppo, Damascus, or Antioch. Once he was certain the Turks were on the march, Roger sent a messenger to King Baldwin I of Jerusalem requesting assistance. Bursuq's army suddenly appeared and besieged Hama, a Muslim town only 30 km (19 mi) southeast of Afamiya, it was captured and sacked for 3 days. Bursuq made his camp at Shaizar, only 12 kilometers northwest of Hama.

Baldwin mobilized 500 knights and 1,000 foot soldiers from the Kingdom of Jerusalem and started north. On his way, Pons joined him with 200 knights and 2,000 infantry from the County of Tripoli to his army. He sent a message forbidding Roger from engaging the enemy before his reinforcements arrived. Bursuq's forces closed around Roger's armed camp, attempting to lure the Antiochenes and their allies into a premature attack. Bursuq's harassing attacks severely provoked them; such was the eagerness of the knights to close with their enemies that Roger threatened to put out the eyes of any man who sallied out of the camp without permission. Later, he rode through the camp with his sword drawn to emphasize his point.

When Bursuq heard of Baldwin's relieving force, he withdrew east. Counting the 5,000 followers of his Muslim allies, Baldwin's combined army may have been as large as 10,700 men. The allies advanced to Shaizar and burned the lower town as punishment for aligning itself with the Seljuks. When Bursuq did not turn back to defend the town, the allied leaders assumed the campaign was over. The Muslim emirs and the Christian lords took their followers home.

As soon as the allied host dispersed, Bursuq invaded again and captured the Christian-held town of Kafr Tab, then marched on Apamea, but was repelled, and instead attacked Maarat al-Numan, while Juyush Beg was sent in a force to capture Wadi Baza'a. Wearily, Roger recalled his army and took to the field again with 700 cavalry and 2,000 infantry. Meanwhile, Bursuq took his army in the direction of Zerdana. Roger based his army 40 km (25 mi) south of Antioch at the castle of Rugia, at a bridge on the Orontes near Jisr al-Shughur.

== The Battle ==
Early on 14 September Roger received intelligence that his opponents were going into camp at the Tell Danith watering point, near Sarmin, with their baggage and provisions going bfirst, and the soldiers following. Roger rapidly advanced, and when he arrived at the muslim camp, he found it empty because the soldiers didn't arrive yet. The Crusaders looted the camp and hid, waiting to ambush the Muslims. When the Seljuk army arrived, Roger took them by surprise, and as the Crusaders launched their attack, some Turkish soldiers were still straggling into the camp, entering in small groups and allowing the Crusaders to elimenate them easily. Roger marshalled his army into left, center, and right divisions. Baldwin, Count of Edessa, led the left wing while Roger commanded the center. The Crusaders attacked in echelon with the left wing leading. Bursuq arrived with 100 cavalry, but was broken by the left flank of the Crsader army. Bursuq had to withdraw to a hill with his brother Zengi. Non-warrior elements of the campaign sorrounded them, seeking protecrtion. Bursuq wanted to fight till the end, but his brother and whatever that was left of the Seljuk leadership forced him to retreat. On the Frankish right, the Turcopoles, who were employed as archers, were thrown back by a Seljuk counterattack. This disrupted the knights who faced tough fighting before repulsing their enemies on this part of the field. Roger decisively defeated Bursuq's army, ending the long campaign.

== Aftermath ==
The Crusaders chased Bursuq for few kilmoeteres before stopping. At least 3,000 Turks were killed and many captured, along with property worth 300,000 bezants. Crusader losses were probably light. In the spring, Bursuq's army was probably larger than the army of Roger and his muslim rebell allies. Bursuq withdrew in the face of Baldwin's advance, indicating that the King of Jerusalem may have achieved superiority in numbers, or at least parity. Bursuq's army may have dwindled as the campaign dragged on, since it is known that some of the emirs were upset with his division of the spoils. Roger mustered 2,000 in the spring, but without support from his recent Christian and Muslim allies, he may have called up a larger army for his fall campaign, perhaps 3,000 men.

Bursuq was so sadned by the defeat, that he spent the next year getting ready for another campaign, but he died in 1116. Roger's victory preserved the Crusader hold on Antioch. But four years later, Roger was to lose his life and his army at the Battle of Ager Sanguinis.
