= List of Seljuk rulers in Syria (1076–1117) =

This is a list of Seljuk rulers in Syria (1076–1117).

== Aleppo ==
- Abu Sa'id Taj ad–Dawla Tutush I, 1085–1086
- Jalal ad–Dawlah Malik-Shah I, 1086–1087
- Qasim ad–Dawla Abu Said Aq Sunqur al-Hajib, 1087–1094
- Abu Sa'id Taj ad–Dawla Tutush I (second time), 1094–1095
- Fakhr al-Mulk Radwan, 1095–1113
- Tadj ad–Dawla Alp Arslan al-Akhras, 1113–1114
  - Lu'lu' al-Yaya, regent as atabeg
- Sultan Shah ibn Ridwan, 1114–1123
  - Lu'lu' al-Yaya, 1114–1117, regent as atabeg
  - Shams al-Khawass Yaruqtash, 1117, regent as atabeg
  - Abu'l–Ma'ali ibn al-Malahi al-Dimashqi, 1117, regent as atabeg.

To the Artuqids under Ilghazi.

== Damascus ==
- Atsiz ibn Abaq, 1076–1079
- Abu Sa'id Taj ad–Dawla Tutush I, 1079–1095
- Abu Nasr Shams al-Muluk Duqaq, 1095–1104
- Tutush II, son of Duqaq, 1104
- Muhi ad–Din Baqtash, son of Tutush I, 1104.

Damascus seized by Toghtekin.
