= Battle of the Field of Blood =

Battle in the Middle East in 1119

Coordinates: 36°10′44″N 36°43′10″E

Battle of Ager Sanguinis
- Part of Seljuk-Crusader War
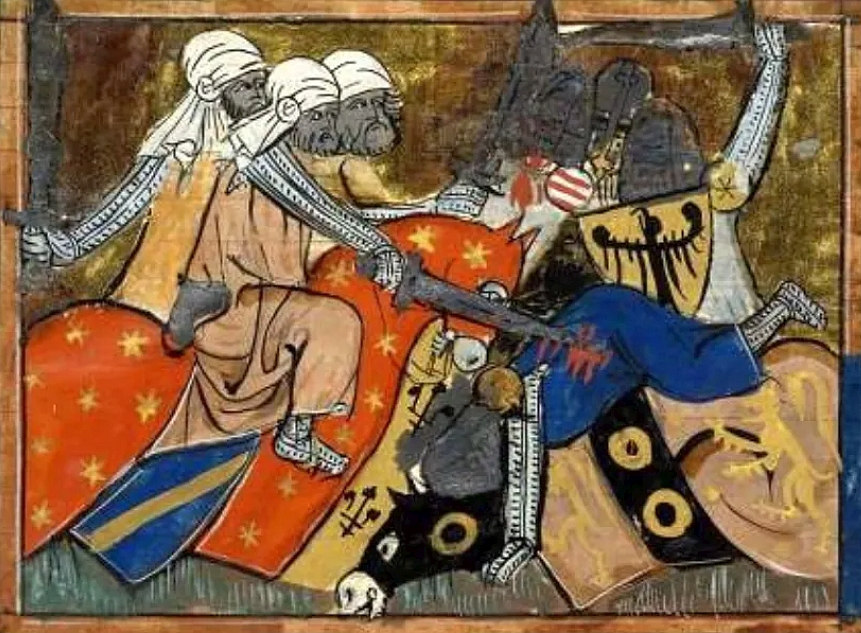
- A miniature from 1337, depicting Battle of Ager Sanguinis
Date	28 June 1119
Location	Balat, near Sarmada (Note: The location of the battle was described by contemporary historians, as follows: Matthew of Edessa: "After that he went to Buzaa and set up camp here" or "within the fortress of al-Atarib".; Ibn al-Adim: "Roger is located in al-Balat, between two mountains, near the Sarmada mountain pass, north of al-Atarib."; Ibn al-Qalanisi: "in a place known as Sarmada, while others said that in Danit al-Bakal, between Antioch and Aleppo."; Usama ibn Munqidh: "at al-Balat" or "at Badanis".; Fulcher of Chartres: "Roger ... fell dead near fort Artasia.")
Result	Artuqid victory

Belligerents
Artuqids of Mardin and Aleppo	Principality of Antioch

Commanders and leaders
Ilghazi, Emir of Mardin and Aleppo; Ibn al-Khashshab	Roger of Salerno †

Strength
20,000	7,000–11,000 • 700 knights • 500 Armenian cavalry • 3,000 infantry • Turcopoles and auxiliaries

Casualties and losses
Unknown, possibly heavy	Most killed 570 captured, of whom 30 executed

Battle of the Field of Blood, also known in Latin as Battle of Ager Sanguinis, and in Arabic as Battle of al-Balat, was a battle where Roger of Salerno's Crusader army of the Principality of Antioch was annihilated by the army of Ilghazi of Mardin, the Artuqid ruler of Aleppo on 28 June 1119.

== Background ==
The Principality of Antioch and the other Crusader states were constantly at war with the Muslim states of northern Syria and al-Jazira, principally Aleppo and Mosul. When Ridwan of Aleppo died in 1113, there was a period of peace, at least for a few years. However, Roger of Salerno, who was ruling Antioch as regent for Bohemond II, did not take advantage of Ridwan's death; likewise, Baldwin II, Count of Edessa, and Pons, Count of Tripoli, looked after their own interests and did not ally with Roger against Aleppo. In 1115 Roger defeated a Seljuk invasion force led by Bursuq ibn Bursuq at the Battle of Sarmin.

In 1117, Aleppo came under the rule of the Ilghazi, Artuqid Emir of Mardin, who made an alligance with Toghtekin, Emir of Damascus, then signed a truce with Antioch, and left to bring an army from Mardin, and sent a message to Sultan Mahmud II, seeking his help. In 1118 Roger captured Azaz and Biza'a, which left Aleppo open to attack from the Crusaders; Aleppo was so weak to resist. Ilghazi gatherd an army of 20,000 men, he was joined by Usama ibn al-Mubarak ibn Shibk al-Kilabi and Shams al-Dawla Toghan Arslan ibn al-Makr, Bey of Dilmaç, and marched to Levant. Roger marched out from Artah with Bernard of Valence, the Latin Patriarch of Antioch. Bernard suggested they remain there, as Artah was a well-defended fortress only a short distance away from Antioch, and Ilghazi would not be able to pass if they were stationed there. Bernard also advised Roger to call for help from Pons and Baldwin, who had become the king of Jerusalem, but Roger felt he could not wait for them to arrive.

Roger camped in the pass of Tell Afrin, while Ilghazi besieged the fort of al-Atharib. A force under Robert of Vieux-Pont set out to break the siege, and Ilghazi feigned a retreat, Robert's men were drawn out from the fort and ambushed.

== Battle ==
Ilghazi was waiting for reinforcements from Toghtekin, but he too was tired of waiting. Using three paths that were little-used, his army quickly surrounded Roger's camp during the night of 27 June. Roger had recklessly chosen a campsite in a wooded valley with steep sides and few avenues of escape. Roger's army of 700 knights, 500 Armenian cavalry and 3,000 foot soldiers, including turcopoles, hastily formed into five divisions. These drew up in a V-shaped line with the tip farthest from the Muslim battle array. From left to right, the divisions were commanded by Robert of St. Lo, Roger, Guy de Frenelle, Geoffrey the Monk and Peter. Meanwhile, Roger held back a sixth division under Rainald I Masoir to protect the rear.

As the Muslim army waited, the qadi Abu al-Fadl ibn al-Khashshab, wearing his lawyer's turban but brandishing a lance, rode out in front of the troops. At first they were incredulous at being harangued by a scholar, but at the end of his passionate evocation of the duties and merits of the jihad warrior, according to contemporary historian Kamal ad-Din, these hardened professionals wept with emotion and rode into battle.

On the morning of 28 June the battle was begun by an archery duel between the Antiochene infantry, posted in front of the knights, and the Turkish bowmen. The Crusader army was at first successful when the right-hand divisions of Peter and Geoffrey attacked and defeated the Artuqids opposed to them. Guy de Frenelle's center division had some success also, but the battle was soon decided on the left flank. Robert of St. Lo and the turcopoles were driven back into Roger's division, disrupting it. A north wind blew dust in the faces of the Antioch knights and footmen, confusing them further. Soon, Artuqid flanking forces enveloped the Crusaders.

During the fighting, Roger was killed by a sword in the face at the foot of the great jewelled cross which had served as his standard. The rest of the army was killed or captured; only two knights survived. Renaud took refuge in the fort of Sarmada to wait for Baldwin but was later taken captive by Ilghazi. Among the other prisoners was likely Walter the Chancellor, who later wrote an account of the battle. The massacre led to the name of the battle, ager sanguinis, Latin for "the field of blood."

The Muslims captured 70 knights and 500 soldiers of inferior rank. The high-ranking prisoners were ransomed, and 30 who could not pay their way out were executed.

== Aftermath ==
Ilghazi did not advance to Antioch, where Bernard was organizing a defense. Even so, because of the loss of the Antiochene field army, Atharib, Zerdana, Sarmin, Ma'arrat al-Numan and Kafr Tab rapidly fell into Muslim hands.

Ilghazi was defeated by Baldwin and Pons at the Battle of Hab on 14 August, and Baldwin took over the regency of Antioch. Subsequently, Baldwin recovered some of the lost towns. Even so, the defeat at the Field of Blood left Antioch severely weakened and subject to repeated attacks by the Muslims in the following decade. Eventually, the principality came under the influence of a resurgent Byzantine Empire. The Crusaders regained some of their influence in Syria at the Battle of Azaz six years later in 1125.

== Bibliography ==
- Thomas S. Asbridge and Susan B. Edgington, trans. & eds. Walter the Chancellor's The Antiochene Wars: a translation and commentary. Aldershot: Ashgate, 1999. ISBN 1-84014-263-4 (Appendices also contain the accounts of Fulcher of Chartres, Albert of Aix, Matthew of Edessa, Orderic Vitalis, and William of Tyre.)
- Geoffrey Hindley, The Crusades: a history of armed pilgrimage and holy war. London: Constable, 2003 ISBN 1-84119-597-9
- Runciman, Steven (1952). A History of the Crusades, Volume II: The Kingdom of Jerusalem and the Frankish East. Vol. 2. Cambridge: Cambridge University Press.
- Smail, R. C. (1995). Crusading Warfare 1097–1193 (2 ed.). Cambridge University Press. ISBN 0-521-48029-9.
- Stevenson, W (1907). The Crusaders in the East: a brief history of the wars of Islam with the Latins in Syria during the twelfth and thirteenth centuries. Cambridge University Press.
- Tibble, Steve (2018). The Crusader Armies 1099–1187. New Haven and London: Yale University Press. ISBN 978-0-300-21814-5.
