= Amina Khatun =

De facto ruler of Aleppo in 1117

Amina Khatun (fl. 1117) was de facto ruler of Aleppo in 1117.

She was born to Fakhr al-Mulk Ridwan, Amir of Aleppo (r. 1095–1113). Her father was succeeded by her brother Alp Arslan al-Akhras under regency of Lu'lu' al-Yaya. Her brother was deposed in 1114 by Lu'lu' al-Yaya, who replaced him with her six-year-old younger brother Sulṭān Shāh.

In 1117, Lu'lu' al-Yaya died, and Amina Khatun seized effective control of Aleppo. She did not proclaim herself as regent, but she called upon the commander Yaruqtash in Damascus to come and assume the regency in Aleppo on behalf of her brother. When Yaruqtash tried to assume direct control and depose Sultan Shah, she had him arrested and exiled. Together with her sister Farkhinda Khatun, she installed Ilghazi as the new commander and regent and, eventually, as the successor of her brother. Her position as de facto keeper of the citadel and regency of Aleppo was unique for a woman in a Muslim state of her time.
