= Husam al-Din Timurtash =

Artuqid emir of Mardin

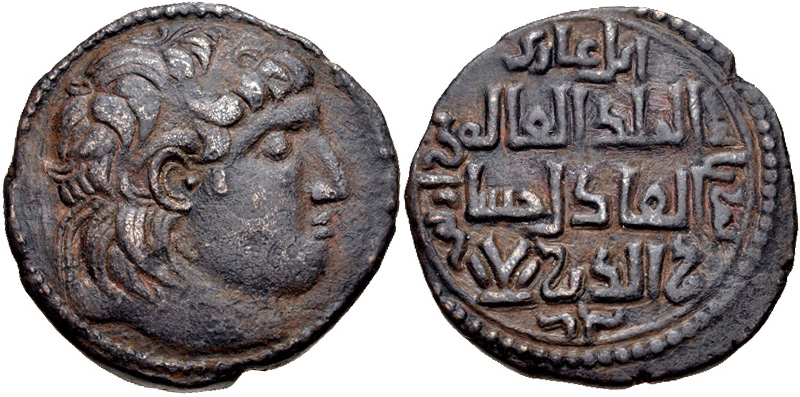
Coinage of Husam al-Din Timurtash. Diademed, Seleucid-style bust right. Name and titles of Timurtash in four lines and in margins.

Husam al-Din Timurtash (Old Anatolian Turkish: حسام الدين تيمورتاش; Turkish: Hüsameddin Timurtaş; c. 1105 – 1154) was an Artuqid emir of Mardin (1122–1154) and ruler of Aleppo (1124–1125).

== Biography ==
=== Early career ===
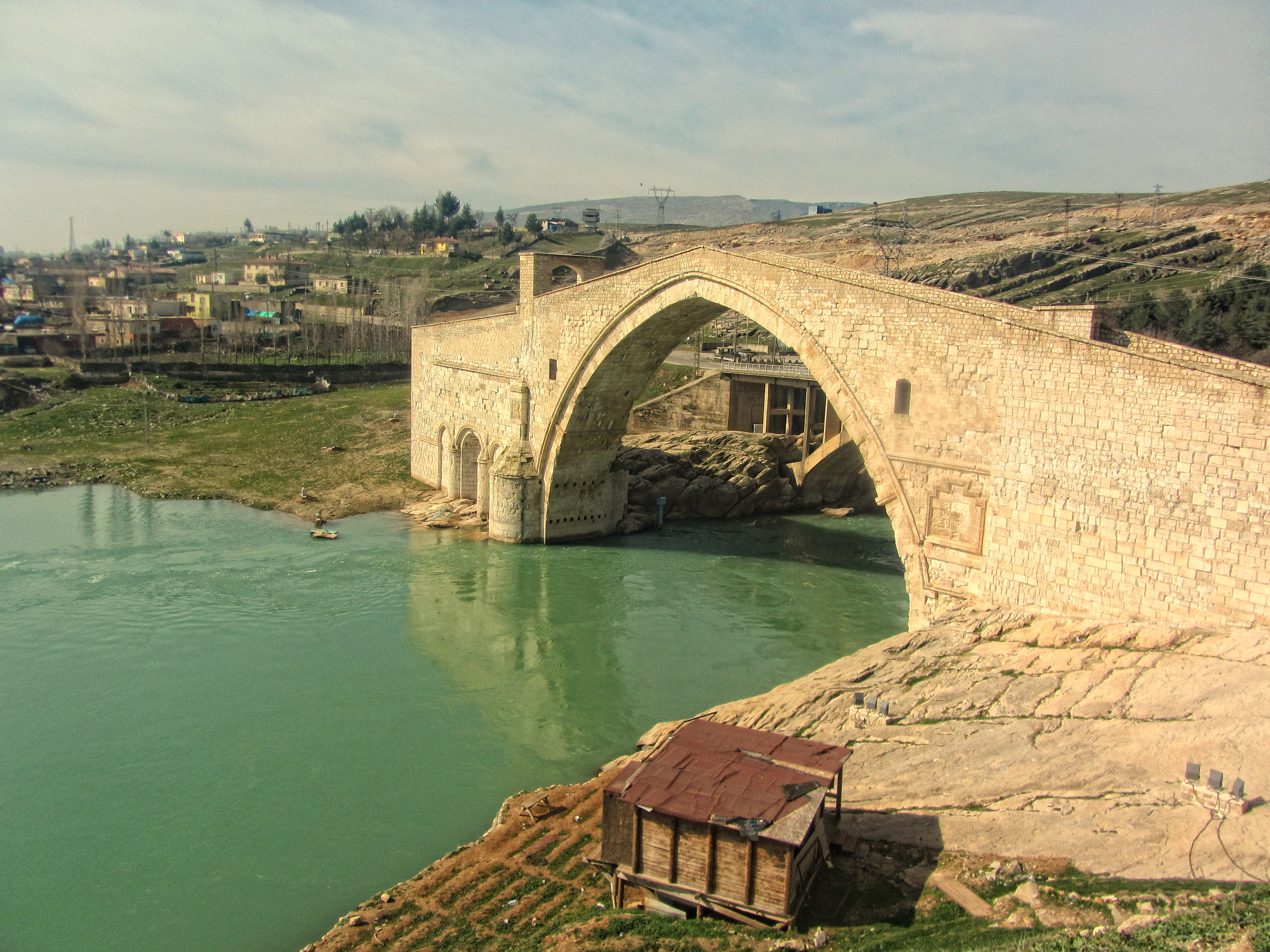
The historic Malabadi Bridge was built by Husam al-Din Timurtash.

The main sources of his reign were the chronicle of Ibn al-Azraq al-Fariqi and Ibn al-Athir, in addition to Michael the Syrian, Ibn al-Furat, Al-Azimi, and Ibn al-Adim.

His first task, still very young, was in 1111/12, when he was sent as ambassador to the Seljuk sultan Muhammad I Tapar to intercede for the fate of Dubays ibn Sadaqa. He then accompanied his father, Ilghazi, to Aleppo in 1118 and remained in the city temporarily as governor while his father went to Mardin to seek reinforcements.

On the death of his father in 1122, on his way to Mayyafariqin, Timurtash had the government of Mardin, while his brother Shams al-Dawla Suleiman became ruler of Mayyafariqin. When his cousin Belek Ghazi died during the siege of Manbij on 6 May 1124, Timurtash, who had accompanied him, took his dead body back to Aleppo on the next day, hence he became the ruler of the city.

Timurtash decided to free Baldwin II of Jerusalem, whom Belek had taken prisoner. Timurtash entrusted Sultan, the emir of Shaizar, with commencing negotiations for Baldwin's release with his family. According to their agreement, Baldwin was to pay 80,000 dinars and to cede Atarib, Zardana, Azaz and other Antiochene fortresses to Timurtash. Baldwin also promised that he would assist Timurtash against the Bedouin warlord, Dubays ibn Sadaqa. After a quarter of Baldwin's ransom was paid and a dozen hostages (including Baldwin's youngest daughter Ioveta and Joscelin II) were handed over to Timurtash to secure the payment of the balance, Baldwin was released on 29 August 1124.

However, Timurtash was later defeated on the outskirts of Aleppo by forces loyal to the local Seljuk Sultan-Shah, and emir Dubays ibn Sadaqa, now allies of the Crusaders. Timurtash, with very little support, (Note: Even his cousin, Badr al-Dawla Suleiman, who had been governor of Aleppo from 1122 to 1123, and who felt humiliated for being removed from office by Belek, did not side with him.) fled in August 1124 to Mardin, while in Aleppo the local qadi Ibn al-Khashshab came to power nominally in the name of Timurtash.

Timurtash asked for help from his brother Suleiman of Mayyafariqin in September 1124, but the two brothers did not get along and Aleppo was left to its own fate. Suleiman died in Mayyafariqin, late 1124 or late 1130, and Timurtash was recognized in that city.

In 1125, the qadi of Aleppo sent an embassy demanding Timurtash's return during the Siege of Aleppo, but he imprisoned the ambassadors, apparently irritated by their complaints. They escaped and then the embassy went to Aqsunqur al-Bursuqi, the atabeg of Mosul, who was offered the government, which he soon took possession of and ruled for a time until he was assassinated by the Order of Assassins in November 1126.

=== Interactions with Zengi ===
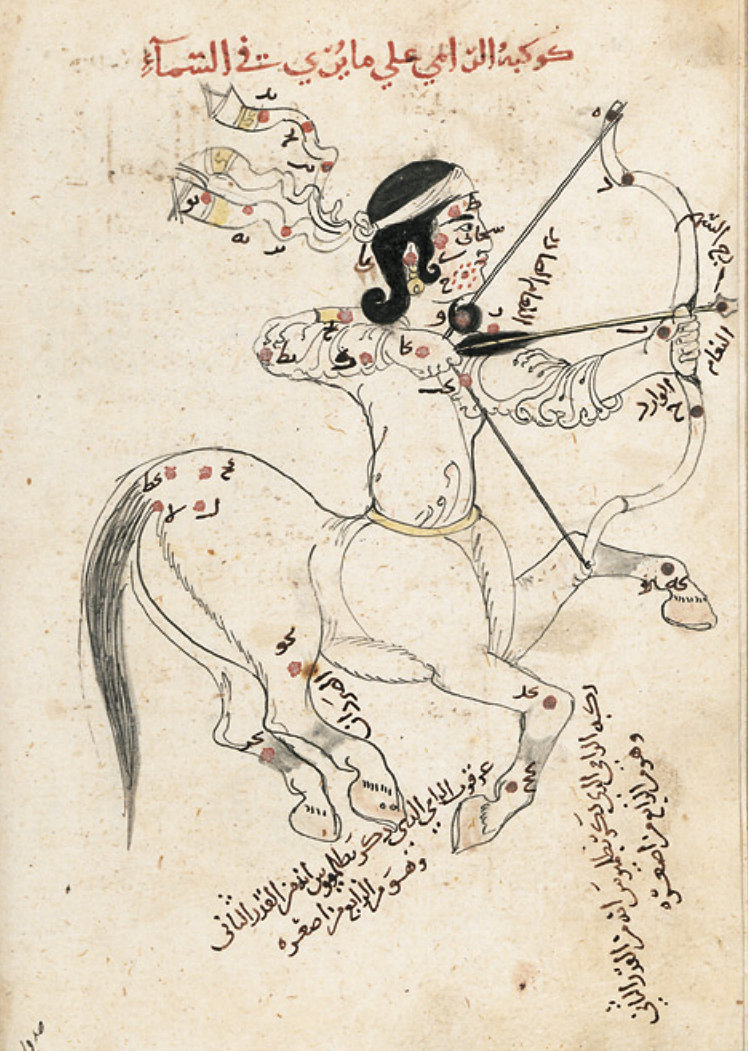
“Sign of Sagittarius” by al-Sufi in his book Ṣuwar al-kawākib al-thābita, Artuqid Mardin, 1131 CE.

When Imad al-Din Zengi became the atabeg of Mosul, he laid siege to Nusaybin, which belonged to Timurtash, who asked for help from his cousin Rukn al-Dawla Da'ud, and promised him to rule the city. Zengi intercepted a messenger pigeon sent by Timurtash to the governor of Nusaybin, and replaced the message by getting the garrison to surrender to his forces. This success of Zengi, followed in 1128 by the conquest of Aleppo, forced the Artuqid emirs to ally with each other and with other Turkmen emirs.

In 1130, an alliance was signed with Ilaldi, the ruler of Amida, and other Turkmen chiefs against Zengi; but the combined army was defeated by Zengi at Saruj, and the atabeg occupied the city along with Dara. The alliance with Timurtash came to an end and each of them again dealt with his internal affairs, with Timurtash accepting Zengi's hegemony.

In 1134, Zengi became involved in Artuqid affairs, allying with Timurtash against his cousin Da'ud, in which they clashed with Da'ud on the outskirts of Amida, and Da'ud was defeated; Zengi occupied al-Sur fortress which he handed over to Timurtash along with other smaller sites. Once Zengi left Amida, Da'ud, angry at the lost territories, launched a campaign against his cousin which forced him to demolish the suburbs of Mayyafariqin, as he thought that he could not maintain these parts against the depredations of his rival.

After 1136, Timurtash distanced himself from Zengi. In 1136/37, he conquered Hattakh, the last Marwanid fortress in Amida; then some members of the Marwanite family appeared in his service. In 1138/39, the Zengid governor of Nusaybin, Abu-Bakr, who was threatened by Zengi fled to the principality of Timurtash and sought asylum. Zengi demanded the surrender of the fugitive and Timurtash refused. Then the atabeg went to Mardin and Timurtash only got away by giving him Dara and his daughter for marriage; hence, according to Ibn al-Azraq, he avoided the surrender of Abu Bakr.

In 1141/42, he reached an agreement with his cousin Rukn al-Dawla Da'ud. In the meantime, Zengi asked Timurtash to send a commander named Habashi, a request for unknown reasons, which ended with Habashi's assassination in Zengi's camp. It seemed that the Emir of Mardin was seeking an alliance with Da'ud and Joscelin II, Count of Edessa which was opposed by Zengi. Other reasons for the conflict were known, as according to Ibn al-Athir, a large group of peasants left Mosul to settle in Mardin; Zengi asked for their return but Timurtash refused and said that he only charged them a tenth of the harvest, and that if Zengi had done the same they would not have left. Zengi argued that without his assistance, Timurtash would not avoid the conquest of the city by the Crusaders; which urged him eventually to return the peasants.

In 1144, his cousin Rukn al-Dawla Da'ud died, and Zengi seized almost all of his territories between Hasankeyf and Harput. The attempt to ally Kara Arslan, Da'ud's son and successor, with Timurtash and the Count of Edessa ended with Zengi's conquest of the county capital. In 1145/46, Zengi advanced against Mayyafariqin but withdrew, as it was probably nothing more than a show of strength. The assassination of Zengi in Qal'at Ja'bar in 1146 settled the matter.

Immediately upon learning of the atabeg's death, Timurtash went out with his Turkmen and occupied some territories such as Hani and Siwan before Zengi's successor in Mosul, his son Sayf al-Din Ghazi I, could establish his power. Timurtash occupied Siirt in 1146 then handed it over a year later to Kara Arslan.

=== Later years ===
In 1148/49, Timurtash suffered a serious defeat against Saif al-Din Ghazi of Mosul who reached as far as Mardin with the intention of reclaiming all the territories of his father; before achieving anything decisive he died in 1149 in Mosul. Shortly afterwards the Emir of Amida, Kara Arslan, recognized the sovereignty of the Emir of Mardin, then around 1150 he conquered Samsat when the Count of Edessa, Joscelin II, was taken prisoner by Nur al-Din. Shortly before his death, Timurtash received in 1152 from the Caliph, Al-Muqtafi, dresses and diplomas accrediting the Caliphate's recognition of his possessions. In the same year he made an attack on the crusaders at Jerusalem but was defeated.

He died in 1154, and was succeeded by his son Najm al-Din Alpi.

== See also ==
- Malabadi Bridge

== Sources ==
- Ibn al-Azraq al-Fariqi (1979). Carole Hillenbrand (ed.). The History of the Jazira 1100–1150: The Contribution of Ibn al-Azraq al-Fariqi. Vol. 2. University of Edinburgh.
- Köhler, Michael (2013). Alliances and Treaties between Frankish and Muslim Rulers in the Middle East: Cross-Cultural Diplomacy in the Period of the Crusades. BRILL. ISBN 978-90-04-24857-1.
- Lock, Peter (2006). The Routledge Companion to the Crusades. Routledge. ISBN 9-78-0-415-39312-6.
- Richards, D. S. (2010). The Chronicle of Ibn Al-Athir for the Crusading Period from Al-Kamil Fi'L-Ta'Rikh.: The Years 491-541/1097-1146 the Coming of the Franks and the Muslim Response. Ashgate Publishing, Ltd. ISBN 9780754669500.
- Runciman, Steven (1989). A History of the Crusades, Volume II: The Kingdom of Jerusalem and the Frankish East, 1100-1187. Cambridge University Press. ISBN 978-0-521-06162-9.
- Maalouf, Amin (1983). The Crusades Through Arab Eyes. JC Lattes. ISBN 0-8052-0898-4.
