= Rukn al-Dawla Da'ud =

Early 12th century Turkish Bey

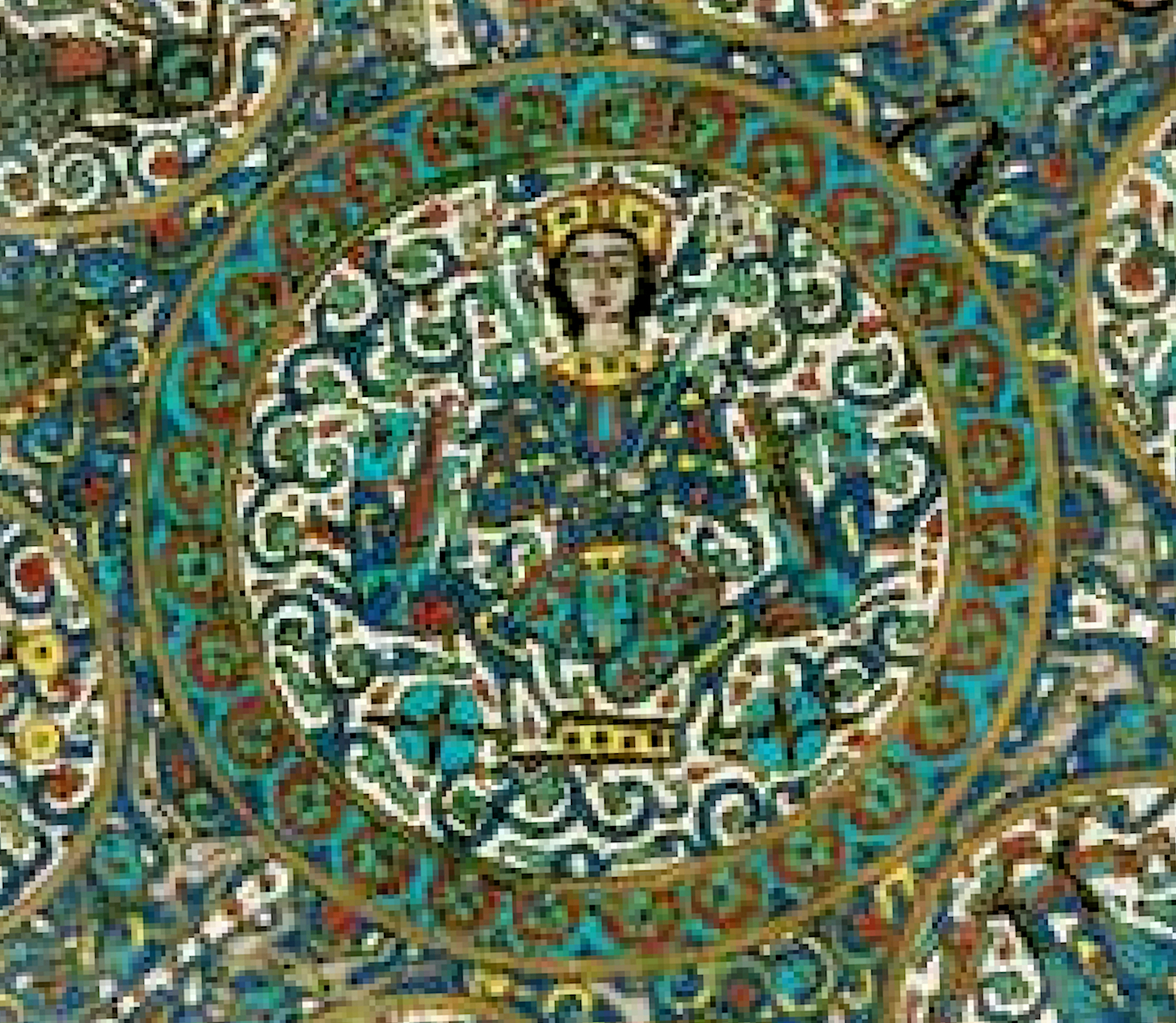
- Depiction of Alexander the Great in the Rukn al-Dawla Da'ud plate medallion (1114–44).
- In office 1114–1144
- Preceded by: Ibrahim of Ḥiṣn Kaifā

Bey of Artukids
- Succeeded by: Kara Arslan

Personal details
- Born: unknown
- Died: 1144

Military service
- Allegiance: Seljuq Empire

Rukn al-Dawla Da'ud (ruled 1114–1144 CE) was a Turkoman emir of the Artuqid dynasty in the early 12th century. He was a son of Sökmen and succeeded his brother Ibrahim of Ḥiṣn Kaifā (ruled 1104–1109).

== Origin ==
His grandfather was Artuk Bey, a commander in the Seljuk Empire. He was ruler of Hisn Kayfa, a city on the Tigris River in the northern Jazira region (modern Turkey).

== Rule ==
After the passing of his brother, Ibrahim, Da'ud ascended as bey of Hisn Kayfa in 1109. Despite his position, he consistently acknowledged the authority of his uncle Ilghazi, even dispatching soldiers to him on multiple occasions. However, in 1122, he refused to yield the same deference to Husam al-Din Timurtash. Seizing the opportunity presented by Belek Ghazi's demise in 1124, Da'ud swiftly captured Harput. Yet, his ambition to control Mayyafariqin was delayed, leading to a rivalry with his cousin Timurtash. Ibn al-Athir noted the loyalty of the Turkmen of Amida to Da'ud over Timurtash, although they recognized Timurtash's tactical prowess.

Between 1123 and 1125, Da'ud joined the ruler of Ahlat in a campaign against the Kingdom of Georgia, according to Matthew of Edessa. In 1126, when Imad al-Din Zengi besieged Nusaybin, he sought Da'ud's assistance, eventually promising him the city. Zengi's cunning interception of a messenger pigeon led to the surrender of Nusaybin to his forces, enhancing his power. Subsequent victories, including the conquest of Aleppo in 1128/1129, compelled the Artuqid emirs to unite with other Turkmen leaders.

In 1130, Da'ud forged an alliance with Ilaldi, the ruler of Amida, and other Turkmen chiefs against Zengi, but their combined forces suffered defeat against the Atabeg in Saruj, who later managed to extend his influence over the region including Dara. The alliance with Timurtash dissolved, leading to a focus on internal affairs, with Timurtash acknowledging Zengi's dominance.

In 1131, Da'ud expanded his control by occupying several fortresses south of Lake Van, including Qatalbas and Batasa, and the city of Siirt. However, in 1134, he faced defeat against Timurtash and Zengi near Amida. Da'ud's subsequent campaign against Timurtash compelled the demolition of Mayyafariqin's suburbs due to the inability to defend them against rival incursions. In 1141/1142, an agreement was brokered between Da'ud, Timurtash, and the County of Edessa, which Zengi opposed.

Da'ud died in 1144, succeeded by his son Kara Arslan.

== Plate of Rukn al-Dawla Dawu ==
A famous decorated plate in Byzantine style was dedicated to Rukn al-Dawla Dawu, with the following mention:

The amir, the great general, the God-aided, the victorious, Nasir al-Din, Rukn al-Dawla, protector of the faith, magnificence of the umma (nation), general of the armies, crown of kings and sultans, killer of the infidels and polytheists, Alp Sevinç Sunqur Beg Ata(?) Sulayman. Dawud(?) b. Artuq Sayf amir al-Mu’minin.

— Dedicated of the Plate of Rukn al-Dawla Dawu.

The plate was probably a royal gift for Rukn al-Dawla Dawud, from Christian Byzantium, or Georgia, or another region under Byzantine cultural influence.

== Sources ==
- Bosworth, Clifford Edmund (2004). The new Islamic dynasties: a chronological and genealogical manual. Edinburgh University Press. ISBN 978-0-7486-2137-8.
- Ibn al-Azraq al-Fariqi (1979). Carole Hillenbrand (ed.). The History of the Jazira 1100–1150: The Contribution of Ibn al-Azraq al-Fariqi. Vol. 2. University of Edinburgh.
- Yücel, Yaşar; Sevim, Ali (1990). Türkiye Tarihi Cilt I. Ankara: AKDTYK Yayınları.
- Nicolle, David (2003). Birinci Haçlı seferi 1996-1999. İstanbul: Türkiye İş Bankası Yayınları. ISBN 978-605-360-245-3.
- Güray Kırpık. "Artuklu Haçlı Münasebetleri (1098-1124)" (PDF). Gazi University.
- Canby, Sheila R.; Beyazit, Deniz; Rugiadi, Martina; Peacock, A. C. S. (27 April 2016). Court and Cosmos: The Great Age of the Seljuqs. Metropolitan Museum of Art. ISBN 978-1-58839-589-4.
