= Alp Arslan al-Akhras =

Sultan of Aleppo from 1113 to 1114

Tāj al-Dawla Alp Arslān ibn Riḍwān

Sultan of Aleppo
- Reign: 1113–1114
- Coronation: 10 December 1113
- Predecessor: Fakhr al-Mulk Ridwan
- Successor: Sultan Shah ibn Radwan
- Regent: Lu'lu' al-Yaya
- Born: Alp Arslān ibn Riḍwān

Tāj al-Dawla Alp Arslān ibn Riḍwān, nicknamed al-Akhras ('The Mute'), was the Seljuk sultan of Aleppo from 1113 until his death in 1114. According to Ibn al-Athīr, he was not actually mute but had only a speech impediment and a stammer. He was the son of the Sultan Riḍwān by a daughter of Yağısıyan, governor of Antioch.

Alp Arslān was only sixteen years old when he succeeded his father as sultan of Aleppo on 10 December 1113. As a result, according to Ibn al-Athīr, he "had only the semblance of authority as sultan, while" his atabeg Luʾluʾ al-Yaya "had the reality". After coming to power, he ordered the death of his full brother Malikshāh and his paternal half-brother Mubārakshah in imitation of his father, who had also ordered the death of his brothers upon coming to power. Historian Amin Maalouf wrote that Alp Arslan, in addition to his brothers, executed "several officers, a few servants, and in general anyone to whom he took a dislike".

While Luʾluʾ had control over the army, the aḥdāth ('local militia') remained loyal to Alp Arslān and under his control. At the suggestion of Sāʿid ibn Badīʿ, raʾīs ('leader') of the aḥdāth, Alp Arslān persecuted the Nizārī Bāṭiniyya, executing their leader, Abū Ṭāhir al-Sāʾigh, and confiscating the properties of the rest. In this way he drove many Nizārīs over to the Christian Principality of Antioch. He later turned on Ibn Badīʿ, confiscating his property and exiling him to the ʿUqaylid emirate of Qalʿat Jaʿbar. He replaced him as raʾīs of the aḥdāth by a foreigner, Ibrāhīm al-Furātī.

Because of his military weakness, Alp Arslān was forced to pay tribute to Antioch. In March 1114, Alp Arslān turned to Ṭughtegin of Damascus for protection against Antioch, against the Nizārīs and against his atabeg, Luʾluʾ. Ṭughtegin sent forces to Aleppo, but they found the official toleration of the Shia unacceptable and left before the end of the year. Roger of Salerno, regent of Antioch, forced the resumption of tribute. With Ṭughtegin's forces gone, the atabeg, in league with Shams al-Khawāṣṣ Yārūqtāsh, the lord of Rafanīya, whom Ṭughtegin had deposed, had the mamlūks murder Alp Arslān in the citadel. Luʾluʾ then placed Alp Arslān's six-year-old brother, Sulṭān Shāh, on the throne. When Luʾluʾ died in 1117, princess Āmina Khātūn took de facto control of the city.

== Sources ==
- Amabe, Fukuzo (2016). Urban Autonomy in Medieval Islam: Damascus, Aleppo, Cordoba, Toledo, Valencia and Tunis. Brill.
- Ayalon, David (1999). Eunuchs, Caliphs and Sultans: A Study in Power Relationships. Jerusalem: Magnes Press, The Hebrew University. ISBN 978-9-6549-3017-8.
- Cahen, Claude (1940). La Syrie du nord à l'époque des croisades et la principauté franque d'Antioche. P. Geuthner.
- El-Azhari, Taef Kamal (1997). The Saljūqs of Syria During the Crusades, 463–549 A.H./1070–1154 A.D. Klaus Schwarz.
- El-Azhari, Taef (2019). Queens, Eunuchs and Concubines in Islamic History, 661–1257. Edinburgh University Press.
- Maalouf, Amin (1983). The Crusades Through Arab Eyes. JC Lattes. ISBN 0-8052-0898-4.
- Richards, D. S., ed. (2007). The Chronicle of Ibn al-Athīr for the Crusading Period from Al-Kāmil Fī'l-ta'rīkh, Part 2: The Years 491–541/1097–1146, The Coming of the Franks and the Muslim Response. Ashgate. ISBN 978-0-7546-4078-3.
