= Sultan Shah ibn Radwan =

Sultan of Aleppo from 1114 to 1118

- Emir

Sultan of Aleppo
- Reign: 1114 — 1118
- Coronation: September 1114, Aleppo
- Predecessor: Alp Arslan al-Akhras
- Successor: Ilghazi (as Artuqid Emir)
- Regent: Lu'lu' al-Yaya (until 1117)
- Born: Sultan Shah ibn Radwan; 1108; Aleppo, Seljuk Sultanate
- Died: after 1124/25
- Father: Fakhr al-Mulk Ridwan
- Religion: Sunni Islam

Sultan Shah ibn Radwan (c. 1108 – after 1124/25) was the last Seljuk sultan of Aleppo from 1114 to 1118, son of Ridwan, Emir of Aleppo.

== Biography ==
Sultan Shah was born in about 1108, to Ridwan, Emir of Aleppo from 1095 to 1113, and one of his wives. His older brother Alp Arslan succeeded their father in 1113, executing two of their brothers. It is unclear why six-year-old Sultan Shah escaped the massacre. Alp Arslan quickly presented the characteristics of a bloodthirsty, mad and debauched tyrant, only his eunuch Lu'lu' al-Yaya still dared to approach him, but fearing for his life, he murdered Alp Arslan in his sleep in September 1114. In order to retain power, Lu'lu' placed Alp Arslan's younger brother, Sultan Shah, on the throne.

However, the situation with the crusaders was dire, as Roger of Salerno, regent of Antioch, demanded a tax from Aleppo on each Muslim pilgrim going to Mecca, which pushed the Alepine population to the limit, in addition Lu'lu' was assassinated by the soldiers of his escort in April 1117. The qadi of the city, Ibn al-Khashshab, aware that Aleppo was under constant threat from the Franks, explained to the notables that the security of Aleppo was permanently compromised, hence he proposed that they entrust the city to a capable Turcoman leader, Ilghazi. The latter advanced to take possession of the city during the summer of 1118 and married a daughter of Ridwan, meanwhile Sultan Shah went into exile.

Sultan Shah was mentioned for the last time in 1124. Ilghazi was succeeded by his nephew Belek Ghazi, who wanted to spearhead the Muslim reconquest, but whose ambitions worried the other Syrian emirs, then Timurtash, son of Ilghazi. The Syrian emirs wanted to permanently eliminate the danger posed by Aleppo and formed a coalition with King Baldwin II of Jerusalem, in which they besieged Aleppo. Sultan Shah participated in this siege, hoping to recover his throne. However, the natives rejected Timurtash, who lost interest in the fight against the Franks and settled in Mardin, abandoning Aleppo, as he found that there were too many wars against the Franks, according to Ibn al-Athir, and offered the city to the atabeg of Mosul, Aqsunqur al-Bursuqi.

Upon hearing of al-Bursuqi's arrival, the attackers lifted the siege on 25 January 1125. Therefore, the Seljuks' rule over Aleppo came to an end.

== Bibliography ==
- Grousset, René (1934). History of the Crusades and the Frankish Kingdom of Jerusalem. Paris: Perrin.
- Maalouf, Amin (1983). The Crusades seen by the Arabs. ISBN 978-2-290-11916-7.
