= Lu'lu' al-Yaya =

Regent of Aleppo from 1113 to 1117

Luʾluʾ al-Yaya, also called al-Bābā or al-Khādim ("the Eunuch"), was the regent of the Seljuk sultanate of Aleppo from AD 1113 (AH 507) until his assassination in 1117 (510). He was the atabeg (father-lord) of the underage sultans. Previously, he had been a eunuch in the service of Aqsunqur al-Bursuqī, the atabeg of Mosul.

According to Ibn al-Athīr, Luʾluʾ took charge of affairs in Aleppo after the death of Sultan Riḍwān in 1113, since his son, Alp Arslān al-Akhras, was only sixteen years old. In 1114, Alp Arslān was murdered in his own palace by his mamlūks at the instigation of Luʾluʾ because the young sultan had sought the help of Ṭughtakīn, ruler of Damascus, to establish his personal rule. Luʾluʾ then raised Alp Arslān's six-year-old brother, Sulṭān Shāh ibn Riḍwān, to the throne and continued to hold the regency. In an effort to solidify his rule, he founded the first khānaqāh (Ṣūfī monastery) in Aleppo, but this generated strong Shia opposition. He was also opposed by the family of Sāʿid ibn Badīʿ, raʾīs (leader) of the aḥdāth (militia), whom Alp Arslān had exiled to Qalʿat Jaʿbar.

In early 1115, threatened by his fellow Seljuk vassals, Ṭughtakīn and Īlghāzī of Mardin, Luʾluʾ requested assistance from the Great Seljuk sultan Muḥammad I Tapar in Baghdad. According to Ibn al-Athīr, the sultan sent the Emir Bursuq ibn Bursuq to deal first with the rebels and then with the neighbouring Frankish states. Part of Bursuq's mission was to take charge of Aleppo. When the emir ordered Luʾluʾ to surrender the city, the regent instead sent for help from his erstwhile enemies, Īlghāzī and Ṭughtakīn. Reinforcements of 2,000 cavalry entered the city, and Luʾluʾ went into open defiance of the Great Seljuk sultan. According to Ibn al-ʿAdīm, Luʾluʾ even passed along intelligence on Bursuq's movements to the Frankish leader Roger of Salerno, who defeated Bursuq at the Battle of Sarmin.

Luʾluʾ was assassinated in 1117 at the instigation of the family of Sāʿid ibn Badīʿ while on his way to meet Sālim ibn Mālik, emir of Qalʿat Jaʿbar. During a rest at a place called Qalʿat Nādir, he was shot with arrows by some of his Turkish retainers who had been pretending to hunt rabbit. Although the assassins plundered the regent's treasure, the people of Aleppo were able to recover it. Luʾluʾ was succeeded as atabeg by Shams al-Khawāṣṣ Yārūqtāsh, who had been his military commander. Ibn al-Athīr reports the rumour that Luʾluʾ had intended to kill the young sultan and was assassinated before he could by some friends of Sulṭān Shāh. Āmina Khātūn took de facto control of the city.

== Sources ==
- Amabe, Fukuzo (2016). Urban Autonomy in Medieval Islam: Damascus, Aleppo, Cordoba, Toledo, Valencia and Tunis. Brill.
- Asbridge, Thomas (2000). The Creation of the Principality of Antioch, 1098–1130. Boydell Press. ISBN 978-0-85115-661-3.
- Ayalon, David (1999). Eunuchs, Caliphs and Sultans: A Study in Power Relationships. Magnes Press, The Hebrew University. ISBN 978-9-6549-3017-8.
- Cahen, Claude (1940). La Syrie du nord à l'époque des croisades et la principauté franque d'Antioche. Études arabes, médiévales et modernes. P. Geuthner. ISBN 9782351594186.
- El-Azhari, Taef (1997). The Saljūqs of Syria During the Crusades, 463–549 A.H./1070–1154 A.D. Klaus Schwarz.
- El-Azhari, Taef (2019). Queens, Eunuchs and Concubines in Islamic History, 661–1257. Edinburgh University Press.
- Richards, D. S., ed. (2007). The Chronicle of Ibn al-Athīr for the Crusading Period from Al-Kāmil Fī'l-ta'rīkh, Part 2: The Years 491–541/1097–1146, The Coming of the Franks and the Muslim Response. Ashgate. ISBN 978-0-7546-4078-3.
