= Berjhab =

Berjhab برجهاب
- Village
- Location in Syria
- Coordinates: 35°53′3″N 36°32′14″E
- Country: Syria
- Governorate: Idlib
- District: Ariha District
- Subdistrict: Ariha Nahiyah

Population (2004)
  - Total: 619
- Time zone: UTC+2 (EET)
  - Summer (DST): UTC+3 (EEST)
- City Qrya Pcode: C4276

Berjhab (Arabic: برجهاب) is a Syrian village located in Ariha Nahiyah in Ariha District, Idlib. According to the Syria Central Bureau of Statistics (CBS), Berjhab had a population of 619 in the 2004 census.

== History ==
The region witnessed the Battle of Hab on August 14, 1119.

== Sources ==
- Smail, R. C. (1956). Crusading Warfare 1097-1193. Cambridge University Press.
