= Kara Arslan =

Artuqid Emir and bey of Hasankeyf (1144–1174)

Fakhr al-Din Kara Arslan
- Emir of Hasankeyf
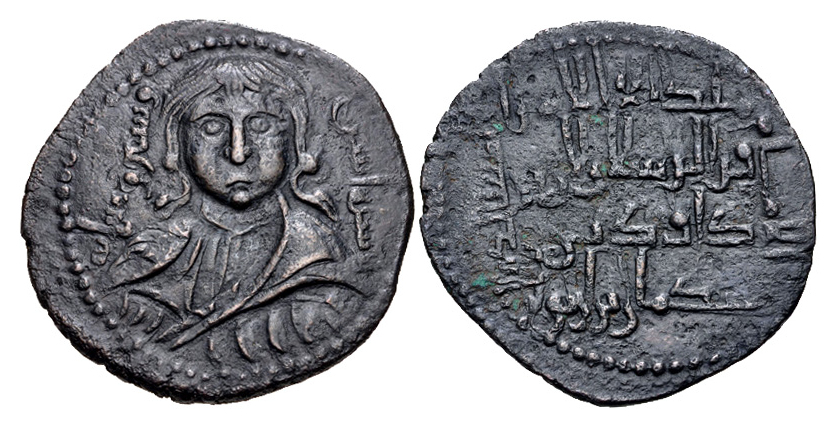
- Coin of Kara Arslan, dated AH 562 (1166–7 CE) minted with his name and Abbasid caliph.
- Rule: 1144 – 1174
- Predecessor: Muʿīn ad-Dīn Soqman ibn Artuq (1102–1104), Ibrahim of Hisn Kaifa (1104–1109)
- Successor: Nur al-Din Muhammad
- Died: Syria
- Children: Nur al-Din Muhammad
- House: Artuqid
- Father: Rukn al-Dawla Da'ud
- Religion: Sunni Islam

Fakhr al-Din Kara Arslan (or Qara Arslan) (r. 1144–1174 CE) was a member of the Artuqid dynasty and son of Rukn al-Dawla Dāʾūd, bey of Hasankeyf. Kara Arslan ruled Hasankeyf following Dāʾūd's death on 19 Muharram 539 (22 July 1144). He was the father of Nur al-Din Muhammad.

== Coinage policy ==
Artuqid coins were similar to those of other rulers, bearing the names (minted) of the ruler and the Abbasid caliphs.

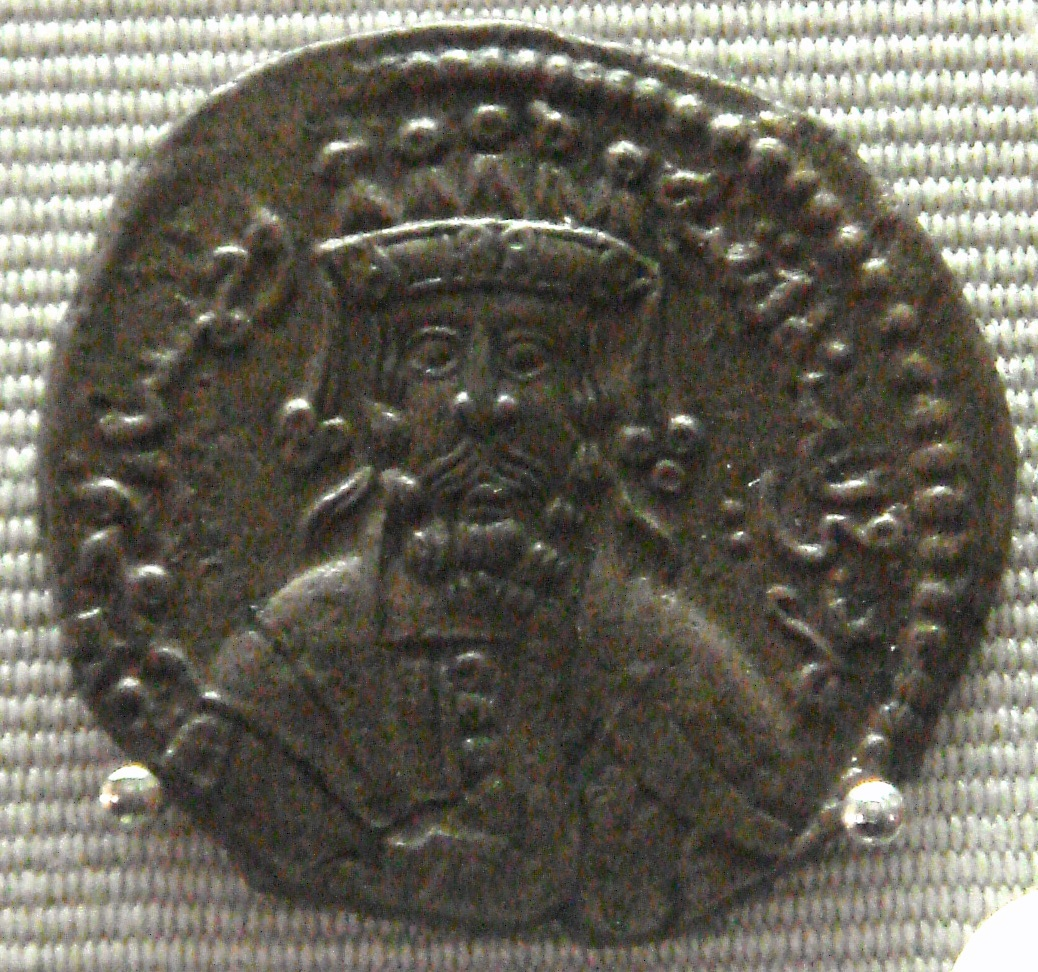
Kara Arslan fels, 1144–1166. Cabinet des Médailles

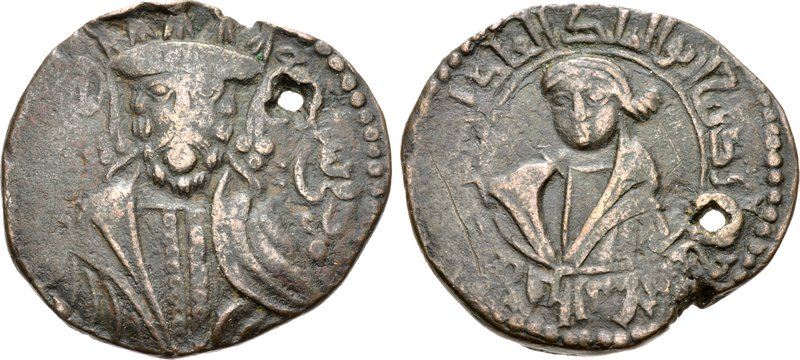
Coinage of Fakhr al-Din Qara Arslan, Hisn Kayfa or Amid mint. Dated AH 559 (AD 1163-4).

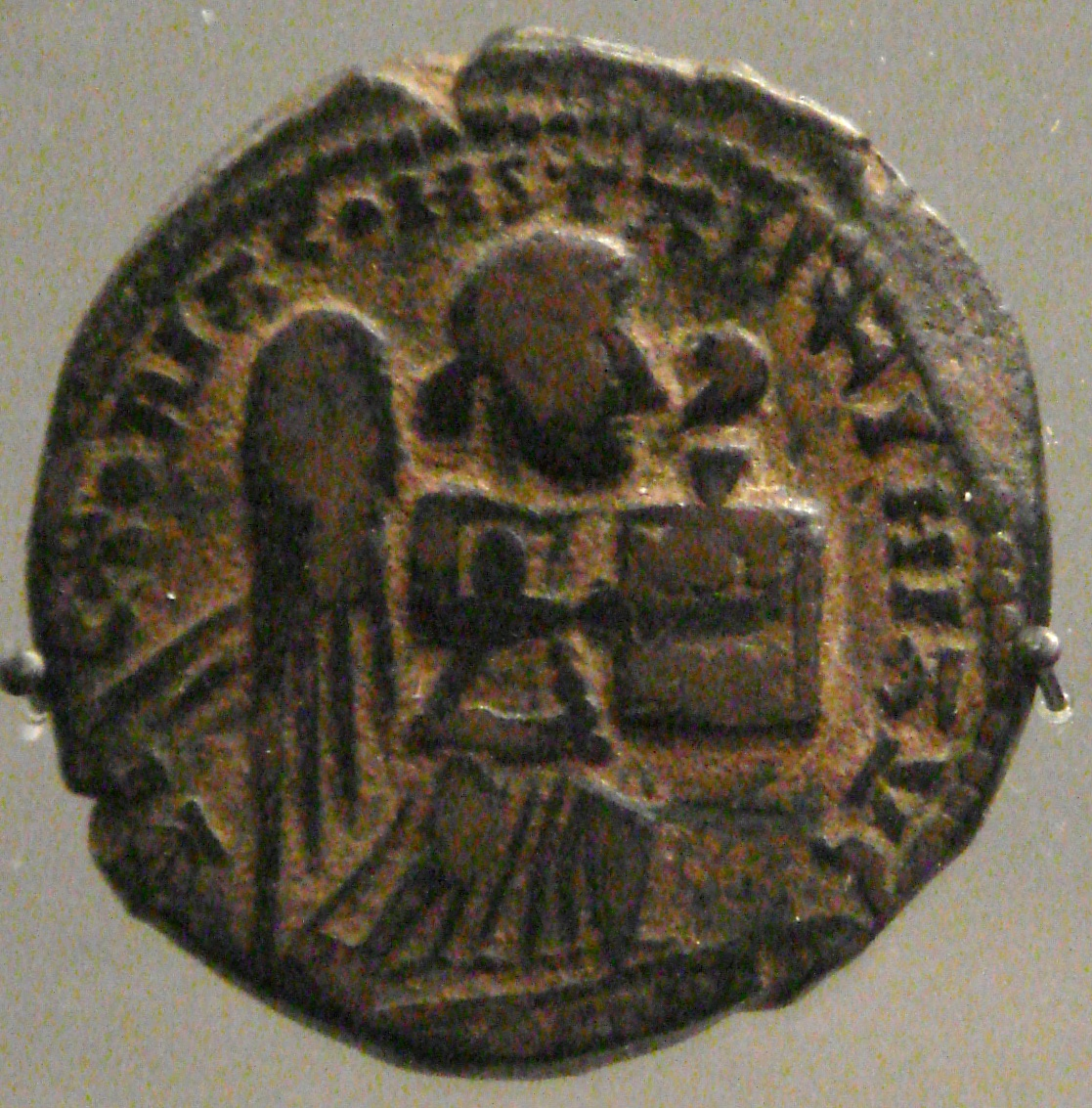
Coin of Kara Arslan, no date, mint of Amid, with Roman winged victory holding a book. British Museum.

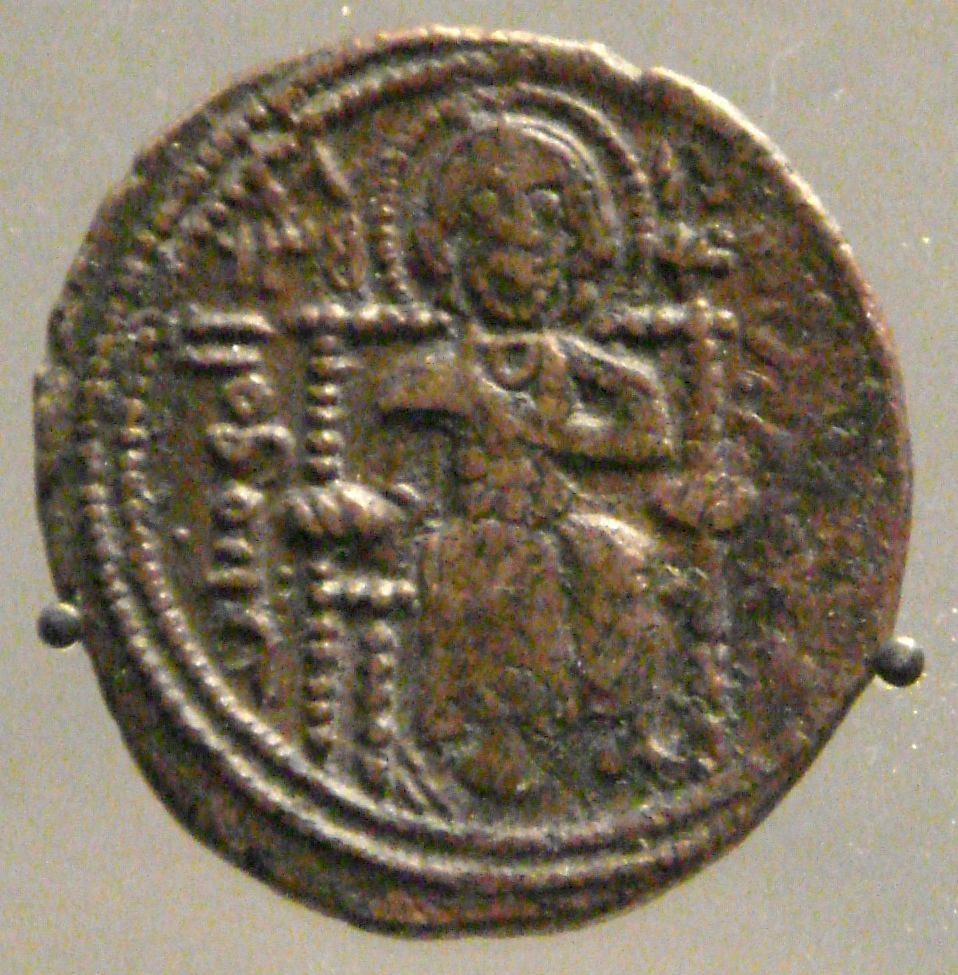
Coin of Kara Arslan, no date, mint of Amid, depicting enthroned Christ. British Museum.

Regnal titles
Preceded by Rukn al-Dawla Dāʾūd	Artuqid dynasty 1144–1174	Succeeded by Nur al-Din Muhammad

== Sources ==
- Bosworth, Clifford Edmund (2004). The new Islamic dynasties: a chronological and genealogical manual. Edinburgh University Press. ISBN 978-0-7486-2137-8.
