= Bursuq II =

Emir (or lord) of Hamadan (died c. 1116)

Bursuq ibn Bursuq, also known as Bursuk ibn Bursuk (died in 1116 or 1117), was the Emir of Hamadan.

== General ==
Bursuq ibn Bursuq was a Turkmen general in the service of the Seljuq Sultan Muhammad I Tapar, and was the most notable son of Bursuq the Elder. As Emir of Hamadan, he participated in the military campaigns against the crusader states since 1110. Ilghazi, Artuqid Emir of Mardin defeated the supreme commander of the Sultan's army, Aqsunqur al-Bursuqi, in late 1114, and later declared rebellion. Muhammad I soon replaced Aqsunqur with Bursuq, also charging him with the direction of jihad against the Crusaders. After gathering new troops in Mosul and Jazira, Bursuq invaded Syria in early 1115. After besieging Edessa for a short time, he marched towards Aleppo where he wanted to establish his base of operation. The eunuch atabeg of Aleppo, Lulu, sent envoys to Ilghazi, and the atabeg of Damascus, Toghtekin, seeking their assistance against Bursuq. Ilghazi and Toghtekin approached Roger of Salerno, who ruled the Principality of Antioch, and Roger soon called on the heads of the other crusader states, Baldwin I of Jerusalem, Pons of Tripoli and Baldwin II of Edessa. Roger defeated Bursuq in the Battle of Tell Danith on 14 September 1115. After Bursuq's defeat, the Seljuks of Mosul refrained from launching a new military expedition against the crusader states in Syria for ten years.

== Sources ==
- Barber, Malcolm (2012). The Crusader States. Yale University Press. ISBN 978-0-300-11312-9.
- Cahen, Claude (1969) [1955]. "The Turkish Invasion: The Selchükids". In Setton, Kenneth M.; Baldwin, Marshall W. (eds.). A History of the Crusades, Volume I: The First Hundred Years. Vol. 1 (Second ed.). Madison, Milwaukee, and London: University of Wisconsin Press. pp. 135–176. ISBN 0-299-04834-9.
- Finck, Harold S. (1969) [1955]. "The Foundation of the Latin States, 1099-1118". In Setton, Kenneth M.; Baldwin, Marshall W. (eds.). A History of the Crusades, Volume I: The First Hundred Years. Vol. 1 (Second ed.). Madison, Milwaukee, and London: University of Wisconsin Press. pp. 368–409. ISBN 0-299-04834-9.
- Lock, Peter (2006). The Routledge Companion to the Crusades. Routledge. ISBN 9-78-0-415-39312-6.
