= Battle of Hab =

12th-century conflict

- Part of the Crusades
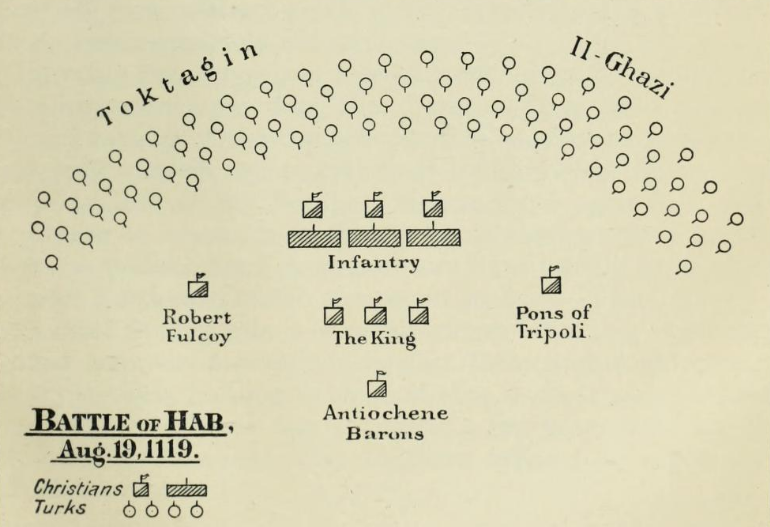
- Map of the battle of Hab in 1119 (from 1898)
Date	August 14, 1119
Location	Burj Hab, near Ariha, (modern Syria)
Result	Crusader victory

Belligerents
Kingdom of Jerusalem; County of Tripoli; Principality of Antioch	Artuqids of Aleppo

Commanders and leaders
Baldwin II of Jerusalem; Pons of Tripoli; Robert Fulcoy (captured and killed)	Ilghazi of Mardin

Strength
700 cavalry with "several thousand" infantry	Unknown

Casualties and losses
Unknown	Unknown

The Battle of Hab (Arabic: معركة هاب), also known as the Second Battle of Tell Danith, occurred on 14 August 1119, where a Crusader army commanded by King Baldwin II of Jerusalem won a disputed victory over a Muslim army led by Ilghazi of Mardin since the Muslim army claimed it as a victory also. The battle stabilised the Principality of Antioch, which had suffered a disastrous defeat only weeks before. Baldwin managed to re-take all of the castles conquered by Ilghazi and prevented him from marching on Antioch.

== Background ==
On 28 June 1119, Ilghazi's Turco-Syrian army destroyed the Antiochene army at the Battle of Ager Sanguinis. After his great victory, he captured several strongholds in the Principality of Antioch, but more might have been achieved. "The failure of Il Ghazi to profit from his major victory ... was due not only to his own subsequent and prolonged drunkenness, but to the scattering of his forces in search of plunder."

As soon as he heard the news, Baldwin brought a force north from his Kingdom of Jerusalem to rescue Antioch. On the way, he picked up a contingent from the County of Tripoli under Count Pons. Baldwin assembled the remnants of Antioch's army and added them to his own soldiers. Then he moved toward Zardana, 65 kilometers east-southeast of Antioch, which was besieged by Ilghazi. While camped at the Tell Danith watering point, Baldwin found out that Zardana had fallen. Accordingly, the Crusaders prepared to retreat to the stronghold of Hab, c. 25 kilometers southwest of Zardana.

== Battle ==
On the morning of 14 August, Baldwin carefully arranged his army for retreat through open country. Leading the way were three squadrons of 700 knights. Behind them marched the several thousand infantryman, consisting of bowmen and spearmen. Count Pons with his Tripolitan knights guarded the right flank. A body of Antiochene knights under Robert Fulcoy protected the left flank. More knights from Antioch guarded the rear. Baldwin led a reserve of mounted knights from Jerusalem, but it is not clear in what part of the formation he marched.

The Artuqids hoped to provoke the Frankish cavalry into launching a premature charge or to open gaps in the enemy infantry formation. When such a favorable opportunity presented itself, they closed in to fight with lance and sword. As anticipated, the Artuqid horse archers began harassing the column at dawn. Ilghazi's attacks soon increased in intensity, and the Crusader army was probably brought to a halt fairly early in the day. The three vanguard squadrons were dispersed, and the main body of infantry came under serious attack. The infantry sturdily defended itself but suffered heavy losses without its normal cavalry support.

On the left flank, Robert Fulcoy overcame the force opposed to him, but after pursuing the Artuqids, he rode off with his knights to look into the possibility of retaking his stronghold of Zardana. Meanwhile, the knights under Count Pons were scattered, and some fled as far away as Antioch and Tripoli, spreading the news of a disaster. Count Pons and a handful of knights rallied to join Baldwin's reserve where they continued the fight. With adroit use of his reserve knights, Baldwin saved the day. By intervening at each threatened sector, he held his army together during the long and bitter fight. Eventually, the Artuqids withdrew from the battlefield.

== Aftermath ==
In Baldwin's narrow tactical victory, the Crusaders suffered serious losses. It may be surmised that the Turkish army also took painful losses, since Ilghazi withdrew his men from the fight, though he claimed victory nevertheless. One historian notes "without opposition, Baldwin was able to recapture some of the places lost." Strategically, it was a Christian victory which preserved the Principality of Antioch for several generations. The next major engagement in the area was the Battle of Azaz in 1125.
