= Walter the Chancellor =

12th-century French or Norman crusader and author

Walter the Chancellor (also known as Galterius cancellarius, the Latinized form of his French name, Gautier) was a French or Norman crusader and author of the twelfth century.

He served as Chancellor of the Principality of Antioch and wrote Bella Antiochena ("Wars of Antioch" or "The Antiochene Wars") about the history of the principality from 1114–1122, mostly during the reign of Roger of Salerno. He was certainly present at the Battle of Ager Sanguinis in 1119, in which Roger was defeated and killed by Ilghazi, and Walter was probably taken into captivity for a brief time in Aleppo. He was a victim in the dungeons of Aleppo, he left a harrowing account of his comrade's tortures, mutilations and executions. Nothing more is known about him. Even his place of origin is uncertain, as the editorial introduction of Recueil des Historiens des Croisades points out. Some authors claim on the basis of "gallicisms" in his Latin that he is of French origin, while others cite the fact that he is in the party, and writing a history, of the Norman Roger of Salerno. The text itself gives no indication.

The Bella Antiochena was written in two parts, the first sometime before Ager Sanguinis in 1119, and the second probably around 1122, or in stages from 1119 to 1122. The work was published in Jacques Paul Migne's Patrologia Latina in 1853, the Recueil des Historiens des Croisades in 1895, and by H. Hagenmeyer in 1896. Walter was used as a source by the later 12th-century chronicler William of Tyre.
