= Roger of Salerno =

Regent of Antioch from 1112 to 1119

Roger
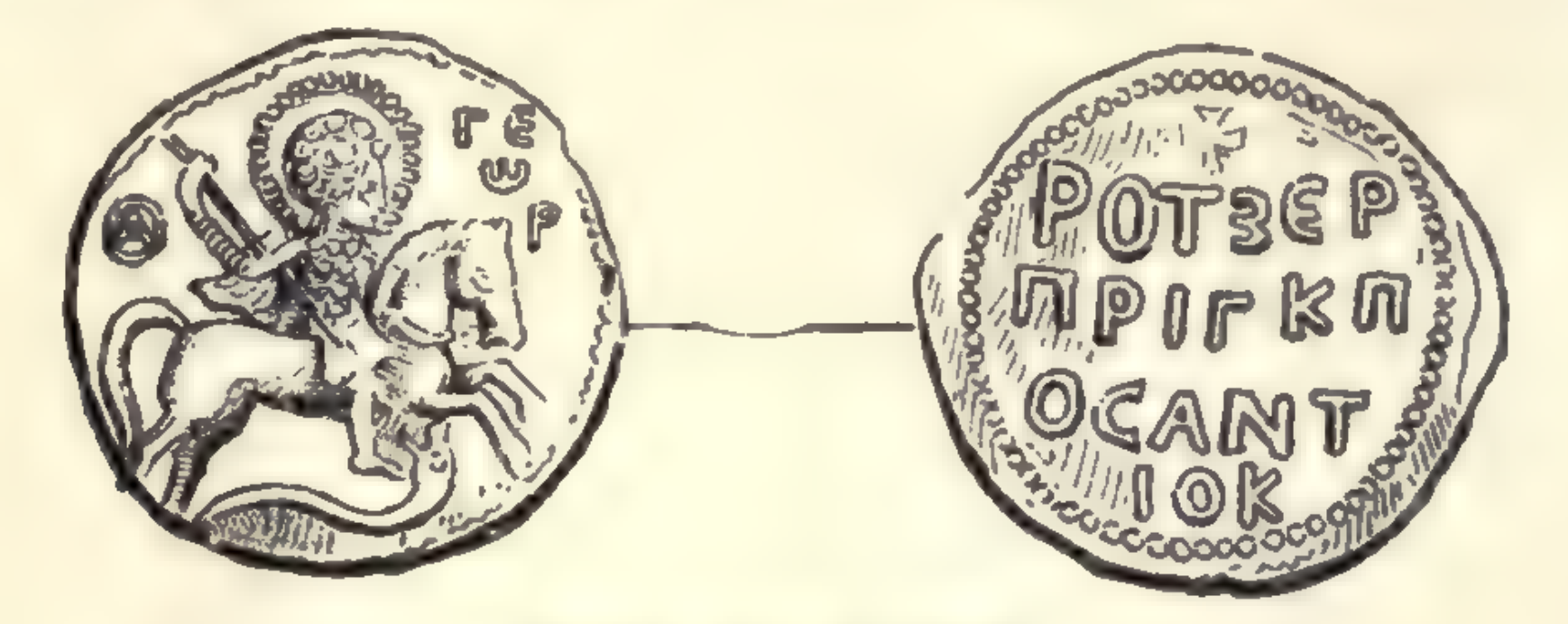
- Coin depicting St. George minted during Roger's tenure as Prince of Antioch

Regent of Antioch
- Reign: 1112–1119
- Predecessor: Tancred
- Successor: Baldwin II of Jerusalem
- Born: c. 1080; Sicily (?)
- Died: 28 June 1119 (aged 38–39); Balat, near Atarib
- Spouse: Cecilia of Le Bourcq
- House: Hauteville
- Father: Richard of Salerno
- Religion: Catholicism

Roger of Salerno (or Roger of the Principate) (c. 1080 – 28 June 1119) was regent of the Principality of Antioch from 1112 to 1119. He acquired the regency on the death of his predecessor, Tancred, as the actual prince, Bohemond II, was still a child. Although his power was conditional on Bohemond ever arriving in Antioch to rule, he adopted the title prince during his lifetime, and was referred to as such by most chroniclers. There seems to have been a party in Antioch that sought Bohemond's accession instead.

Roger spent much of the 1110s in conflict with Muslim powers. An earthquake in 1114–1115 destroyed much of the principality's fortifications, and Roger rushed to repair them under rumours of a Seljuk invasion. The Seljuk sultan had appointed Bursuq ibn Bursuq the commander of his forces and sent him to punish Ilghazi ibn Artuq and Toghtekin of Damascus, causing them to ally with the crusaders. When the coalition dispersed, Bursuq invaded Antioch, but Roger won a decisive victory at the Battle of Tell Danith in 1115. Antioch's power and Roger's reputation were buoyed after Tell Danith, allowing him to expand the principality.

After the murder of the weak ruler of Aleppo, Lulu al-Yaya, in 1117, Roger placed increasing pressure on the city, receiving significant concessions from the Aleppans between 1117 and 1119. The Aleppans brought in Ilghazi, and he invaded the principality in May 1119. Roger was ambushed at the Battle of Ager Sanguinis, suffering a decisive defeat and death.

== Early life ==
Roger was the son of Richard of Salerno and a sister of Tancred of Hauteville, who may have been living in Sicily at the time. Roger's birth is not known, but his father was probably born in the 1060s, and Roger had to have been born in the 1090s at the latest to be an adult in 1112. Little is known about Roger's coming to the east, but he presumably had accompanied his father on the First Crusade. Roger had kinship ties to both the Italo-Norman Hautevilles and the Lombard rulers of Sorrento. Richard, alongside Roger's uncle Tancred and several other Norman barons, left for the First Crusade within the host of Prince Bohemond I of Taranto, who would later become the first prince of Antioch.

Bohemond and Richard were captured by the Danishmendids in 1100 on an unsuccessful mission to support Gabriel of Melitene, causing Tancred, who was then Prince of Galilee, to accept the regency of Antioch in March 1101. On a charter of Tancred from 1101, later confirmed by Roger, he referred to himself as prince. Bohemond returned, but when he left again in 1105, Tancred was left to govern in his place and the place of Bohemond's young son, Bohemond II, after Bohemond died in 1111. Richard governed Edessa from 1104 to 1108, after which he was lord of Marash. During this time, Nicholas Morton believes that Roger must have built up a reputation as a warrior in the east.

== Regency ==
=== Accession ===
The crusader states around 1135

Tancred's power continued to rise and, by 1112, he was planning an expedition to conquer the territory of Kogh Vasil, but soon fell fatally ill, probably to typhoid. With Bohemund II still only four years old, Roger was chosen as the nearest male relative. Before bequeathing the principality, Tancred had Roger swear to hand over his power to the young Bohemond II should the boy ever come to Antioch. Roger seems to have ruled in his own right with all the powers of a prince; on his charters, he referred to himself as prince of Antioch. Although Fulcher of Chartres accused him of usurpation, other chroniclers treat him as the rightful ruler, referring to him as "prince". Roger was considered Tancred's direct successor and heir, but according to Andrew Buck, there was probably a party in Antioch who sought Bohemond's immediate succession, but the nature of the dispute is unclear. Roger renewed the tribute of Ridwan of Aleppo, demonstrating his personal authority.

On his accession, Roger married Cecilia, the sister of Baldwin II of Edessa (also known as Baldwin of Bourcq), while his sister Maria became the second wife to Joscelin of Courtenay, creating a network of alliances that stabilized the northern crusader states. According to Steven Runciman, though unfaithful as a husband, Roger had an affectionate relationship with his brother-in-law Baldwin. Roger of Salerno's reign seems to have warmed relations with Antioch and Jerusalem, and there was close coordination between the crusaders. Pons of Tripoli, a minor at his accession, had been in Tancred's household, and remained under Roger until his majority in 1115.

Baldwin I, king of Jerusalem launched a campaign against Toghtekin of Damascus in 1113; however, Toghtekin had recruited aid from Mawdud of Mosul, and the two defeated Baldwin at the Battle of Al-Sannabra. Baldwin sent to Roger for assistance, appealing to Christian unity, and Roger marched down, taking Pons with him, accompanied by a Tripolitan force. Toghtekin and Mawdud retreated in the face of Christian reinforcements. Upon arriving, Roger and Pons chastised Baldwin for his impetuosity. Roger recognized Baldwin's overlordship over the crusader states.

There was a series of earthquakes in north Syria from November 1114 to 1115, causing destruction in Antioch, Mamistra, Marash, and Atarib. Atarib was an important frontier fortress, and its destruction caused consternation among the Antiochenes. Roger rushed to oversee the reconstruction of the principality's fortifications, and there was a rumor that the Seljuk sultan would launch an expedition. As described by Walter the Chancellor, Roger first inspected the damage, procured resources, and then focused on repairing the most important fortifications. He may have concentrated on the castles within his princely domain. Susan B. Edgington praised Roger's leadership in the efforts.

=== Wars ===
The rumours were true; the sultan made Bursuq ibn Bursuq of Hamadan his supreme military commander in late 1114, ordering him to punish Ilghazi ibn Artuq and Toghtekin, and then move against the Franks. This represented a threatening attempt at centralisation from the sultan, alarming the local Turkish rulers. Lulu al-Yaya, the ruler of Aleppo, requested assistance from Ilghazi and Toghtekin, and they allied with Roger in the early summer of 1115, he travelled to Atarib with an army. There, Ilghazi and Toghtekin allied with Roger. The allies encamped near Apamea while Roger requested aid from King Baldwin, Pons, and Baldwin of Bourcq, causing Bursuq to retreat after harassing the Antiochene camp.

The Christian force dispersed after Bursuq withdrew, and he immediately renewed the offensive, seizing Kafartab on 3 September 1115, despite Roger's careful reconnaissance. Roger assembled his army of 2,000 infantry and 500–700 knights on 12 September, but was still heavily outnumbered. Neither army initially knew where the other was, but upon learning that Bursuq's force was marching carelessly near Tell Danith, Roger launched a surprise attack and routed Bursuq's army on 14 September. The battle was an overwhelming victory for Roger.

Latin authority over the Jabal al-Summaq was reinforced, with the castles of Kafartab and Ma'arrat al-Numan being rebuilt. The battle at Tell Danith broke the offensive spirit of the Seljuks, leaving the Latin states secure for the next few years. Roger's own reputation was buoyed among the Turks, who gave him the nickname Sirojal ("Sire Roger"). Toghtekin was convinced to break off his alliance with Roger and reconcile with the sultan. The fortresses of Saone, Balatanos, and Margat were captured by the principality between 1115 and 1118. Still, Roger did not act aggressively towards the east, probably satisfied with Lulu as ruler. Roger was left in an almost preeminent position in the northern crusader states.

Lulu was generally disliked by his subjects for his helplessness against the Franks, and was murdered in May 1117, being replaced by an Armenian eunuch named Yaruqtash. Left with military command of Aleppo, Yaruqtash made peace with Roger, granting him the castle of al-Qubba (south of Aleppo) and the right to extract duties from pilgrims to Mecca who passed through the town. Roger continued to apply pressure on Aleppo by besieging Azaz. This alarmed the Aleppans to the extent that they appealed to Ilghazi for assistance, but he was unable to save the town, and it fell to Roger. The Aleppans had to pay 10,000 dinars for peace, and in 1119, Roger seized Bizaah, north of Aleppo. Antioch now partially surrounded Aleppo with a semi-circular ring of settlements.

=== Death ===
The rise of Ilghazi in Aleppo allowed them to take an offensive stance against Antioch, and he was preparing for war by 1119's spring. By May, he was marching with a large army. Roger appealed to Baldwin and Pons for help, but was marching out by 20 June with 700 cavalry and 4,000 infantry, and encamped before the fortress of Artah. Roger was acting against the advice of the patriarch, Bernard of Valence, who had counselled him to wait for his allies to arrive. The prince intended to repeat his success at Tell Danith, and on 27 June he took the further step of leaving the army's burdensome items at Artah for greater flexibility. Meanwhile, Ilghazi attacked Atarib, but was held off by the garrison and chose to attack Roger's greatly outnumbered army on 28 June, which was camped at Balat, nearby.

Upon learning that he was surrounded at dawn, Roger planned a breakout and received confession from Peter, Archbishop of Apamea. The prince drew up his army into four divisions, but they were unable to break through, with his more inexperienced troops panicking and becoming entangled with the rest of the army. A whirlwind of dust further confused the Frankish army, and Roger himself was killed alongside many of his men. According to Walter the Chancellor, "not a single person trying to escape was able to get through unscathed." The Christian prisoners of war were treated brutally, and most of them were executed. Ilghazi's forces scattered to plunder the surrounding land and did not attack Antioch itself.

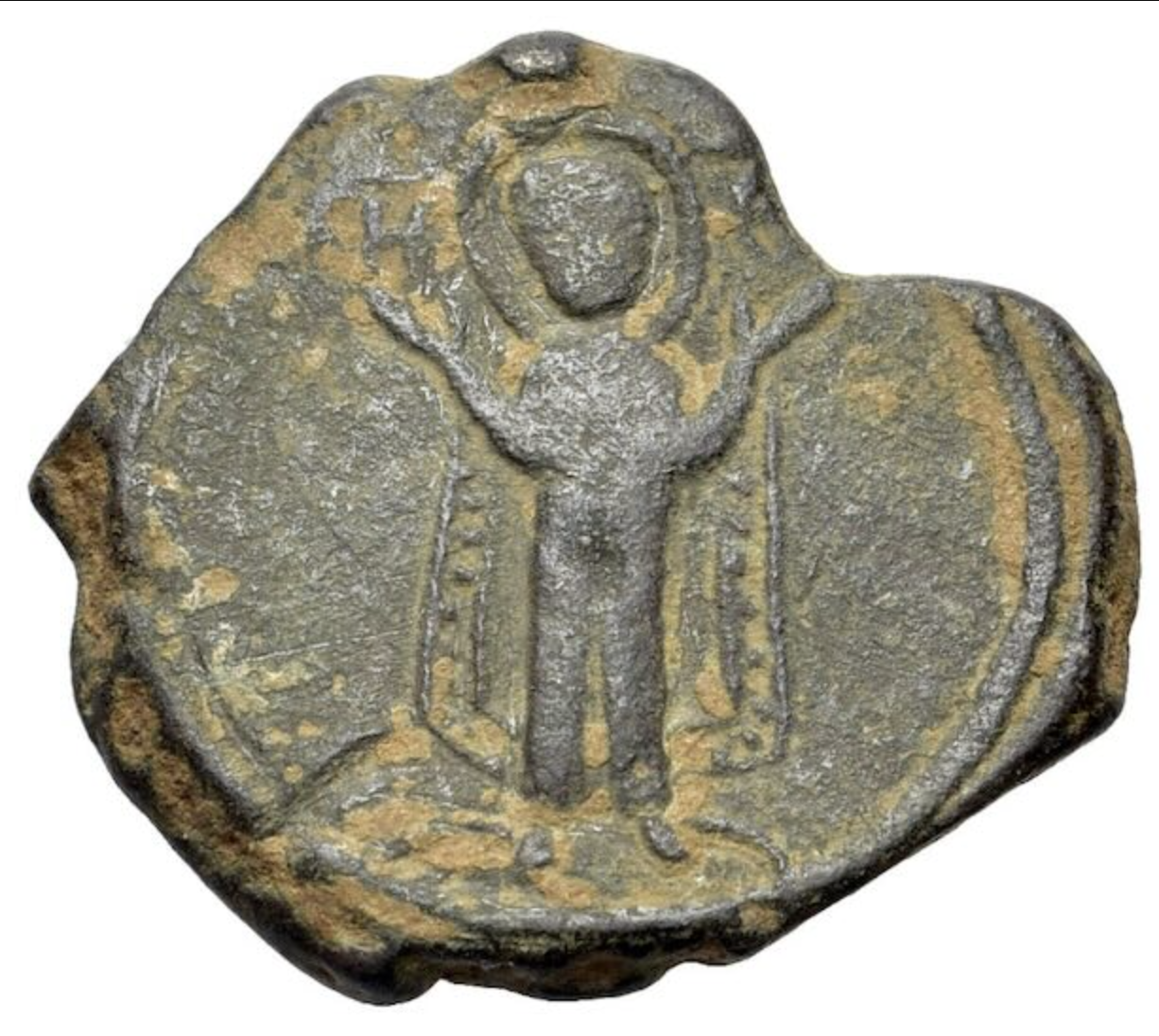
A coin of Roger's as prince. It depicts the Virgin Mary standing orans.

Roger is also known in numismatic history for the unique series of coins, minted during his reign. Despite ruling for less than seven years, he had two different types of coin, minted in his name at Antioch. The first type bore the image of the Mother of God Orans, standing full-height. The second type bore the image of the Miracle of Saint George and the Dragon. It is quite possible that it was minted after Roger's great victory at the Battle of Tell Danith. Prince Roger was in fact the first ruler in the Christian world to depict the Miracle of Saint George and the Dragon on his coinage.

== Character ==
Dr. Nicholas Morton in his book titled "The Field of Blood" describes Roger's personality in terms of a vigorous and martial leader, someone who eagerly followed in Tancred's "of good memory" footsteps and was “every bit as pugilistic” (militarily aggressive) as his predecessor. Morton stresses Roger's energetic commitment to defending Antioch, which during his time was one of Christendom's easternmost polities, and willingness to engage the Artuqid Turks, though Morton highlights that Roger was perhaps too eager in his belligerence, as on the eve of the Battle of Ager Sanguinis, it ultimately resulted in his demise and a reassessment by the Antiochene lords of territorial pretensions on Aleppo and the rest of Syria.

== Sources ==
- Asbridge, Thomas (2000). The Creation of the Principality of Antioch, 1098–1130. Boydell & Brewer. ISBN 978-0-85115-661-3.
- Asbridge, Thomas; Edgington, Susan B, eds. (1999). Walter the Chancellor's The Antiochene Wars: A Translation and Commentary. London and New York: Routledge.
- Asbridge, Thomas (1997). "The significance and causes of the battle of the Field of Blood". Journal of Medieval History. 23 (4).
- Babcock, Emily Atwater; Krey, August C., eds. (1943). William of Tyre: A History of Deeds Done Beyond the Sea. Vol. IX. Columbia University Press.
- Barber, M. (2012). The Crusader States. Yale University Press.
- Beech, George T. (1993). "A Norman-Italian Adventurer in the East: Richard of Salerno 1097-1112". In Chibnall, Marjorie (ed.). Anglo-Norman Studies XV. Proceedings of the Battle Conference 1992. The Boydell Press. pp. 25–40.
- Brun, Sergei (2017). "Byzantine iconography on the coinage of the Norman Prince Roger of Antioch".
- Buck, Andrew (2024). "The coins of Prince Roger of Antioch (1112–19): Power, interculturality, and crusade memory in the Latin East". Medieval Encounters. 33 (2). ISSN 1380-7854.
- Edgington, Susan B. (2006a). "Roger of Antioch (d. 1119)". In Murray, Alan V. (ed.). The Crusades: An Encyclopedia. Vol. 1. Bloomsbury Publishing. ISBN 1576078639.
- Edgington, Susan B. (2006b). "Bohemund I of Antioch (d. 1111)". In Murray, Alan V. (ed.). The Crusades: An Encyclopedia. Vol. 1. Bloomsbury Publishing. ISBN 1576078639.
- Edgington, Susan B. (2006c). "Ager Sanguinis, Battle of (1116)". In Murray, Alan V. (ed.). The Crusades: An Encyclopedia. Vol. 1. Bloomsbury Publishing. ISBN 1576078639.
- Fink, Harold S. (1969) [1955]. "The Foundation of the Latin States, 1099–1118". In Setton, Kenneth M.; Baldwin, Marshall W. (eds.). A History of the Crusades, Volume I: The First Hundred Years. Vol. 1 (Second ed.). Madison, Milwaukee, and London: University of Wisconsin Press. ISBN 0-299-04834-9.
- Lewis, Kevin James (2017). The Counts of Tripoli and Lebanon in the Twelfth Century: Sons of Saint-Gilles. Routledge. ISBN 978-1-4724-5890-2.
- Lock, Peter (2006). The Routledge Companion to the Crusades. Routledge. ISBN 978-0-415-39312-6.
- MacEvitt, Christopher (2006). "Bohemund II of Antioch (1108–1130)". In Murray, Alan V. (ed.). The Crusades: An Encyclopedia. Vol. 1. Bloomsbury Publishing. ISBN 1576078639.
- Morton, Nicholas (2020). The Crusader States & their Neighbours: A Military History, 1099–1187. Oxford University Press. ISBN 978-0-19-882454-1.
- Nicholson, Robert L. (1969) [1955]. "The Growth of the Latin States, 1118–1144". In Setton, Kenneth M.; Baldwin, Marshall W. (eds.). A History of the Crusades, Volume I: The First Hundred Years. Vol. 1 (Second ed.). Madison, Milwaukee, and London: University of Wisconsin Press. ISBN 0-299-04834-9.
- Runciman, Steven (1987). A History of the Crusades: The Kingdom of Jerusalem and the Frankish East, 1100–1187. Vol. II. Cambridge: University Press.
- Smail, R. C. (1995). Crusading Warfare 1097–1193 (2 ed.). Cambridge University Press. ISBN 0-521-48029-9.
- Stevenson, William Barron (1907). The Crusaders in the East: A Brief History of the Wars of Islam with the Latins in Syria During the Twelfth and Thirteenth Centuries. Cambridge: The University Press.
- Yewdale, Ralph Bailey (1917). Bohemond I, Prince of Antioch (PhD thesis). Princeton University.
- "RRR no. 62". The Crusades Regesta Database. Society for the Study of the Crusades and the Latin East.
- "RRR no. 187". The Crusades Regesta Database. Society for the Study of the Crusades and the Latin East.
