= Ilghazi =

Artukid ruler of Mardin from 1107 to 1122

Najm al-Din Ilghazi ibn Artuq

Emir of Aleppo
- Reign: 1118–1122
- Predecessor: Sultan Shah ibn Radwan
- Successor: Belek Ghazi

Emir of Mardin
- Reign: 1107–1122
- Predecessor: Sökmen
- Successor: Husam al-Din Timurtash
- Died: November 8, 1122; Diyarbekir
- Burial: Silvan
- Spouses: Farkhunda Khatun; Toghtekin's daughter
- Issue: Ayaz; Guhar Khatun al-Bazm; Shams ad-Daula Sulaiman; Safra Khatun; Yumna Khatun; Husam al-Din Timurtash
- House: Artuqids
- Father: Artuk Bey

Najm al-Din Ilghazi ibn Artuq (Arabic: نجم الدين إلغازي ابن أرتوك; died November 8, 1122) was the Turkoman Artukid ruler of Mardin from 1107 to 1122. He was born into the Oghuz tribe of Döğer.

== Biography ==
His father Artuk Bey was the founder of the Artukid dynasty, and had been appointed governor of Jerusalem by the Seljuq emir Tutush. When Artuk died, Ilghazi and his brother Sökmen succeeded him as governors of Jerusalem. In 1096, Ilghazi allied with Duqaq of Damascus and Yaghi-Siyan of Antioch against Radwan of Aleppo; Duqaq and Radwan were fighting for control of Syria after the death of Tutush. Ilghazi and Duqaq eventually quarrelled and Ilghazi was imprisoned, leading to the capture of Jerusalem by his brother Sökmen, but Ilgazi recovered the city when he was released. He held it until the city was captured by the Fatimid vizier of Egypt, al-Afdal Shahanshah, in 1098. After this he sought to make a name for himself in the Jezirah, where his brothers had also established themselves. He then entered the service of the Seljuq sultan Mahmud I, who granted him Hulwan and made him shihna of Baghdad, an office which oversaw the affairs of the caliph on behalf of the sultan.

Ilghazi was dismissed as shihna in 1104 and became leader of the Artukid family after the death of Sökmen that year. This was disputed by Sökmen's son Ibrahim, but Ilghazi took Mardin from him in 1108. As head of the Artukids he made no lasting alliances and frequently switched sides, allying with both fellow Muslims and Christian crusaders whenever he saw fit. In 1110, he participated in an unsuccessful siege of Edessa. In 1114, Ilghazi sent his son Ayaz with 300 men in the Seljuk campaign against Edessa led by Aqsunqur al-Bursuqi, Emir of Mosul, but after its failure, Aqsnqur captured Ayaz as a punishment for the unserious participation. After the news reached him, Ilghazi and his nephews Balak and Dawud, attacked and defeated Aqsunqur, and captured Mas'ud, son of the Seljuq sultan.

In 1115, Ilghazi rebelled against the Sultan, and allied with his father-in-law, Toghtekin, Emir of Damascus, and was captured briefly by the Emir of Homs, Khir-Khan. Ilghazi did not regain his freedom until he signed a treaty with Khir-Khan, under which he handed over his son Ayaz as a hostage; however, he subsequently returned and besieged Homs to retrieve him. Later that year, him and Toghtekin and Lu'lu' al-Khadim allied with Roger of Saleron, Baldwin I of Jerusalem, Pons of Tripoli, and Baldwin II of Edessa against the Seljuq general Bursuq ibn Bursuq (Note: Not to be confused with Aqsunqur al-Bursuqi.), who arrived to subjugate them. These armies gatherd in Apamea, then attacked Shaizar, but after receiving no response from the Seljuk army, they decided to end the campaign. Then Ilghazi returned to Mardin.

Ilghazi gained control of Aleppo after the assassination of Lulu in 1117. He was invited to take control by princess Amina Khatun. In 1118, he took control of Mayyafiriqin and pacified the surrounding countryside. In 1119, Ilghazi defeated and killed Roger at the Battle of Ager Sanguinis; Ibn al-Qalanisi describes the victory as "one of the finest of victories, and such plenitude of divine aid was never granted to Islam in all its past ages." The Antiochene towns of Atharib, Zerdana, Sarmin, Ma'arrat al-Numan and Kafartab fell to his army. "Il Ghazi, however, was unable to extract full profit from his victory. His prolonged drunkenness deprived his army of leadership, and left the Turkmens free to ... scatter after plunder."

Baldwin II (now Baldwin II of Jerusalem) soon arrived to drive Ilghazi back, inflicting heavy losses on the Turks in the hard-fought Battle of Hab on August 14, 1119. The next year Ilghazi took Nisibin, and then pillaged the County of Edessa. He burned and destroyed most villages and settlements between Tell Bashir and Kesoun, enslaving much of the population, before turning north torwards Armenia. According to Matthew of Edessa:

Once again Emir Ghazi massed troops and organized the brigades of his forces—some 133,000 men—and went against the nation of the Franks. He quickly arrived at the gates of the city of Edessa, generally filling the entire plain with his troops. He remained there for four days and his troops polluted all the fields. Then [Ghazi] up and went to Saruj. He secretly conveyed the greater part of his troops across the Euphrates River. Generally, from Tell Bashir to Kesoun he enslaved men and women, killing with the merciless sword, burning all the children in flames, mercilessly roasting a countless multitude. Now when Ghazi, with the multitude [of troops and captives] crossed the Euphrates, he put to the sword many villages, killing priests and clerics with sword and fire.

In 1121, he made peace with the crusaders, and with supposedly up to 250,000–350,000 troops, including men led by his son-in-law Sadaqah and Sultan Malik of Ganja, he invaded Georgia. David IV of Georgia met him at the Battle of Didgori and Ilgazi was defeated. According to Matthew of Edessa 400,000 Seljuks were killed. Among the various leaders, only Ilghazi and his son-in-law Dubays ibn Sadaqa escaped.

In 1122, Ilghazi and Balak defeated Joscelin I of Edessa and took him prisoner, but Ilgazi died in November of that year at Diyarbekir. He was buried at Mayyafariqin (Silvan today). Balak succeeded him in Aleppo and his sons Suleiman and Timurtash succeeded him in Mardin.

Ibn al-Qalanisi is generally neutral on the character of Ilghazi, and describes only one "disgraceful habit" of the emir: "Now when Ilghazi drank wine and it got the better of him, he habitually remained for several days in a state of intoxication, without recovering his senses sufficiently to take control or to be consulted on any matter or decision." The Antiochene chronicler Walter the Chancellor was at first also neutral towards Ilghazi, until the Battle of Ager Sanguinis, in which Walter himself was captured; Ilghazi (written as "Algazi" in Latin) is then described as a "tyrant" and the "prince of the delusion and dissent of the Turcomans." Walter also remarks on Ilghazi's drunkenness.

== Family and issue ==
Ilghazi married first Farkhunda Khatun, tdaughter of Ridwan, Emir of Aleppo, but he never actually met her and the marriage was never consummated. He then married the daughter of Toghtekin, Emir of Damascus and had the following children with her:

- Ayaz.
- Guhar Khatun, married Dubais ibn Sadaqa.
- al-Bazm.
- Shams ad-Daula Sulaiman.
- Safra Khatun, married Husam ad-Din Qurti ibn Toghlan Arslan.
- Yumna Khatun, married Sa'd ad-Daula Il-aldi of Amid.
- al-Sa'id Husam ad-Din Timurtash, who was succeeded him as Emir of Mardin.

He also had a son, Umar, by a concubine, and Nasr, by a slave; another possible son was named Kirzil.

== See also ==
- Artukid dynasty
- Ahlatshahs
- Venetian Crusade, which offers a detailed explanation of his invasions of the Crusader States.

== Sources ==
- Steven Runciman, A History of the Crusades, vol. I: The First Crusade and the Foundation of the Kingdom of Jerusalem. Cambridge University Press, 1951.
- Kenneth Setton, ed. A History of the Crusades, vol. I. University of Pennsylvania Press, 1958 (available online).
- William of Tyre. A History of Deeds Done Beyond the Sea. Edited and translated by E. A. Babcock and A. C. Krey. Columbia University Press, 1943.
- Armenia and the Crusades, Tenth to Twelfth Centuries: The Chronicle of Matthew of Edessa. Translated by Ara Edmond Dostourian. National Association for Armenian Studies and Research, 1993.
- The Damascus Chronicle of the Crusades: Extracted and Translated from the Chronicle of Ibn al-Qalanisi. H.A.R. Gibb, London, 1932.
- Walter the Chancellor's "The Antiochene Wars": A Translation and Commentary, trans. Thomas S. Asbridge and Susan B. Edgington, Ashgate, 1999.
- Carole Hillenbrand, "The career of Najm al-Din Il-Ghazi", Der Islam 58 (1981).
- Carole Hillenbrand, A Muslim Principality in Crusader Times: The Early Artuqid State. Nederlands Historisch-Archaeologisch Instituut, 1990.
- Carole Hillenbrand, The Crusades: Islamic Perspectives. Routledge, 2000.
- Smail, R. C. Crusading Warfare 1097–1193. New York: Barnes & Noble Books, (1956) 1995. ISBN 1-56619-769-4
