= Toghtekin =

12th-century Turkic military leader and ruler of Damascus

Zahir al-Din Toghtekin
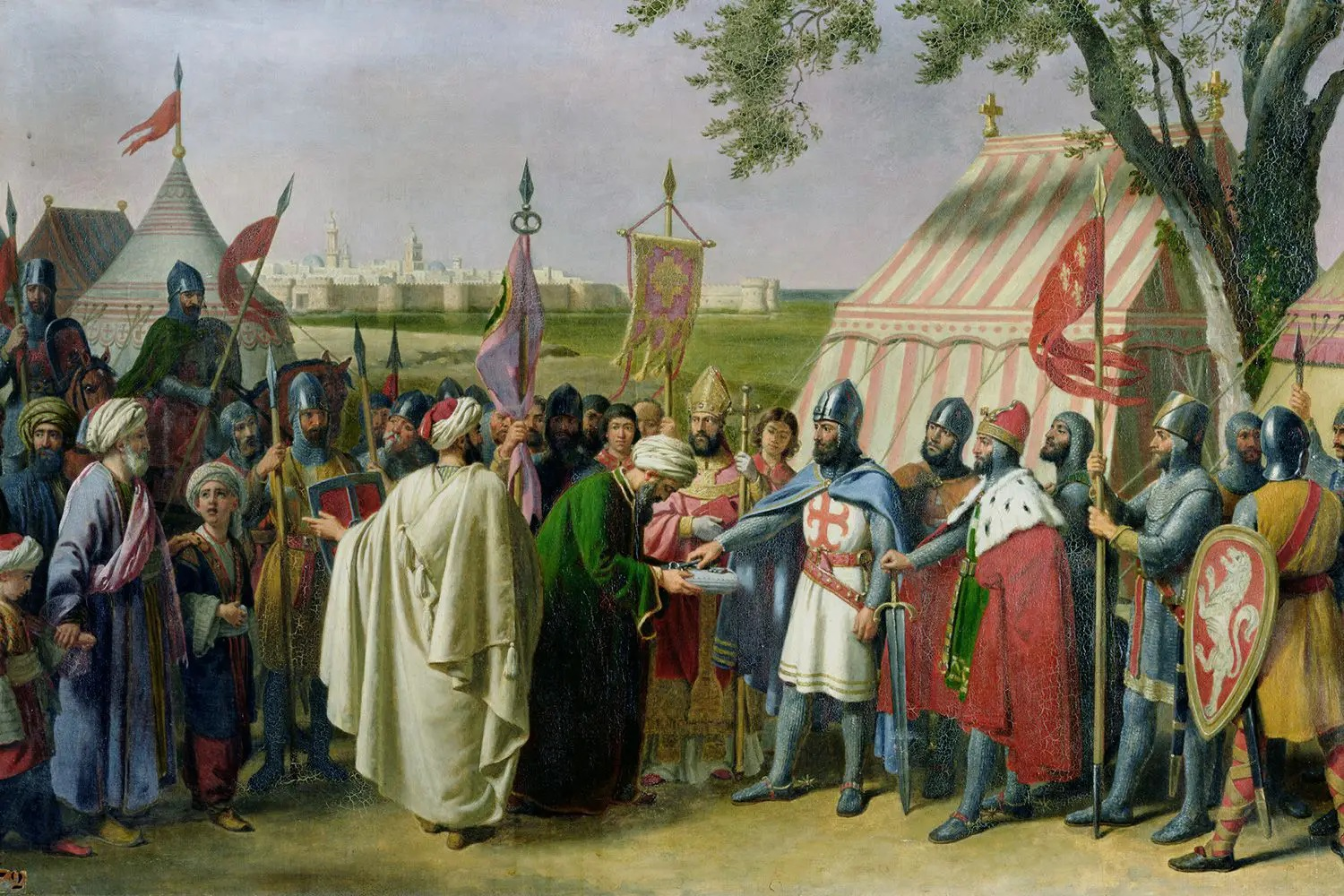

Emir of Damascus
- Reign: 1104–1128
- Predecessor: Irtash
- Successor: Taj al-Muluk Buri
- Died: February 12, 1128; Damascus
- Issue: Taj al-Muluk Buri
- House: Burids

Zahir al-Din Toghtekin or Tughtekin (Arabic: ظاهر الدين طغتكين, romanized: Zahir ad-Din Tughtikin; died February 12, 1128), also spelled Tughtegin, was a Turkoman military leader, who was emir of Damascus from 1104 to 1128. He was the founder of the Burid dynasty of Damascus.

== Biography ==
Toghtekin was a junior officer to Tutush I, Seljuq emir of Damascus and Syria. After the former's death in 1095, civil war erupted, and Toghtekin supported Tutush's son Duqaq as emir of the city against Ridwan, the emir of Aleppo. In the chaotic years which ensued Toghtekin was sent to reconquer the town of Jebleh, which had rebelled against the qadi of Tripoli, but he was unable to accomplish his task.

On October 21, 1097, a Crusader army began the siege of Antioch. The local emir, Yaghi-Siyan, though nominally under Ridwan's suzerainty, appealed to Duqaq to send an armed force to their rescue. Duqaq sent Toghtekin, but on December 31, 1097, he was defeated by Bohemund of Taranto and Robert II of Flanders, and was forced to retreat. Another relief attempt was made by a joint force under Kerbogha, the atabeg of Mosul, and Toghtekin, which was also crushed by the Crusaders on June 28, 1098.

When the Crusaders moved southwards from the newly conquered Antioch, the qadi of Jebleh sold his town to Duqaq, who installed Toghtekin's son, Taj al-Muluk Buri as its ruler. His tyrannical rule, however, led to his quick downfall. In 1103, Toghtekin was sent by Duqaq to take possession of Homs at the request of its inhabitants, after the emir Janah al-Dawla had been murdered by Assassins by order of Ridwan.

The following year Duqaq died and Toghtekin, now acting as regent and de facto ruler, had the former's junior son Tutush II proclaimed emir, while he married Duqaq's widow and reserved for himself the title of atabeg. After deposing Tutush II he had the brother of Duqaq, Irtash, named emir, but soon afterward he had him exiled. Irtash, with the support of Aytekin al-Halabi, the emir of Bosra, tried to reconquer Damascus, but was pushed back by Toghtekin and forced to find help at the court of King Baldwin I of Jerusalem.

Around 1106, Toghtekin intervened to momentarily raise the siege of Tripoli by the Crusaders, but could not prevent the definitive capture of the city. In May 1108 he was able to defeat a small Christian force under Gervaise of Bazoches, lord of Galilee. Gervaise was proposed to be freed in exchange for his possession, but he refused and was executed. In April 1110, Toghtekin besieged and captured Baalbek and named his son Buri as governor, replacing al-Taj Gümüshtegin.

Late in November 1111, the town of Tyre, which was besieged by Baldwin's troops, put itself under Toghtekin's protection. Toghtekin, supported by Fatimid forces, intervened, forcing the Franks to raise the siege on April 10, 1112; however, he refused to take part in the anti-Crusade effort launched by Mawdud of Mosul, fearing that the latter could take advantage of it to gain rule over the whole of Syria.

Nonetheless, the next year the two Muslim commanders allied in reply to the ravages of Baldwin I and Tancred of Antioch. Their army besieged Tiberias, but they were unable to conquer it despite a sound victory at the Battle of al-Sannabra in 1113 and they were forced to retreat to Damascus when Christian reinforcements arrived and supplies began to run out. During his sojourn in the city, Mawdud was killed by the Assassins on October 2, 1113. Toghtekin accused Ridwan of ordering the murder, but most contemporary commentators blamed Toghtekin. Baldwin was reported to have sent Toghtekin a letter accusing him of the crime. There is no clear evidence linking him to Mawdud's death, but the mere suspicion isolated him from the Seljuks, whom accused him as the mastermind, causing tension and mistrust from Toghtekin towerds them. In 1114, he signed an alliance against the Franks with, Alp Arslan al-Akhras, the new Emir of Aleppo, but the latter was murdered a short time later by his atabeg Luʾluʾ al-Yaya.

In 1115, Toghtekin rebelled against the Seljuk sultan Muhammad I Tapar, and decided to ally himself with his son-in-law, Ilghazi, against the Seljuk general Bursuq ibn Bursuq, who had been sent by the Muhammad I to fight the Artuqids and Crusaders. Lu'lu' al-Yaya joined them and together they allied with the Crusader states, but the Seljuks didn't attack them, so they ended the campaign . Toghtekin returned to Damascus. The following year, judging the Franks too powerful, he visited Baghdad to obtain a pardon from the sultan, though never forgetting to remain independent himself between the two main forces.

Allied with Ilghazi, emir of Aleppo, he attacked Athareb in the Principality of Antioch, but was defeated at the Battle of Hab on August 14, 1119. In the June of the following year he sent help to Ilghazi, who was again under peril of annihilation in the same place. In 1122 the Fatimids, no longer able to defend Tyre, sold it to Toghtekin, who installed a garrison there, but the garrison was unable to prevent its capture by the Franks on July 7, 1124.

In 1125, al-Bursuqi, now in control of Aleppo, appeared in the Antiochean territory with a large army which Toghtekin joined; however, the two were defeated at the Battle of Azaz on June 11, 1125. The following January Toghtekin also had to repel an invasion by Baldwin II of Jerusalem. In late 1126 he again invaded the Principality of Antioch with Bursuqi, but again with no results.

Toghtekin died in 1128. He was succeeded by his son Buri.

In the Old French Crusade cycle chansons de geste, Toghtekin is known as "Dodequin".

== See also ==
- Bahram al-Da'i

== Sources ==
- Asbridge, Thomas (2010). The Crusades: The War for the Holy Lands. Simon & Schuster. ISBN 978-1-4711-9643-0.
- Grousset, René (1934). Histoire des croisades et du royaume franc de Jérusalem - I. 1095-1130 L'anarchie musulmane.
- Maalouf, Amin (1984). The Crusades Through Arab Eyes. New York: Schocken Books. ISBN 0-8052-0898-4.
- Runciman, Steven (1951). A History of the Crusades, Volume One: The First Crusade and the Foundation of the Kingdom of Jerusalem. Cambridge University Press. pp. 215, 221–222.

Regnal titles
Preceded by Muhi ad-Din Baqtash	Atabeg of Damascus; 1104–1128	Succeeded by Taj al-Muluk Buri
