= Siege of Mosul (1108) =

Jawali's Rebellion
Date	April-September 1108
Location	Mosul
Result	Seljuk victory
Territorial changes	Mosul returns to the domains of the Sultanate

Belligerents
Seljuk Empire: Banu Bursuq; Shah-Armens; Annazids; Hadhabanids	Emirate of Mosul

Commanders and leaders
Mawdud; Sokmen al-Kutbi; Aqsunqur al-Bursuqi; Nasr ibn Muhalhal ibn Abi al-Shawk al-Kurdi; Husam al-Din Abu'l-Hayja	Bursuq's daughter (Jawali's wife)

Strength
strong army	1,500 cavalry

The Siege of Mosul (1108) was a military siege led by forces loyal to the Seljuk Sultan Muhammad I Tapar in the year 1109 against the city of Mosul, which was ruled by Jawali Saqawa, who had rebelled against the Sultan.

== Background ==
After his victory in his war with Shams al-Dawla Jikirmish and Kilij Arslan I in 1107, Jawali Saqawa became the Emir of Mosul. Jawali pledged his loyalty to Sultan Muhammad I Tapar, and he launched a campaign against Alamut Castle and defeated the Nizaris. The Sultan rewarded him by granting him every land he conquered. Jawali became arrogant and began to refrain from fulfilling his financial obligations, and he refused to respond to the Sultan's invitation in 1108, claiming that he feared the consequences of going. Soon, the matter ended with Jawali's rebellion and his declaration of disobedience to the Sultan. Jawali corresponded with Sadaqa ibn Dabis al-Mazyadi, the Emir of Hillah, who was at war with the Sultan, inviting him to an alliance. However, Sultan Muhammad defeated and killed him before anything happened between them. Then he sent the Emirs of Banu Bursuq, Sokmen al-Kutbi, Mawdud ibn al-Tuntakin, Aqsunqur al-Barsuqi, Nasr ibn Muhalhal ibn Abi al-Shawk al-Kurdi, and Husam al-Din Abu al-Hayja, the Emir of Irbil, to seize Mosul and take it from Jawali.

=== Preparations ===
Jawali took all defensive measures, so he built the wall of Mosul and strengthened what Jikirmish had built before him, and prepared ammunition, provisions and fighting machines, and pressured the notables of the city and arrested many of them, and expelled many of its inhabitants and threatened to kill anyone who spoke about that matter, and left his wife, Bursuq's daughter, to run the country, and put her in the fortress and left with her one thousand and five hundred horsemen and a number of infantry, and took with him Baldwin II, Count of Edessa, who was a prisoner in the hands of the Muslims, then he plundered the farms surrounding Mosul before he left it towards Nusaybin.

== Siege ==
The siege began in Ramadan / April-May 1108. Unlike the siege of 1104, relations between the inhabitants of Mosul and their rulers were strained this time. With Jawali's departure, his wife confiscated the property of the remaining notables and persecuted the wives of dissidents, leading to alienation and a lack of cooperation between her and the people. Sensing this, Jawali's wife prevented the common people from approaching the walls. The people suffered from attacks from outside and oppression from within. The Sultan's forces continued their attacks until the beginnings of September 1108.

During the siege, Sultan Muhammad sent Hussein ibn Atabeg Qatghalaktin and Fakhr al-Mulk bin Ammar with a message to Jawali, offering peace and ordering him to surrender his territories to the Sultan and go to jihad with Ibn Ammar. Jawali confirmed that he was a vassak of the Sultan and said: I am a mamluk of the Sultan, in his obedience. Jawli tried to exploit Hussein and told him to go and ask the army besieging Mosul to lift the siege on it, and promised him that he would send with him a man twho will take Jawali's son and give him to Hussein as a hostage. Indeed, Hussein ibn Qatghalaktin went and ordered the emirs to end the siege, and they all agreed except for Mawdud, who arrested the men Jawali sent with and said that he would not lift the siege unless the Sultan ordered him to do so. Hussein then left, and Mawdud continued the siege alone.

As the siege dragged on and intensified, a group of plasterers (Jassasin), led by a plasterer named Sa'di, conspired to surrender the city to the Sultan's forces by creating a breach in the wall. On a Friday, during the Friday prayer, the plasterers climbed one of the towers, closed the gates, killed the sleeping soldiers, took their weapons, and threw them from the top. They then seized another tower, but the garrison discovered them this time, and two hundred soldiers shot them with arrows. The plasterers repelled the attack while calling out the Sultan's slogan, and the Sultan's forces heard this and advanced towards the towers that the plasterers had opened, and Emir Mawdud entered Mosul.

== Aftermath ==
After Mawdud entered Mosul, he restored security and returned homes and property to the people. Jawali's wife, however, remained in the citadel for eight days. She sent a message to Mawdud, asking him to grant her safe passage and allow her to leave Mosul. He swore an oath to that effect and let her go. She then departed with the plunder she had carried to her brother, Bursuq II, the Emir of Hamadan. Mawdud ibn Altuntakin assumed control of Mosul, restoring it to the authority of Sultan Muhammad I Tapar. Meanwhile, for Jawali, this deafet was a blow to his projects and plans, espicially that it came right before the decisive Battle of Turbessel between him and his allie Baldwin II against their enemy Tancred of Antioch, as the loss of Mosul was a reason for his soldiers and leaders to abandon him before and mid-battle.
