= War of Mosul (1106–1107) =

Date	September 1106 – July 1107
Location	Upper Mesopotamia
Result	Seljuk Empire and Jawali victory; Mosul is restored as part of the domain of Muhammad I Tapar

Belligerents
Pre-Jikirmish's death: Emirate of Mosul; Hadhabanid Emirate of Erbil Post-Jikirmish's death: Seljuk Sultanate of Rum: Emirate of Mosul; Inalid Beylik; Beylik of Çubukoğulları; Beylik of Mayyafariqin	Seljuk Empire; Seljuk Sultanate of Aleppo; Artuqids of Mardin

Commanders and leaders
Pre-Jikirmish's death: Shams al-Dawla Jikirmish (POW) # Zengi ibn Jikirmish; Ghazaghli; Abu al-Qasem ibn Wad'an (executed); Abu Talib ibn Kusayrat; Husam al-Din Abu'l-Hayja; Abu'l-Hayja's son (POW) Post-Jikirmish's death: Kilij Arslan I †/ ‡‡ Malik Shah ibn Kilij Arslan (POW); Ibrahim ibn Yinal al-Turkmani; Muhammad ibn Jabq al-Turkmani; Emir Idbar; Muhammad ibn al-Sabbaq al-Shaybani; Habashi ibn Jikirmish (surrendered); Ghazaghli (surrendered); Mehmet ibn Çubuk; Ziyaeddin Muhammad of Mayyafariqin	Jawali Saqawa; Fakhr al-Mulk Ridwan; Najm al-Din Ilghazi; Karmawi ibn Khurasan al-Turkomani; Muhammad ibn al-Sabbaq al-Shaybani (switched sides); Abu Talib ibn Kusayrat (switched sides) (executed)

The War of Mosul was a war that took place in 1106 and 1107 between the forces of Jawali Saqawa and Shams al-Dawla Jikirmish, who had been dimissed as Emir of Mosul by Sultan Muhammad I Tapar in favor of Jawali. Following Jikirmish's death in 1106, his son sought help from the Seljuk Sultanate of Rum under Kilij Arslan I, who tried to annex Mosul into his domain.

== Background ==
After the siege of Mosul in 1104, Sultan Muhammad I Tapar allowed the Emir of Mosul, Shams al-Dawla Jikirmish, to remain in his position on the condition that he pay taxes, obey orders, and periodically attend meetings. However, Jikirmish did not comply and was negligent in his financial duties. In 1106, messages continued from the Emirs of the Levant seeking help from Sultan Muhammad against the Crusaders. The Sultan sent Jawali Saqawa to confront them and granted him Jikirmish's properties in Muharram September 1106 and appointed him Emir of Mosul. However, Jikirmish was not about to give up his domain easily.

== War ==
=== Battle of Kalba and Jikirmish's defeat ===
Jawali left Baghdad for Mosul in 1106, and advanced along the left bank of the Tigris River. He seized al-Bawazij along the way and plundered it, even though he had granted its inhabitants safe passage. He approached Erbil, so Jikirmish summoned his armies and prepared. Husam al-Din Abu'l-Hayja al-Kurdi, the Emir of Erbil, sent him a message informing him that he would be forced to ally with Jawali if Jikirmish did not come to his aid. Although his armies were not fully assembled, he went out with his available forces and crossed the Tigris quickly. Abu al-Hayja sent his soldiers and sons to him, and the forces of Mosul and the forces of Erbil met in the village of Kalba. Jikirmish's army had 2,000 soldiers, and Jawali's army had 1,000. Despite the numerical superiority, Jikirmish was defeated and captured after a strong attack by Jawali's army on the heart of Jikirmish's army. Guarding him was tightened. As for the armies that Jikirmish summoned, they arrived two days late, and on their way to Kalba, they found the defeated, and news of the defeat had likely reached them there. Upon news of the defeat reaching Mosul, the city's notables pledged allegiance to Zengi ibn Jikirmish and installed him as its ruler, despite him being only eleven years old. The custodian of the Mosul citadel, one of Jikirmish's Mamluks, Ghazghali, became very active, distributing horses and provisions to the soldiers. He summoned the Emir of Hilla, Sadaqa ibn Mazid; the Seljuk Sultan of Rum, Kilij Arslan I; and the Shahna of Baghdad, Aqsunqur al-Bursuqi, requesting their assistance and promising each of them that he would deliver Mosul to them. Jawali arrived in Mosul and besieged it with Karmawi ibn Khurasan al-Turkmani. Taking advantage of Jikirmish's captivity, he would parade him out daily on a mule, calling on the people of Mosul to open the gates, but no one heeded his pleas. He was returned each day to a pit where he was imprisoned to prevent anyone from abducting him. He eventually died at the age of 60.

=== Kilij Arslan's intervention in the war ===
As for the three messages that Ghazghali sent, they reached their intended recipients. Sadaqa ibn Mazid rejected Ghazghali's offer, adhering to his obedience to Sultan Muhammad. As for Kilij Arslan and Aqsunqur, they accepted and each of them went out with his forces to Mosul. When Kilij Arslan reached Nusaybin, Jawali heard of his arrival, so he lifted the siege on Mosul and left towards Sinjar. There, Ilghazi ibn Artuq joined him, and his army became 4,000 soldiers. As for Aqsunqur, he camped east of Mosul, but no one contacted him, so he returned on the same day. The people of Mosul sent word to Kilij Arslan while he was in Nusaybin, and they exchanged pledges and oaths with him. After he was reassured, Kilij Arslan entered Mosul on March 22, 1107. He was received by the companions of Jikirmish and his son Zengi in the al-Ma'rofa, and he bestowed gifts upon them. The sermon of Sultan Muhammad was removed and the sermon was delivered in the name of Kilij Arslan after the Caliph. He took possession of the fortress from Ghazghali and treated him well. As for Jawali, after leaving Mosul he went to Sinjar, then he headed to al-Rahba and arrived there in March 1107, and besieged it in May 19, 1107. During the siege, Jawali allied with Fakhr al-Mulk Ridwan, the Emir of Aleppo, and the latter joined him in the siege. After a conspiracy with the owners of one of the city's towers, Jawali succeeded in entering Nusaybin and looting it until noon, and its ruler, Muhammad ibn al-Sabbaq al-Shaybani, surrendered to him. Kilij Arslan appointed his son Malik Shah over Mosul, leaving with him an Emir named Idbar and a force to protect him, and went out to deal with Jawali.

The Seljuk army of Rum consisted of 4,000 well-equipped horsemen, but Jawali possessed a larger army. This caused concern among several of Kilij Arslan's commanders, who began to withdraw and return to their lands. The first of these was Ibrahim ibn Yinal, the ruler of Amid, followed by the Emir of Mayyafariqin and others. Kilij Arslan stalled Jawali until reinforcements arrived from Anatolia. When Kilij Arslan reached the Khabur River, his army numbered 5,000 soldiers, while Jawali's army numbered 4,000, including soldiers of Ridwan of Aleppo. Jawali's forces were more experienced and formidable than Kilij Arslan's. Taking advantage of the Sultan's incomplete reinforcements, Jawali launched an attack, and the battle erupted on July 13, 1107. Kilij Arslan led the attack, and although his initial assault was successful, he became preoccupied with the offensive and neglected his defense. The remainder of his army was defeated and plundered by Jawali and Ridwan's forces. Kilij Arslan realized that his rebellion would not be forgiven. Sultan of Rum, fearing he might get punished for challenging Sultan Muhammad's rule if he was captured, decided to try to escape. He threw himself into the Khabur River and kept shooting arrows at his pursuers, but his horse reached a deep point in the river and sank into it, and he drowned with it.

=== Jawali's capture of Mosul ===
After his overwhelming victory, Jawali headed to Mosul, and its people opened the gates to him without resistance, and the garrison of Kilij Arslan could not stop them. Jawali began to displace the companions and princes of Jikirmish who fought alongside Kilij Arslan and confiscated their money and property. Then he restored the sermon to Sultan Muhammad I and arrested Malik Shah ibn Kilij Arslan and sent him to Isfahan. Then he headed to Cizre, where Habashi ibn Jikirmish and Ghazghali were, and besieged them. They reached a peaceful solution after they paid him 6,000 dinars and gifts of animals and clothes.

== Aftermath ==
Thus, the entire Seljuk Emirate of Mosul came under the rule of Jawali Saqawa and, consequently, the Seljuk Empire. Jawali remained obedient to the Sultan until 1108 CE, when he himself rebelled and attempted to establish Mosul's independence. Meanwhile, Malik Shah of Rum, Kilij Arslan's son, remained a prisoner in Isfahan for three years, leaving the Seljuk throne of Rum vacant. It would not be filled until Malik Shah's return in 1110.
