= Battle of Turbessel (1108) =

- Part of Jawali Saqawa's levant campaign, Tancred-Baldwin Conflict, and Seljuk-Crusader War
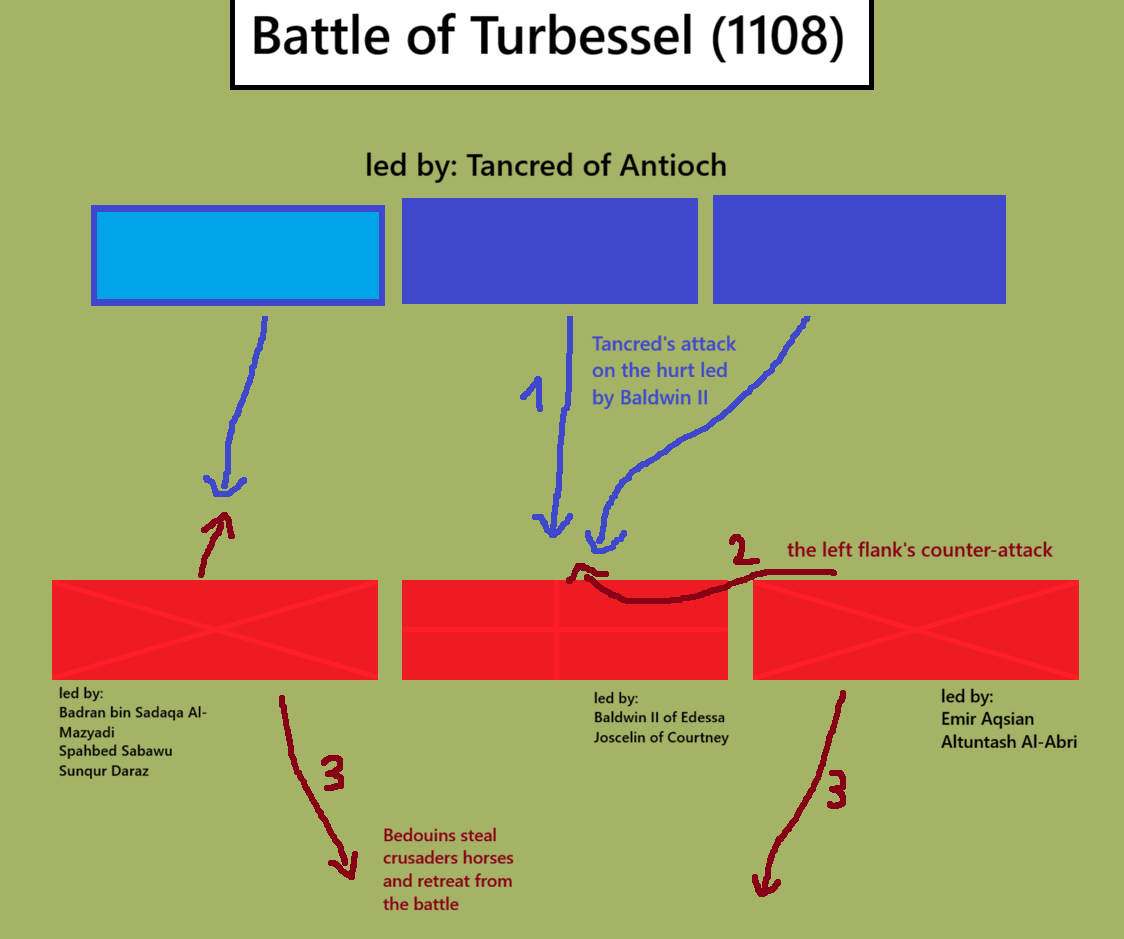
- Map showing the details of the battle
Date	September 1108
Location	Turbessel (modern-day Gündoğan, Oğuzeli, Turkey)
Result	Antioch-Aleppo victory: End of Jawali's adventure and campaigns in Levant; Tancred subjegates County of Edessa and Baldwin II

Belligerents
Principality of Antioch; Seljuk Sultanate of Aleppo	County of Edessa; Lordship of Turbessel; Jawali Saqawa's domains

Commanders and leaders
Tancred, Regent of Antioch	Jawali Saqawa; Baldwin II, Count of Edessa; Joscelin of Courtney, Lord of Turbessel; Emir Aqsian; Altuntash Al-Abri; Badran ibn Sadaqa Al-Mazyadi; Spahbed Sabawu; Sunqur Daraz

Strength
2,100 men: 1,500 soldiers; 600 soldiers	1,000-2,000 men: 500 Turkish soldiers; Several hundred crusader knights

Casualties and losses
Unknown, likely heavy	Heavy

The Battle of Turbessel (1108), was a Crusader conflict fought in Turbessel (present-day Turkey) between an alliance led by Baldwin II of Edessa, and Jawali Saqawa, and another alliance led by Tancred, Regent of Antioch, and Ridwan, Sultan of Aleppo. It is considered the first and one of the rarest battles of its kind in the history of the Crusades, as it involved a Muslim-Crusader alliance fighting another Muslim-Crusader alliance.

== Background ==
After the defeat of the Crusader states in the Battle of Harran in 1104, Baldwin II of Edessa, was captured by Sokmen ibn Artuq and then became a prisoner of Shams al-Dawla Jikirmish, the Emir of Mosul. Baldwin remained a prisoner for five years, until the new Emir of Mosul, Jawali Saqawa, rebelled against Sultan Muhammad I Tapar. After he left the city in the management of his wife, Jawali took Baldwin and left. He then released him in Makesin in exchange for a ransom of 70,000 dinars and the release of Muslim prisoners. After 20,000 were paid, he took Baldwin's cousin, Joscelin of Courtenay, Lord of Turbessel, as a hostage in his place. Joscelin was then released to help Baldwin collect the rest of the ransom, and his and Baldwin's brothers-in-law were taken as hostages in his place.

Throughout Baldwin’s absence, Tancred, the regent of the Principality of Antioch, ruled in his place. However, after Baldwin’s return, Tancred refused to hand over Edessa to him, which led to a conflict between them that ended with the intervention of Bernard, Patriarch of Antioch, who ruled in favor of Baldwin. Tancred withdrew due to the strength of Baldwin’s allies, and thus the latter regained his county and took possession of it on September 18, 1108, but no agreement was met and the conflict would continue. After that, Baldwin implemented the conditions of his release and handed over a sum of ransom and prisoners. Baldwin allowed Muslims to reside in Suruç and rebuilt mosques, and he killed its judge who had insulted Islam in order to strengthen his alliance with Jawali.

As for Jawali, after releasing Baldwin, he began to consider attacking Hillah in cooperation with Badran and Mansur, the sons of Sadaqa ibn Mansour, the slain Emir of Hillah. However, Spahbed Sabawu persuaded him to abandon this plan and head to the Levant, pointing that it was far from the Sultan's zone and weakened by the Crusades. Salim ibn Malik al-Uqayli, the Emir of Qal'at Ja'bar, sought Jawali's aid, informing him that the Banu Numayr had seized Raqqa, which was ruled by his son, Ali ibn Salim. News also arrived that Fakhr al-Mulk Ridwan, the Sultan of Aleppo, had attacked a Crusader caravan carrying part of the ransom money for Baldwin and that he had collected tribute from the people of Raqqa after Banu Numayr negotiated with him. Jawali indeed marched and besieged Raqqa to return it to Salim ibn Malik, but he ended the siege after seventy days in exchange for the Banu Numayr providing him with money and horses. After failing to break the siege of Mosul using messengers sent by the sultan to negotiate a truce, Jawali attacked the city of Balis, part of Ridwan's realm, on September 22 1108, besieging it, then plundering the city and massacring its inhabitants.

After Jawali attacked and captured the city of Balis, he became a real threat to the Seljuks of Aleppo. The Sultan of Aleppo, Fakhr al-Mulk Ridwan, contacted Tancred, the regent of Antioch, offering him an alliance against Jawali. Tancred agreed and marched out with his armies, with Ridwan sending him six hundred soldiers as support. When Jawali learned of this, he sent to his ally, Baldwin II, asking for his help and releasing him from paying the rest of the ransom. They met in the city of Manbij, and there news reached Jawali of the Sultan's army's victory after a long siege of the city of Mosul. Thus, Jawali lost his position, as well as his treasuries and wealth within the city. The emirs began to abandon him, including Atabeg Zengi ibn Aq Sunqur and Bektash al-Nahawandi. Nevertheless, Jawali's army still had about 500 Turks and more Bedouins, then after Baldwin arrived with several hundred knights, the army was made up of 1-2,000 men. Afterwards, they left Manbij and camped at Turbessel. There, Tancred approached them with his forces consisting of 1500 men, in addition to the supporting forces that Ridwan had sent.

== Battle ==
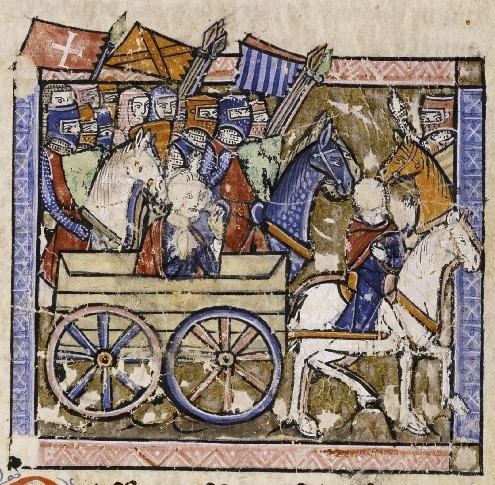
Joscelin of Courtney, carried by his men on a litter, marching to battle.

Baldwin and Jawali’s army prepared and took up their fighting positions. The right flank of the army was commanded by Emir Aqsian, Altuntash Al-Abri, and others. The left flank was commanded by Emir Badran ibn Sadaqa Al-Mazyadi, Spahbed Sabawu, and Sunqur Daraz. In the center of the army, command was taken by Count Baldwin II and Lord Jocselin. Jawali's position in the battle is not known.

The fighting began, and the army of Antioch attacked the center of Baldwin and Jawali’s army, while the right flank clashed with the rest of Tancred’s forces, including the forces of Aleppo. Tancred’s knights succeeded in breaking Baldwin’s knights, but the left flank of Baldwin and Jawali’s army attacked Tancred’s warriors and almost defeated them. However, Jawali’s soldiers stole the horses of their allies from the County of Edessa and fled from the battle, because they had lost hope in Jawali completely, especially after his loss of Mosul. After he realized that he had lost all his vassals, Jawali withdrew from the battle, and Baldwin and Joscelin fled. Tancred was victorious, and many Muslims were killed on Jawali and Baldwin’s side, and their money and property were looted.

== Aftermath ==
After the defeat, Jawali headed to al-Rahba, while Spahbed Sabawu marched to Sham, and Badran ibn Sadaqa sought refuge in Qal'at Ja'bar, and later joined Mawdud, the new Emir of Mosul who honored him and took him for a friend. Baldwin and Joscelin returned to Turbessel, where their wounded Muslim allies sought shelter with them. They treated and cared for the wounded before sending them back to their countries. In al-Rahba, Jawali was nearly captured by the forces of Mawdud. These forces were engaged in a battle with Bedouin tribes, and had they not been preoccupied with fighting, they would have discovered his presence and arrested him. Jawali felt that he would only be safe if he returned to the Sultan and pledged his allegiance. This was accomplished through the mediation of Husayn ibn Qatghalaktin, allowing Jawali to return to the Sultan Muhammad's court as he had been before his rule over Mosul. Baldwin and Joscelin faced greater difficulty in returning to the pre-battle situation. They had lost all their soldiers and could no longer defend the county. They were forced to submit to Tancred, and although he did not remove all of Baldwin's titles, he stripped him of all real political autonomy and turned him into a vassal. Baldwin did not regain his strength until he sought help from Baldwin I, King of Jerusalem, who restored Edessa's independence in the Council of Tripoli and forced Tancred to give up any claims to rule the county. This battle also led to a rise of hatred between the Armenians and the Crusaders, who were fed up with Crusader rule and tried to bring Kogh Vasil, the ruler of Raban and Kisum to power as their ruler, but Baldwin exposed and punished them.
