= Jawali Saqawa =

- Emir of Mosul, Emir of Fars, Atabeg
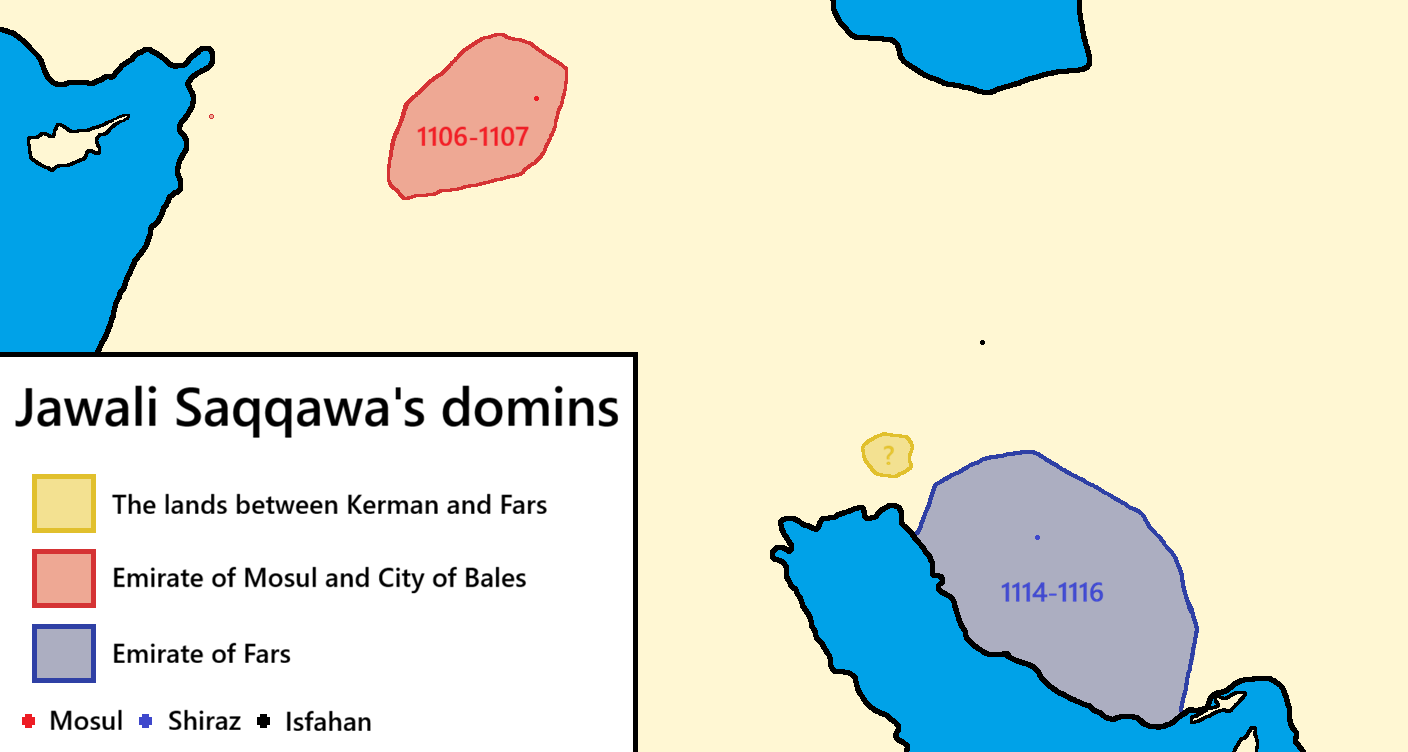
- A map showing all the lands that were ruled by Jawali Saqawah.

Emir of Mosul
- Reign: September 1106 - April 1108; 1107 - September 1108 (de facto)
- Predecessor: Malik Shah of Rum
- Successor: Mawdud

Emir of Fars
- Reign: c. 1114 - 1116
- Born: Unknown
- Died: 1116; Fars Province
- Spouse: Daughter of Bursuq the Elder
- Issue: unnamed son
- Religion: Sunni Muslim

Jawali Saqawa, was a Turkoman adventurer and general, ruled as Emir of Mosul from 1106 to 1108, and then ruled as Emir of Fars from 1114 to 1116.

== Biography ==
=== Reign over the lands between Fars and Khuzestan ===
Jawali's birth location and date are unknown, the first time he appeard in history was in the late decades of the fifth Hijri century (11th century). Jawali seized the lands between Khuzestan and Fars (modern-day Kohgiluyeh and Boyer-Ahmad province), stayed there for years, built up its fortresses and strongholds, and mistreated its people, cutting off their hands, mutilating their noses, and gouging out their eyes.

In 1102, during Jawali's rule over these lands, the Nizaris seized fortresses in Khuzestan, Fars, and the areas between them, and their crimes grew, disrupting trade routes in those regions. A group of Jawali's followers defected and joined them, gaining their trust. Then Jawali pretended that he would leave his territories because they would be attacked by Banu Bursuq, and that he would take refuge in Hamadan. The defectors from Jawali’s companions advised the Assassins to attack him on the road to take his money. They agreed and went out to cut his road with 300 men, but when they arrived, Jawali’s former followers switched sides and stabbed the Nizaris in the back, killing them and looting their weapons and horses. Ibn al-Athir claimed that only three of them survived and fled to the mountain.

The Seljuk Empire was in a state of civil war, and therefore no one dealt with Jawali. But after the war ended and Sultan Muhammad I Tapar took over, he sent Mawdud ibn Altuntakin to confront him. Jawali was besieged for eight months, until Jawali sent word to the Sultan informing him that he would not surrender to Mawdud but would surrender to any other commander. Indeed, Sultan Muhammad changed the commanders, and then Jawali surrendered and went to Isfahan. He became in the court of Sultan Muhammad and a servant of his. In 1106, Sultan Muhammad appointed him Emir of Mosul.

=== Emir of Mosul and Rebellion ===
At that time, Shams al-Dawla Jikirmish, the deposed Emir of Mosul, refused to give up his position, thus Jawali had to fight for Mosul. Jawali left Baghdad for Mosul in November 1106, seizing and plundering al-Bawazij despite having granted its inhabitants safety if they surrender. He then proceeded to Erbil, where its emir, Husam al-Din Abu al-Hayja, had allied himself with Jikirmish. Their forces clashed at the village of Kalba, where Jawli attacked and defeated them, capturing Jikirmish. Jawali then advanced and besieged Mosul, attempting to use Jikirmish by parading him around daily, as he would call upon his followers to open the city gates. However, they did not listen, and Jikirmish eventually died at the age of 60. The people of Mosul sought help from Kilij Arslan I, Sultan of Rum. When Jawali learned of his arrival, he ended the siege and went to Sinjar to ally with Fakhr al-Mulk Ridwan, the Sultan of Aleppo. He then besieged al-Rahba, seized it, and its ruler surrendered to him. When the news reached Kilij Arslan, he went out to confront him, and they met in the Battle of Khabur River, in 13 July 1107, where Jawali was victorious and Kilij Arslan drowned and died. Jawali then entered Mosul without resistance and sent Malik Shah of Rum to Isfahan, and he subdued Cizre.

The Sultan rewarded Jawali and allowed him to rule all the lands he conquered, but this made him arrogant, and he began to refrain from fulfilling his financial obligations, and refused to respond to the Sultan’s invitation, and in the end he declared an outright rebellion against the Sultan, so Muhammad I sent a large army to him, including an army led Mawdud ibn Altuntakin, to besiege him. When Jawali learned of this, he fortified the city and left it under the command of his wife, then he plundered the farms around Mosul, and took Baldwin II, Count of Edessa, who was a prisoner of the Muslims, and left Mosul heading towards the Artuqids, later in April 1108, the siege started.

=== Jawali's campaign and adventures in Levant ===
Jawali headed to Nusaybin and offered Ilghazi ibn Artuq an alliance against the Seljuk Sultan, but he refused and left for Mardin, leaving his son in Nusaybin with orders to attack Jawali if he returned again. When Jawali learned of his departure, he went to Dara and sent a messenger to Ilghazi, but he followed the messenger after him, and when he arrived, Jawali had arrived with him, to try to ally with Ilghazi again. When Ilghazi saw Jawali's trust in him, he agreed, and they camped in Nusaybin and besieged Sinjar. After they failed to enter it, they headed to Al-Rahba, on the road they reached Araban (a city on the banks of the Khabur) and camped there, Ilghazi fled at night and returned to his realm.

Despite Ilghazi's escape, Jawli continued his journey. When he reached Maxin, he released Baldwin II for 70,000 dinars and freed the Muslim prisoners in Edessa. He sent him to the fortress of Ja'bar, ruled by Salim bin Malik al-Uqaili. There, Jocelyn de Courtenay, Lord of Telbacher and cousin of Naldoin, came and released him, paying 20,000 dinars of the ransom and surrendering himself as a hostage until the rest was paid. Then Jawli released Jocelyn and exchanged him for his relative and Baldwin's relative, ordering him to go and help Baldwin, and sent some of his men with him.

After Jawali released Baldwin in Makesin, he headed to Al-Rahba and on his way he met Abu Al-Najm Badran and Abu Kamil Mansour, the sons of Sayf Al-Dawla Sadaqa bin Mansour Al-Mazyadi, the former Emir of Hillah who was recently killed by the Seljuks. He allied with them and promised to attack Al-Rahba with them. They decided to pledge allegiance to a Seljuk Emir named Bektash ibn Bektash ibn Alp Arslan as their Sultan. At that time, Spahbed Sabawu, the Emir of Al-Rahba, came to them and advised Jawali to leave Iraq and head to the Levant because it was far from the Sultan and because it was in a state of chaos due to the Crusaders. Jawali listened to his words and changed his destination.

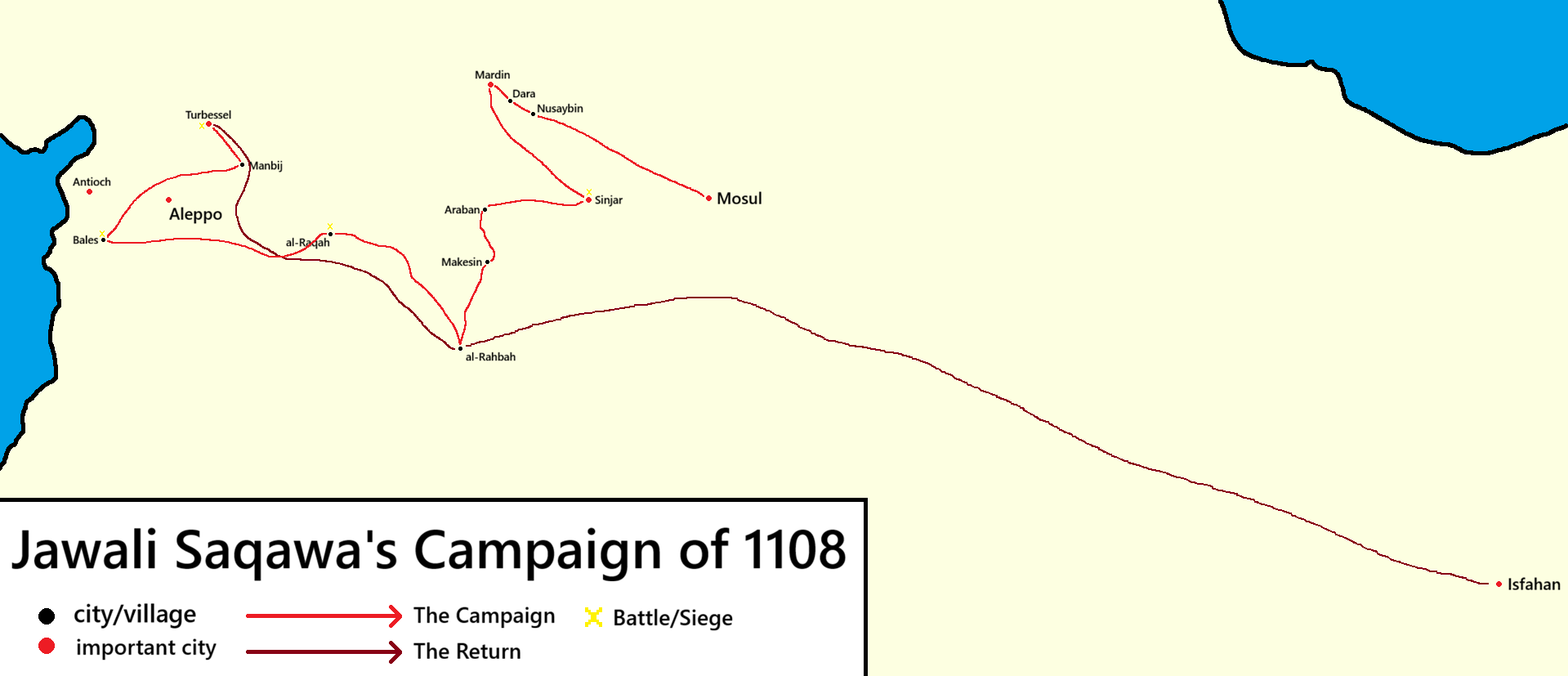
A map showing the course of Jawali Saqawa's campaign in 1108

Messengers arrived to Jawali from Salim ibn Malik al-Uqayli, the Emir of Qal’at Ja’bar, informing him that the city of Raqqa, which was ruled by his son Ali, had been attacked by Banu Numayr, led by Jawshan al-Numayri, who had seized the city and killed its ruler, Ali ibn Salim. Fakhr al-Mulk Ridwan, had also attacked a Crusader caravan that was transporting part of the ransom for Baldwin that was to be paid to Jawali. Ridwan also attacked Raqqa, but he made an agreement with Banu Numayr that they would pay him tribute. When Jawali learned of this, he went and besieged Raqqa for seventy days. In the end, he made peace with Banu Numayr in exchange for them supplying him with money and horses. He told Salim bin Malik that he was busy with more important matters, and that if he returned to Iraq and succeeded in his plans, he would compensate Salim for the loss of Raqqa, and that he would not concern himself with “besieging some five men from Banu Numayr”.

Then Emir Hasan ibn Atabeg Qatghalaktin arrived to Jawali with Fakhr al-Mulk ibn Ammar with a message from Sultan Muhammad I Tabar. The Sultan ordered Jawali to go to jihad with Ibn Ammar and ordered him to hand over his regions to the Sultan. He reassured him and told him that if he returned to obedience, he would reward him. Jawali replied, saying: I am the Sultan’s mamluk and I am in his obedience. Then sent him gifts and clothes. Then Jawali told Hasan ibn Qatghalaktin to go and order the commanders to lift the siege on Mosul. In return, he would send one of his men to give him his son as a hostage and would leave the appointment of the Emir of Mosul to the Sultan. The plan almost succeeded as most of the siege commanders withdrew, except for Mawdud, who insisted on staying and arrested Jawli’s follower.

Jawali then headed to the city of Balis, which belonged to Ridwan and the Seljuks of Aleppo, and attacked it on September 22, 1108. Ridwan’s followers fled from the city while the people took refuge behind its walls. Jawali besieged it for five days, and then on September 26, Jawali succeeded in piercing one of the towers, causing it to collapse on the Naqqabin and killing a group of them. After he seized the city, Jawali crucified a group of its notables and executed Qadi Muhammad bin Abdul Aziz bin Ilyas, and looted the country and took a lot of money.

When news reached Ridwan, he allied himself with Tancred, the Regent of Antioch, against Jawali. Upon learning of this, Jawali contacted his ally, Baldwin II, and released him from paying the remainder of the ransom. Jawali and Baldwin met in Manbij, where news arrived that the siege of Mosul had ended in victory for the Sultan's forces, and that Mawdud had entered the city and seized Jawali's treasury and wealth. This news greatly weakened Jawali, and he began to lose the trust of his followers. Some of them actually deserted him, such as Atabeg Zengi ibn Aq Sunqur and Bektash al-Nahawandi. Despite this, Jawali retained a thousand horsemen and encamped with Baldwin at Turbessel. There, Tancred attacked them, and a major battle ensued. It almost ended in a victory for Jawali and Baldwin, but the Bedouins in Jawali's army fled after stealing the horses of their allies from the Edessa. Jawali then withdrew, and his former friends dispersed. Jawali then headed to al-Rahba and remained nearby. After he was nearly discovered by some of the Mawdud’s soldiers, Jawali decided to return to the Sultan and his court. Jawali went to Isfahan in disguise and quickly and arrived after seventeen days. Through the mediation of Hasan bin Qatghalaktin, Sultan Muhammad allowed Jawali to return to his entourage. Jawali, in turn, handed over Bektash ibn Bektash the Seljuk Prince to be executed, whom Jawli had wanted to crown as a Sultan in the past.

=== Emir of Fars ===
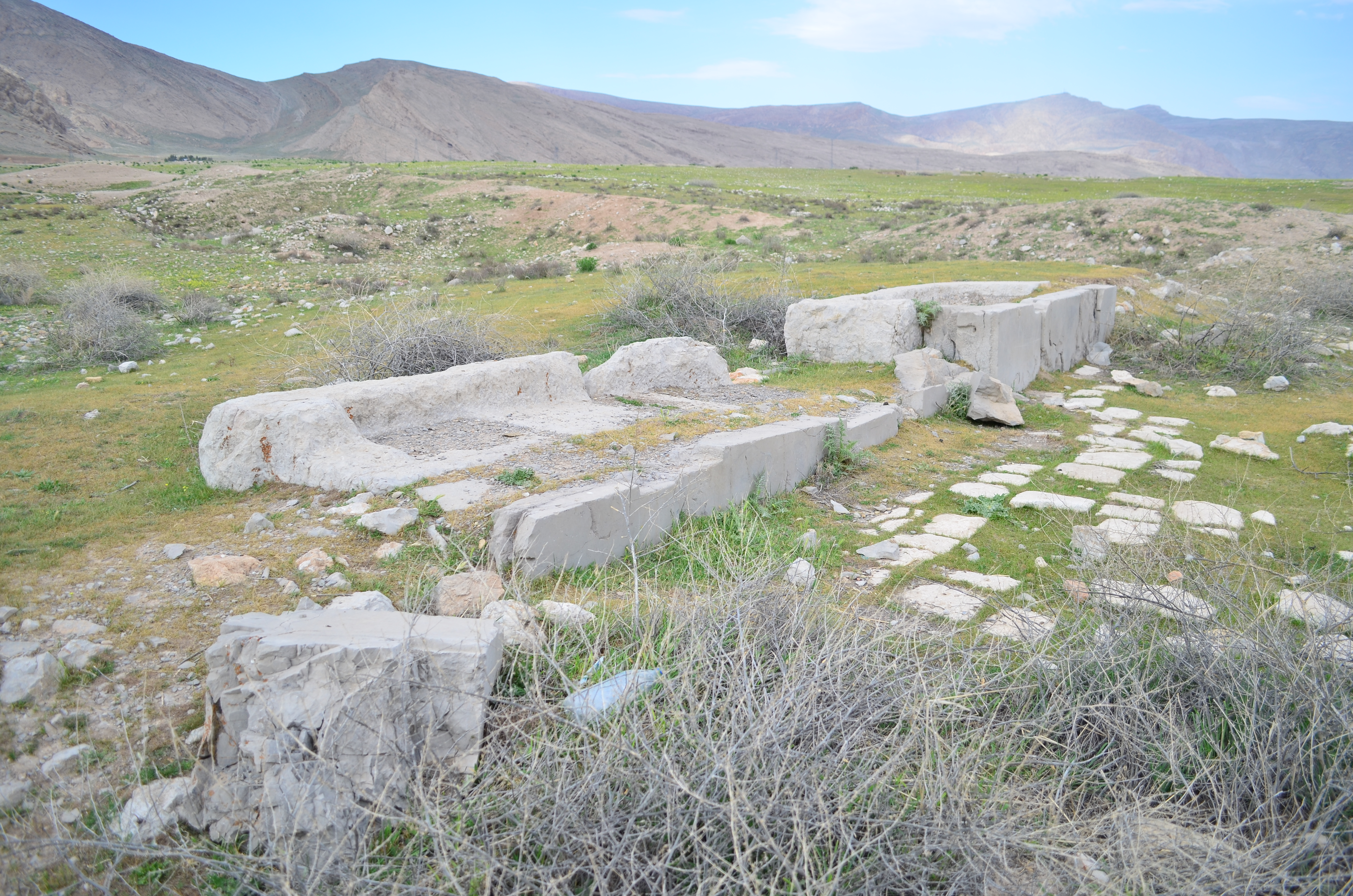
The ruins of Istakhr.

Upon Jawali's return to Sultan Muhammad's court, the latter granted him Fars region as a fiefdom, ordering him to reform it and suppress corruption. He sent his two-year-old son, Jaghri ibn Muhammad, with him to raise him as his atabeg. According to Ibn al-Athir, when Jawali arrived, he taught the young prince to say "Take him" in Persian. He then summoned Emir Baldaji, the powerful ruler of Kalil and Sarmah, who had also been a Mamluk of Malik Shah. When Baldaji entered, young Jaghri, as was his custom, said in Persian, "Take him", so Baldaji was arrested, executed, and his wealth plundered. Baldaji's deputy in the fortress of Istakhr where Baladji's family and possessions were located, al-Jurhumi, rebelled against Jawali who besieged him, defeated him, then Jawali himself transferred his wealth to Istakhr.

Jawli then invited al-Hasan ibn al-Mubariz, also known as Khosrow, Emir of the Shabankara and ruler of Fasa, to come and serve Jaghri, the sultan's son. Despite Khosrow's assurances of allegiance to the sultan and his continued payment of taxes, he refused to come, fearing a fate similar to that of Baldaji. Jawali realized that Khosrow's presence threatened his position as the Emir of Fars, so he feigned a return to the sultan, gathered his belongings, and set out. When al-Hasan ibn al-Mubariz learned of this, he was reassured and sat drinking until he fell asleep intoxicated. Jawali, however, returned and marched towards Khosrow with a small army, launching a swift attack. After being awakened by his brother Fadlaw, Khosrow fled to his fortress, nestled between two mountains, one of which was called Unju. Jawli plundered Khosrow's possessions and killed many of his followers and the rest fled to Kerman. He then advanced and captured Fasa, continuing his campaign of pillaging across Fars. Among the cities he looted was Jahrom. He then besieged Khosrow in his fortress, but the siege ended with a truce after Jawali, recognizing the fortress's strength, realized it would hold for a long time before falling. Then Jawli headed to Shiraz and stayed there for a while, then he captured Kazerun.

Then Jawali besieged Abu Sa'd Muhammad bin Mamma in his fortress, and the siege lasted for two years. Jawali tried to send messengers to negotiate peace with Abu Sa'd, but he killed them. When he sent some Sufis to negotiate with him again, he pretended to welcome them and feeding them, then he brutally killed them. In the end, Muhammad bin Mamma surrendered and handed over his fortress, but Jawali mistreated him, so he fled. Jawali took his sons hostage and sent squads to pursue him. After they captured a black servant who was transporting food to Abu Saad, he was finally captured in a mountain pass and executed.

In 1115, Jawali headed to besiege Dar Abjard, whose ruler was named Ibrahim. He fled to his son-in-law or brother-in-law, Arslan Shah I, and asked him for help. Jawali went and besieged the fortress of Ratil Ranneh, to which the inhabitants of Dar Abjard had taken refuge. It was a strong fortress on the top of a mountain located in a valley about two parasang long. When Jawali saw the strength of the fortress, he headed towards Kerman and then returned from it pretending that he was from the Seljuk army of Kerman. Those in the fortress allowed him to enter, believing that he was a commander sent by Arslan Shah and that he had come to help. After he entered, he killed those in the fortress and looted their money, and only a few survived. After that, he returned to his camp.

==== Fars-Kerman War (1115) ====
Then Jawali summoned Khosrow to join him in the invasion of the Seljuk Sultanate of Kerman, and sent to Arslan Shah I asking him to return the Shubankara because they were vassals to the Sultan and threatening to invade his land if he did not. Arslan responded with a messenger saying that he would not hand over the refugees but asked for intercession for them. Before Jawali sent the messenger back, he honored him, recruited him, and turned him into a spy for him, and asked him to move the Kerman army away from the borders. The messenger returned to Sirjan, where the army and its commander, who was the vizier, were. The messenger convinced the vizier that the presence of the Kerman army on the borders frightened Jawali and made his enemies feel that he was weak, and that it was better to return the army to Kerman. This was done, and then Jawali went and besieged Faraj, which is the border between Fars and Kerman. Arslan Shah suspected the messenger and reprimanded him, and he apologized, but the vizier did more than that and tortured a servant of Jawali's men who was with the messenger, so he confessed to everything. The messenger and the servant were crucified and their money was confiscated as punishment for treason. Then preparations for war began, with an army of 6,000 soldiers assembled. The border official was a cunning man named Musa, and he asked the army not to take the usual route because Jawli was monitoring the known routes. Instead, he led them through secret and difficult routes through the mountains and straits. During this time, Jawali was preoccupied with the siege of Faraj and had become addicted to drinking alcohol. His addiction increased after he sent out reconnaissance teams that did not find any armies coming from Kerman, so he was reassured. But the reason for this was that the Seljuk army of Kerman was crossing secret routes that Jawali did not know. When they reached Faraj, they attacked it at night while Jawli was drunk and asleep. One of his followers tried to wake him up and tell him what had happened, but Jawli cut out his tongue. But when another follower woke him up and confirmed the news, Jawli fled, and his army collapsed, with many killed and captured. This defeat occurred in March 1115.

=== Death ===
Although only al-Hasan ibn al-Mubariz “Khosrow” and Ithe son of Muhammad ibn Mamma remained with him, and they were people who had good reasons to take revenge on him, they did not kill him and assured him that they would not betray him and that he would see nothing but good and peace from them. Indeed, they accompanied him to the city of Fasa, and there the remnants of his army joined him, and the Sultan of Kerman released the prisoners of Jawali’s soldiers that he had, and they returned to their leader. When Jawli began to prepare for another campaign against Kerman, Jaghri son of Sultan Muhammad died in April-May 1116 at the age of five, and this weakened Jawali’s power and his position as Atabeg and Emir of Fars. Sultan of Kerman, Arslan Shah I, contacted Sultan Muhammad I Tabar, asking him to stop Jawali, but the Sultan told Arslan that Jawali must be appeased and given the fortress of Faraj, and the Sultan’s messenger returned with the message in July-August 1116. In the end, Jawli died suddenly in 1116, and the reasons for his death and the place of his burial are unknown.

== Domains ==
At the beginning of his career, Jawali seized all the lands between Ramhormoz and Arjan, and ruled them and losing them to the Seljuks. After moving to Sultan Muhammed's cort, he was appointed Emir of Mosul in 1106, according to Ibn al-Athir, his domain of control contained the whole Jazira and even Diyarbakir, during his campaign to assure his position as ruler of Mosul he captured al-Rahba. During his Leavant campaign, he sieged and captured Balis, after a small amount of time Mosul fell and Jawali lost the Emirate of Mosul. After that Jawali was appointed Emir of Fars and given the Emirate of Fars, during his reign Jawali capture lands from the local rulers like, like Kalil and Sarmah which he took from Emir Baldeji, after killing him, and Abu Sa'id Mammaafter defeating him, and Dar Abjerd, but he failed to seize the Sultanate of Kerman.

Regnal titles
Preceded by Shams al-Dawla Jikirmish	Emir of Mosul; 1106-1108	Succeeded by Mawdud ibn al-Tuntakin
Preceded by	Emir of Fars; 1114-1116	Succeeded by
Preceded by	Atabeg of Emir Jeghri; 1114–1116	Succeeded by
Preceded by	Governor of Ramhormoz and Arjan; 1099–1106	Succeeded by

== Bibliography ==
- Runciman, Steven (1987) [1952]. A History of the Crusades, Volume II: The Kingdom of Jerusalem and the Frankish East. Vol. 2. Cambridge: Cambridge University Press. ISBN 9780521347716.
- Setton, Kenneth M.; Baldwin, Marshall W., eds. (1969) [1955]. A History of the Crusades, Volume I: The First Hundred Years. Vol. 1 (Second ed.). Madison, Milwaukee, and London: University of Wisconsin Press. ISBN 0-299-04834-9.
