= Battle of Khabur River (1107) =

Seljuk victory in the War of Mosul

- Part of War of Mosul (1106-1107)
Date	13 July 1107
Location	The Banks of Khabur River
Result	Seljuk Sultanate victory

Belligerents
Seljuk Sultanate of Rum	Seljuk Empire; Seljuk Sultanate of Aleppo

Commanders and leaders
Kilij Arslan I †	Jawali Saqawa

Strength
5,000 cavalry	4,000 cavalry

Casualties and losses
Heavy	Unknown

The Battle of Khabur River, was a battle that took place in the 1107, between the Sultan of Rum, Kilij Arslan I, and the Seljuk emir of Mosul, Jawali Saqawa, and with him the Sultan of Aleppo, Fakhr al-Mulk Ridwan. It ended with the defeat and death of Kilij Arslan by drowning.

== Background ==
In the year 1106, Muhammad I Tapar, Sultan of the Seljuks, dismissed his Atabeg of Mosul, Shams al-Dawla Jikirmish, and replaced him with Jawali Saqawa. A battle took place between them in which Jawali won and captured Jikirmish. Then he besieged Mosul, so the custodian of its fortress, Ghazghali, sought help from several important figures, promising to hand over Mosul to them, including Kilij Arslan I, the Sultan of Rum. Indeed, the latter agreed and went out to Mosul and entered it after taking oaths of loyalty from its people, while Jawali lifted the siege and left and seized Nusaybin. Kilij Arslan decided to leave Mosul to go out and deal with him, and he appointed his young son Malik Shah as Emir of Mosul.

== The Advance ==
Kilij Arslan's army had four thousand soldiers equipped with the best weapons, armor, and horses, but their small numbers compared to Jawali's army made Kilij's emirs afraid, and many of the emirs withdrew, the first of whom was Ibrahim ibn Yinal, the Emir of Amid, who left his tents and belongings and returned to his country, and many followed him. Kilij Arslan sent to his sultanate requesting reinforcements with soldiers, and he stalled and avoided fighting Jawali during that period, and this succeeded, and when he reached the Khabur River, his army increased by another thousand, meaning that he had five thousand soldiers, while Jawali's army had four thousand, including the soldiers of Fakhr al-Mulk Ridwan, the Sultan of Aleppo and Jawali's ally. Despite the small number of his soldiers, his armies were more experienced and fierce, so Jawali decided to attack Kilij Arslan before more supplies reached him.

== Battle ==
The meeting took place at Khabur River in July 13, 1107. Kilij Arslan led the attack himself until the clash occurred. Kilij Arslan cut off the hand of the enemy army's standard-bearer, and Sultan Muhammad I's banner fell. Kilij Arslan entered deep into the army until he reached Jawali and struck him with his sword. Despite his success in penetrating his stuffed armor, he did not hit him. While Kilij Arslan was busy attacking, he forgot to defend himself. Jawali's forces attacked the Army of Rum, defeated them, and looted them. Kilij Arslan fled to the Khabur River, believing that he would not be forgiven for trying to challenge the Sultan. He entered the river with his horse and kept shooting with his bow at those who pursued him until the horse plunged into the depths and he drowned.

== Aftermath ==
After his victory, Jawali advanced to Mosul and entered it without resistance after its inhabitants opened the gates for him. Malik Shah of Rum was arrested and sent to Sultan Muhammad I in Isfahan, while Jawali assumed control over Mosul. The Seljuk Sultanate of Rum remained in turmoil until Malik Shah's return three years after the battle. As for Kilij Arslan, his body was discovered days after the battle and buried in Shamsaniyah, a village on the Khabur River.
