= Battle of Mersivan =

Battle between the Crusaders and the Turks

- Part of Crusades
Date	August 1101
Location	Mersivan, now called Merzifon
Result	Seljuk victory

Belligerents
Sultanate of Rum; Danishmend	Holy Roman Empire; Kingdom of France; Byzantine Empire

Commanders and leaders
Kilij Arslan I Gazi Gümüshtigin; Fakhr al-Mulk Ridwan	Raymond I of Tripoli; Stephen of Blois; Stephen I, Count of Burgundy; Anselm IV of Milan; Odo I of Burgundy; Joscelin I of Edessa

Strength
20,000	Larger than Seljuks.

Casualties and losses
Unknown	Unknown

The Battle of Mersivan was fought between the European Crusaders and the Seljuk Turks led by Kilij Arslan I in Northern Anatolia during the Crusade of 1101. The Turks decisively defeated the Crusaders, who lost an estimated four-fifths of their army near the mountains of Paphlagonia at Mersivan (Mersifon).

As the Crusaders were marching towards Mersivan they were organized into five divisions, the Lombards and Italians in the front led by Anselm IV who was followed by Raymond IV of Toulouse with Pecheneg cavalry. After Raymond were the Burgundians led by Count Stephen I of Burgundy and Duke Odo I of Burgundy. Behind the Burgundians came the Germans led by the German constable Conrad followed by the French led by Stephen of Blois. The army moved sluggishly as all the soldiers, camp followers, and horses were all weak. Due to the massive size of the army, communication between each of the contingents was slow, making the march discoordinated. As the army marched towards Mersivan, they had found themselves surrounded by a Seljuk army led by Kilij Arslan I himself who quickly surrounded the Crusaders in order to block off any routes of escape. In reaction to the Turks, the Crusaders created a camp inside the encirclement and filled it with the camp followers while the soldiers deployed themselves around the perimeter of the camp with the intention of protecting it. During the first of these, which fell on a Friday, the Turkish archers positioned themselves on the various flanks of the camp; from there, while emitting "ferocious shouts", they unleashed intense volleys of arrows, then hastily retreated to make room for other groups who, from a different position, repeated the same tactic. However, the Crusaders defended valiantly, fending off attack over attack over attack while staying in formation, despite the problem of language barriers between the multinational force.

On the next day, the German constable, Conrad unsuccessfully led a group of German crusaders in an attempt to break the Seljuk lines. Not only did he fail, but he was cut off by the Turks from the Crusader lines. The Turks moved in to destroy the isolated German group, killing many, but Conrad and the remaining Germans were able take refuge in a nearby castle. As the rest of the Crusaders awaited Conrad’s return, many of them feared that he had abandoned them like how Hugh and Stephen had done in the First Crusade.

On the third day, a Sunday, nothing eventful happened. The next day, Anselm preached to the Crusaders with the Holy Lance from the Siege of Antioch and with a relic of Saint Ambrose before the Italian crusaders attempted to break through the Seljuk lines from the east. Although they inflicted many Turkish casualties, they suffered many casualties as well, forcing them to withdraw. On the fifth day of the battle, Kilij Arslan was joined by some Danishmendid princes and the Turkmen Emir of Aleppo, Fakhr al-Mulk Ridwan. Along with them came many Syrian Turkmen and Danishmendid troops. With their army augmented, the Turks launched an attack, annihilating the tired and demoralized Crusaders. The attack routed Lombards, with Albert of Biandrate fleeing with many Italian knights, abandoning their camp followers. The Italian infantry tried to follow suit but they were no match for the swift Turkish horses and were attacked one by one by them. Meanwhile the Pechenegs abandoned the fight. At this point of the battle, the Turks were attacking the Crusaders from all sides and were entering the camp as the French and German crusaders were forced to fall back. In the chaos, Raymond was trapped underneath a rock and was rescued by the Stephens of Burgundy and Blois. Conrad, managed to rejoin the battle from his castle with his Germans but the course of battle was unchanged, more and more Crusaders fell and the remaining Crusaders lost more and more cohesion as chaos spread. The battle continued into the next day, when the Crusader camp was captured and the knights fled, leaving women, children, and priests behind to be killed or enslaved. The Crusaders who did not possess many horses, mostly the Lombards, were not able to retreat that far from the Turks, and were hunted like wild game. Those who managed to escape were mainly the knights and nobles who had horses. After the battle, most of the old men and women and children were all killed. Those camp followers and warriors who did not die, but got captured, were sent into slavery. Among the more than 50,000 casualties was Odo I of Burgundy, who was killed in battle. The Holy Lance found by Peter Bartholomew during the Siege of Antioch was also captured by Kilij Arslan.. After the Battle of Mersivan, the Franco-Lombard expedition of Raymond of Toulouse, Anselm of Milan, and Stephen of Blois was basically destroyed.[52]

One of the Crusaders who managed to escape the calamity was Raymond IV of Toulouse. He, with a small escort including Stephen of Blois and Stephen of Burgundy, managed to reach the small Byzantine-Paphlagonian port of Bafra, a city at the mouth of the Halys River, where they managed to get on a small ship to Constantinople.[53] Other knights who managed to escape went to Sinope, from where they were also able to sail to Constantinople. Anselm IV of Milan was able to escape to Constantinople to nurse his injuries where he would soon die. Much of the Crusaders blamed the failure of the Crusade on Alexios and the Byzantines. In reality, Alexios was furious at the Crusade's failure. Although he received Raymond and his companions with courtesy, he was very cold and did not hide his disappointment at all.

== Sources ==
- Runciman, Steven (1987). A History of the Crusades. CUP Archive. ISBN 9780521347716.
- Gillespie, Alexander (2011). A History of the Laws of War: Volume 1. Bloomsbury. ISBN 9781847318619.
- Gillespie, Alexander (2011). A History of the Laws of War: Volume 3. Bloomsbury. ISBN 9781847318411.
