= Bursuq =

Bursuq may refer to:

- Bursuq the Elder (d. 1097), Seljuk military leader
- Bursuq II (d. 1116/7), emir of Hamadan
