= Malik Shah of Rum =

Seljuk Sultan of Rum

Malik Shah

Sultan of Rum
- Reign: 1110–1116
- Predecessor: Kilij Arslan I
- Successor: Mesud I

Emir of Mosul
- Reign: 1107 (a few months)
- Predecessor: Zengi ibn Jikirmish
- Successor: Jawali Saqawa
- Born: 1096
- Died: 1116 (aged 19–20); Konya
- Burial: Alâeddin Mosque
- House: House of Seljuq
- Father: Kilij Arslan I
- Religion: Sunni Islam

Malik Shah (Old Anatolian Turkish: مَلِكشاه,Turkish: Melikşah, Persian: ملک شاه), also known as Şâhinşah (Persian: شاهنشاه, lit. 'king of kings'), was the Seljuk Sultan of Rum from 1110 to 1116.

== Reign ==
In 1107, Malik Shah came with his father, Kilij Arsalan I, during his campaign on Mosul. After Kilij Arslan I entered the city, Malik Shah was appointed as its Emir, and Emir Idbar was appointed as his regent, and after leaving some forces to protect Mosul, Kilij Arslan left to face Jawali Saqawa, the Emir of Mosul appointed by Muhammed I Tapar. But Kilij Arslan was defeated and died in Battle of Khabur River. Jawali captured Mosul, restoring it under Muhammed I's domains, and sent him Malik Shah to Isfahan where he was prisoned for three years, while the throne in Rum remained vacant.

Malik Shah remained a prisoner in Isfahan until 1110 when he returned to Anatolia to assume the throne. He then imprisoned his two younger brothers, Mesud and Arab. However, his position remained insecure, as he was attacked by the Danishmendid beylik.

Shortly before his death, he was defeated by the Byzantine emperor Alexios Komnenos at the Battle of Philomelion (1116). Malik Shah then signed a treaty with the emperor, allegedly agreeing to let the Byzantines take back all their land in Anatolia. Using the peace treaty as a pretext, the Danishmendid ruler Gümüshtigin deposed Malik Shah and replaced him with Mesud, who was married to his daughter. The treaty was thus nullified. Malik Shah was then executed by being strangled with a bowstring. The loss of prestige suffered by Malik Shah due to his defeat by the Byzantines probably precipitated his fall.

Malik Shah was described by Anna Komnena as a fool who often ignored the strategies of his more experienced generals, to the point where he mocked and criticized his generals.

== Bibliography ==
- Birkenmeier, John W. (2002). The Development of the Komnenian Army: 1081–1180. Brill. ISBN 90-04-11710-5.
- Komnene (Comnena), Anna; Sewter, Edgar Robert Ashton (1969). The Alexiad of Anna Comnena translated by Edgar Robert Ashton Sewter. Penguin Classics. ISBN 0-14-044215-4.

Regnal titles
Preceded by Kilij Arslan I	Sultan of Rum; 1110-1116	Succeeded by Mesud I
Preceded by Zengi ibn Jikirmish	Emir of Mosul; 1107	Succeeded by Jawali Saqawa as Emir of Mosul; None, as Seljuks of Rum governor on Mosul
