= Gündoğan, Oğuzeli =

Village in Gaziantep Province, Turkey

Gündoğan
- Neighbourhood
- Location in Turkey
- Coordinates: 36°52′44″N 37°32′44″E
- Country: Turkey
- Province: Gaziantep
- District: Oğuzeli
- Population (2022): 374
- Time zone: UTC+3 (TRT)

Gündoğan, historically Turbessel (Syriac: Tel Bshir; Arabic: Tell Bāshir or Tel-Basheir; Armenian: Թլպաշար, romanized: Tʿlpašar; Turkish: Tilbeşar or Tilbaşar), is a neighbourhood in the municipality and district of Oğuzeli, Gaziantep Province, Turkey. Its population is 374 (2022). It was originally a fortress that played an important role in the Crusades, remnant of which is a tumulus.

== History ==
=== Bronze Age ===
The site was occupied at the beginning of the 3rd millennium BC through the end of the 17th century BC, after which it was abandoned. It was located 50 km west of Carchemish.

According to archaeologist Alfonso Archi (2011), Gündoğan can be identified with the ancient city of Hassum (Hassuwan), the city that was mentioned in the Ebla tablets of about 2300 BC.

==== Early Bronze ====
By 2600 BC (EBIIIA) the site was about 56 hectares. It had burials showing the emergence of an elite class.

By 2450 BC (EBIIIB) it was a planned city.

==== First Intermediate Period ====
In the EBIV, the city saw heavy destruction, but it was never abandoned.

==== Middle Bronze ====
In the MBI, the city was rebuilt in a smaller scale.

In the MBII, the city saw major construction work.

=== Byzantine Period ===
While the site had been occupied since the Bronze Age, the fort gained importance during the Byzantine Empire and came under control of local Armenian lords in the late 11th century.

=== Crusader era ===
Turbessel as part of the County of Edessa

In 1097, during the First Crusade, Baldwin I took the fortresses of Ravendel and Turbessel, which he left as fiefs to the Armenian companions who had guided him. He then was called to Edessa by the Armenian Thoros who was threatened by the Seljuks. Baldwin responded to that call and had himself adopted as successor to Thoros, in which he became Count of Edessa in 1098.

In 1100, when Godfrey of Bouillon died, Baldwin entrusted the county of Edessa to his cousin Baldwin II, then Joscelin I joined him there in 1101, and was entrusted with the county of Edessa. In late September 1108, near Turbessel, Tancred, with 1,500 Frankish knights and infantry, and 600 Turkish horsemen sent by Fakhr al-Mulk Ridwan confronted Baldwin II and the 2,000 men of Jawali Saqawa, atabeg of Mosul. A battle erupted and Tancred and Ridwan routed Jawali's men who took refuge in Turbessel. Later on, Tancred who had initially refused to abandon Turbessel to Baldwin II, decided at the assembly in Château Pèlerin in April 1109, to give up Turbessel in return for his restoration to his old domains in the Kingdom of Jerusalem.

From 1110, Mawdud, atabeg of Mosul, resumed the offensive against the Franks and attacked the county of Edessa. Mawdûd successively besieged Edessa then Turbessel, but had to lift the siege each time, as Joscelin I succeeded in attacking the rearguard of the Turkish army. In July 1111, Mawdud launched a new invasion against the county and laid siege to Turbessel. While Mawdud was besieging Turbessel, Sultan, the Munquidite emir (or ruler) of Shaizar, sent envoys to him, seeking his assistance against Tancred. Mawdud lifted the siege of Turbessel and moved to help Shaizar.

Mawdud's invasions devastated the eastern regions of the county, but Joscelin's fief at Turbessel still flourished. In 1113, Baldwin persuaded Joscelin to come to Edessa, saying that he was dying and wanted to make his last will. Stating that Joscelin had not sent enough food to Edessa, Baldwin had him imprisoned and only released him after Joscelin renounced Turbessel. In 1120 an army of 133,000 men (likely exaggerated) under Ilghazi burned and pillaged Tell Bashir and its surrounding areas, enslaving much of the population.

Following the fall of Edessa in 1144, Joscelin II fled to Turbessel, where he held the remnants of the county west of the Euphrates. In 1150, Nur ad-Din defeated Joscelin II, after allying with the Seljuk Sultan of Rüm, Mas'ud. Then he tried to besiege Turbessel, but the arrival of Baldwin III forced him to lift the siege. Count Joscelin II was captured shortly after, on May 4, 1150 on his way to Antioch, and Turbessel was again besieged, but fiercely defended by Countess Beatrice of Saone. Eventually, finding her limits in defending the citadel and with the king's consent, she ceded what remains of the county to the Byzantines, but the latter proved unable to defend the city and Hanas, a lieutenant of Nur ad-Din, occupied it on July 12, 1151.

== Demographics ==
The area was populated by Christian Armenians during the Crusades. On the eve of the First World War, there were 100 Armenian families in Tilbaşar. They were deported and massacred during the Armenian genocide.

The village is inhabited by Turkicized Arabs from the Damalha and Albusultan tribes and Abdals of the Maya Sekenler tribe.

== Sources ==
- Barber, Malcolm (2012). The Crusader States. Yale University Press. ISBN 978-0-300-11312-9.
- Fink, Harold S. (1969). "The Foundation of the Latin States, 1099–1118". In Setton, Kenneth M.; Baldwin, Marshall W. (eds.). A History of the Crusades, Volume One: The First Hundred Years. The University of Wisconsin Press. pp. 368–409. ISBN 978-1-58684-251-2.
- Kepinski, Christine (2010), Tilbeshar, A Major City of the Early and Middle Bronze Ages, west of the big bend of the Euphrates (south-eastern Turkey): Results from 2005 and 2006 seasons in 6 ICAANE by Licia Romano ed., Otto Harrassowitz Verlag, p. 303, ISBN 9783447062169
- le Strange, Guy (1890), Palestine Under the Moslems: A Description of Syria and the Holy Land from A.D. 650 to 1500, Committee of the Palestine Exploration Fund, p. 542
- Lock, Peter (2006). The Routledge Companion to the Crusades. Routledge. ISBN 9-78-0-415-39312-6.
- Nicholson, Robert Lawrence (1973). Joscelyn III and the Fall of the Crusader States, 1134-1199. BRILL. ISBN 90-04-03676-8.
- Runciman, Steven (1989). A History of the Crusades, Volume II: The Kingdom of Jerusalem and the Frankish East, 1100-1187. Cambridge University Press. ISBN 978-0-521-06162-9.
