= Shihna =

Noble title

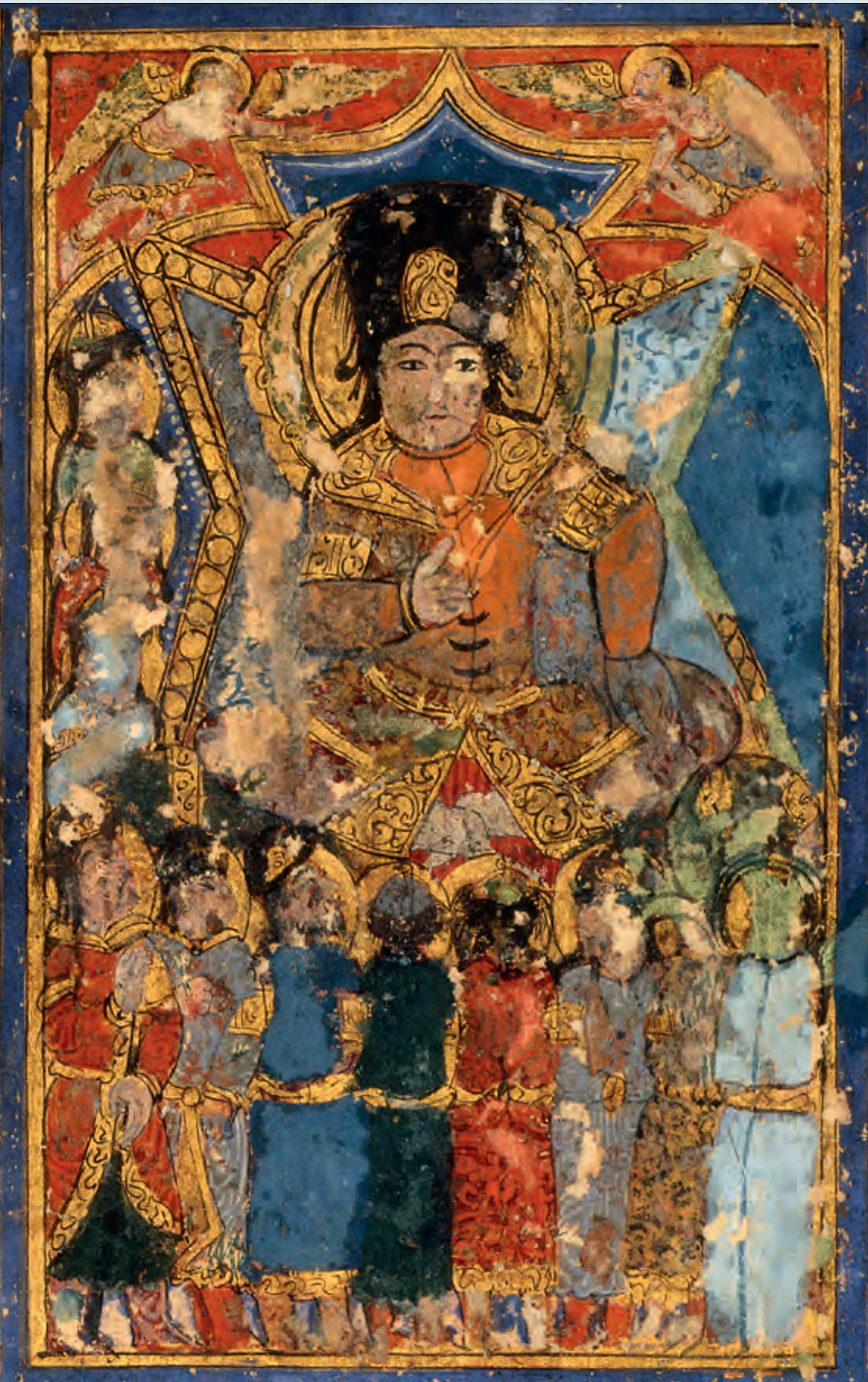
Ruler in Turkic military dress: long braids, sharbush fur hat, boots, close-fitting coat. Maqamat by Al-Hariri of Basra (1054–1122), a high government official of the Seljuks. Mesopotamia, 1237 copy.

Shiḥna (Arabic: شحنة) was a medieval Islamic term meaning, roughly, "military administrator." The term was used particularly for the Seljuk Turks' representative in Iraq, who exerted the Seljuks' power over the Abbasid caliph. The Seljuks themselves ruled their empire, which included most of southwest Asia in the 11th century and after, from Iran in Isfahan.

== List of shihnas ==
=== Baghdad ===
- Bursuq the Elder (April 1060 – 1061), the first shihna of Baghdad
- Oshin (1061–?), a ghulam
- Aqsunqur al-Bursuqi
- Ilghazi (until 1104)
- Aqsunqur al-Bursuqi (1124-1125)
- Baran-Qush Zakawi (1125-1126)
- Zengi (1126-1127)

== Sources ==
- "Shihna." Encyclopedia of Islam 3rd ed. Leiden: E. J. Brill, 1993.
