= Sökmen (Artuqid) =

Early 12th century Turkish Bey

Governor of Jerusalem
- In office 1091–1098
- Preceded by: Artuk Bey

Bey of Artukids
- In office 1102–1104
- Succeeded by: İbrahim of Artukids

Personal details
- Born: unknown
- Died: 1104

Military service
- Allegiance: Seljuq Empire
- Battles/wars: Battle of Harran

Sökmen (also called Moinuddin Sokman, Muʿīn ad-Dīn Soqman or Soqman ibn Artuq) was a Turkish emir of the Seljuk Empire in the early 12th century.

== Biography ==
=== Origin ===
His father was Artuk, a commander in the Seljuk Empire. He supported Tutush I, a member of the Seljukid house whose province was Greater Syria. As such, Artuk and his son Sökmen aided Tutush in the battle of Ain Salm against the rebellious Suleiman ibn Qutalmish. They were then rewarded with the governorship of Jerusalem. After Artuk's death in 1091, Sökmen and his brother Ilghazi became the co-governors of the city. In 1093, a revolt broke out and an unknown group captured the Tower of David. Pitched battles were fought in the street by the Turkomans as the brothers struggled to get the situation under control.

=== In Anatolia and Syria ===
Sökmen spent much of his time in Anatolia and Syria. After Tutush's death in 1095, Sökmen took service with Ridwan of Aleppo, Tutush's son. Sökmen made use of the fight between Ridwan and his brother Duqaq to a gain a territory of his own around Suruç (now a district center in Şanlıurfa Province of Turkey). Soon after, Sökmen and his brother lost their position in Jerusalem when it was taken by the Fatimids in 1098. Sökmen abandoned the city and moved to north.

In 1098, the Seljuk Empire formed an army under the command of Kerbogha of Mosul to assist Yağısıyan during the siege of Antioch. Sökmen took part in this army. But the campaign was a failure and the army arrived a few days after Antioch surrendered. In 1101, Baldwin I of Jerusalem captured Suruç.

=== Sökmen’s beylik ===
Kerbogha died in 1102 and during the ensuing struggle to control Musul, Sökmen supported Musa, the viceroy of Musul. For his services, Musa granted the city Hasankeyf to Sökmen. Sökmen founded a small beylik around Hasankeyf. This beylik is now considered one of the three Arkukid beyliks. (The other two were İlghazi's Mardin beylik and Harput beylik.) The Hasankeyf beylik survived through 1231.

After being a bey, he supported his brother Ilghazi who had recently been dismissed from his post as a Seljukid shihna in Baghdad. In 1104, in the battle of Harran he defeated a Crusader army. In this battle he took Baldwin II of Jerusalem and Joscelin I captive.

=== Death ===
Toghtekin, the ruler of Damascus asked Sökmen to support him against the Crusaders. Sökmen agreed; but on the way to Damascus, at al-Qaryatayn, he died of a pertussis in October 1104.

== Sources ==
- Beihammer, Alexander Daniel (2017). Byzantium and the Emergence of Muslim Turkish Anatolia, ca. 1040-1130. Routledge. ISBN 978-1-138-22959-4.
- Montefiore, Simon Sebag (27 January 2011). Jerusalem: The Biography – A History of the Middle East. Orion. ISBN 978-0-297-85864-5.
- Nicolle, David (2003). Birinci Haçlı seferi 1996-1999. İstanbul: Türkiye İş Bankası Yayınları. ISBN 978-605-360-245-3.
- Yücel, Yaşar; Sevim, Ali (1990). Türkiye Tarihi Cilt I. Ankara: AKDTYK Yayınları.
- Güray Kırpık (n.d.). "Artuklu Haçlı Münasebetleri (1098-1124)" (PDF). Gazi University.
