= Fakhr al-Mulk Ridwan =

Seljuk ruler of Aleppo (1095–1113)

Ridwan

Emir of Aleppo
- Reign: 1095–1113
- Predecessor: Tutush I
- Successor: Alp Arslan al-Akhras
- Born: c. 1077
- Died: 10 December 1113; Aleppo, Seljuk Empire
- Burial: Meşhedülmelik
- Consort: Jijak Khatun
- Issue: Alp Arslan al-Akhras; Malik Shah; Mubarak Shah; Sultan Shah; Farkhunda Khatun; Amina Khatun
Names
- Fakhr al-Mulk Ridwan ibn Tutush
- House: Seljuk
- Father: Tutush I
- Mother: Safwat al-Mulk
- Religion: Sunni Islam

Ridwan (Note: His full name was Fakhr al-Mulk Ridwan ibn Tutush (Arabic: فخر الملك رضوان ابن تتش), though he is commonly referred to as Ridwan (Arabic: رضوان), which is also romanised as Radwan or Rudwan.) (c. 1077 – 10 December 1113) was a Seljuk emir of Aleppo from 1095 until his death.

Ridwan was born to the Seljuk prince Tutush, who had established a principality in Syria after his brother, Sultan Malik-Shah I granted him the region and its adjacent areas as an appanage. After the death of Malik-Shah, Tutush claimed the Seljuk crown, but he was killed by the forces of his nephew Berkyaruq near Ray, Iran. Following this, Ridwan moved to Aleppo and proclaimed himself the new emir. His brother Duqaq's declaration of a new emirate in Damascus split the Syrian Seljuk state in two and started a rivalry between the brothers which continued even after the arrival of the First Crusade in 1097. Ridwan tried to banish the Crusaders with gold, and fought the Principality of Antioch, a Crusader state established after the end of the Siege of Antioch in 1098. Bohemond I of Antioch invaded Ridwan's domain and reached Aleppo's surroundings. Bohemond's successor, Tancred, regent of Antioch, also warred against Ridwan, but the two later allied in a conflict against the emir of Mosul, Jawali Saqawa, supported by Baldwin II of Edessa and Joscelin I, the Lord of Turbessel.

Ridwan's personality was shrouded in mystery. He was surrounded by the Shia Arabs of Aleppo and favoured the Nizari Isma'ilis. Ridwan became a patron of the Assassins, giving them the freedom to practice and propagate their religion by letting them establish a Mission House (dar al-dawah) in Aleppo and use the city as a base for future activities, which allowed the Assassins to establish a foothold in Syria. Ridwan had two of his brothers strangled to death, and had alleged ties to the assassination of several of his rivals, including the atabeg Janah ad-Dawla al-Husain. Ridwan's death in 1113 caused an anti-Isma'ili reaction within Aleppo. The administrative sovereignty of the atabeg Lu'lu' al-Yaya, and the effective elimination of the Assassins in Aleppo, characterized the reign of his successor, Alp Arslan al-Akhras. Seljuk rule in Aleppo soon ended in 1118 with the Artuqid takeover by Ilghazi.

== Background ==
Fakhr al-Mulk Ridwan was born around 1077. He was the eldest of five sons of Taj ad-Dawla Tutush, the brother of the Seljuk Sultan Malik-Shah I, and the mayor of Ganja in Arran. In 1078, Malik-Shah sent Tutush to conquer Syria and the adjacent areas as an appanage, creating a principality there. Tutush besieged and conquered Aleppo the next year, while a Fatimid army simultaneously besieged Damascus. Thereupon, the Turcoman ruler of Damascus, Atsiz ibn Uwaq (r. 1071–1079) asked for help from Tutush. Having heard that Tutush was coming, the Fatimid forces retreated. Even though Atsiz accepted Tutush's suzerainty, Tutush had Atsiz strangled with the bowstring of his bow on the pretext that he was late to greet him and that he was conspiring against him with his brother. Tutush conquered Southern Syria and Palestine, capturing Jerusalem, Damascus, Acre, Tyre, Tripoli, Jaffa, and Arish, as well as the region of Galilee, previously held by Atsiz, and founded the Syrian Seljuk State.

Map of the Seljuk Empire at the death of Malik-Shah I in 1092.

Tutush struggled with the Seljuk Sultan of Rum, Suleiman ibn Qutalmish (r. 1077–1086), who had claimed Aleppo. Qutalmish was defeated and killed in a battle that took place near Aleppo on 4 June 1086. Sultan Malik-Shah died in November 1092, though there were no princes of age to inherit the vast Seljuk empire. Tutush claimed the Seljuk throne, as he was the only adult, though he gained little support from the Turkic elite. He then captured Mosul, Aleppo and the Diyar Bakr. One of Malik-Shah's wives, Terken Khatun, who was trying to install her four-year-old son Mahmud to the throne, then tried to reach out to Tutush but died suddenly in 1094. By 1094, Tutush, accompanied by his son, Shams al-Muluk Duqaq, had invaded the Jazira and western Iran, seizing the city of Ray. However, his nephew Berkyaruq's forces killed him near the same city on 25 February 1095.

== Reign ==
=== Ridwan's rivalry with Duqaq ===
Shown in brown and red is the extent of both of Ridwan and Duqaq's territories respectively within the broader political context of the Levant, c.1097 AD

Ridwan learned of his father's death while he was camping in Anah and returned immediately to Aleppo and took over the Syrian Seljuk throne. The Turcoman ruler of Antioch, Yaghi-Siyan, gave his daughter to Ridwan in marriage and recognised Ridwan as his overlord, with coins being struck in his name in the city. Ridwan, fearing that they might gain power and overthrow him, strangled his two brothers, Abu Talib and Behram, while his other brother, Duqaq, accompanied by the atabeg Janah ad-Dawla al-Husain, sneaked out of Aleppo and moved to Damascus, founding a separate state there. Ridwan did not recognise Duqaq's domain and proclaimed himself the sole legitimate ruler of the Syrian Seljuks. Thereupon, Ridwan besieged Damascus but failed to seize it and had to return to Aleppo. Thus, the Syrian Seljuk state was divided into two rival halves, ruled from Aleppo and Damascus.

In 1096, Ridwan wished to expand his domain and besieged Suruç, which was ruled at the time by his cousin, Soqman ibn Ortoq. He failed to seize the town. Later, he marched on Edessa and conquered the city. He also planned to capture Harran, but gave up because of unrest among his commanders. Ridwan then captured Turbessel after eliminating Yusuf ibn Abaq, one of the commanders who had disobeyed him. He moved to besiege Damascus again when Duqaq was out of the city, but then lifted the siege when he was informed of Duqaq's approaching army and returned to Aleppo. Ridwan besieged Damascus again in the same year, but was again thwarted. Duqaq then launched raids against the territory of Aleppo, but Ridwan defeated him on 22 March 1097 at Qinnasrin. Taking advantage of the Syrian Seljuk split, the Fatimid vizier, al-Afdal Shahanshah, promised military support to Ridwan against his brother if he pledged allegiance to the Fatimid caliph al-Musta'li by having the Friday sermon read in his name. Ridwan agreed to this on 28 August 1097 but was met with harsh reactions among the Sunni leaders. A month later, Ridwan reverted to having the sermon read on behalf of the Sunni Abbasid caliph and the Seljuk sultan, also apologizing to the Abbasid caliph al-Mustazhir.

=== Crusades and Isma'ilism ===
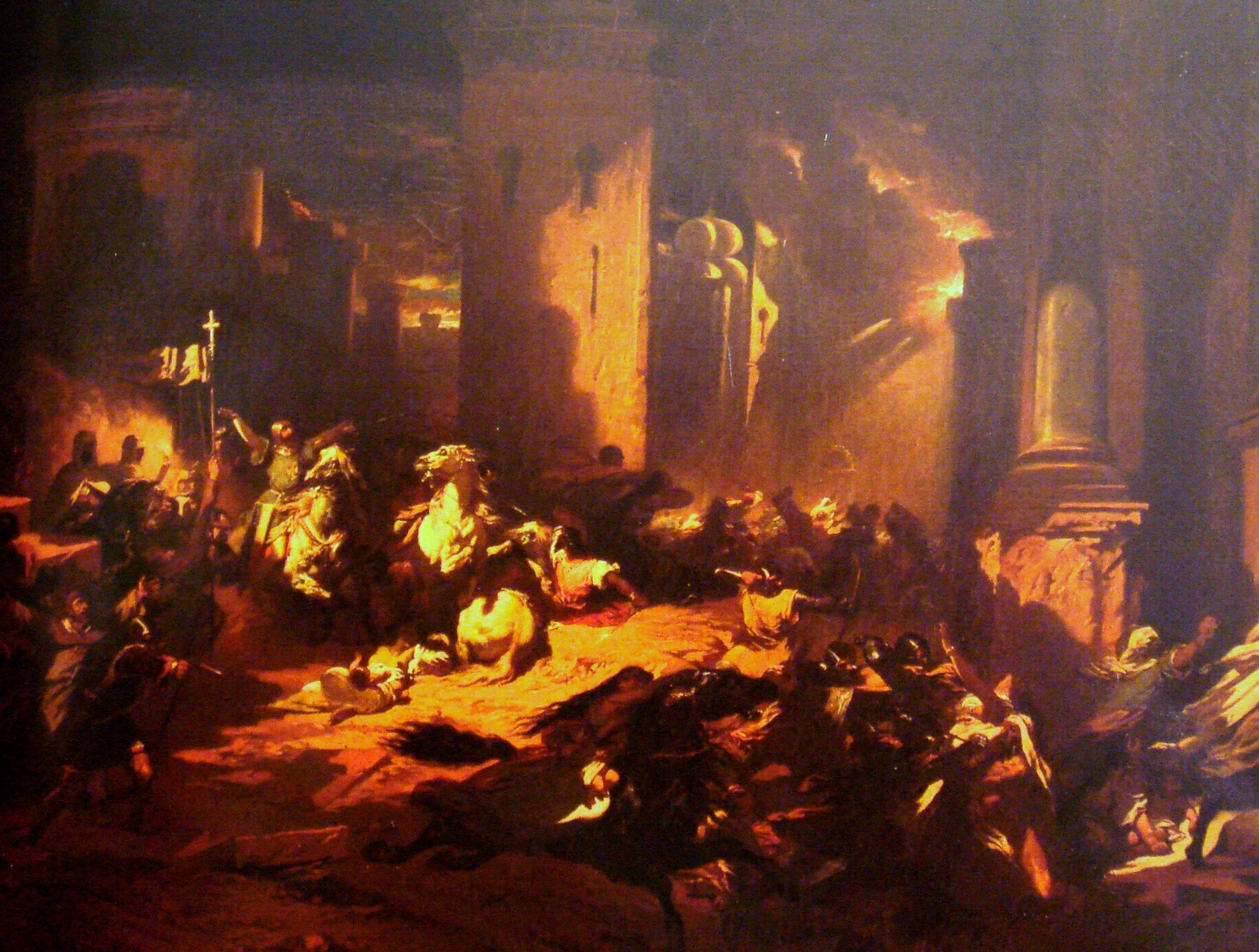
An 1840 painting by Louis Gallait, depicting the Siege of Antioch by Bohemond I.

Ridwan prepared to attack Duqaq and Janah ad-Dawla, who had established an independent emirate in Homs. Meanwhile, the Crusaders marched on Antioch, and the city's governor, Yaghi-Siyan, who was disloyal to Ridwan and had openly intrigued with his rivals—his brother Duqaq and Kerbogha, the Turcoman Atabeg of Mosul—asked for help from the Muslim leaders, including the Seljuk Sultan Berkyaruq. Ridwan was not keen to help and sent only a small unit to the aid of the Muslim coalition led by Kerbogha, the Turcoman emir of Mosul. Ridwan did not participate in their expeditions, though his brother Duqaq and the atabeg Janah ad-Dawla did. Yaghi-Siyan left Ridwan's side because of his behaviour, but then was forced to return to him after Duqaq failed him. Duqaq later feared that moving troops into Aleppo's environs would allow Ridwan to strike at his domain. Ridwan, accompanied by Soqman ibn Ortoq, led an army to relieve Antioch. They retook Harem, but as they approached Antioch, the crusaders under the command of Bohemond of Taranto sent out all of their cavalry to lure the larger Turcoman forces to his desired battlefield—a narrow strip of land wedged between the Orontes River and Lake Antioch. Ridwan was defeated in the Battle of the Lake of Antioch, and his forces retreated, while the Crusaders reoccupied Harem. The Crusaders captured Antioch in June 1098 and established a principality there with Bohemond as its ruler. They then seized al-Bara and Ma'arrat al-Nu'man, and captured Zardana, Sarmeen and Kella, surrounding Aleppo. Bohemond defeated Ridwan again on 5 July 1100. While Bohemond was closing on Aleppo, the Armenian ruler of Melitene, Gabriel, asked for his help against the Danishmendid ruler Gazi Gümüshtigin. Ridwan used this opportunity to seize supplies stored by the Crusaders.

Meanwhile, Ridwan made peace with Janah ad-Dawla in Nukrah. Despite this, on 1 May 1103, Janah ad-Dawla was stabbed to death in Homs by three Persian Assassins dressed as Sufis, acting on a signal from a sheikh who accompanied them. Janah ad-Dawla's officers and the assassins were killed during the ensuing chaos, and most of Homs' Turkish population fled to Damascus, while the city itself was annexed into Duqaq's domain. Most sources suggest Ridwan initiated the assassination of Janah ad-Dawla. Ridwan, residing in the Citadel of Aleppo, had favoured the Shi'a, who comprised an important part of Aleppo's population, hoping to win their support. Prior to this incident, Ridwan gave freedom to the Assassins to practice and propagate their religion, letting them establish a "house of propaganda" in Aleppo and using the city as a base for future activities. The Assassins thus gained a foothold in Syria. Despite this, Ridwan's adherence to the Assassins' Nizari Isma'ili creed is uncertain, and according to historian Bernard Lewis, was unlikely.

=== Conflicts and alliance with Tancred ===
In general, Ridwan tried to banish the Crusaders with gold, despite being characterised as a "rapacious miser" among the Shia and Sunni Muslims in his domain. The regent of Antioch, Tancred, who forcibly collected money from the rural locals, made peace with Ridwan, in return receiving 7000 gold dinars and 10,000 cattle and sheep. Ridwan profited from Soqman ibn Ortoq's victory over the Crusaders in the Battle of Harran in 1104 and took back the cities and fortresses occupied by the Crusaders. Ridwan's brother and rival, Duqaq, died of tuberculosis on 6 June 1104, after which Ridwan moved to Damascus and gave khutbah in his own name, though Duqaq was succeeded by his son, Tutush II. Soon after, Tutush II and his relatives were set aside by his atabeg, Toghtekin, and the Turkish Burid dynasty succeeded the Seljuks in Damascus.

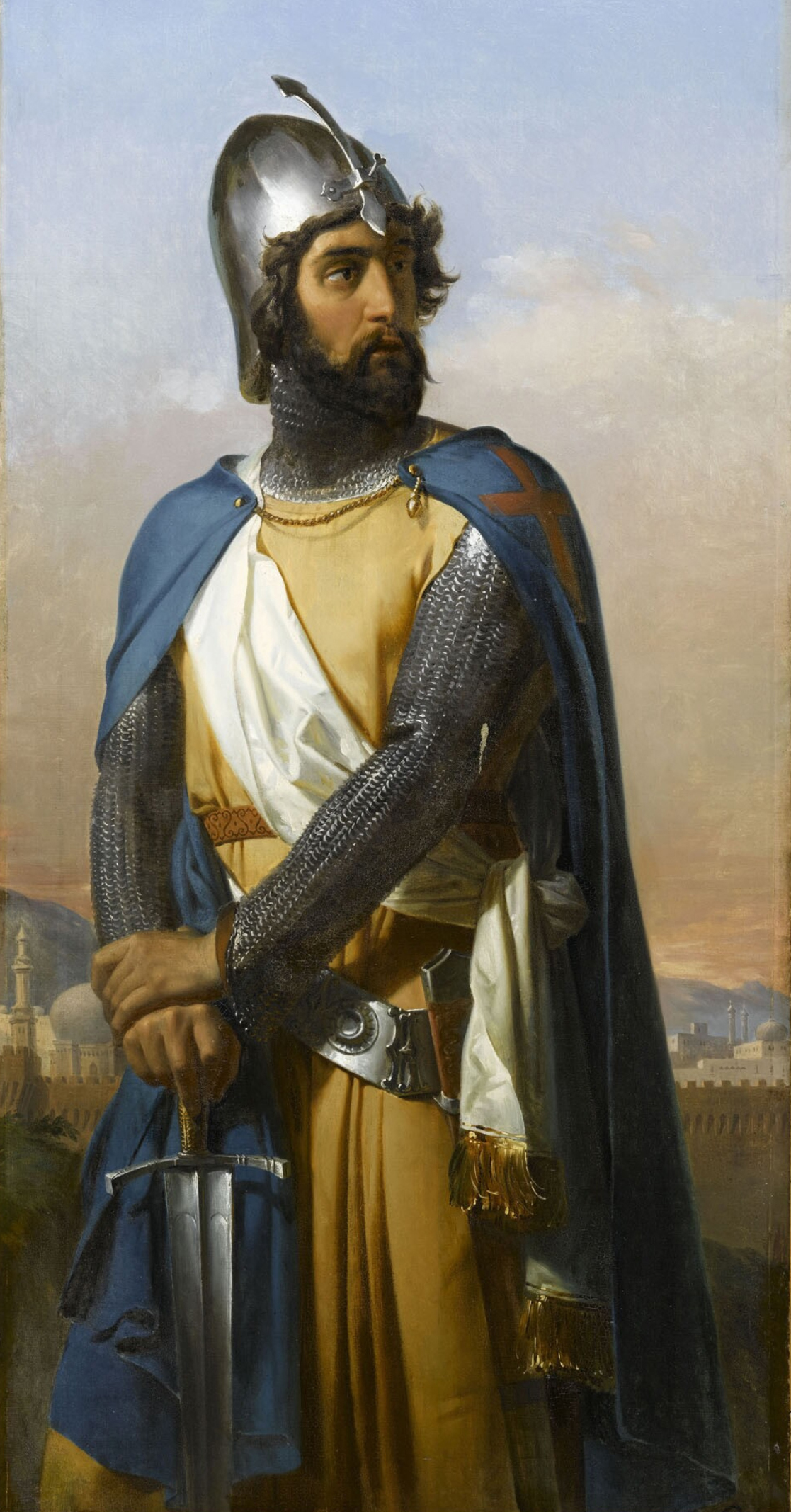
A 1840 painting by Merry-Joseph Blondel, depicting Tancred.

In 1105, Ridwan left Aleppo to aid the qadi of Tripoli, Fakhr al-Mulk ibn Ammar, against the Crusaders, but when he learned Tancred had besieged Artah, he turned back to relieve the town. Tancred offered peace to Ridwan. He refused it and was defeated on 20 April 1105 in the Battle of Artah, after which Tancred invaded and plundered the surroundings of Aleppo. Later, the pro-Fatimid emir of Apamea, Khalaf ibn Mula'ib, was assassinated and Ridwan added the town to his domain, though he lost it to Tancred in 1106. These events prompted Ridwan to ally with Ilghazi against, Jikirmish, the emir of Mosul, in besieging Nussaybin. Moreover, the new emir of Mosul, Chavli Saqaveh, joined this alliance against Kilij Arslan I, the Seljuk Sultan of Rûm, who had occupied Mosul. Ridwan and Chavli defeated and killed Kilij Arslan in 1107. While Chavli's behaviour had disturbed Ridwan, the Seljuk Sultan and Ridwan's uncle Muhammad I Tapar, dismissed Chavli. Not accepting this decision, he allied with local emirs and marched towards Syria. Ridwan first seized the ransom sent to Chavli by Baldwin II of Edessa in Siffin, and cooperated with the Numayrids against him, while Chavli occupied Balis. Thereupon, Ridwan allied with Tancred against Chavli, who also sought help from Baldwin and Joscelin I, the Lord of Turbessel. Ridwan's 600-strong cavalry and Tancred's army of 1,500 knights and foot-soldiers engaged Chavli, Baldwin, and Joscelin's force of two thousand men in Turbessel in September 1108, defeating them in a battle in which both sides suffered heavy casualties. As a result, Balis returned to Seljuk control.

While Tancred was in Edessa, Ridwan launched raids against Antioch to reclaim the lands surrounding Aleppo but retreated after learning of Tancred's arrival. Ridwan's situation worsened when Tancred attacked east of Aleppo in retaliation. Ridwan gave Tancred 20,000 dinars, and 10,000 horses, as well as two fortresses in the vicinity of Aleppo, and freed the captives he had taken during his raids, in exchange for peace. This agreement caused a famine around Aleppo, and Ridwan had to sell the lands from his own demesne to the locals at low prices. Furthermore, Ibn al-Khashshab, the Shi'a qadi and rais of Aleppo, organised a riot in the city when Tancred forced Ridwan to affix a cross in the Great Mosque of Aleppo. Tancred, who controlled the routes from Aleppo to the Mediterranean, had held Aleppan caravans to ransom, and was plundering Syria, especially Aleppo's environs. Ridwan did not have enough resources to deal with Tancred by himself, so Ibn al-Khashshab proposed to send a delegation of Shia and Sunni notables, merchants and clerics to the Seljuk sultan Muhammad I in Baghdad. Ridwan agreed to do so. Muhammad I started expeditions against the Crusaders with the Emir of Mosul, Mawdud ibn Altuntash, first besieging Harran, and then Turbessel. Ridwan tried to profit from this by engaging in it as little as possible, though he then abandoned the Muslim coalition by buying a pardon from the Crusaders, angering his subjects and the Muslim rulers alike. Meanwhile, Ridwan asked Mawdud to lift his siege of Turbessel and come to his aid in Aleppo. However, Ridwan did not allow the Seljuk army inside the city and imprisoned Ibn al-Khashshab and his major supporters. Yet again, Ridwan did not join the Muslim expeditions, and the Seljuk army left Syria in August 1111 without fighting a single battle.

=== Last years ===
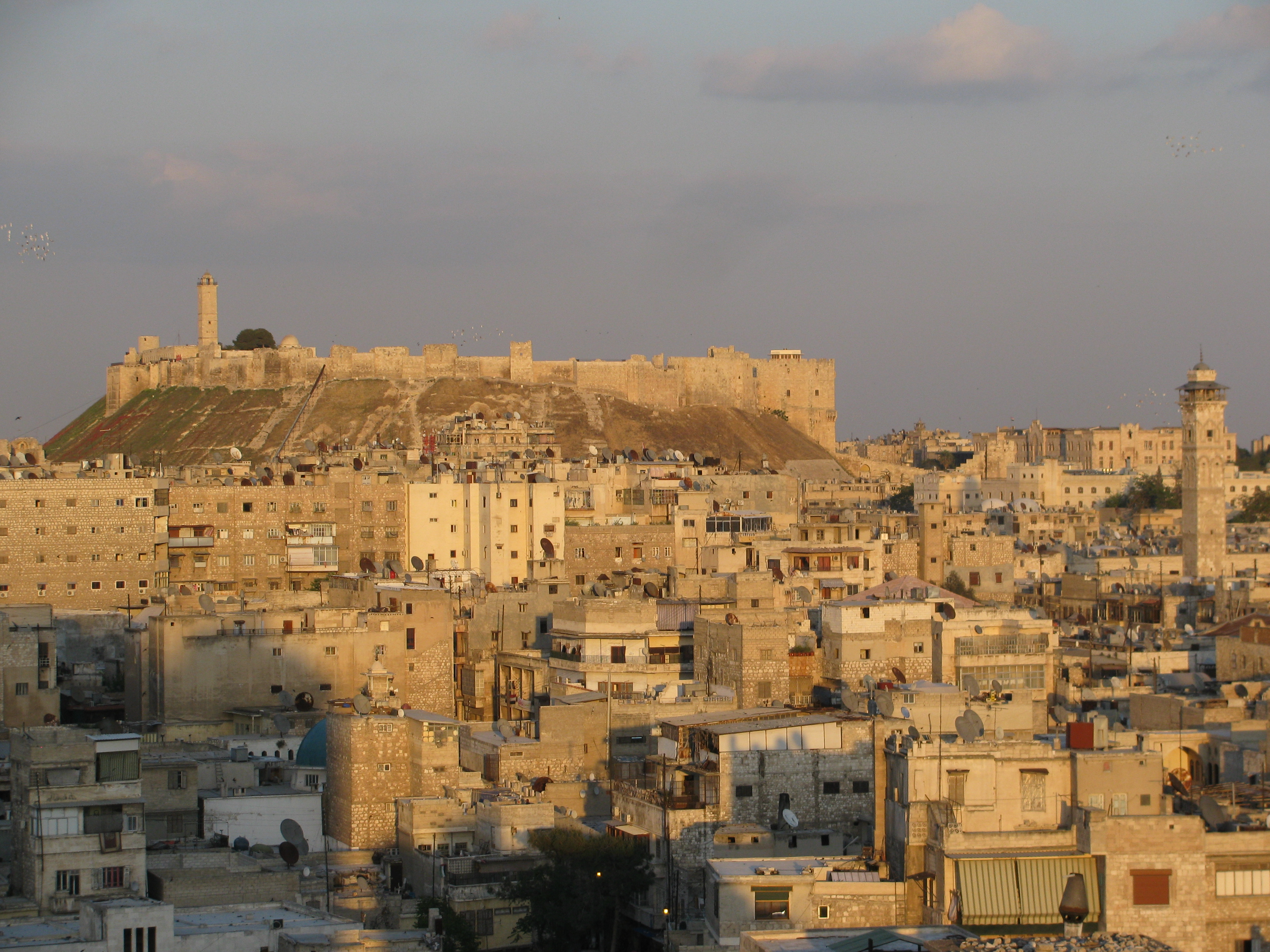
Aleppo, and its citadel, where Ridwan resided, in 2008.

Ridwan's financial situation worsened. His attempt to confiscate the goods of a merchant named Abu Harb Isa from Khorasan, in cooperation with the Isma'ilis, greatly damaged his reputation. When the atabeg Toghtekin came to lead the Muslim armies against Sidon or Tripoli, he passed by Damascus, where Ridwan tried to assassinate him, but dropped this plan when he learned Tancred was preparing to invade Azaz, and asked Toghtegin for help. In 1112, they signed a defensive treaty at Aleppo, in return of for recognition of Ridwan's formal sovereignty over Damascus. When Baldwin I of Jerusalem invaded Damascus, Toghtegin asked Ridwan for help, but the latter sent only a small force of 100 horsemen. Toghtegin was angered by this and ended the Friday sermon given in Ridwan's name in Damascus on 16 August 1113. On 2 October 1113, Mawdud, one of the commanders of the Muslim expedition, was assassinated after his prayers in the Umayyad Mosque of Damascus.Toghtegin accused Ridwan and his Assassin allies of the deed, though most of his contemporaries believed that Toghtegin himself was behind the act.

=== Death and succession ===
Ridwan died on 10 December 1113 in Aleppo and was buried in Meşhedülmelik. Following Ridwan's death, groups of armed militiamen, instigated by Ibn al-Khashab, flooded the streets of Aleppo, occupied the major buildings and captured many of Ridwan's supporters, notably the members of the Order of Assassins, who were immediately put to death, accused of treachery and collaboration with the Crusaders. Meanwhile, the realm passed to his 16 year-old son, Alp Arslan, who stuttered so severely that he was nicknamed al-Akhras (The Mute). His reign, and the following reign of 6 year-old Sultan Shah ibn Radwan, is generally accepted as being under the de facto rule of the atabeg Lu'lu' al-Yaya. Alp Arslan initially followed his father's pro-Isma'ili policy, giving them a castle outside of Balis. Despite this, the Seljuk sultan Muhammad I, sent a letter to Alp Arslan, warning him of the dangers of the Assassins and urging him to purge them. Forced by Aleppo's population and his patron, Alp Arslan took a series of vigorous measures against the Isma'ilis, putting Abu Tahir al-Sa'igh, the chief Nizari Isma'ili da'i of Syria, and other leading figures to death, and killing or imprisoning about two hundred of the order's members. The massacres of the Isma'ilis effectively eradicated a significant portion of Aleppo's Isma'ili population and eliminated the so-called Assassin threat, though it also deprived Alp Arslan from his only possible support. He also executed two of his brothers, several officers, a few servants, and anyone to whom he took a dislike, which caused discomfort among Aleppans. Alp Arslan then sought Toghtekin's protection, but this caused distrust among Aleppo's Shi'a population. Alp Arslan was killed in 1114 on his own atabeg's initiative, and anarchy ensued, while Ridwan's slaves and Aleppo's nobility each tried to impose their authority among the townsmen. The rule of the Seljuk dynasty in Aleppo soon ended in 1118.

== Notes ==
Regnal titles
Preceded by Tutush I	Amir of Aleppo; 1095–1113	Succeeded by Alp Arslān al-Akhras
