= Kilij Arslan I =

Sultan of Rum from 1092 to 1107

- Statue of Kilij Arslan I in Alanya

Sultan of Rum
- Reign: 1092–1107
- Predecessor: Suleyman I
- Successor: Malik Shah
- Born: 1079
- Died: 13 July 1107 (aged 27–28); Khabur River
- Cause of death: Drowning
- Burial: Silvan, Diyarbakır, Turkey
- Consort: Ayse Hatun (daughter of Çaka Bey)
- Issue: Malik Shah; Mesud I Melik Arap Shah; Melik Toğrul Arslan; Saide Hatun
Names
- Dawud ibn Sulayman ibn Qutalmish
- House: House of Seljuq
- Father: Suleyman I of Rûm
- Religion: Sunni Islam
- Military career
- Conflicts: People's Crusade; Battles of Heraclea; Battle of Mersivan; Crusade of 1101; Battle of Dorylaeum (1097); Siege of Nicaea; Battle of Civetot; Siege of Xerigordos; War of Mosul (1106-1107); Battle of Khabur River (1107) †

Kilij Arslan I ibn Suleiman (Old Anatolian Turkish: قِلِیچ اَرسلان; Persian: قلیچ ارسلان, romanized: Qilij Arslān; Turkish: I. Kılıç Arslan or Kılıcarslan, lit. "Sword Lion") (1079–1107) was the Seljuk sultan of Rûm. He reigned from 1092 until his death in 1107. He ruled the Sultanate during the time of the First Crusade and thus faced the earliest attacks from Christian forces. He also re-established the Sultanate of Rum after the death of Malik Shah I of the Seljuk Empire and defeated the Crusaders in three battles during the Crusade of 1101. Kilij Arslan was the first Muslim and Turkish commander to fight against the Crusaders, commanding his horse archers as a teenager.

== Rise to power ==
After the death of his father, Suleiman ibn Qutalmish, in 1086, he became a hostage of Sultan Malik Shah I of Great Seljuq in Isfahan, but was released when Malik Shah died in 1092 in the wake of a quarrel among his jailers. Kilij Arslan then marched at the head of the Turkish Oghuz Yiva tribe army and set up his capital at Nicaea, replacing Amin 'l Ghazni, the governor appointed by Malik Shah I.

Following the death of Malik Shah I the individual tribes, the Danishmends, Mangujekids, Saltuqids, Tengribirmish begs, Artuqids (Ortoqids) and Akhlat-Shahs, had started vying with each other to establish their own independent states. Alexius Comnenus's Byzantine intrigues further complicated the situation. He married Ayşe Hatun, the daughter of the Emir Tzachas/Çaka(Bey) to attempt to ally himself against the Byzantines, who commanded a strong naval fleet. They had four sons: Malik Shah, Mesud I, Arab and Toghrul. In 1094, Kilij Arslan received a letter from Alexius suggesting that the Tzachas sought to target him to move onto the Byzantines, thereupon Kilij Arslan marched with an army to Smyrna, Tzachas's capital, and invited his father-in-law to a banquet in his tent where he slew him while he was intoxicated.

== The Crusades ==
=== People's Crusade ===
The People's Crusade (also called the Peasants' Crusade) army of Peter the Hermit and Walter the Penniless arrived at Nicaea in 1096. They had been able to capture a fort that was a four-day march away from Nicaea, called Xerigordos often referred to as Xerigordon in modern historic literature. A contingent of the crusade overran the castle at Xerigordon and held it until Kilij sent a force to starve them out. Those that renounced Christianity were spared and sent into captivity to the east, the rest were put to death. Kilij Arslan also cunningly sent spies to trick the Crusaders into thinking Xerigordon was ripe for the taking, and the ill-disciplined Crusaders rushed to Xerigordon despite orders against this. They were consequently ambushed, forcing Peter the Hermit eventually to give up the crusade.

The remainder of Peter's crusade composed almost entirely of unarmed civilians was surprised near the village of Civetot by Kilij Arslan's army. They were easily overwhelmed and around 17,000 out of the 20,000 remaining Christians, including soldiers, women and children, were killed. He then invaded the Danishmend Emirate of Malik Ghazi in eastern Anatolia. The First Crusade would start a few months later.

=== First Crusade ===
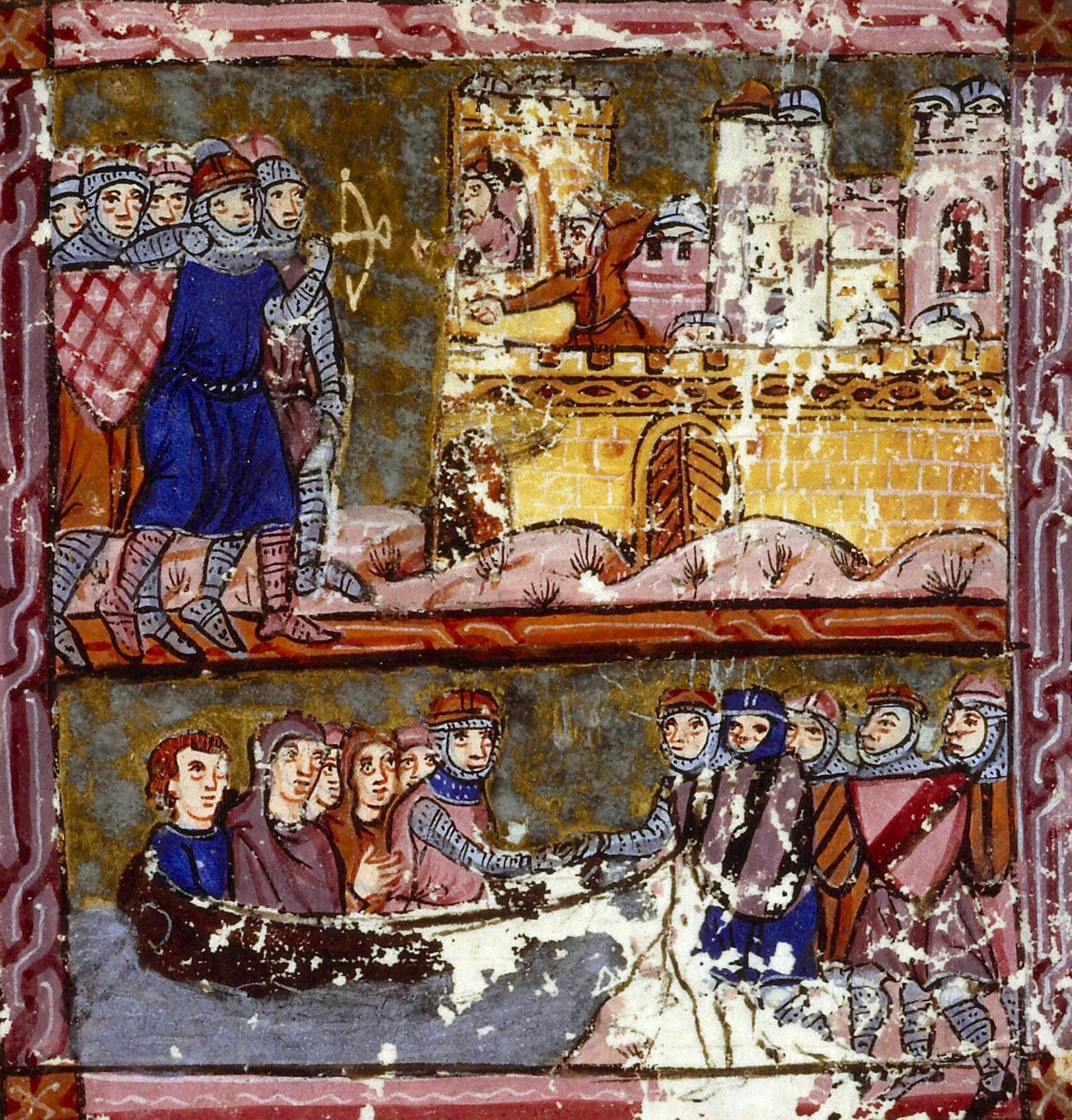
Capture of Kilij Arslan's wife

Because of this easy first victory he did not consider the main crusader army, led by various nobles of western Europe, to be a serious threat. He resumed his war with the Danishmends, and was away from Nicaea when these new Crusaders besieged Nicaea in May 1097. He hurried back to his capital to find it surrounded by the Crusaders, and was defeated in battle with them on 21 May. The city then surrendered to the Byzantines and his wife and children were captured. When the crusaders sent the Sultan's wife to Constantinople, to their dismay she was later returned without ransom in 1097 because of the relationship between Kilij Arslan and Alexios I Komnenos.

As result of the stronger invasion, Rum and the Danishmends allied in their attempt to turn back the crusaders. The Crusaders continued to split their forces as they marched across Anatolia. The combined Danishmend and Rum forces planned to ambush the Crusaders near Dorylaeum on 29 June. However, Kilij Arslan's horse archers could not penetrate the line of defense set up by the Crusader knights, and the main body under Bohemond arrived to capture the Turkish camp on 1 July. In this battle, Kilij Arslan and his troops won the respect of their enemy, as the Gesta Francorum states: "had the Turks been Christian, it would have been impossible to find a people more powerful, more courageous, or more skilled in the art of war."

Kilij Arslan was defeated and settled for harassing the Crusader army with guerilla warfare and hit-and-run tactics. He also destroyed crops and water sources along their route in order to hinder the Crusader Army from collecting supplies, ultimately with little success.

=== Crusade of 1101 ===
Crusade of 1101

In August 1100, the Danishmendid ruler Gazi Gümüshtigin captured Bohemond resulting in a new force of Lombards attempting to rescue him. In their march they took Ankara from Arslan upon the Danishmends. In alliance with Radwan the Atabeg of Aleppo he ambushed this force at the Battle of Mersivan. In 1101 he defeated another Crusader army at Heraclea Cybistra, which had come to assist the fledgling Crusader states in Syria. This was an important victory for the Turks, as it proved that an army of Crusader knights was not invincible. After this victory he moved his capital to Konya and defeated a force led by William II of Nevers who attempted to march upon it as well as the subsequent force a week later.

In 1104 he resumed his war with the Danishmends who were now weakened after the death of Malik Ghazi, demanding half the ransom gained for Bohemond. As a result, Bohemond allied with the Danishmends against Rum and the Byzantines.

== War of Mosul and Death ==
After the crusades he moved towards the east, taking Harran and Diyarbakr. In 1107 Ghazaghli, the castellan of Mosul's citadel, sent a message asking Kilij Arslan for help and support against Jawali Saqawa, the new Atabeg of Mosul appointed by Muhammad I Tapar, Kilij Arslan answered the call and headed towards Mosul, and after taking the oaths of obedience from its population he entered the city and was welcomed by its ruler Zengi ibn Jikirmish and his regents, after appointing his son Malik Shah as ruler, he sat out to fight Jawali. Jawali and Sulayman clashed near Khabur River, despite the strength in numbers, Jawali's forces were more experienced and fierce, while Jawali was busy attacking and nearly killing Jawali, his army was destroyed by the enemy, and he ran away. Believing that he would not be forgiven for trying to challenge Sultan Muhammad I, he entered the river with his horse and kept shooting with his bow at those who pursued him until the horse plunged into the depths, and with the horse, Kilij Arslan drowned.

== Discovery of his burial ==
In January 2021, archaeologists led by professor Ahmet Tanyıldız from the Dicle University discovered his and his daughter Saide Hatun's grave in Silvan, Diyarbakır. Researchers dug two metres deep across a 35-square-metre area and focused their works on two gravesites in Orta Çeşme Park.

== Sources ==
- Brand, Charles M. (1989). "The Turkish Element in Byzantium, Eleventh-Twelfth Centuries". Dumbarton Oaks Papers. 43: 1–25. doi:10.2307/1291603. JSTOR 1291603.
- Claster, Jill N. (2009). Sacred violence: The European crusades to the Middle East, 1095-1396. University of Toronto Press.
- Maalouf, Amin (2012). Crusades Through Arab Eyes. Saqi Books.
- Runciman, Steven (1952). A History of the Crusades, Volume II: The Kingdom of Jerusalem and the Frankish East. Vol. 2. Cambridge: Cambridge University Press.
- Runciman, Steven (1969) [1955]. "The First Crusade: Constantinople to Antioch". In Setton, Kenneth M.; Baldwin, Marshall W. (eds.). A History of the Crusades. Vol. 1 (Second ed.). Madison, Milwaukee, and London: University of Wisconsin Press. ISBN 0-299-04834-9.
- Turan, Osman (1970). "Anatolia in the period of the Seljuks and the Beyliks". In Holt, Peter Malcolm; Lambton, Ann K. S.; Lewis, Bernard (eds.). The Cambridge History of Islam. Vol. 1A. Cambridge University Press.

Preceded by Suleyman I	Sultan of Rûm; 1092–1107	Succeeded by Melikshah
