= Jikirmish =

Shams al-Dawla Jikirmish
- Emir of Mosul; Emir of Cizre

Emir of Mosul
- Reign: 1102-1106
- Predecessor: Musa al-Turkomani
- Successor: Zengi ibn Jikirmish

Emir of Cizre
- Reign: ?-1102
- Successor: Habashi ibn Jikirmish
- Born: 1046
- Died: 1106 (aged 59–60) near Mosul
- Issue: Zengi ibn Jikirmish; Habashi ibn Jikirmish
- Religion: Sunni Muslim
- Military career
- Conflicts: Cizre-Mosul War; Siege of Mosul (1104); Battle of Harran (1104); Campaign on Edessa (1104); War of Mosul (1106-1107); Battle of Kalba (POW)

Shams al-Dawka Jikirmish, also known as Jekermish, Chokurmish or Chökürmish (probably born in 1046, died in 1106), was the Turkoman Atabeg of Mosul from 1102 to 1106 and Emire of Cizre before 1102.

== Biography ==
When Kerbogha, Atabeg of Mosul died in 1102, his successor Sunqurjah was killed by Musa al-Turkomani, Emir of Hasankeyf. Jikirmish was Emir of Cizre at that time. After hearing of Sunqurjah's death, he captured Nusaybin, thus starting a war with Musa that ended in his victory. From that time, he became Emir of Mosul. He also became the adoptive father of Imad al-Din Zengi. Because of the war between Sultan Barkyaruq and Sultan Muhammad, Jikirmish enjoyed an era of independence until a peace was signed between them in 1104. According to the agreement, Mosul was in the domains of Sultan Muhammad. Jikirmish refused to surrender the city, so the sultan besieged him. Jikirmish only yielded after Barkyaruq died. Muhammad I Tapar forgave him and kept him in his office, on the condition that he pay taxes, obey orders, and attend meetings from time to time.

Jikirmish and Sökmen of Mardin defeated the united armies of Bohemond I of Antioch and Baldwin II of Edessa in the Battle of Harran on 7 May 1104 in which Baldwin was captured. He held Baldwin II as a prisoner, having purloined him from the camp of Sökmen. Jikirmish, after an unsuccessful siege at Edessa, fled with Baldwin to Mosul where he held him captive. Tancred, defending Edessa, then captured a Seljuq princess of Jikirmish's household. Jikirmish offered to pay a ransom or to release Baldwin in return for her liberty. Bohemond and Tancred preferred the money and Baldwin remained imprisoned.

Because of his continued disobedience, Muhammad I removed Jikirmish from his position and replaced him with Jawali Saqawa, which Jikirmish refused, thus igniting a war in the region. When Jikirmish heard of Jawli’s arrival, he ordered his armies to come, but the Emir of Erbil, Abu al-Hayja’ Husam al-Din, sought his help and told him that he would be forced to join Jawli if Shams al-Dawla came. Therefore, Jikirmish went out before his armies gathered and met Abu al-Hayja’s forces and his sons in the village of Kalba. There, the Battle of Kalba took place between him and the Sultan’s army, and Jikirmish suffered a terrible defeat. Jikirmish could not escape because he was sick, and Jawli could not capture him until he killed his guards. Then Jawali besieged Mosul, whose inhabitants had appointed Zengi, the son of Jekermish, as their ruler. To exploit Jikirmish, Jawali would take him out every day on the back of a mule to call on his followers to surrender the city, but they did not listen to him. Afterwards, he would be returned to a pit and heavily guarded so that no one could rescue him, until he died in the year 1106 at the age of sixty.

== Sources ==
- Barber, Malcolm (2012). The Crusader States. Yale University Press. ISBN 978-0-300-11312-9.
- Fink, Harold S. (1969) [1955]. "The Foundation of the Latin States, 1099–1118". In Setton, Kenneth M.; Baldwin, Marshall W. (eds.). A History of the Crusades, Volume I: The First Hundred Years. Vol. 1 (Second ed.). Madison, Milwaukee, and London: University of Wisconsin Press. pp. 368–409. ISBN 0-299-04834-9.
- Köhler, Michael (2013). Alliances and Treaties between Frankish and Muslim Rulers in the Middle East: Cross-Cultural Diplomacy in the Period of the Crusades. BRILL. ISBN 978-90-04-24857-1.
- Runciman, Steven (1989). A History of the Crusades, Volume II: The Kingdom of Jerusalem and the Frankish East, 1100-1187. Cambridge University Press. ISBN 0-521-06162-8.

Preceded by Musa al-Turkomani	Emir of Mosul; 1102–1106	Succeeded by Zengi ibn Jikirmish
