= Battle of Harran =

Battle in 1104

- Part of the Crusades
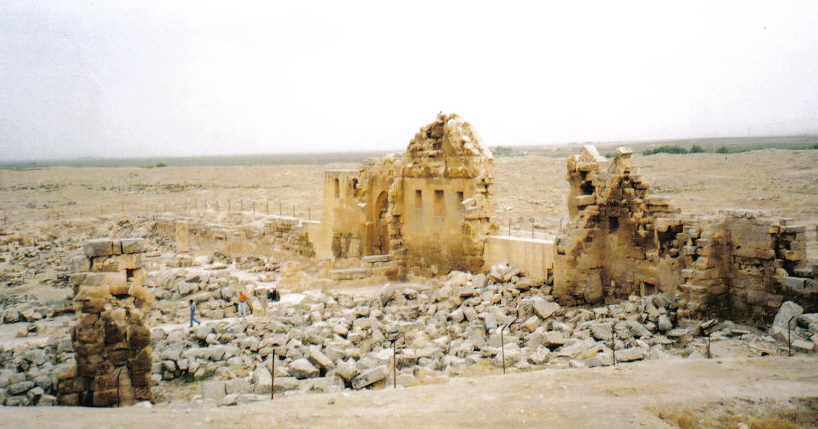
- The ruins of Harran in 2003
Date	7 May 1104
Location	Two days from Harran, in the plain opposite to Raqqa (modern-day Şanlıurfa, Turkey) 36°52′00″N 39°02′00″E
Result	Seljuk victory

Belligerents
Principality of Antioch; County of Edessa	Seljuk Empire: Emirate of Mosul; Artuqids of Mardin

Commanders and leaders
Baldwin II of Edessa (POW), Bohemund I of Antioch, Tancred, Joscelin of Courtenay (POW)	Jikirmish of Mosul; Sokman

Strength
3,000 cavalry 7,000 infantry	20,000

Casualties and losses
5,000 killed	2,000 killed
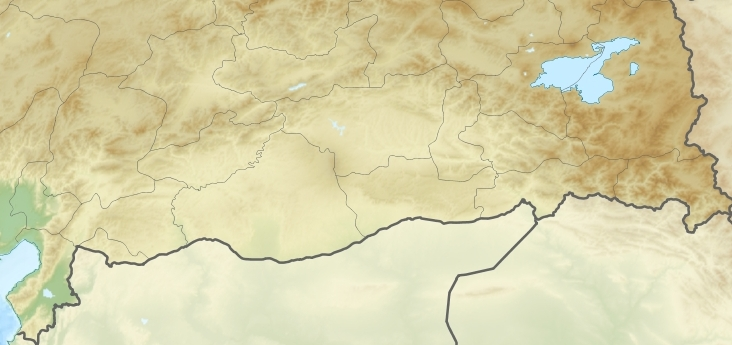
- Location within Southeast Turkey Battle of Harran (Turkey)

The Battle of Harran took place on 7 May 1104 between the Crusader states of the Principality of Antioch and the County of Edessa, and the Seljuk Turks. It was the first major battle against the newfound Crusader states in the aftermath of the First Crusade, marking a key turning point against Frankish expansion. The battle had a disastrous effect on the Principality of Antioch as the Turks regained territory earlier lost.

== Background ==
In 1104 Baldwin II of Edessa had attacked and besieged the city of Harran. For his further support Baldwin sought help from Bohemond I of Antioch and Tancred, Prince of Galilee. Bohemond and Tancred marched north from Antioch to Edessa to join with Baldwin and Joscelin of Courtenay, accompanied by Bernard of Valence the Patriarch of Antioch, Daimbert of Pisa the Patriarch of Jerusalem, and Benedict, the Archbishop of Edessa.

The Seljuks, under Jikirmish, emir of Mosul, and Sokman, the Artuqid emir of Mardin, gathered in the area of the Khabur, perhaps at Ras al-Ayn (Hellenistic Rhesaina). In May 1104 they attacked Edessa, perhaps to distract the Crusaders from Harran, perhaps to take the city while the Crusaders were elsewhere engaged.

== Battle ==
According to contemporary historian Ibn al-Qalanisi, Tancred and Bohemund arrived at Edessa during the siege, but according to Chronicle of 1234 they arrived first at the gates of Harran. In any case, the Seljuks rode away from the Crusaders feigning a retreat, and the Crusaders followed. Contemporary chronicler Matthew of Edessa reports a pursuit of two days while Ralph of Caen reports three days. According to Ibn al-Athir, the main battle was fought 12 kilometres from Harran. Most historians accept the accounts of Albert of Aachen and Fulcher of Chartres, who located the battle on the plain (planitie) opposite the city of Raqqa, Raqqa being about two days away from Harran.

Baldwin and Joscelin commanded the Edessan left wing while Bohemond and Tancred commanded the Antiochene right. Ralph of Caen says that the Crusaders were caught unawares when the Seljuks turned to fight, so much so that Baldwin and Bohemond fought without armor.

During the battle, Baldwin's troops were completely routed, with Baldwin and Joscelin captured by the Turks. The Antiochene troops along with Bohemond were able to escape to Edessa. However, Jikirmish had only taken a small amount of booty, so he purloined Baldwin from Sokman's camp. Although a ransom was paid, Joscelin and Baldwin were not released until sometime before 1108, and 1109 respectively.

== Significance ==
The battle was one of the first decisive Crusader defeats with severe consequences to the Principality of Antioch. The Byzantine Empire took advantage of the defeat to impose their claims on Antioch, and recaptured Latakia and parts of Cilicia. Many of the towns ruled by Antioch revolted and were re-occupied by Muslim forces from Aleppo. Armenian territories also revolted in favour of the Byzantines or Armenia. Furthermore, these events caused Bohemund to return to Italy to recruit more troops, leaving Tancred as regent of Antioch.

William of Tyre writes that there was no battle more disastrous than this. Although Antioch recovered by the next year, the Byzantine emperor Alexius I Komnenos imposed the Treaty of Devol on Bohemond, which would have made Antioch a vassal of the empire had Tancred agreed to it. Antioch was again crushed at the Battle of Ager Sanguinis in 1119. Edessa never really recovered and survived until 1144 but only because of divisions among the Muslims.
