= Siege of Mosul (1104) =

Date	1104
Location	Mosul
Result	Mosul submitted to the Sultan peacefully

Belligerents
Seljuk Empire	Emirate of Mosul

Commanders and leaders
Muhammad I Tapar; Saad al-Mulk	Jikirmish

The Siege of Mosul (1104), was a siege imposed by Muhammad I Tapar on the city of Mosul in 1104, after its governor, Shams al-Dawla Jikirmish, refused to submit to him.

== Background ==
After the death of the Emir of Mosul, Karbuqa, in August-September 1102, Shams al-Dawla Jikirmish, the governor of Cizre, took over the rule after him. Jikermish took over during a period of Seljuk civil war between Sultan Barkiyaruq and his brother Sultan Muhammad, but peace was made between them in 1104, and according to the agreement, Muhammad obtained the northern regions of the state, so he quickly headed to Maragheh in the north of Persia and from there to Erbil, intending to take Mosul over.

=== Preparations ===
When Jikirmish heard of the Sultan's forces coming, he prepared to defend the city. He renewed the Mosul wall and repaired what needed repairing, and ordered the peasants and residents in the vicinity of Mosul to enter the city, and confiscated the money of those who did not carry out the orders.

== Siege ==
The Sultan's forces surrounded the city and began the siege. Sultan Muhammad sent a message to Jikirmish informing him of the peace treaty between him and Barkiyaruq, one of whose terms was that the Jazira region would be given to Muhammad. He presented him with documents from Barkiyaruq ordering Jikirmish to surrender Mosul to Muhammad, promising to confirm him as governor if he obeyed. However, Jikirmish replied, "The letters from Sultan Barkiyaruq reached me after the peace treaty, ordering me not to surrender the city to anyone else." When Sultan Muhammad saw Jikirmish's refusal to surrender, he declared war.

The Sultan's army marched on Mosul, spearheaded by a force of sappers and tanks, but they were met with fierce resistance from the people of Mosul and its soldiers. During the siege, Jikirmish opened some secret gates in the wall, allowing groups to wage guerrilla warfare against the Sultan's camp, inflicting heavy losses. A group of Jikirmish's men gathered at Tell Ya'far and launched raids on the camp, disrupting the arrival of supplies and provisions to the Sultan and his soldiers. The local resistance was also active. The Sultan's soldiers managed to create a hole in the Mosul wall and withdrew because the day ended and the night came. In the morning, they found that it had been repaired and filled with fighters. Imad al-Din Khalil believes that one of the reasons for this was the good economic situation inside the city, as food prices were cheap.

The fighting continued until 9 February 1104, when news of the death of Sultan Barkiyaruq reached Jekermish. He convened a consultative council made up of the notables of the country, asking them what to do, but they advised him to consult the soldiers. So he gathered the senior commanders of the army, who advised him to submit to the authority of Sultan Muhammad, since he was the only sultan in the arena after the death of his brother.

== Peace and end of the siege ==
Jikirmish sent to the Sultan, declaring his obedience and requesting a meeting with his minister, Saad al-Mulk. The meeting took place, and the minister told him that he needed to meet Sultan Muhammad. Despite the pessimism of the civilians about this meeting, Jikirmish went ahead and met Sultan Muhammad, who greeted him with a warm welcome and embrace. He did not prolong his stay but confirmed him in his position and ordered him to return to Mosul. So he returned with a group of the Sultan's entourage. Jikirmish did not agree to the Sultan's offer afterward to enter Mosul in a celebratory procession, but instead, Jekermish sent him many gifts and treasures. The Sultan then departed.
