= Bursuq the Elder =

Seljuk official

First Shihna of Baghdad
- In office April 1060 – 1061
- Succeeded by: Oshin

Personal details
- Died: September 1097; Sarakhs

Bursuq (died 1097), often recorded as Bursuq the Elder and Amir Ispahsalar Bursuq, was a prominent political and military figure of the Great Seljuk Empire and the founder of the Bursuqid dynasty, the local governors of Luristan and northern Khuzestan.

== Career ==
Nothing is known about his early life. Some have suggested that Bursuq was a ghulam of Tughril, which is unlikely. Instead, he might have been a ghulam of the Hasanuyah dynasty who inherited the properties and position of the latter.

Bursuq is first recorded as the first shihna of Baghdad; he was appointed at the post by Tughril in April 1060 after the latter's domination of the Abbasid capital. In early 1061, he managed to persuade the caliph to accept a marriage between his daughter or sister and the Seljuk ruler. Bursuq was succeeded by a certain ghulam, Oshin, in the same year. Bursuq was a companion of Tughril in his last days. After the latter's death, Bursuq is recorded to have accompanied Alp Arslan in the latter's 1065 expedition against Fars.

Bursuq disappears from historical records for 15 years until 1078, this may be explained by Nizam al-Mulk's reforms which decreased the power of the emirs. During this period, he began governing the territories of Luristan and north of Khuzestan, which marks the beginning of the hereditary government of the Bursuqid dynasty over this region. Their seat was apparently based in the city of Shushtar, the most important settlement of this region.

Bursuq reappears in records as a political figure after several years. in 1078, he was sent by Alp Arslan to Anatolia to suppress the rebellion of Sulayman and Mansur, the sons of Qutalmish. Despite Bursuq's victory, Sulayman remained in power in western and southern Anatolia. In August 1086, the Seljuk sultan commanded the campaign himself, sending Bursuq and several other emirs as the advance guard. Bursuq was subsequently appointed as the Seljuk commander in the conflicts against the Byzantine Empire under Alexios I Komnenos. Hamadani records that Bursuq was settled near the Gulf of Alexandretta.

In April 1087, during the marriage ceremony of the daughter of the Seljuk sultan Malikshah I and the Abbasid caliph al-Muqtadi (r. 1075–1094), Bursuq was among the emirs escorting the caravan of the bride to Baghdad. This suggests that Bursuq retained his high positions during Malikshah I's reign. After Malikshah I's death in 1092, Bursuq, now recorded as Amir Ispahsalar Bursuq the Elder, supported Barkiyaruq. During Tutush's rebellion, Bursuq attempted to persuade the former's lieutenants to abandon their support for Tutush. Bursuq fought alongside Barkiyaruq in the Battle of Mosul against Tutush in 1094 and continued his support for Barkiyaruq after the latter's defeat and flight to Isfahan. His full support for Barkiyaruq proved to be rewarding as the sultan eventually became victorious and Bursuq strengthened his position in the Seljuk court. To suppress the 1096 rebellion of Arslan Arghun in Khurasan, Barkiyaruq appointed Ahmad Sanjar as the ruler of that province and appointed Bursuq as his atabeg. On their way, Bursuq was assassinated by a Nizari from Quhistan in September 1097 near Sarakhs.

The Nizaris' motivation for the attack may have been due to Bursuq's possible anti-Nizari activities; many Nizaris were active in southeast of Shushtar. Bursuq's sons and allies blamed Barkiyaruq's vizier Majd al-Mulk Qumi for involvement in the assassination and murdered him in 1099 in Sujas.

== Children ==
Four of Bursuq's sons are recorded: Ilbegi (ایلبگی), Zangi (زنگی), Aq-Buri (آق‌بوری), and a namesake son (Bursuq II), who was the most famous one.

One of Bursuq's daughters was married to Fakhr al-Dawlah Chawli, the Seljuk emir of Arrajan and nearby regions.
