= Husam al-Din Abu'l-Hayja =

Kurdish aristocrat and general of the Ayyubid Dynasty

- Emir

Emir of Nisibis
- Reign: 1182-1189
- Predecessor: Zengids

Emir of Jerusalem
- Reign: 10th September 1195-13 July 1196
- Predecessor: ‘Izz al-Din Jurduk al-Nuri
- Successor: Shams al-Din Sungur al-Kabir
- Born: Erbil, Hadhbani Emirate
- Died: 1197; Daquq, Abbasid caliphate
Names
- Husam al-Din Abu'l-Hayja al-Samin al-Hadhbani
- Dynasty: Hadhabani
Husam al-Din Abu'l-Hayja
- Military career
- Allegiance: Zengids; Ayyubids; Abbasids
- Rank: sepahsalar
- Units: Al-Mihraniyya; Al-Salahiya
- Conflicts: Turan-Shah's Nubian campaign; Battle of the Horns of Hama; Third Crusade; Siege of Acre; Upper Egyptian Fatimid Revolts

Husam al-Din Abu'l-Hayja, also known as al-Samin (lit. 'the Fat') and al-Hadhbani, was a Kurdish general and aristocrat in service of the Ayyubid dynasty. He was the commander of the Salahiya regiment of Saladin and a prominent figure in the Third Crusade.

Husam al-Din played an important role in Saladin's war against the Crusaders and in the conquest of Levant and Upper Mesopotamia. He also aided al-Afdal on his power struggle against his relatives.

== Early life ==
Husam al-Din Abu'l-Hayja was born in Erbil, a Kurd hailing from the Hadhabani tribe. However according to Ibn Athir he was of the Hkmi clan which belongs to Hadhbani tribe. He was known as Abu-Hayja (lit. 'Man of war' or 'Father of war') and al-Samin ('fat, obese') for his unusual fatness, although the fat should be read as a sign of good health

== Personality and appearance ==
Abu'l-Hayja was nicknamed "al-Samin" for his monstrous obesity. He must have been a merciless man, however all sources praise him for his courage. He was highly trusted commander by Saladin.

== Military career ==
=== Zengid and Ayyubid Service ===
Abu'l-Hayja was the Ispahsalar of the Kurdish Mihraniyya corps, and tribal chief of Hadhabani tribe in the service of the Zengids and later the Ayyubids in 1171. In 1174 he was given a fiefdom in upper Egypt by Saladin. In 1182 he was appointed as governor of Nisibis up until 1189. He was commander of the Ayyubid garrison in the Siege of Acre from August 1189 – 1191. After the death of Saladin in 1193, Abu'l-Hayja participated in internal Ayyubid power struggle. He first sided with al-Aziz Uthman, but defected to al-Afdal's side on 10 September 1195. Al-Afdal rewarded him with the governorship of Jerusalem. However when al-Aziz Uthman retook Jerusalem on 13 July 1196, he stripped Abu'l-Hayja al-Samin of the governorship of Jerusalem and appointed Shams al-Din Sungur al-Kabir in his place. Abu'l-Hayja was sent into exile. Abandoning the Ayyubids, he went to Iraq to seek service with the Abbasid Caliphate.

=== Abbasid service ===
After his exile by al-Aziz Uthman in 1196, he went to Mosul and stayed there for 2 years. After that he went to the caliph of Baghdad and served as a military commander. The caliph sent him against the Eldiguzid ruler of Adharbayjan, Muzaffar al-Din Uzbek, who by that time was occupying Hamadan. Despite his obesity, Abu'l-Hayja displayed much energy on this new ground and was able to capture Ozbek and his associates. The caliph was alarmed by his forceful methods and ordered him to return.

== Death & Legacy ==
After his campaign against The Eldiguzids, he died in Daquq in 1197, while on his way to return to his hometown Erbil.

For his monstrous obesity and courage, extra-size bowls fabricated in Baghdad were called Abu'l-Hayja in honour of him.

The settlement of Kaukab Abu al-Hija, founded by his relatives in Palestine was named after him.

== Sources ==
- Humphreys, Stephen (1977), From Saladin to the Mongols: The Ayyubids of Damascus, 1193–1260, SUNY Press, ISBN 978-0-87395-263-7
- Minorsky, Vladimir (1953). Studies in Caucasian History. New York: Taylor’s Foreign Press. ISBN 0-521-05735-3.
