= Siege of Acre (1104) =

1104 battle of the Crusaders

- Part of the Crusades
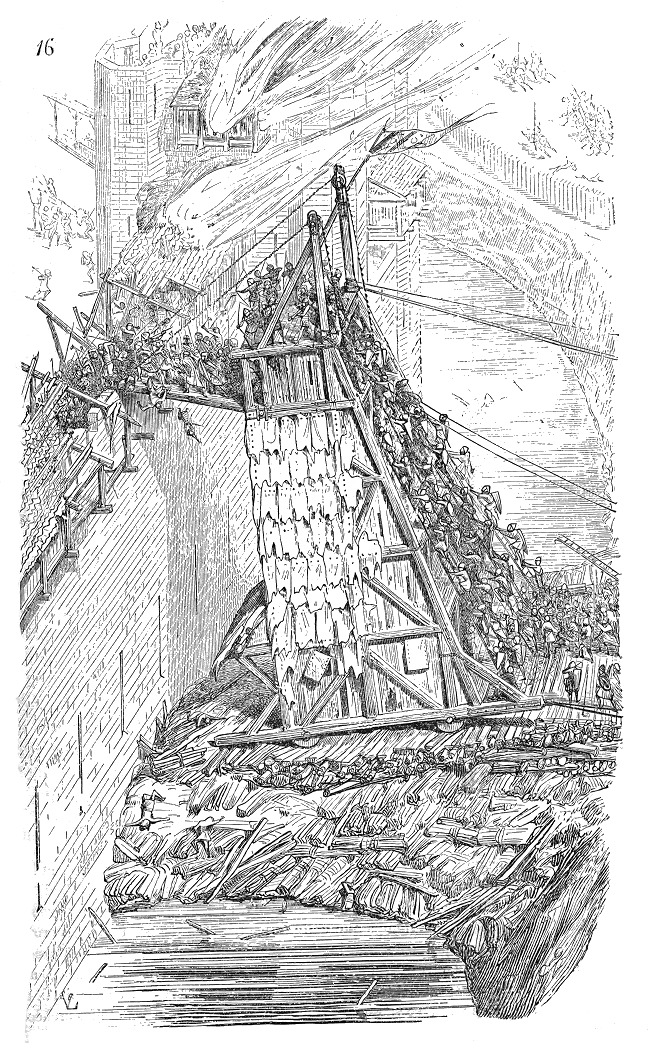
- A siege tower in action; French depiction of the 19th century
Date	6 May 1104 – 25 May 1104
Location	Acre, Levant 32°55′34″N 35°05′02″E
Result	Crusader victory

Belligerents
Kingdom of Jerusalem; Republic of Genoa	Fatimid Caliphate

Commanders and leaders
Baldwin I	Zahr al-Dawlah al-Juyushi

Strength
Unknown	Unknown

Casualties and losses
Unknown	According to Christian sources, around 4,000 during the sack of the city alone

The siege of Acre took place in May 1104. It was of great importance for the consolidation of the Kingdom of Jerusalem, which had been created five years earlier. With the help of a Genoese fleet, King Baldwin I forced the surrender of the important port city after a siege that lasted 20 days. Although all defenders and residents wishing to leave the city had been assured by the king that they would be free to leave, taking their chattels with them, many of them had been massacred by the Genoese as they left the city. Moreover, the attackers sacked the city.

== Background ==
Following the successful siege of Jerusalem, the Crusaders were forced by strategic and economic needs to focus their main interest on conquering and securing the coastal cities of the Levant and their hinterland. Only a fraction of what later became the territory of the Kingdom of Jerusalem was under their actual control at this time. Jerusalem, the capital of the kingdom, had access to the sea only through a narrow corridor running through Ramla and Lydda to Jaffa. Like most other parts of the country, however, that route could only be used with appropriate military cover. (Note: Sæwulf, a pilgrim traveling through the Kingdom of Jerusalem in the early 12th century, and writing an account entitled Relatio de peregrinatione ad Hierosolymam, was appalled at how dangerous the journey from the Mediterranean coast up to Jerusalem.)

Raids were conducted from the cities still held by the Egyptian Fatimids. Muslim refugees holed up in the mountains, and Bedouins from the desert roamed everywhere, posing a constant threat to trade and supply routes; the ships stationed in the Muslim coastal towns, in turn, threatened sea communications, cutting off or disrupting the supply of men and materiel from the West essential to the kingdom's political and military survival.

With the death of Godfrey of Bouillon, the first ruler of the Kingdom of Jerusalem, these problems were left to his successor, King Baldwin I, to solve. He had no naval forces and his land forces were extremely small, (Note: Since most of the crusaders had returned home after conquering Jerusalem, it was estimated that Baldwin I probably had no more than 200 knights and 1,000 infantry at his disposal when he came to power.) hence he pursued an energetic policy of conquest to secure his empire from the start and snatched Arsuf and Caesarea from the Muslims as early as 1101. Afterwards, the Fatimid counter-offensives launched from Egypt had to be repelled, which led to the two battles of Ramla in September 1101 and May 1102. The Fatimids suffered a decisive defeat in May 1102 at the battle of Jaffa, and their last campaign in 1103, led by Taj al-Ajam and Ibn Qadus, was also unsuccessful. Baldwin then was able to resume his offensive to conquer the coastal towns.

Baldwin attempted a siege of Acre in 1103. The arrival of Muslim galleys from Tyre and Sidon brought reinforcements to Acre, and Baldwin was forced to retreat.

== Siege ==
In May 1104, a Genoese fleet of allegedly 70 ships arrived in Haifa. They had previously supported Raymond of Toulouse in conquering Byblos. Baldwin, seeing the opportunity before him, entered into negotiations with the Genoese, which ended in their agreeing to support him if after taking Acre they would receive a third of the spoils, trade privileges and a settlement in the business district of the city.

On 6 May 1104, the allies began a second siege of Acre. Baldwin's army surrounded the city from the land side, while the Genoese fleet blocked the sea side. The garrison of Acre initially put up fierce resistance. With no assistance from Egypt, the Fatimid governor of Acre, the Mamluk Bena, better known as Zahr ad-Dawlah al-Juyushi, offered to surrender to the besiegers, on same terms as granted in Arsuf.

All residents who wished to leave Acre to Ascalon would be allowed to do so with their chattels, but the rest would remain as Frankish subjects and even maintain their mosques. Baldwin accepted the terms, and the city was handed over to the Crusaders 20 days after the siege began. (Note: The governor, Zahr ad-Dawlah al-Juyushi, "went away [after the surrender]," reported Ibn al-Athir. He went first to Damascus, where he stayed for a while, then returned to Egypt and apologized to the Fatimid vizier al-Afdal Shahanshah for the surrender of Acre. The vizier accepted the apology.) Chronicler Albert of Aix reports: "When the Genoese saw how [the Muslims] went out with all their household goods and dragged their treasures with them, they were blinded by avarice and greed, broke into the city, killed the citizens and robbed them of gold, silver, purple fabrics and other valuables”. Furthermore, “[t]he Frankish people [were] seized by the flame of greed" and took part in the plundering, which is said to have cost the lives of about 4,000 inhabitants and defenders of Acre. Baldwin was furious of the misconducts of the Genoese and decided to punish them; however, the Patriarch Evremar reconciled the two parties, and he had to grant one-third of the town to them.

== Aftermath ==
Soon after its conquest, Acre became the main trading center and main port of the Kingdom of Jerusalem. With Acre being heavily fortified, the kingdom had a safe harbor. Although Jaffa was much closer to Jerusalem, it was only an open roadstead and too shallow for large ships. Passengers and cargo could only be brought ashore or unloaded there with the help of small ferry boats, which was a particularly dangerous undertaking in stormy seas. (Note: Sæwulf witnessed how more than 20 ships of the flotilla with which he had come were wrecked in the storm and numerous pilgrims drowned.) Although Haifa's roadstead was deeper and protected from south and west winds by Mount Carmel, it was particularly exposed to north winds.

== Sources ==
- Gabrieli, Francesco (1976). The Crusades from an Arab Perspective. Selected and translated from the Arabic sources. Munich: Dtv. ISBN 3-423-04172-2.
- Milger, Peter (1988). Die Kreuzzüge. Krieg im Namen Gottes (in German). Munich: C. Bertelsmann. ISBN 3-570-07356-4.
- Runciman, Steven (1952). A History of the Crusades, Volume Two: The Kingdom of Jerusalem and the Frankish East, 1100-1187. Cambridge University Press. ISBN 9780521347716.
- Rogers, Randall (1997). Latin Siege Warfare in the Twelfth Century. Clarendon Press. ISBN 0-19-820689-5.
