= Siege of Acre =

Siege of Acre, also Siege of Akka/Akko, may refer to:

- Siege of Acre (1103), first crusader attack
- Siege of Acre (1104), following the First Crusade
- Siege of Acre (1189–1191), during the Third Crusade
- Siege of Acre (1257–1258), during the War of Saint Sabas
- Siege of Acre (1263), Baibars laid siege to the Crusader city, but abandoned it to attack Nazareth.
- Siege of Acre (1291), the fall of the final Crusader city in the Levant
- Siege of Acre (1799), during the French Revolutionary Wars
- Siege of Acre (1821), part of Ottoman power struggles
- Siege of Akka (1832), by Ibrahim Pasha of Egypt

== See also ==
- Battle of Acre (disambiguation)
