= Battle of Jaffa (1102) =

- Part of the Crusades
Date	27 May 1102
Location	Jaffa
Result	Crusader victory

Belligerents
Kingdom of Jerusalem	Fatimid Caliphate

Commanders and leaders
Baldwin I of Jerusalem; Hugh of St-Omer	Sama' al-Mulk Husayn

Strength
170 knights + large number of English, French, & German crusaders	Unknown

Casualties and losses
light	3,000 killed

The Battle of Jaffa was a military engagement between the Crusaders and the Fatimid army at Jaffa. The Fatimids, who were blockading Jaffa, were routed by the Crusaders led by King Baldwin I of Jerusalem, inflicting a crushing defeat.

== Prelude ==
After the defeat at the battle of Ramla on May 17, 1102, the Crusader king, Baldwin I of Jerusalem, escaped to the coast. Baldwin attempted to reach Jaffa; however, the Fatimid troops were already roaming in the countryside searching for any Crusader survivor from the battle. For two days and nights, Baldwin wandered on foot through hills north of Ramla, avoiding Fatimid patrols. Baldwin successfully reached Arsuf on the 19th. Its governor, Roger of Haifa, was surprised to see Baldwin alive. In the same evening, Crusader reinforcements of 80 knights under Hugh of Saint-Omer arrived at Arsuf.

Hugh began trying his way out to Jaffa while Baldwin rode on a ship belonging to an Englishman. The Fatimids noticed this and dispatched one of their ships to chase it, but the winds from the north saved Baldwin. He managed to reach Jaffa. There he organized his troops and even rode out to bring Hugh's troops safely to Jaffa, which was done successfully before the Fatimids had entirely begun blockading. Baldwin dispatched messages to Jerusalem for help. A force of 90 knights arrived in Jaffa carrying the relic of the True Cross, forcing their way to Jaffa. Baldwin also dispatched messages to the Northern Crusader states.

Before they could respond, 200 English ships carrying English, French, and German soldiers and pilgrims arrived in Jaffa, passing the Fatimid blockade. Now Jaffa was reinforced with enough men.

== Battle ==
On May 27, the Crusaders marched out of Jaffa to fight. The Fatimids attempted to lure out the Crusaders and encircle them. The knights charged at the Fatimids, scattering them. Every time the knights were charging, the Fatimids attacked the infantry, forcing the knights to fall back to defend them. The infantry, however, held together and bombarded the Fatimids with showers of arrows. Coupled with knight charges, the Fatimids were routed and escaped to Ascalon. The Crusaders were few in number to chase them, but they managed to capture the Fatimid camp, alongside their donkeys and camels. The Fatimids lost 3,000 men in the end. The Fatimid cavalry left early on, and their infantry, stationed in the center, bore the brunt of casualties.

== Aftermath ==
The battle saved the kingdom of Jerusalem from the Fatimid threat. Had they capitalized on their victory in Ramla, the Fatimids with small forces could've recaptured Jerusalem from Crusader control. The Fatimid leadership displayed indecisiveness, which allowed the Crusaders to regroup.

== Sources ==
- Steven Runciman (1952), A History of the Crusades, Volume II: The Kingdom of Jerusalem and the Frankish East, 1100–1187.
- Ian Heath (2019), Armies and Enemies of the Crusades Second Edition.
- Steve Tibble (2018), The Crusader Armies.
