= Battle of Jaffa =

The Battle of Jaffa can refer to:

- The Taking of Joppa (1456 BC)
- Battle of Jaffa (1102)
- Battle of Jaffa (1192)
- Battle of Jaffa (1197)
- Battle of Jaffa (1256)
- Siege of Jaffa (1798)
- Battle of Jaffa (1917)
- Battle of Jaffa (1948)
- Operation Hametz
