= Bagrat of Ravendel =

Ruler of Ravendel until 1116

Bagrat (died 1116), also known as Pakrad, was an Armenian adventurer and brother of Kogh Vasil. Kogh was among a number of Armenian princes who had established small city-states in the region during the collapse of centralised Abbasid power following the rise of the Seljuks.

Once in the Emperor Alexios Komnenos' service, Bagrat met Baldwin of Boulogne during the Siege of Nicaea. After befriending Baldwin, Bagrat entered his service and joined him in his march to the Euphrates. Two great fortresses were taken during this march: Ravendel and Turbessel. Baldwin granted Ravendel to Bagrat and Turbessel to a local Armenian noble who had joined him, named Fer.

Early in 1098, while Baldwin considered an offer from Thoros, ruler of Edessa, to come to his aid, Bagrat expressed discontent with that course of action. Some sources claim that Bagrat went further, installing his son as ruler of Ravendel and refusing entry to the fortress to Baldwin and his men. Fer, the Armenian noble who ruled Turbessel, reported to Baldwin that Bagrat was conspiring against him with Turks. Bagrat was asked to surrender the fortress he had been given and, when he refused, was arrested by Baldwin's troops and tortured. Later, Bagrat escaped or was released and took to the mountains, where he was soon joined by his brother.

Bagrat may have become lord of Khoros (Cyrrhus) in 1116. There is some dispute over whether this Bagrat was the same man. Regardless, he was defeated by Baldwin, and Khoros was absorbed into the County of Edessa in 1117.

== Bibliography ==
- Albert of Aachen, Historia Ierosolimitana, ed. and trans. S. Edgington, Oxford: Oxford Medieval Texts, 2007
- Setton, Kenneth M.; Baldwin, Marshall W., eds. (1969) [1955]. A History of the Crusades, Volume I: The First Hundred Years. Vol. 1 (Second ed.). Madison, Milwaukee, and London: University of Wisconsin Press. ISBN 0-299-04834-9.
- Edgington, Susan B. Baldwin I of Jerusalem, 1100-1118, Routledge, 2019
- MacEvitt, Christopher, The Crusades and the Christian World of the East: Rough Tolerance, University of Pennsylvania Press, 2010
- Runciman, Steven, A History of the Crusades, Volume One: The First Crusade and the Foundation of the Kingdom of Jerusalem, Cambridge University Press, London, 1951
- Runciman, Steven, A History of the Crusades, Volume Two: The Kingdom of Jerusalem and the Frankish East, 1100-1187, Cambridge University Press, London, 1952
- Tyerman, Christopher, God's War: A New History of the Crusades, Harvard University Press, Cambridge, MA, 2006
