= Arda of Armenia =

Queen of Jerusalem in the early 1100s

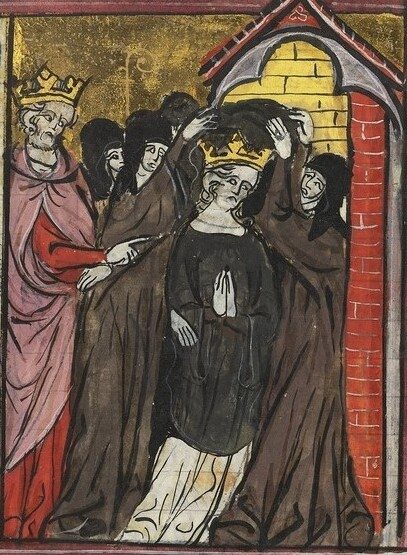
A 14th-century depiction of Baldwin forcing his queen into a convent

Arda (fl. 1097–1117) was an Armenian noblewoman who became the first queen of Jerusalem in 1100. A wealthy heiress, she became countess of Edessa upon marrying the crusader Baldwin of Boulogne shortly after October 1097. She moved to Palestine after Baldwin became the first king of Jerusalem, and assumed authority when he was rumored to have died in battle in 1101. Baldwin eventually repudiated her and consigned her to a monastery, but she left ostensibly to collect funds and never returned. She was still alive in Constantinople in late 1116 or early 1117 when Baldwin promised to recall her.

== Background ==
The first queen of Jerusalem is conventionally called Arda, a name that can be traced to the 18th-century clergyman and historian Sebastiano Paoli. However, none of the 12th-century chroniclers refer to her by name, and it remains uncertain. She may have borne the Greek name Arete.

Ethnically, Arda was Armenian; the chronicler Albert of Aachen describes her as the "daughter of a certain prince who was brother of Constantine, called Taphnuz, who occupied many fortresses and defences in the mountains". This Taphnuz is commonly identified as a brother of the Cilician ruler Constantine the Roupenian, supposedly named Thoros, although Constantine is not otherwise known to have had a brother by that name. Instead, her father may have been the lord Tatoul of Marash or Dawt‘ouk, brother of the lord Constantine of Gargar. She was an only child and probably a great heiress.

== Countess ==
Baldwin of Boulogne, one of the leaders of the First Crusade, lost his wife, Godehilde of Tosny, in October 1097. He was childless and in need of money for the defense of his newly established County of Edessa. A marriage was soon arranged between him and Arda, who was promised a dowry of 60,000 bezants, but only 7,000 were paid. Arda probably belonged to the Armenian Church, while Baldwin was Roman Catholic, but this does not seem to have posed any obstacles to their marriage. They spoke no common language; Arda probably knew some Greek, which could be translated for Baldwin into Latin or Norman.

Aside from becoming countess of Edessa, Arda's life remained unchanged; she still associated mostly with Armenians, although she probably met some leading crusaders, including Baldwin's brothers Godfrey of Bouillon and Eustace III of Boulogne. Baldwin spent much of his time away from Edessa, fighting Turks. He severely punished his subjects when they plotted against him; Arda's father then fled to the mountains, fearing for his life because her dowry had not been paid, and eventually took refuge in Constantinople.

== Queen ==
Godfrey of Bouillon, ruler of Jerusalem, died in 1100, and his men summoned his brother Baldwin to succeed him. Baldwin and Arda left Edessa at the same time in October. Knowing that they would likely be attacked on their march south, Baldwin arranged for Arda and her ladies to wait at Antioch for a ship to take them to Jaffa, the only coastal city then in the possession of the Jerusalemite ruler. Because Turks followed Baldwin along the coast in boats and a winter journey far from the coast was dangerous, Arda probably spent the winter at Antioch's Port Saint Simeon and set out for Jaffa in early 1101. Chroniclers do not mention her presence at Baldwin's entry into Jerusalem or at his coronation as the first king of Jerusalem in Betlehem on 25 December 1100.

Arda arrived in Jaffa in 1101, probably soon after the spring equinox. Shortly before 21 April, Baldwin received a Genoese fleet which had spent the winter in Latakia; these ships may have escorted Arda. While Baldwin conquered the Palestinian coast, news arrived in late August of the advance of a Fatimid army from Egypt. The king set out to meet the Egyptians in early September, while the queen remained in Jaffa and came under siege from a contingent of the Fatimid army. After the battle of Ramla, the Egyptians brought the crusaders' shields and weapons before the city walls and claimed that the king and all his men were slain to encourage the defenders to surrender. The queen ordered that an appeal for help be sent by sea to Tancred, ruler of Antioch. Baldwin had survived, however, and returned to Jaffa.

Arda was again in Jaffa when Baldwin fought the next battle of Ramla in 1102, and he was again rumored to have been killed. This time, Egyptians presented a mutilated corpse clad in royal garments. Queen Arda and the terrified citizens contemplated fleeing Jaffa by sea, but Baldwin returned after a week.

== Separation ==
At some point, Baldwin repudiated Arda. The contemporary chronicler Guibert of Nogent claims that this happened because Arda had been raped by pirates during a sea voyage. This may refer to her journey from Saint Simeon to Jaffa in 1101; alternatively, she may have been sent to Constantinople to pressure her father to pay her dowry. Guibert's account is doubtful.

Writing decades later, William of Tyre implies that the royal marriage broke down around 1105 and explains that some people thought that the queen had been unfaithful, while others believed that the king wished to make a better match. Baldwin's chaplain Fulcher of Chartres says nothing, which suggests that Arda was not to blame. Baldwin may have regarded Arda's appeal to Tancred as a betrayal. In any case, Baldwin had political motives to end the union: marriage to an Armenian noblewoman was not as advantageous in Jerusalem as it had been in Edessa, her dowry remained unpaid, and the couple had no children. William notes that Arda was set aside "without due process of law".

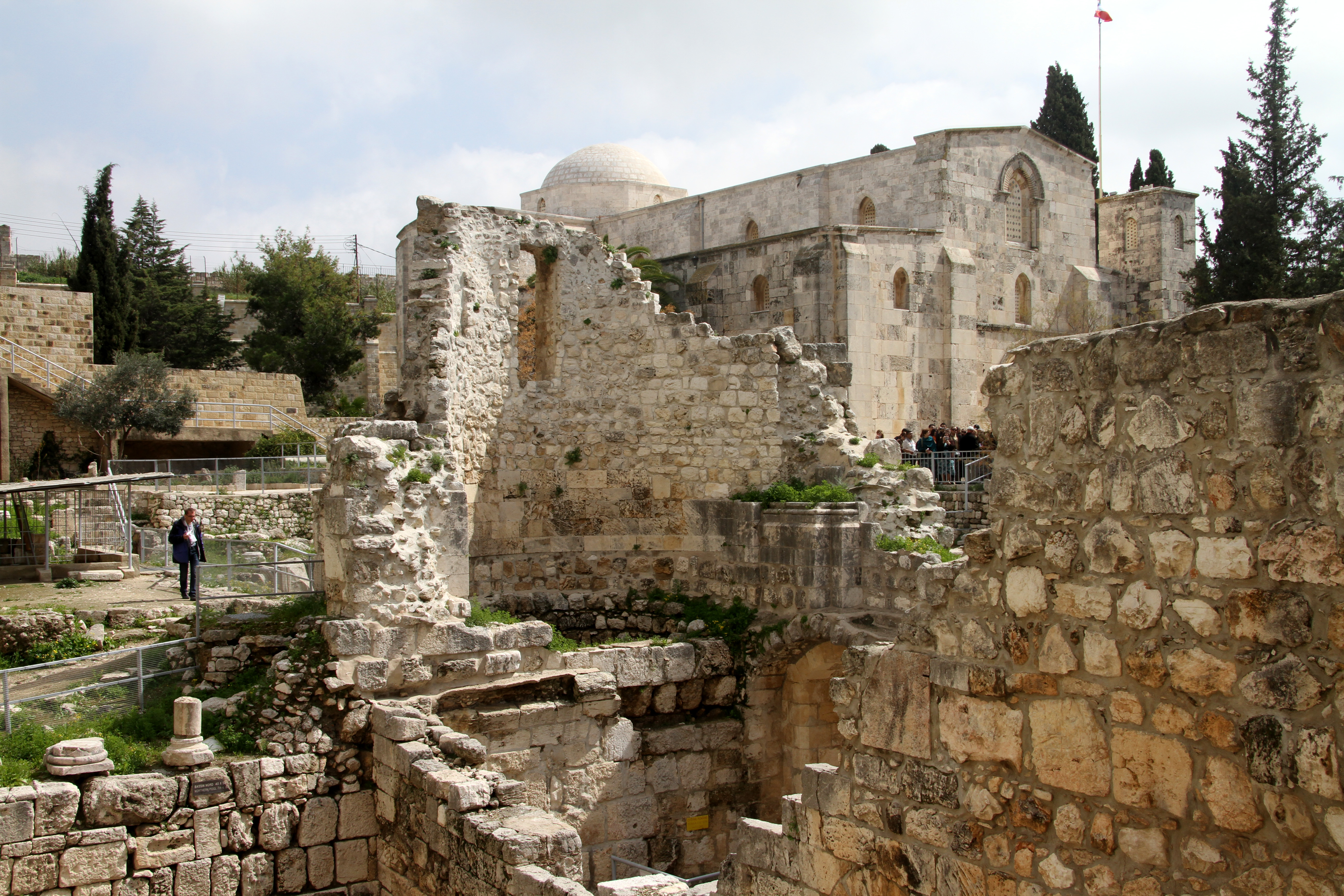
Arda spent some years as a nun at Saint Anne's, but left thanks to a ruse.

After separation, Arda was forced to become a nun at the Convent of Saint Anne in Jerusalem. Baldwin endowed the convent in return. She lived there for some years before she asked Baldwin for permission to go solicit funds for the convent from her family in Constantinople. When she arrived in Constantinople, she took off her religious habit and—according to William—led a promiscuous life.

In 1112, the Latin patriarch of Jerusalem, Arnulf of Chocques, convinced Baldwin to marry the rich Countess Adelaide of Sicily. Because Arda was still alive in Constantinople, Baldwin's marriage to Adelaide was considered bigamous and Pope Paschal II berated Arnulf for it in July 1116. When Baldwin fell seriously ill some months later, his clergy convinced him that he lived in bigamy, and he then vowed to separate from Adelaide and recall Arda. Adelaide left in 1117, but Arda never returned. Baldwin died the following year.

Royal titles
New title	Queen consort of Jerusalem; 1100–1105	Vacant Title next held by Adelaide del Vasto
