= Battle of Ramla (1101) =

Battle in the Middle East

Coordinates: 31°55′29.26″N 34°52′21.75″E

First Battle of Ramla
- Part of the Crusades
Date	7 September 1101
Location	Ramla
Result	Crusader victory

Belligerents
Kingdom of Jerusalem	Fatimid Caliphate

Commanders and leaders
Baldwin I of Jerusalem	Sa'd al-Dawla al-Qawwasi

Strength
1,160 260 knights 900 infantry	Modern estimates: 3,000–5,000; Contemporary sources: 32,000 11,000 cavalry 21,000 infantry

Casualties and losses
80 knights killed 80+ infantry killed	Contemporary sources: 5,000 killed

The First Battle of Ramla (or Ramleh) took place on 7 September 1101 between the Kingdom of Jerusalem and the Fatimids of Egypt. The town of Ramla lay on the road from Jerusalem to Ascalon, the latter of which was the largest Fatimid fortress in Palestine. From Ascalon the Fatimid vizier, Al-Afdal Shahanshah, launched almost annual attacks into the newly founded Crusader kingdom from 1099 to 1107. It was thrice the case that the two armies met each other at Ramla.

== Battle ==
The Egyptians were led by Sa'd al-Dawla al-Qawwasi, former governor of Beirut, while the Crusaders were under the command of King Baldwin I. Baldwin had 260 cavalry and 900 foot soldiers under his command, leaving him severely outnumbered by the Egyptian army, which was estimated at 32,000 men by Fulcher of Chartres, and downgraded to 3,000–5,000 by modern historians. Upon sighting the Fatimid army, Baldwin arrayed his force in six divisions, commanding the reserve force himself.

In the initial attack, the first two Crusader divisions were wiped out while the vanguard took heavy casualties too, with Geldemar Carpinel among the slain. The battle seemed to be lost, but when the third division was pursued after being routed by the Egyptians, Baldwin ordered a counter-attack and committed his reserve. In vicious close-quarter combat, the Crusaders repulsed the Egyptian forces, who retreated in panic as rank after rank buckled under the force of Baldwin's attack. After pursuing the fleeing Fatimids to Ascalon, Baldwin returned to Ramla to plunder the Egyptian camp. This success secured the Kingdom of Jerusalem against the Fatimid Caliphate's advances for the campaigning season. According to Fulcher, who was present at the battle, the Fatimids lost around 5,000 men in the battle, including their general Saad al-Daulah. However, Crusader losses were heavy too, losing 80 knights and a large amount of infantry.

== Aftermath ==
The battle had so nearly been a defeat for the Crusaders, and while the Fatimid survivors fled to Ascalon, the remnants of the vanguard that was crushed earlier in the battle fled to Jaffa. So great was the confusion after the battle that around 500 Fatimid troops advanced to the walls of Jaffa, where survivors of the Latin vanguard informed Baldwin's wife Arda that the king and all his men were dead. A letter was immediately sent north to Antioch to ask Tancred, regent of Antioch in the place of Bohemond of Antioch, for assistance. Jaffa did not immediately capitulate, and when Baldwin returned victorious the following day the remaining Egyptian forces quickly scattered. Ascalon remained in Fatimid hands, however, and a miscalculation would prove very costly to Baldwin when the two sides once again battled at Ramla the following year.

== Fatimid armies ==
Egyptian armies of the period relied on masses of Sudanese bowmen supported by Arab and Berber cavalry. Since the archers were on foot and the horsemen awaited attack with lance and sword, an Egyptian army provided exactly the sort of immobile target that the Frankish heavy cavalry excelled in attacking. Except for the third battle of Ramla in 1105, when Toghtekin of Damascus sent a contingent of Turks to help the Egyptians, the Fatimids did not use horse archers.

Whereas the Crusaders developed a healthy respect for the harass and surround tactics of the Turkish horse archers, they tended to discount the effectiveness of the Egyptian armies. While overconfidence led to a Crusader disaster at the second battle of Ramla, the more frequent result was a Fatimid defeat. "The Franks never, until the reign of Saladin, feared the Egyptian as they did the armies from Muslim Syria and Mesopotamia."
