= Battle of Ramla (1105) =

Battle in the Middle East

Coordinates: 31°55′29.26″N 34°52′21.75″E

Third Battle of Ramla
- Part of the Crusades
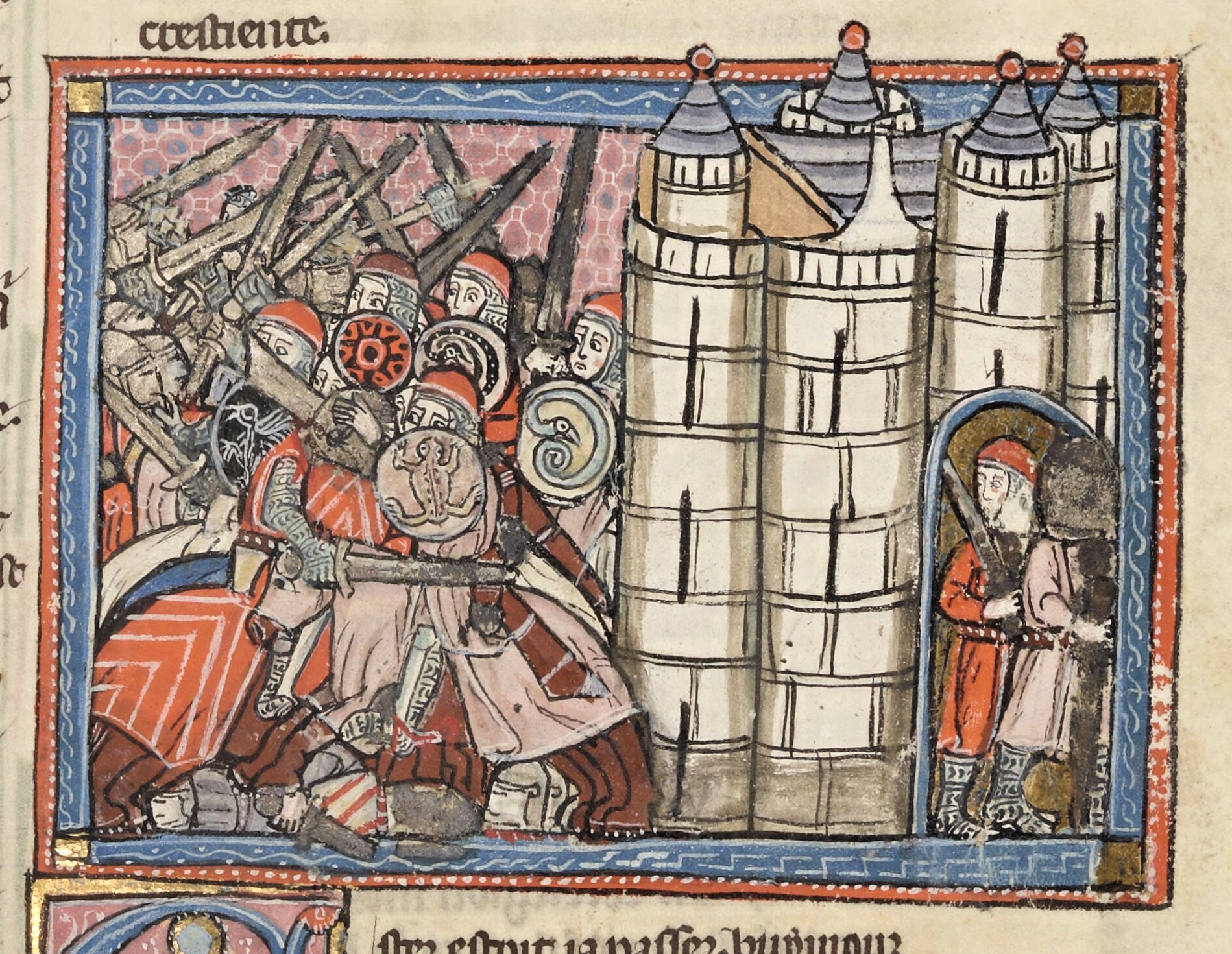
Date	27 August 1105
Location	Ramla
Result	Crusader victory

Belligerents
Kingdom of Jerusalem	Fatimid Caliphate; Burid dynasty

Commanders and leaders
Baldwin I of Jerusalem	Sama' al-Mulk Husayn; General Sabawa

Strength
2,500+ 500 knights Unknown other cavalry 2,000 infantry	6,300–16,300 (Fatimid Caliphate) 5,000–15,000 men 1,300 Turkish horse archers

Casualties and losses
60–100 killed	1,200 killed

The Third Battle of Ramla (or Ramleh) took place on 27 August 1105 between the Kingdom of Jerusalem and the Fatimids of Egypt.

== Background ==
The town of Ramla lay on the road from Jerusalem to Ascalon, the latter of which was the largest Fatimid fortress in Palestine. From Ascalon the Fatimid vizier, Al-Afdal Shahanshah, launched almost annual attacks into the newly founded Crusader kingdom from 1099 to 1107. Of the three battles the Crusaders fought at Ramla early in the 12th century, the third was the most bloody.

Egyptian armies of the period relied on masses of Sudanese bowmen supported by Arab and Berber cavalry. Since the archers were on foot and the horsemen awaited attack with lance and sword, an Egyptian army provided exactly the sort of immobile target that the Frankish heavy cavalry excelled in attacking. Whereas the Crusaders developed a healthy respect for the harass and surround tactics of the Turkish horse archers, they tended to discount the effectiveness of the Egyptian armies. While overconfidence led to a Crusader disaster at the second battle of Ramla, the more frequent result was a Fatimid defeat. "The Franks never, until the reign of Saladin, feared the Egyptian as they did the armies from Muslim Syria and Mesopotamia."

== Battle ==
At the Ramla battles in 1101 and 1102, the Crusaders had both cavalry and infantry under the leadership of King Baldwin I of Jerusalem. At the third battle, however, the Egyptians were reinforced by a Seljuk Turkish force from Damascus, including mounted archery, the great menace of the Crusaders. After they withstood the initial Frankish cavalry charge the battle raged for most of the day. Although Baldwin was once again able to drive the Egyptians from the field of battle and loot the enemy camp, he was unable to pursue them any further: "the Franks appear to have owed their victory to the activity of Baldwin. He vanquished the Turks when they were becoming a serious threat to his rear, and returned to the main battle to lead the decisive charge which defeated the Egyptians."

== Aftermath ==
Despite the victory the Egyptians continued to make annual raids into the Kingdom of Jerusalem with some reaching the walls of the city of Jerusalem before being pushed back. The next major engagement between Fatimids and Crusaders was the Battle of Yibneh in 1123.
