= Battle of Acre =

Battle of Acre may refer to:

- The Siege of Acre (1189–1191)
- The Battle of Acre (1258) between the Genoese and Venetians
- The Siege of Acre (1291) by the Mamluks
- The Siege of Acre (1799) by Napoleon
- The Battle of Acre (1840)

== See also ==
- Siege of Acre (disambiguation)
