= Mosque of the Elephant =

Former mosque in Cairo

- الجامع الفيلة

Religion
- Affiliation: Islam (former)
- Ecclesiastical or organisational status: Mosque (12th–14th centuries)
- Status: Destroyed

Location
- Location: Fustat, Old Cairo
- Country: Egypt

Architecture
- Type: Mosque
- Style: Fatimid
- Founder: al-Afdal Shahanshah
- Completed: 1105 CE
- Construction cost: 6,000 gold dinars
- Demolished: after the 14th century

The Mosque of the Elephant (Arabic: الجامع الفيلة, romanized: Jami al-Fila) was a small mosque built in 1105 CE by the vizier, and de facto ruler of the Fatimid Caliphate, al-Afdal Shahanshah, on the southern outskirts of Cairo. By the 14th-century, the mosque was used for profane purposes.

== Overview ==
The building, the only known mosque to have been built under al-Afdal's regency (1094–1021), was located south of Fustat (Old Cairo), on a hill above the so-called Lake of the Abyssinians (Birkat al-Habash). It was built at a cost of 6,000 gold dinars and inaugurated in April/May 1105. Its name derived from a row of seven domed tombs in the vicinity, which from the distance is supposed to have looked like armed warriors riding on an elephant.

In 1119, work began to install a new observatory at the mosque, in order to revise the astronomical tables (zij) used at the time in Egypt, that were hopelessly out of date. The affair turned into a fiasco: costs skyrocketed, especially for the large, and difficult to cast, bronze rings used for observations. Even when the latter were successfully cast and installed on the roof of the mosque, it turned out that the Muqattam Hills actually blocked the view of the sun during sunrise; the whole apparatus had to be transported to a new site on the Muqattam itself.

The mosque was already ruined by the 14th century, when the Bedouin are recorded as watering their camels in its cistern.

== See also ==
- Islam in Egypt
- List of mosques in Egypt
