= Thoros of Edessa =

Armenian ruler of Edessa from 1094 to 1098

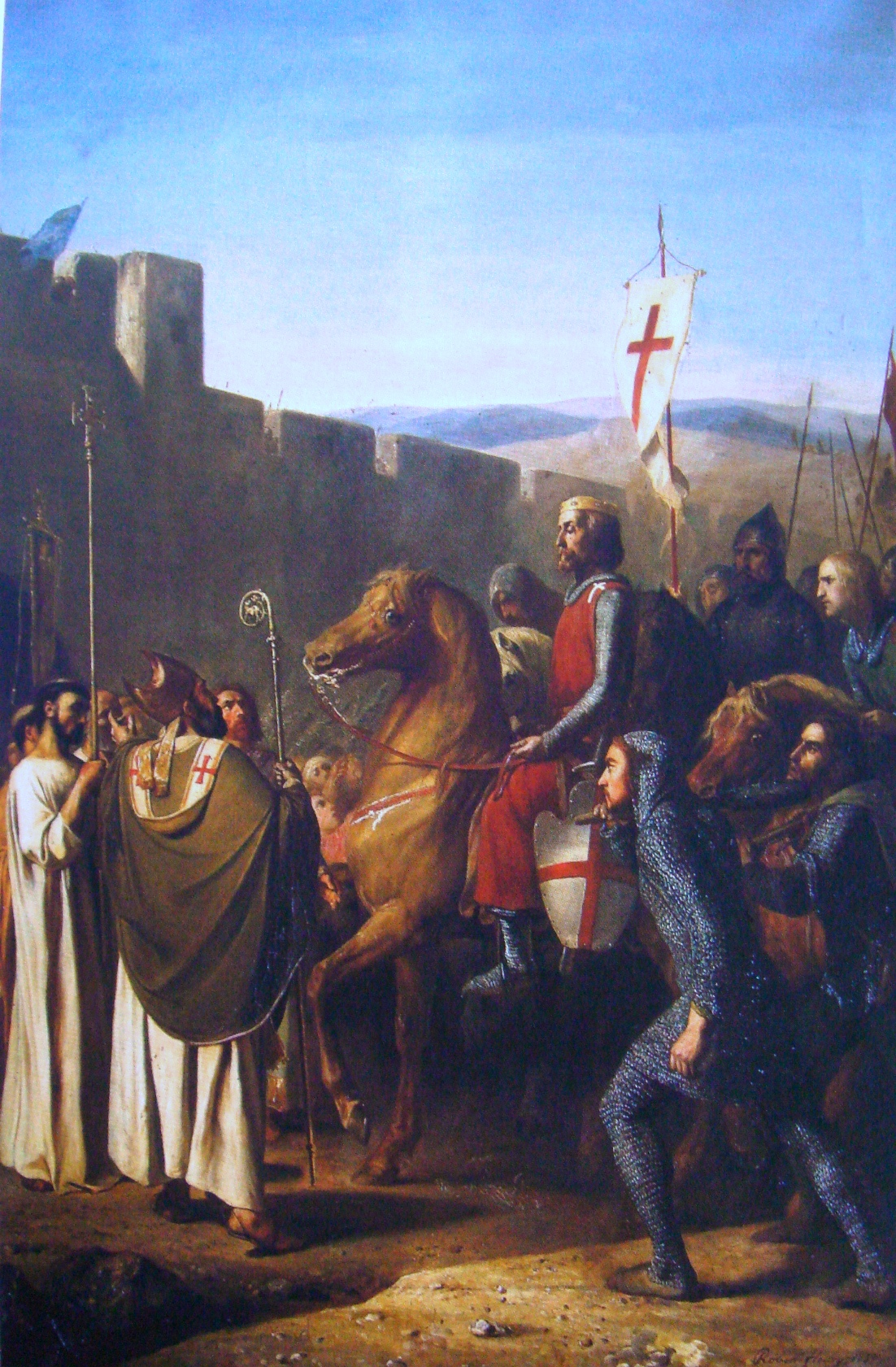
Baldwin of Boulogne entering Edessa in February 1098. He is shown being welcomed by the Armenian clergy, who welcomed the end of tutelage to Constantinople.

Thoros (short in Armenian for Theodoros; Թորոս կուրապաղատ, T'oros the Curopalates; d. March 9, 1098) was an Armenian ruler of Edessa at the time of the First Crusade. Thoros was a former officer (curopalates) in the Byzantine Empire and a lieutenant of Philaretos Brachamios. He was Armenian but practiced the Greek Orthodox faith.

The Chronicle of Matthew of Edessa records that "Thoros son of Hethum" was installed as governor of Edessa by Tutush, who had defeated and killed emir Bouzan in the year 543 of the Armenia era (26 Feb. 1094 – 25 Feb. 1095). According to Sturdza, Hethum [I] was descended from the Pahlavouni, an important family in Caucasian Armenia. He conquered land to the east of that conquered by his fellow Armenian Rupen. Steven Runciman calls Thoros the "son-in-law" of Gabriel of Melitene.

Around 1094, the Seljuk emir of Damascus, Tutush I, captured Edessa and established Thoros as governor. Thoros immediately tried to take control of the city for himself. Thoros then fortified Edessa and cut off the citadel, garrisoned by Turkish and Armenian troops. The Turks and Ortoqids besieged the city for two months, but were unable to capture it even after breaking through the walls. The Turks withdrew and Thoros was recognized as lord of the city.

As a Greek Orthodox Christian, he was not well loved by his Armenian subjects in Edessa. He resisted attacks from the Seljuks, but in 1098 had to ask for help from the crusaders, who were occupied at the siege of Antioch.

Edessa.

Baldwin of Boulogne had come to Edessa rather than participate in the siege, probably looking to carve out some territory for himself, and had captured Turbessel. Thoros invited him to Edessa and made an alliance with him in February 1098. Baldwin gradually convinced Thoros to adopt him as his son and heir, but having done this, Baldwin attacked Thoros' officers and besieged him in the citadel. Thoros agreed to let him have the city and made plans to flee with his family to Melitene, but shortly afterwards, on March 9, Thoros was assassinated by the Armenian inhabitants of the city, possibly at Baldwin's command, and Baldwin became the first count of Edessa.
