= Battle of Jaffa (1256) =

1256 battle of the Crusades

- Part of Crusades and Fall of Outremer
| Date | 17 March 1256 |
| Location | Jaffa |
| Result | Crusader victory |

Belligerents
| Kingdom of Jerusalem; Kingdom of France; Knights Hospitaller | Mamluk Sultanate |

Commanders and leaders
| John of Ibelin; Geoffrey of Sargines | Emir of Jerusalem †; Emir of Bethelehm † |

Strength
| 200 knights 300 sergeants, archers & crossbows | Unknown |

Casualties and losses
| 21 killed | 2,000 killed |

The Battle of Jaffa was a military engagement between the Crusaders and the Mamluks outside of Jaffa. The Mamluks raided the outskirts of Jaffa, but the Crusader sortie inflicted a severe defeat on the Mamluks and routed them.

== Background ==
By September, the High Court in Acre appointed a new regent, Count John of Jaffa. He served for two years, until other responsibilities demanded his attention, at which point in 1256 he was succeeded by Count John of Arsuf. To prevent the decline of peace, the bailli and the kingdom's noble lords arranged a new truce with the Muslims, encompassing both primary sultans, which was signed in February 1255. Through this agreement, the Muslims consented to acknowledge Crusader territory west of the Jordan River extending to Arsur, but Jaffa was specifically omitted. To safeguard Jaffa, Geoffrey of Sergines consequently positioned his troops there in December.

Geoffrey and John, taking advantage of the tension that had once again arisen between the Mamluks of Egypt and the Ayyubids of Damascus, launching from there, on January 5, 1256, a raid across the Mamluk frontier march of Ascalon-Gaza; the raid was a complete success, since he brought back to Jaffa 1,000 camels or other head of large livestock and 10,000 head of small livestock. The Mamluk government of Cairo charged the emir of Jerusalem with carrying out reprisals. The emir came to blockade Jaffa, ravaged the region, and returned home with about a hundred prisoners, Templars, Hospitallers, or sergeants, and 40,000 head of cattle.

== Battle ==
On March 17th of the same year, the Mamluk emir once again raided Jaffa. They began raiding the outskirts. Once the Mamluks were near Jaffa's walls, the Crusaders under Geoffrey and John launched a sortie against the Muslims. Despite only having a force of 200 knights and 300 sergeants and crossbowmen, the Crusaders managed to inflict a severe defeat on the Mamluks, killing 2,000 men, including the emirs of Jerusalem and Bethlehm. During the battle, John fell from his horse, which was captured by the Mamluks. However, he was saved by knights Hospitallers. The Crusaders chased the Mamluks but stopped due to fear of ambush. Crusader casualties were 20 sergeants and one knight killed.

== Aftermath ==
After this victory, Geoffrey induced the Sultans of Cairo and Damascus to agree to truce renewal for ten years, ten months and 10 days, which they accepted. However, in the same year, the Crusaders would enter a conflict called the War of Saint Sabas.

== Sources ==
- Jaroslav Folda (2005), Crusader art in the Holy Land: from the Third Crusade to the fall of Acre, 1187-1291.
- Janet Shirley (2016), Crusader Syria in the Thirteenth Century. The Rothelin Continuation of the History of William of Tyre with Part of the Eracles Or Acre Text.
- René Grousset (1934), The History of the Crusades and the Frankish Kingdom of Jerusalem, Vol III. The Muslim Monarchy and Frankish Anarchy.
