= Sama' al-Mulk Husayn =

Son of the Fatimid vizier and quasi-sultan, al-Afdal Shahanshah

Sharaf al-Ma'ali Sama' al-Mulk al-Husayn ibn al-Afdal was a son of the Fatimid vizier and quasi-sultan, al-Afdal Shahanshah.

Husayn commanded the Fatimid army in the Second (1102) and Third (1105) Battles of Ramla against the Crusaders of the Kingdom of Jerusalem, although some confusion exists since different titles are given by the chronicles for each: Sharaf al-Ma'ali for 1102, and Sama' al-Mulk for 1105, leading to the mistaken assumption by some medieval and modern historians that different sons of al-Afdal were involved in each. In 1115, the increasingly ill and feeble al-Afdal appointed him as his deputy and heir-presumptive. However, after a failed assassination attempt in 1118, al-Afdal suspected his sons of being responsible for it, and withdrew all privileges, income, and personnel assigned to his sons, thus ending the prospect of a dynastic succession. After al-Afdal's assassination in December 1121, his adult sons were confined in the caliphal palace to prevent them from rallying their followers and seize power; instead, Caliph al-Amir, with the assistance of al-Afdal's chief of staff, and now successor as vizier, al-Ma'mun al-Bata'ihi, took control of the government. Husayn's fate after that is unknown, but he was likely killed, along with most of his brothers, by the new vizier.

== Bibliography ==
- Brett, Michael (2017). The Fatimid Empire. The Edinburgh History of the Islamic Empires. Edinburgh: Edinburgh University Press. ISBN 978-0-7486-4076-8.
- Brett, Michael (2019). "The battles of Ramla, 1099–1105". The Fatimids and Egypt. London and New York: Taylor & Francis. pp. 207–228. ISBN 978-1-138-35482-1.
- Halm, Heinz (2014). Kalifen und Assassinen: Ägypten und der vordere Orient zur Zeit der ersten Kreuzzüge, 1074–1171 [Caliphs and Assassins: Egypt and the Near East at the Time of the First Crusades, 1074–1171] (in German). Munich: C. H. Beck. doi:10.17104/9783406661648-1. ISBN 978-3-406-66163-1. OCLC 870587158.
