= Siege of Acre (1103) =

1103 battle of the Crusaders

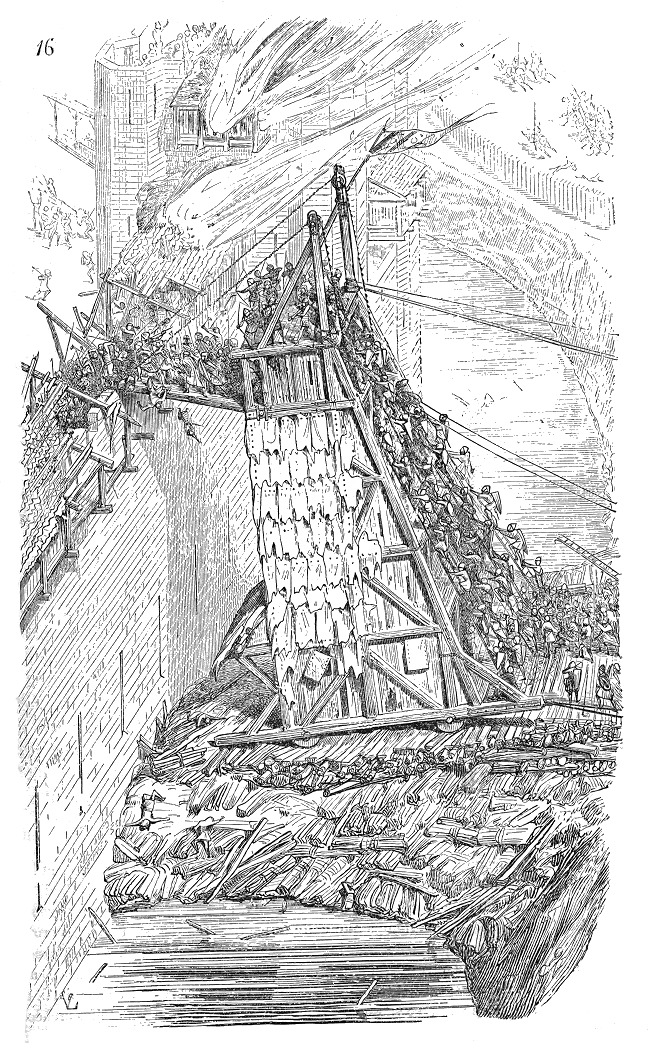
- A siege tower in action; French depiction of the 19th century
Date	Spring, 1103
Location	Acre, Fatimid Caliphate 32°55′40″N 35°04′54″E
Result	Fatimid victory

Belligerents
Kingdom of Jerusalem	Fatimid Caliphate Turkomans: Tyre; Sidon

Commanders and leaders
Baldwin I	al-Amir bi-Ahkam Allah

Strength
5,000 men	Unknown

Casualties and losses
Unknown	

The siege of Acre took place from 6 April to 16 May 1103 by Crusader forces against the Fatimid coastal city of Acre.

== Background ==
Having seized much of the coastal cities following the First Crusade, King Baldwin I of Jerusalem's next target of conquest was Acre. In the spring of 1103, he began the siege of the city, which sits on a promontory on the northern edge of Haifa Bay. He was assisted by the remaining crews and passengers of the pilgrim fleet whose appearance had contributed decisively to the victory at the Battle of Jaffa the previous year. Arab historian Ibn al-Athir reports on a naval blockade of Acre. However, the number of ships available on the Crusader side was apparently not sufficient for a complete blockade, as subsequent events also showed. Also in the history of William of Tyre, the lack of ships was seen as decisive for the failure of the siege.

== Siege ==
The besiegers, said to have numbered about 5,000 men, deployed catapults and a siege tower, which after some prolonged fighting prompted the defenders to begin negotiations on the terms of the surrender. But shortly before the surrender of Acre, 12 Muslim galleys coming from Tyre and Sidon and a large transport ship with men and war materiel entered the city's harbor, in which these reinforcements revived the will to fight. The defenders defeated several of the siege engines and damaged the Crusader siege tower. Baldwin then decided to break off the siege. The remaining siege engines were destroyed by the retreating Crusaders, and much of the orchards of Acre as well.

== Aftermath ==
After the failure at Acre, Baldwin made another advance into Mount Carmel to clear it of the gangs of bandits who were still making the traffic routes around Haifa unsafe from there. However, he was wounded in a skirmish, and the endeavor was ended prematurely.
