= Baldwin I of Jerusalem =

King of Jerusalem from 1100 to 1118

Baldwin I
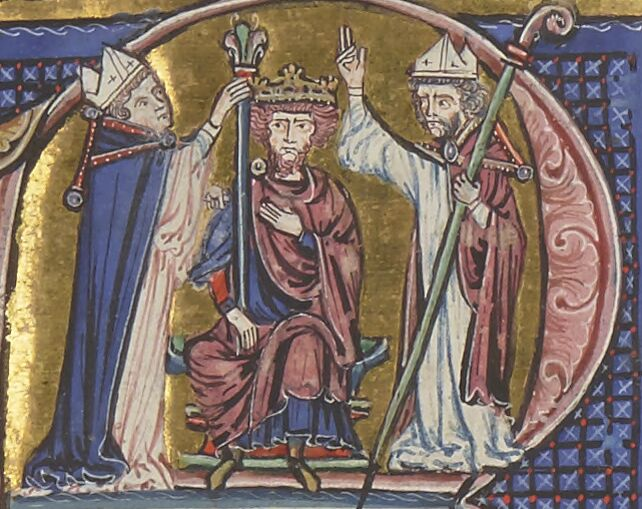
- Baldwin's coronation, as illustrated in a 13th-century text (Bibliothèque nationale de France)

King of Jerusalem
- Reign: 1100–1118
- Coronation: 25 December 1100
- Predecessor: Godfrey of Bouillon (as Advocate of the Holy Sepulchre)
- Successor: Baldwin II

Count of Edessa
- Reign: 1098–1100
- Successor: Baldwin II
- Born: after 1060
- Died: 2 April 1118; Al-Arish, Fatimid Caliphate
- Burial: Church of the Holy Sepulchre, Jerusalem
- Spouses: Godehilde of Tosny; Arda; Adelaide del Vasto
- House: House of Flanders
- Father: Eustace II of Boulogne
- Mother: Ida of Lorraine

Baldwin I (1060s – 2 April 1118) was the first count of Edessa from 1098 to 1100 and king of Jerusalem from 1100 to his death in 1118. He was the youngest son of Count Eustace II of Boulogne and Ida of Lorraine and married a Norman noblewoman, Godehilde of Tosny. He received the County of Verdun in 1096, but he soon joined the crusader army of his brother Godfrey of Bouillon and became one of the most successful commanders of the First Crusade.

While the main crusader army was marching across Asia Minor in 1097, Baldwin and the Norman Tancred launched a separate expedition against Cilicia. Tancred tried to capture Tarsus in September, but Baldwin forced him to leave it, which gave rise to an enduring conflict between them. Baldwin seized important fortresses in the lands to the west of the Euphrates with the assistance of local Armenians. Thoros of Edessa invited him to come to Edessa to fight against the Seljuks. Taking advantage of a riot against Thoros, Baldwin seized the town and established the first Crusader state on 10 March 1098. To strengthen his rule, the widowed Baldwin married an Armenian ruler's daughter (who is now known as Arda). He supplied the main crusader army with food during the siege of Antioch. He defended Edessa against Kerbogha, the governor of Mosul, for three weeks, preventing him from reaching Antioch before the crusaders captured it.

The crusaders elected Godfrey of Bouillon as the ruler of Jerusalem, but he died the following year. Tancred sought assistance from his uncle, Bohemond I of Antioch, to prevent Baldwin from becoming Jerusalem's new ruler, but Godfrey's retainers took possession of the town and urged Baldwin to claim Godfrey's inheritance. Since a Muslim ruler had captured Bohemond, Baldwin marched to Jerusalem, meeting little resistance. The patriarch crowned him king in Bethlehem on 25 December. He captured Arsuf and Caesarea in 1101, Acre in 1104, Beirut in 1110, and Sidon in 1111, with the assistance of Genoese and Venetian fleets and of several smaller crusader groups, but all his attempts to capture Ascalon and Tyre failed. After his victory at the third battle of Ramla in 1105, the Egyptians launched no further major campaigns against the Kingdom of Jerusalem.

Baldwin helped Count Bertrand of Toulouse to capture Tripoli in 1109. Being the only crowned monarch in the Latin East, Baldwin claimed suzerainty over other crusader rulers. Baldwin II of Edessa and Bertrand swore fealty to him. Tancred, who ruled the Principality of Antioch, also obeyed his summons. Baldwin supported Baldwin II and Tancred against Kerbogha's successor, Mawdud, who launched a series of campaigns against Edessa and Antioch in the early 1110s. He erected fortresses in Oultrejordain—the territory to the east of the Jordan River—to control the caravan routes between Syria and Egypt. He died during a campaign against Egypt in 1118.

== Early life ==
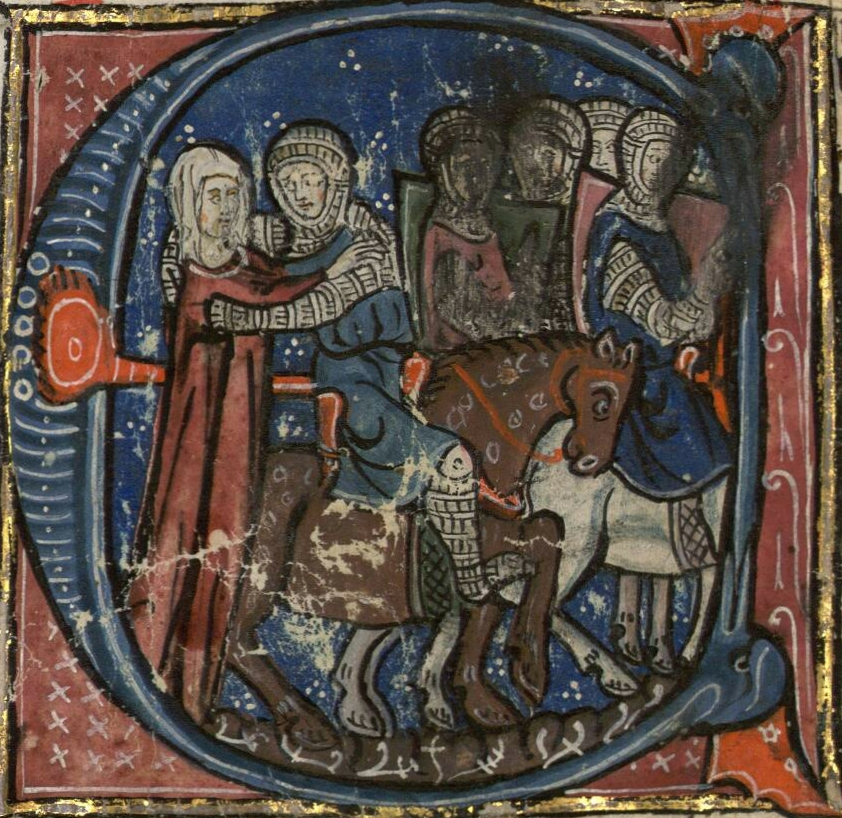
A 13th century illustration of Countess Ida bidding farewell to her sons as they depart for the First Crusade

Born some time after 1060, Baldwin was the third son of Count Eustace II of Boulogne and Ida of Lorraine. Being his parents' youngest son, he was intended for a career in the Church. He studied the liberal arts and held prebends in the cathedrals of Cambrai, Rheims and Liège. For reasons that are unknown, and at an unspecified time, he abandoned his church career and became a knight. The historian John France says that Baldwin most probably realised that the Gregorian Reform had diminished his chance to seize rich benefices. Historian Susan B. Edgington, on the other hand, proposes that Baldwin preferred a secular career because his childless brother, Godfrey of Bouillon, duke of Lower Lotharingia, had taken ill suddenly, giving Baldwin a chance to inherit his duchy.

Baldwin married a Norman noblewoman, Godehilde of Tosny, whose family owned land and property in both Normandy and England. Baldwin and his wife most probably settled in the court of his eldest brother, Count Eustace III of Boulogne. Eustace and Baldwin jointly fought for their brother, Godfrey, against Count Albert III of Namur and Bishop Theoderic of Verdun at Stenay in 1086. Godfrey mentioned Baldwin in most of his charters of grant, indicating that Baldwin was regarded as his designated heir. Baldwin regularly visited the fortress of his wife's family at Conches-en-Ouche.

== First Crusade ==
Pope Urban II proclaimed the First Crusade at the Council of Clermont on 27 November 1095. Godfrey of Bouillon decided to join the military campaign and sold or mortgaged his inherited domains to raise funds. One of his domains, the County of Verdun, was seized by the bishop of Verdun, Richer, who soon granted it to Baldwin. The dissolution of Godfrey's allodial lands deprived all future dukes of the basis of their authority in Lower Lotharingia, which facilitated Baldwin's decision to take the Cross. Eustace III of Boulogne also joined the crusade. According to a letter from Pope Urban, only the army that Peter the Hermit had mustered for the People's Crusade outnumbered the three brothers' force.

Baldwin departed for the crusade with Godfrey's army on 15 August 1096. His wife and children accompanied him, suggesting that he had decided not to return to his homeland. The crusaders stopped at Tulln an der Donau before reaching the frontier of Hungary in September. Godfrey left Baldwin in charge of his troops during his conference with King Coloman of Hungary, to discuss the conditions of the crusaders' march across the country. He agreed to hand over Baldwin, along with Baldwin's wife and retainers, as hostages, to ensure their troops' good conduct. Baldwin and Godehilde were released soon after the crusaders left Hungary. They entered the Byzantine Empire near Belgrade in late November.

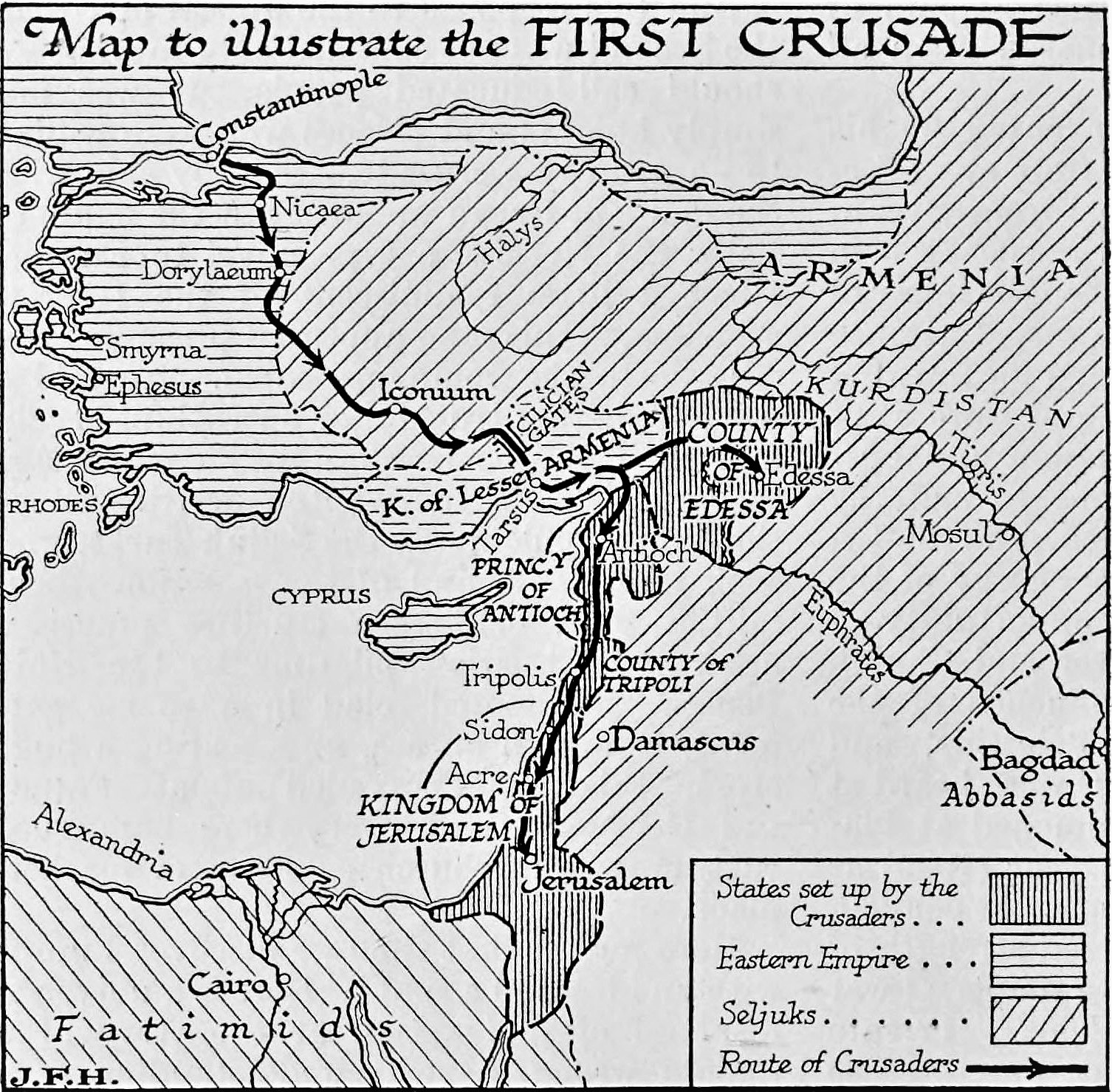
The crusaders' route in Asia Minor, Syria and Palestine (from H. G. Wells' The Outline of History)

The crusaders reached Constantinople on 23 December 1096. The Byzantine emperor Alexios I Komnenos demanded an oath of allegiance from their leaders and imposed a blockade on their camp to enforce it. Baldwin made raids against the districts outside the walls of Constantinople, compelling Alexios to lift the blockade. The Emperor also agreed to hand over his son and heir, John II Comnenus, as a hostage, who was entrusted to Baldwin's care.

Since the crusaders continued to resist the emperor's demand, the Byzantines reduced the fodder and food supplied to them. Baldwin again attacked the suburbs and killed or captured dozens of Pecheneg guards. The crusaders realised that they could not defeat the imperial army and so yielded to the emperor's demand. Their commanders (including Godfrey and Baldwin) swore fealty to Alexios and pledged that they would cede all conquered lands that the Seljuk Turks had seized from the Byzantines to the emperor's representatives. The crusaders were transferred to a camp established on the road between Chalcedon and Nicomedia in Asia Minor, but Godfrey and Baldwin soon returned to Constantinople to be present when the commanders of a new crusader army did homage to Alexios. When a knight sat on the emperor's throne during the ceremony, Baldwin "took him by the hand and made him rise" and severely reprimanded him.

After the crusaders defeated Kilij Arslan, the Seljuk sultan of Rûm, in the Battle of Dorylaeum on 1 July 1097, Baldwin and the Italo-Norman leader Tancred broke away from the main body of the army. They marched as far as Heraclea, where they again joined their fellows around 15 August. The crusaders became exhausted during their long march across Asia Minor and most of their horses died. To secure a supply of food and forage, Baldwin and Tancred were sent to the fertile plains of Cilicia. There they could count on the support of the local Armenians, especially as Baldwin had already been befriended by an Armenian nobleman, Bagrat Pakrad.

Baldwin and Tancred led two separate contingents. Tancred was the first to leave Heraclea, accompanied by 100–200 troops; Baldwin and his 300 knights departed around 15 September. Tancred arrived at Tarsus—an important center of commerce in Cilicia—on 21 September. He persuaded the Seljuk garrison of Tarsus to raise his flag on the citadel, even before his troops were granted access to the town. Baldwin reached Tarsus on the following day. The Turks replaced Tancred's banner with Baldwin's flag and allowed Baldwin to take possession of two towers. Heavily outnumbered by Baldwin's troops, Tancred decided not to fight for the town and rode off. Shortly thereafter, about 300 Norman knights arrived, but Baldwin denied entry to them, which enabled the Turks to attack and murder the Normans during the night. Baldwin's own men blamed him for their fate and massacred the remnants of the Seljuk garrison. Fearful of vengeance, Baldwin took shelter in a tower, but finally convinced his soldiers of his innocence. A pirate captain, Guynemer of Boulogne, sailed up the Berdan River to Tarsus and swore fealty to Baldwin. He hired Guynemer's men to garrison Tarsus and continued his campaign.

Tancred had meanwhile seized the prosperous town of Mamistra. Baldwin reached the town on around 30 September. One of the most prominent Italian Norman crusaders, Richard of Salerno, wanted to take revenge for the Normans who had perished at Tarsus, which caused a skirmish between the soldiers of Baldwin and Tancred. This was the first occasion when crusaders fought against each other. After one or two men were killed and many more were injured or captured on both sides, Baldwin and Tancred made peace and Baldwin left Mamistra. He joined the main army at Marash, but Bagrat persuaded him to launch a campaign towards the River Euphrates across a region densely populated by Armenians. About 80–100 knights accompanied him when he again left the main army on 17 October.

== Count of Edessa ==
=== Establishment ===
The Armenians regarded Baldwin as a liberator. Two Armenian chiefs, Fer and Nicusus, joined him soon after he started his campaign. The local population massacred the Seljuk garrisons and officials, or forced them to flee. The Seljuks' fear of the crusaders contributed to Baldwin's success. He seized two important fortresses, Ravendel and Turbessel, without a fight before the end of 1097. He made Bagrat the governor of Ravendel, and appointed Fer to administer Turbessel.

The Armenian lord of Edessa, Thoros, sent envoys—the Armenian bishop of Edessa and twelve leading citizens—to Baldwin in early 1098, seeking his assistance against the nearby Seljuk rulers. Being the first town to convert to Christianity, Edessa had played an important role in Christian history. Before departing for Edessa, Baldwin ordered the arrest of Bagrat, whom Fer had accused of secret correspondence with the Seljuks. Bagrat was tortured and forced to surrender Ravendel. Baldwin left for Edessa in early February, but troops sent by Balduk, the emir of Samosata, or Bagrat prevented him from crossing the Euphrates. His second attempt was successful and he reached Edessa on 20 February. Baldwin did not want to serve Thoros as a mercenary. The Armenian townspeople feared that he was planning to leave the town, so they persuaded Thoros to adopt him. Alone among the contemporary historians of the First Crusade, Albert of Aix claims that the local customs of adoption required Thoros to take Baldwin under his shirt. Strengthened by troops from Edessa, Baldwin raided Balduk's territory and placed a garrison in a small fortress near Samosata.

In the view of the twelve governors' and all their fellow citizens' steadfastness and goodwill towards Baldwin, [Thoros of Edessa] had to grant their request whether he liked it or not, and he made Baldwin his own adopted son according to the custom of that region and people, binding him to his naked chest and clothing him once for all under the garment closest to his own flesh, with pledges given and received by both parties. With the father-and-son relationship thus confirmed on both sides, [Thoros] one day suggested to Baldwin, in his position as son, that he call his men together, all the army and those serving for pay, taking the citizens of Edessa likewise, and set out for the fortification at Samosata which was next to the Euphrates and conquer Balduk, prince of the Turks, who had unjustly seized that same citadel, which belonged to Edessa, and was holding it.

— Albert of Aix: History of the Journey to Jerusalem

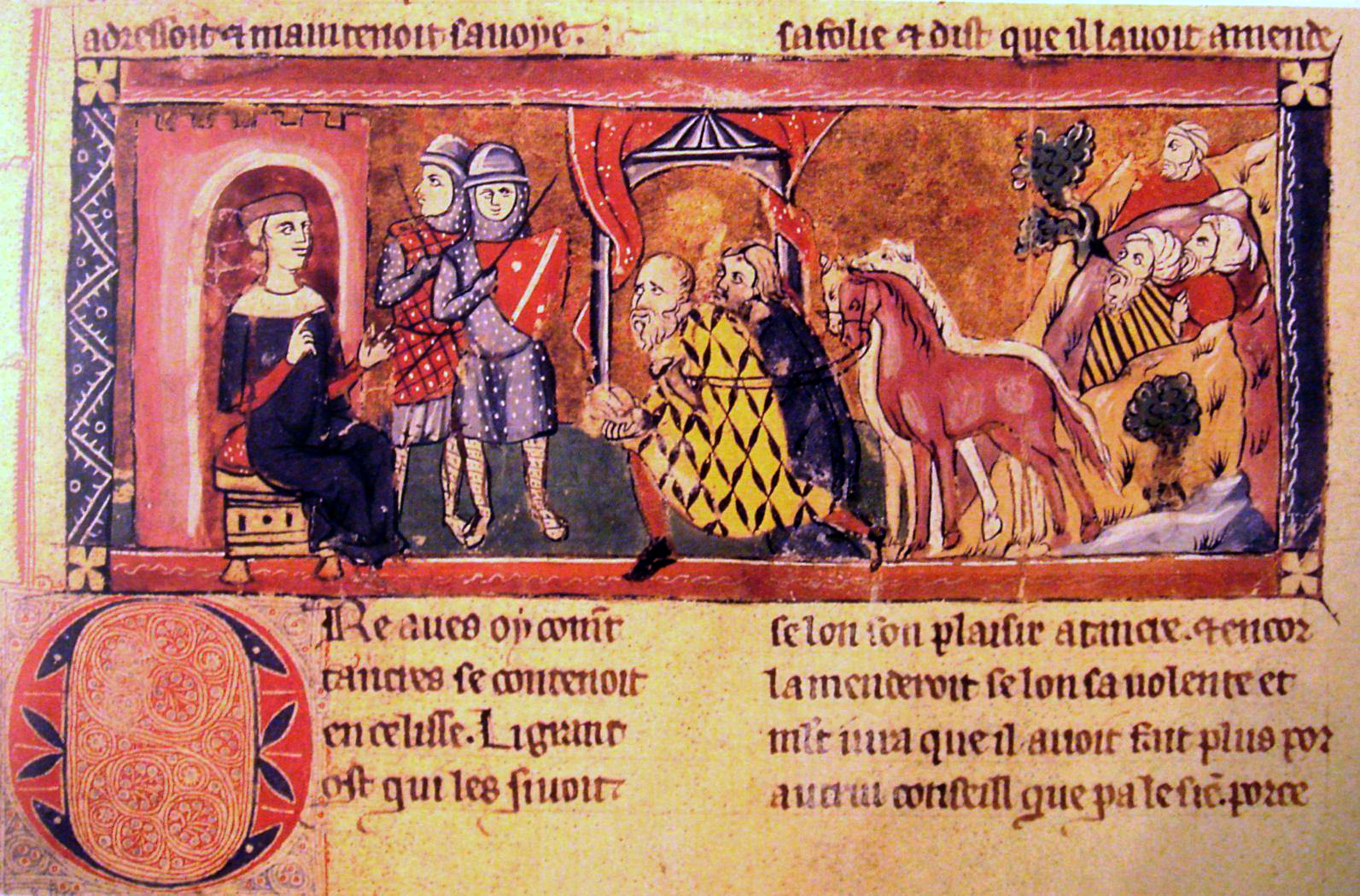
Baldwin receiving the homage of the Armenians in Edessa

Unlike the majority of the Armenians, Thoros adhered to the Orthodox Church, which made him unpopular among his Miaphysite subjects. Shortly after Baldwin's return from campaign, the local nobles started plotting against Thoros, possibly with Baldwin's consent (as is stated by contemporary chronicler Matthew of Edessa). According to Albert of Aachen, Constantine of Gargar, one of the conspirators, suggested to replace Thoros with Baldwin. A riot broke out in the town, forcing Thoros to take refuge in the citadel. Baldwin pledged to save his adoptive father, but when the rioters broke into the citadel on 9 March and murdered both Thoros and his wife, he did nothing to help them. On the following day, after the townspeople acknowledged Baldwin as their ruler (or doux), he assumed the title of Count of Edessa, and so established the first Crusader state.

The Seljuks had captured Edessa from the Byzantines in 1087, but Alexios did not demand that Baldwin hand over the town. Historian Christopher MacEvitt argues that the local population did not regard Baldwin's ascension as "a change in regime, but the replacement of one strongman with vague Byzantine ties with another of the same ilk". The acquisition of Ravendel, Turbessel and Edessa strengthened the position of the main crusader army during the siege of Antioch, which was taking place at the same time. The fertile lands along the Euphrates secured a supply of food for the crusaders. The three fortresses also hindered the movement of the Seljuk troops towards Syria and Palestine.

=== Consolidation ===
Baldwin had to use his diplomatic skills to secure his rule in Edessa, because his retinue was small. He married the daughter of an Armenian lord named Taftoc (possibly the brother of Constantine of Gargar), according to William of Tyre, and encouraged his retainers to marry local women. Thoros' rich treasury enabled him to employ mercenaries and to buy Samosata from Balduk. Baldwin and Balduk's treaty about the transfer of Samosata was the first friendly arrangement between a crusader leader and a Muslim ruler. Balduk settled in Edessa.

An Artuqid emir, Belek Ghazi, hired Baldwin to suppress a revolt in Saruj. When the Muslim burghers of the town approached Balduk to come to their rescue, Balduk hurried to Saruj, but it soon became apparent that his retinue was too small to resist a siege and both he and the townspeople yielded to Baldwin. Baldwin demanded Balduk's wife and children as hostages, but Balduk refused to hand them over to him, for which Baldwin had him captured and executed.

The expansion of the County of Edessa from 1098 to 1131 (the territory conquered by Baldwin is depicted with the darkest color)

Baldwin granted the usufruct of Turbessel and Ravendel to his brother Godfrey, to secure his and his retainers' accommodation during the siege of Antioch. The continued support that Baldwin provided his brother with increased his brother's standing within the crusade army, proving crucial during the crusade as food was many times scarce. Kerbogha, the governor of Mosul, gathered a large army to relieve the town. During his march towards Antioch, Kerbogha did not wish to risk allowing the crusaders to hold Edessa. He besieged Edessa for three weeks in May, but could not capture it. His delay enabled the crusaders to capture Antioch on 3 June 1098. Antioch became the capital of a new Crusader state, the Principality of Antioch, with Tancred's uncle, Bohemond of Taranto, as its first prince.

Baldwin levied high taxes, which made him unpopular among his native subjects. He also ignored the local nobles' advice and granted property to his retainers and other crusaders who moved to Edessa. A dozen Armenian chiefs plotted against Baldwin in December, and approached the nearby Seljuk emirs for assistance, but Baldwin learnt of the conspiracy and ordered the arrest of the conspirators. The two ringleaders were mutilated in accordance with Byzantine laws, but the others were allowed to redeem themselves for large fees. Nevertheless, Baldwin continued to appoint Armenian noblemen to important offices. He made the Armenian Ablgharib the commander of Bijerik, an important fort controlling the road between Edessa and Turbessel.

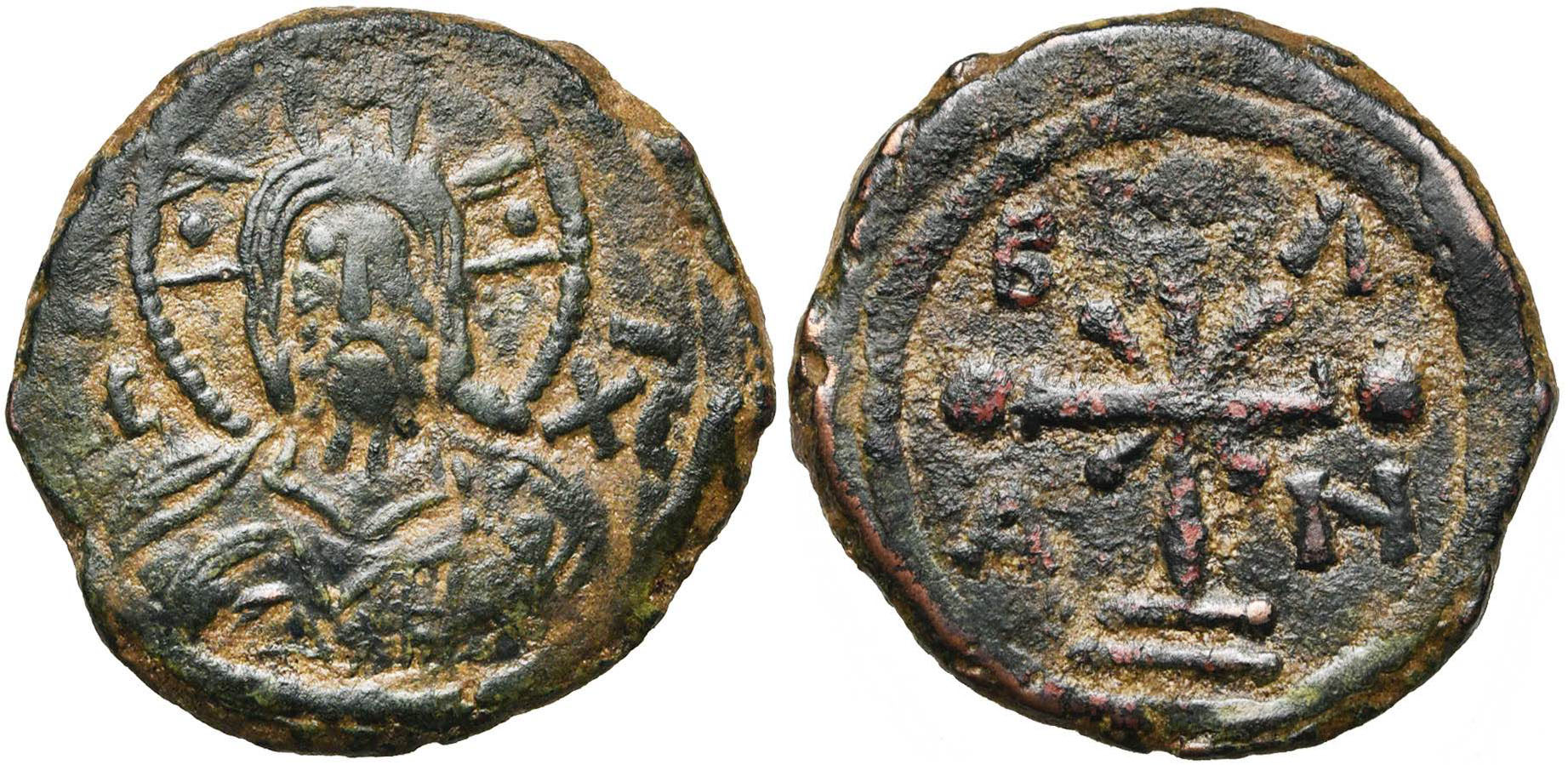
Silver denier of Baldwin as Count of Edessa

The main crusader army captured Jerusalem on 15 July 1099. A week later, Godfrey of Bouillon was elected ruler of the city, but chose not to be crowned king. Baldwin decided to complete his pilgrimage and left Edessa for Jerusalem in November. At Buluniyas, he joined the pilgrims who had departed Antioch with Bohemond I and the papal legate, Daimbert of Pisa. Attacks by Muslim troops, fatigue and diseases caused heavy casualties during the journey, but most of the pilgrims reached Jerusalem on 21 December. Four days later, Daimbert was elected and installed as the new Latin Patriarch of Jerusalem. The new patriarch confirmed Godfrey and Bohemond in the possession of their lands, but no similar ceremony was recorded in connection with Baldwin. Baldwin and Bohemond left Jerusalem on 1 January 1100. Duqaq, the Seljuk ruler of Damascus, sent forces to attack them, but the crusaders routed the Seljuk troops near Baalbek. Baldwin arrived back in Edessa in February.

Godfrey died unexpectedly on 18 July 1100. He had extracted oaths from Daimbert and other leading crusaders that they "would not confer the throne on anyone except his brothers or one of his blood", according to Albert of Aix. Warner of Grez, Godfrey's most influential retainer, took possession of the Tower of David in Jerusalem to secure control of the city. Although Warner soon died, two other members of Godfrey's court, Geldemar Carpenel and Arnulf of Chocques, sent a delegation to Baldwin, urging him to come to Jerusalem.

To prevent Baldwin from seizing Godfrey's realm, Daimbert and Tancred sought assistance from Bohemond I of Antioch. Daimbert sent a letter to him, stating that Baldwin's rule would "bring about the downfall of the church and the destruction of Christianity itself", according to later chronicler William of Tyre. Bohemond, however, was captured by the Danishmend Gazi Gümüshtigin in the hills near Melitene around 15 August. Baldwin hurried to Melitene and pursued the Danishmend for three days, but he was unable to rescue Bohemond. After his return, the Armenian lord of Melitene, Gabriel, swore fealty to him. Baldwin appointed fifty knights to defend the town.

== King of Jerusalem ==
=== Coronation ===
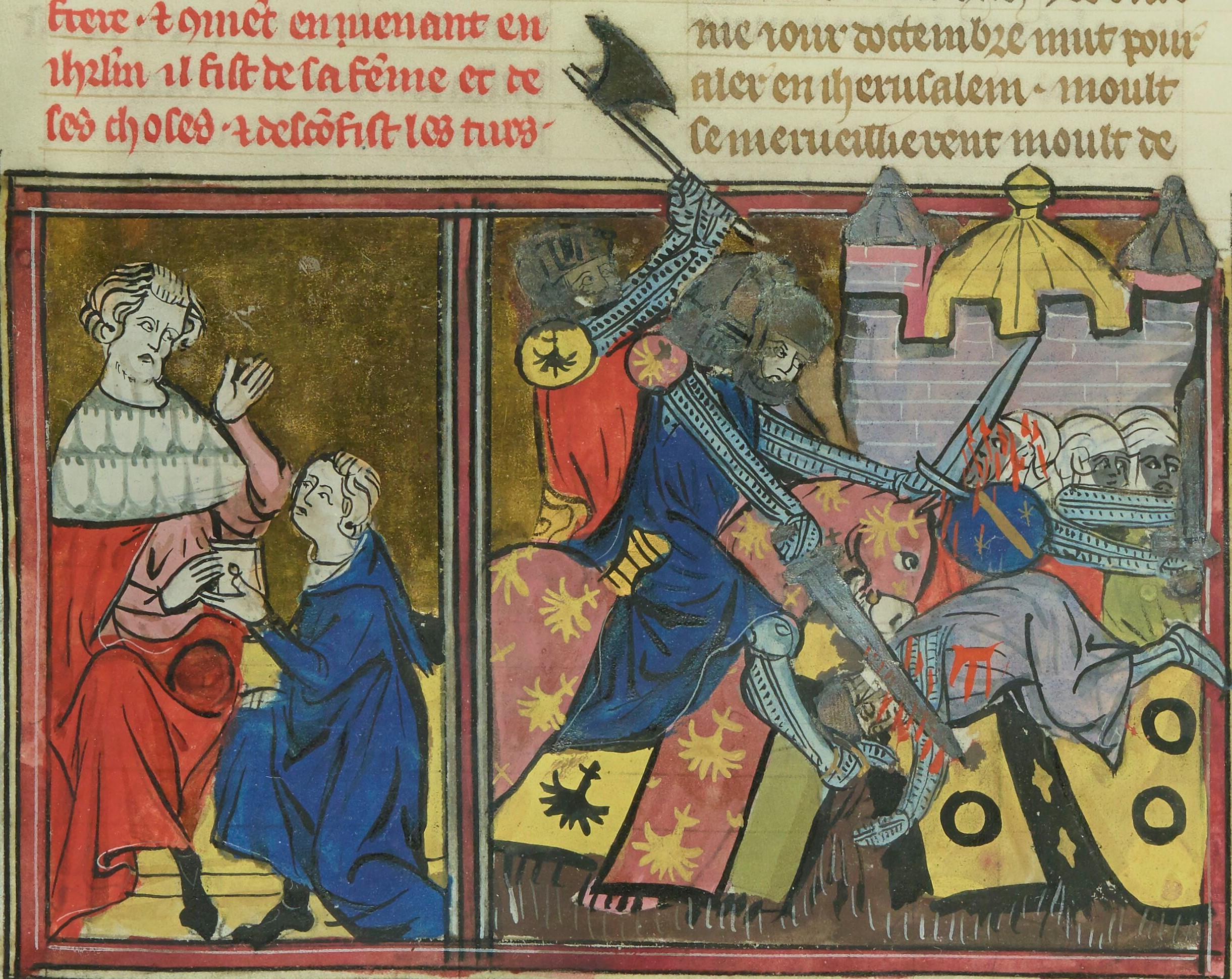
Battle of Nahr al-Kalb

News of Godfrey's death reached Edessa shortly after Baldwin's return from Melitene. His chaplain, Fulcher of Chartres, noticed that Baldwin "grieved somewhat over the death of his brother, but rejoiced more over his inheritance". To finance his journey to Jerusalem, Baldwin seized gold and silver from his subjects. He appointed his relative, Baldwin of Le Bourcq, his successor in the county and Le Bourcq swore fealty to him.

About 200 knights and 300–700 foot-soldiers accompanied Baldwin when he left Edessa on 2 October 1100. He spent four days in Antioch, but did not accept the local inhabitants' plea for him to administer the principality during Bohemond's captivity. Duqaq of Damascus wanted to ambush him on the narrow road near the mouth of the Nahr al-Kalb River. The qadi of Tripoli secretly warned Baldwin, which enabled him to defeat the attack and rout the Damascene troops. Tancred hurried to Jerusalem to persuade the garrison to surrender the town to him, but he was barred from the town.

Baldwin reached Jerusalem around 9 November. Daimbert withdrew to a monastery on Mount Zion, and the townspeople stopped Baldwin outside the walls and ceremoniously accompanied him to the Holy Sepulchre. Albert of Aix's sporadic references suggest that Baldwin adopted the title of prince. Baldwin first raided the environs of Ascalon, which was still held by the Egyptians, then launched a punitive expedition against the bandits who had their headquarters in the caves near Jerusalem. He made an incursion across the River Jordan before returning to Jerusalem on 21 December.

Baldwin was reconciled with Daimbert who agreed to anoint and crown him king. The ceremony took place in the Church of the Nativity in Bethlehem on Christmas Day. Thereafter Baldwin was most frequently styled king. For instance, a charter of grant in 1104 referred to him as "Baldwin, king of Judea and Jerusalem, and defensor of the Holiest Sepulchre of our Lord, Jesus Christ". In most of his charters, he also emphasised that he was Godfrey's lawful heir.

=== First successes ===
When Geldemar Carpenel laid claim to Haifa, stating that Tancred had arbitrarily seized it, Baldwin summoned Tancred to Jerusalem, but Tancred did not recognise him as the lawful monarch. They agreed to meet at a river near Jaffa, but their meeting did not result in compromise. The conflict was resolved when Tancred was invited to Antioch to administer the principality on Bohemond's behalf. Before leaving for Antioch in March, Tancred renounced his domains in Palestine, but also stipulated that the same domains should be granted in fief to him if he were to leave Antioch within fifteen months. Baldwin gave Haifa to Geldemar and the Galilee to Hugh of Fauquembergues.

A new papal legate, Maurice of Porto, came to Jerusalem in early March 1101. After Baldwin accused Daimbert of treachery and convinced Maurice to suspend him on 15 April, Daimbert had to bribe Baldwin with 300 bezants to persuade the legate to restore him to his office. The towns along the coast which were still under Egyptian rule—Arsuf, Caesarea, Acre and Tyre—sent gifts to Baldwin to secure his benevolence.

Always in need of funds, Baldwin concluded an alliance with the commanders of a Genoese fleet, offering commercial privileges and booty to them in the towns that he would capture with their support. They first attacked Arsuf, which surrendered without resistance on 29 April, securing a safe passage for the townspeople to Ascalon. The Egyptian garrison at Caesarea resisted, but the town fell on 17 May. Baldwin's soldiers pillaged Caesarea and massacred the majority of the adult local population. The Genoese received one third of the booty, but Baldwin did not grant areas in the captured towns to them.

=== Battles at Ramla ===
While Baldwin and the Genoese were besieging Caesarea, the Egyptian vizier, Al-Afdal Shahanshah, started mustering troops at Ascalon. Baldwin moved his headquarters to nearby Jaffa and fortified Ramla to hinder any attempt at a surprise attack against Jerusalem. He demanded more funds from Daimbert to cover the costs of this defense, but the patriarch refused. During a passionate debate in the presence of the papal legate, Daimbert stated that Baldwin should not "presume to make tributary and servant the holy Church". The legate persuaded Daimbert to promise that he would "maintain thirty soldiers by a money agreement", but the patriarch failed to raise the promised amount.

The lightly armed and undisciplined Egyptian army approached Ramla in early September. The much smaller, but experienced and well-equipped crusader forces were the first to attack, at dawn on 7 September. At least two of the five or six crusader corps were almost annihilated during the first phase of the battle, but Baldwin persuaded the remnants of his army to launch a fresh attack, surprising the Egyptians. After a short resistance, they fled in panic, pursued by the crusaders as far as Ascalon.

Roger Borsa, Duke of Apulia, sent money to Daimbert, partially for the recruitment of soldiers, but Daimbert retained the whole sum. After learning of this embezzlement, Baldwin convinced the papal legate to dismiss Daimbert in late 1101. Daimbert fled first to Jaffa, then to Tancred in Antioch. The vacancy enabled Baldwin to freely use the patriarch's rich treasury.

Stephen, Count of Blois, Hugh of Lusignan and other survivors of the catastrophic crusade of the previous year came to celebrate Easter in Jerusalem in 1102. Shortly thereafter, a strong Egyptian army invaded the kingdom. On 17 May, and against all advice, Baldwin and a force of about 500 horsemen that included dozens of new crusaders, rode out to meet the Egyptians. In this second battle fought at Ramla, the Egyptians were the victors, and they forced Baldwin and his men to take refuge in Ramla. Baldwin escaped from the fortress before the Egyptians laid siege to it, leaving his troops to be killed or captured. He fled to Arsuf, after which an English pirate, Godric, took him to Jaffa, although the Egyptian army had blockaded it from the land. He went to Jerusalem to gather new troops and returned to Jaffa with more than 100 horsemen. However, only the arrival of a fleet filled with hundreds of English, French and German pilgrims forced the Egyptians to lift the siege on 27 May. Baldwin wrote to Alexios I Komnenos, urging him not to obstruct their journey.

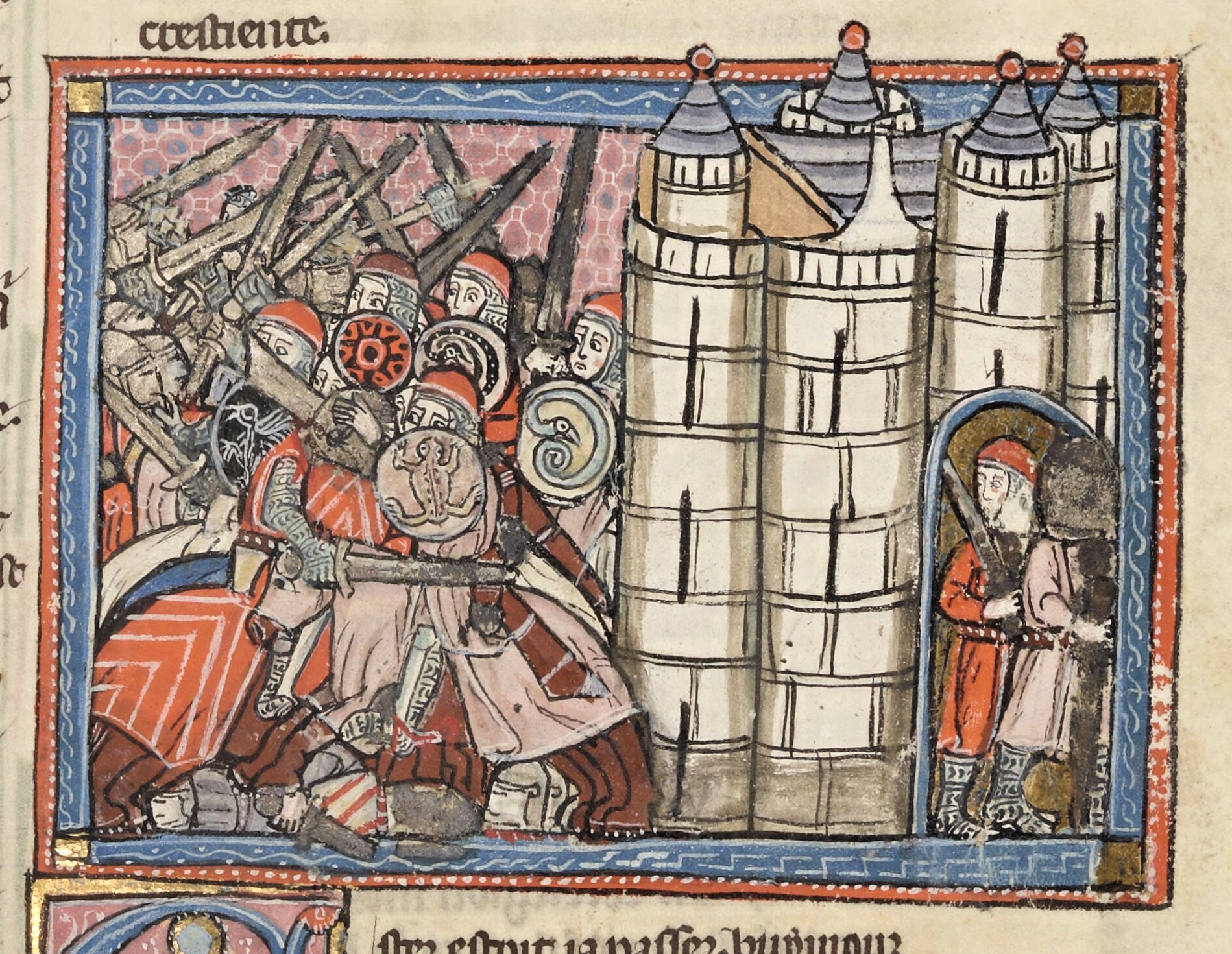
The third battle of Ramla (in 1105)

During the siege of Jaffa, Baldwin had sent envoys to Antioch and Edessa, seeking assistance from Tancred and Baldwin II. They arrived only after the Egyptians' withdrawal. Tancred tried to persuade the new papal legate, Robert of St Eusebio, to restore Daimbert, but Baldwin convinced Robert to discuss the issue with the local bishops and abbots. After the prelates unanimously stated that Daimbert had almost provoked a civil war and had abused his ecclesiastic authority, the legate allowed them to elect a pious priest, Evremar, as patriarch.

Baldwin laid siege to Acre in April 1103, but an Egyptian fleet relieved the town. He launched a raid against the bandits who had settled on Mount Carmel, but he was wounded in the kidneys and did not recover until the end of the year. After a fleet of Genoese and Pisan ships arrived at Haifa in April 1104, Baldwin made an alliance with their commanders and again besieged Acre. The town surrendered on 26 May after Baldwin promised a free passage to those who wanted to move to Ascalon, but the Italian sailors plundered the wealthy emigrants and killed many of them. Baldwin wanted to punish the Genoese, but the patriarch mediated a reconciliation and Baldwin had to grant one-third of the town to them. Acre had always been the most important port of trade between Syria and Europe, and the harbour dues generated significant revenues for him.

Duqaq's death on 14 June led to internal conflict in Damascus. The atabeg (or regent) Toghtekin emerged as the ruler, but faced strong opposition. Baldwin promised to support Duqaq's young brother Irtash against Toghtekin. His intervention brought about a rapprochement between the Sunnite Toghtekin and the Shiite Al-Afdal. After Egyptian horsemen and foot soldiers invaded the kingdom from the south, and Syrian mounted archers from the west in August 1105, Baldwin assembled the largest crusader army since the beginning of his reign. At his request, Patriarch Evremar displayed the True Cross before the army to strengthen the crusaders' self-confidence. They inflicted a decisive defeat on the Egyptian and Syrian armies at Ramla on 27 August.

=== Expansion ===
The Egyptians failed to launch any major military campaigns against the Kingdom of Jerusalem, but they did continually raid Baldwin's southern frontier. They massacred hundreds of pilgrims near Jaffa and defeated the governor of the town while Baldwin was fighting against Damascene troops in Galilee in October 1106. In 1107 the Egyptians attacked Hebron, but Baldwin forced them to lift the siege. The Egyptian raids did not prevent Baldwin from pursuing an expansionist policy. He compelled the governor of Sidon to pay a large tribute for a two-year truce in early 1106. Early the following year, he made a raid into Oultrejordain and forced the enemy to destroy a fortress recently built by Damascene troops to control the caravan routes. In August 1108 Baldwin and a band of Italian adventurers laid siege to Sidon, but the arrival of an Egyptian fleet and Turkish horsemen from Damascus forced him to abandon the siege. In late 1108, he concluded a ten-year truce with the Turkoman Emir of Damascus Toghtekin in exchange for one-third of state revenues from the northern regions of Oultrejordain.

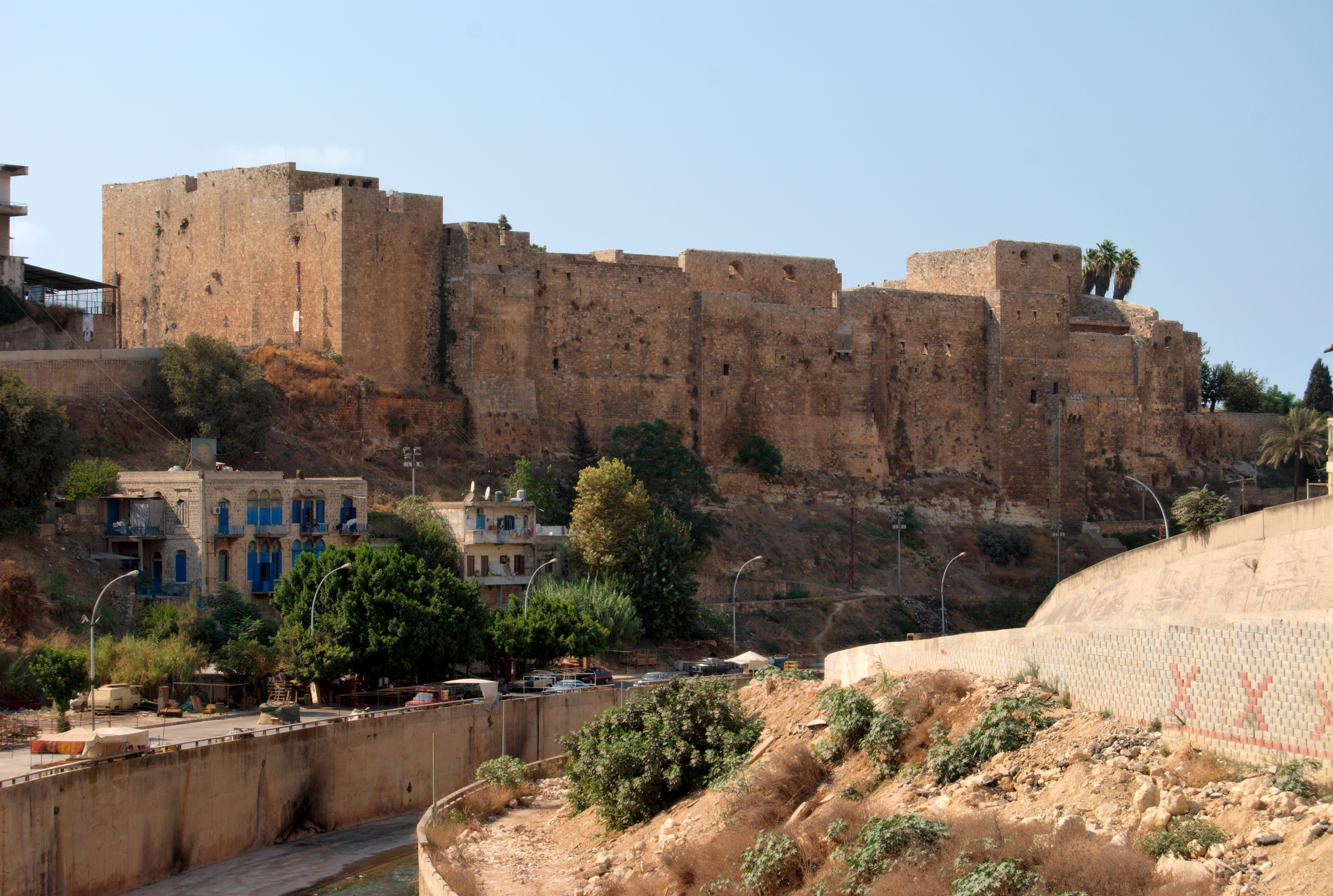
Mount Pilgrim at Tripoli

Bertrand, Count of Toulouse came to Syria to claim the lands that his father, Raymond of Saint Gilles, had conquered around Tripoli. Bertrand's cousin, William Jordan, who had ruled these lands since Raymond's death, refused to cede them to him. Bertrand sought Baldwin's assistance, while William Jordan secured Tancred's support. Tancred had already outraged Baldwin II of Edessa through refusing to abandon Turbessel. Baldwin convoked an assembly to put an end to the crusader leaders' conflicts. Since neither Tancred nor Jordan were his vassals, he summoned them in the name of the "whole church of Jerusalem" to the castle of Mount Pilgrim near Tripoli. At the assembly in June 1109, Tancred agreed to abandon Turbessel in return for his restoration to his old domains in the Kingdom of Jerusalem (Galilee, Haifa and the Temple of the Lord). Tancred did not take possession of his old domain, which remained under Baldwin's control. Raymond's inheritance was distributed between Bertrand and Jordan, with Bertrand swearing fealty to Baldwin, and Jordan to Tancred.

The crusader leaders united their forces to complete the conquest of Tripoli begun by Raymond. On 26 June, the Egyptian governor, Sharaf ad-Daulah, offered to surrender the town if a safe passage for those who wanted to leave the town was guaranteed. Baldwin accepted the offer, but he could not prevent the Genoese from killing all those inhabitants whom they could capture. Two-thirds of the town was granted to Bertrand of Toulouse who again took an oath of fealty to Baldwin. Baldwin captured Beirut on 13 May 1110, with the assistance of Bertrand and a Genoese fleet. He was again unable to prevent a general massacre of the townspeople.

Mawdud, the atabeg of Mosul, and his allies invaded the County of Edessa during the siege of Beirut. After the fall of Beirut, Baldwin and Bertrand hurried to Edessa to fight against the invaders. Baldwin II of Edessa accused Tancred of having incited the Muslim rulers to take actions against him. Regarding himself as the leader of all the Crusaders, Baldwin ordered Tancred to join the campaign and make peace with Baldwin II, otherwise he would declare Tancred the enemy of Christianity. Since most crusaders supported the King, Tancred had no choice but to obey. The incident strengthened Baldwin's suzerainty over Edessa. After the new reconciliation, the crusaders pursued Mawdud, but rumours about Muslim attacks against Antioch and Jerusalem forced them to stop the campaign. Before leaving the county, Baldwin suggested that the Christian (mainly Armenian) peasants should be transferred to the lands west of the Euphrates, because the Seljuk rulers had frequently raided the eastern regions. While the peasants were gathering at a ferry on the river, Mawdud made a sudden raid and massacred most of them.

Sigurd I of Norway—the first king to visit the Kingdom of Jerusalem—had meanwhile landed at Acre. Baldwin made an alliance with him and they laid siege to Sidon in October 1110. An Egyptian fleet routed the Norwegians, but the Doge of Venice, Ordelafo Faliero, and his fleet soon joined the crusaders and the town capitulated on 5 December. Baldwin spared the lives of the townspeople and many of them moved to Tyre and Damascus. The following year Baldwin marched to Ascalon: to prevent a siege the Egyptian governor of the town, Shams al-Khalīfa, promised to pay 70,000 dinars as a tribute and allowed crusader troops into the citadel. However, the townspeople rose up against al-Khalīfa in July and his Berber guards joined the rioters, murdering him and the crusader troops.

Mawdud launched a new expedition against the northern crusader states in August. At Tancred's request, Baldwin mustered his troops and hurried to the North. Bertrand of Tripoli, Baldwin II of Edessa and the Armenian rulers also came to fight against Mawdud, who was compelled to return to Mosul in the autumn. Shortly thereafter, Baldwin attacked a caravan that was travelling from Tyre to Damascus, carrying with it the city's most precious possessions, and was able to carry off the rich cargo. In late November, he laid siege to Tyre, although he had no supporting fleet. He was still besieging the town when a Byzantine embassy arrived. The Byzantines tried to persuade him to join a coalition against Tancred, while he wanted to secure their assistance against Tyre. They could not reach a compromise, but Izz al-Mulk, the Egyptian governor of Tyre, persuaded Toghtekin to come to the rescue of the besieged town. Toghtekin compelled Baldwin to lift the siege and withdraw to Acre in April 1112.

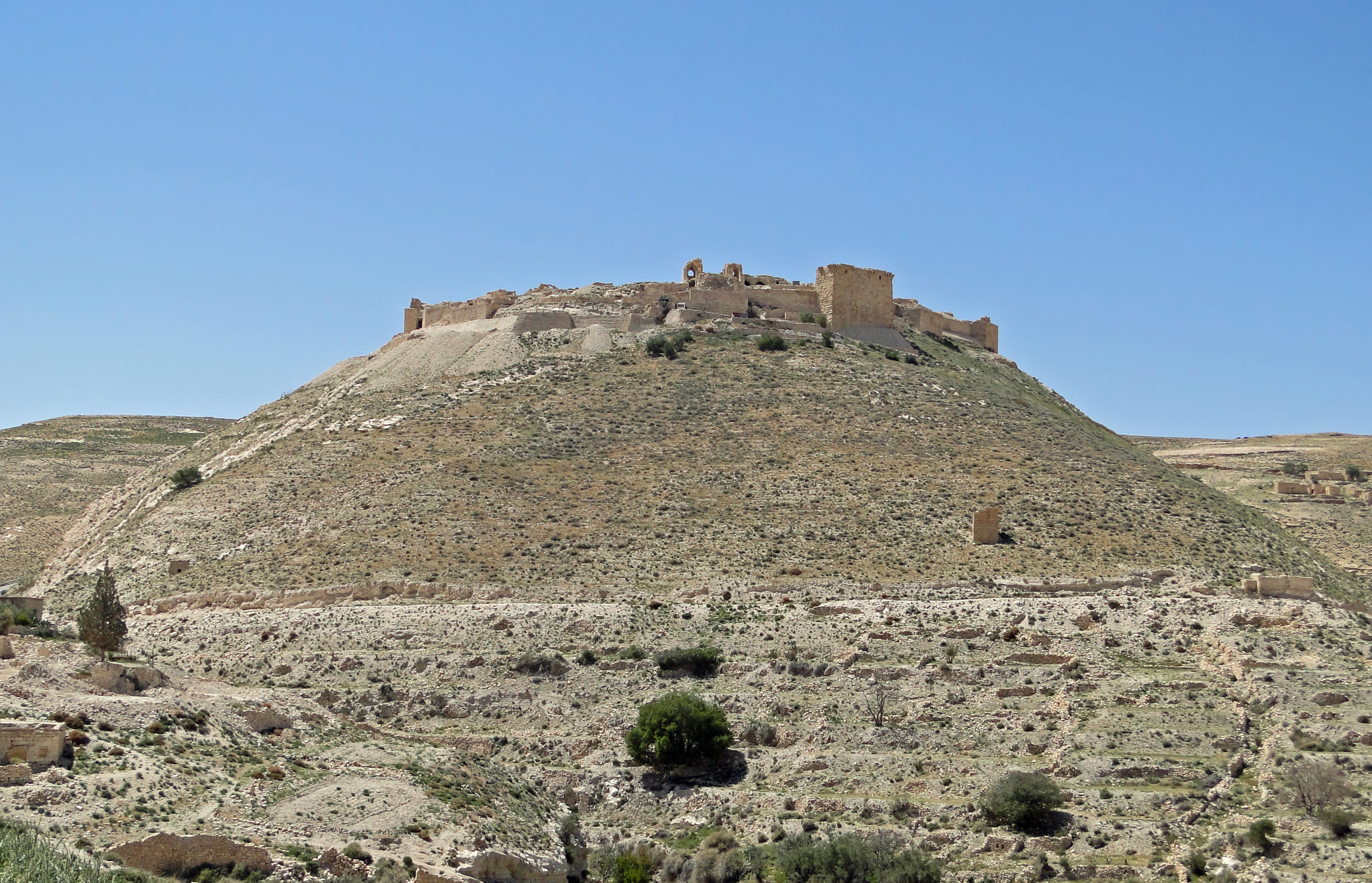
Montreal Castle (at Shoubak in Jordan)

Baldwin made an incursion against Damascene territory in 1113. Mawdud and an Artuqid emir, Ayaz, who came to assist Toghtekin against the crusaders, routed Baldwin in the Battle of al-Sannabra in late June, forcing him to seek assistance from the new rulers of Tripoli and Antioch, Pons and Roger. Toghtekin, Mawdud and Ayaz invaded Galilee, but they did not risk attacking Tiberias after the arrival of the troops from Tripoli and Antioch. Toghtekin and Mawdud returned to Damascus where an Assassin murdered Mawdud in late September. The Seljuk sultan, Muhammad I Tapar, sent a large army to northern Syria in spring 1115. In an attempt to maintain the equilibrium in the region, Toghtekin soon sought reconciliation with the crusaders. He made an alliance with the crusader rulers, and their coalition forced the Seljuk troops to withdraw without a fight.

With the pressure on the northern regions diminished, Baldwin was able to again deal with the Egyptians, who had already approached Jerusalem in 1113, and made a fresh attempt to capture Jaffa in 1115. Baldwin led an expedition across the Jordan and ordered the construction of the castle of Montreal in the autumn of 1115. The following year, he returned to the region and marched as far as Akaba on the Red Sea. After the local inhabitants fled from the town, Baldwin constructed castles in the town and on a nearby island and left a garrison in both fortresses. The three strongholds—Montreal, Eilat and Graye—secured the control of the caravan routes between Syria and Egypt. They also enabled Baldwin to continuously survey the movements of the Egyptian troops. From the Red Sea coast, Baldwin hastened to Tyre and began the construction of a new fortress, known as Scandelion Castle, at the Ladder of Tyre, which completed the blockade of the town from the mainland.

== Death ==
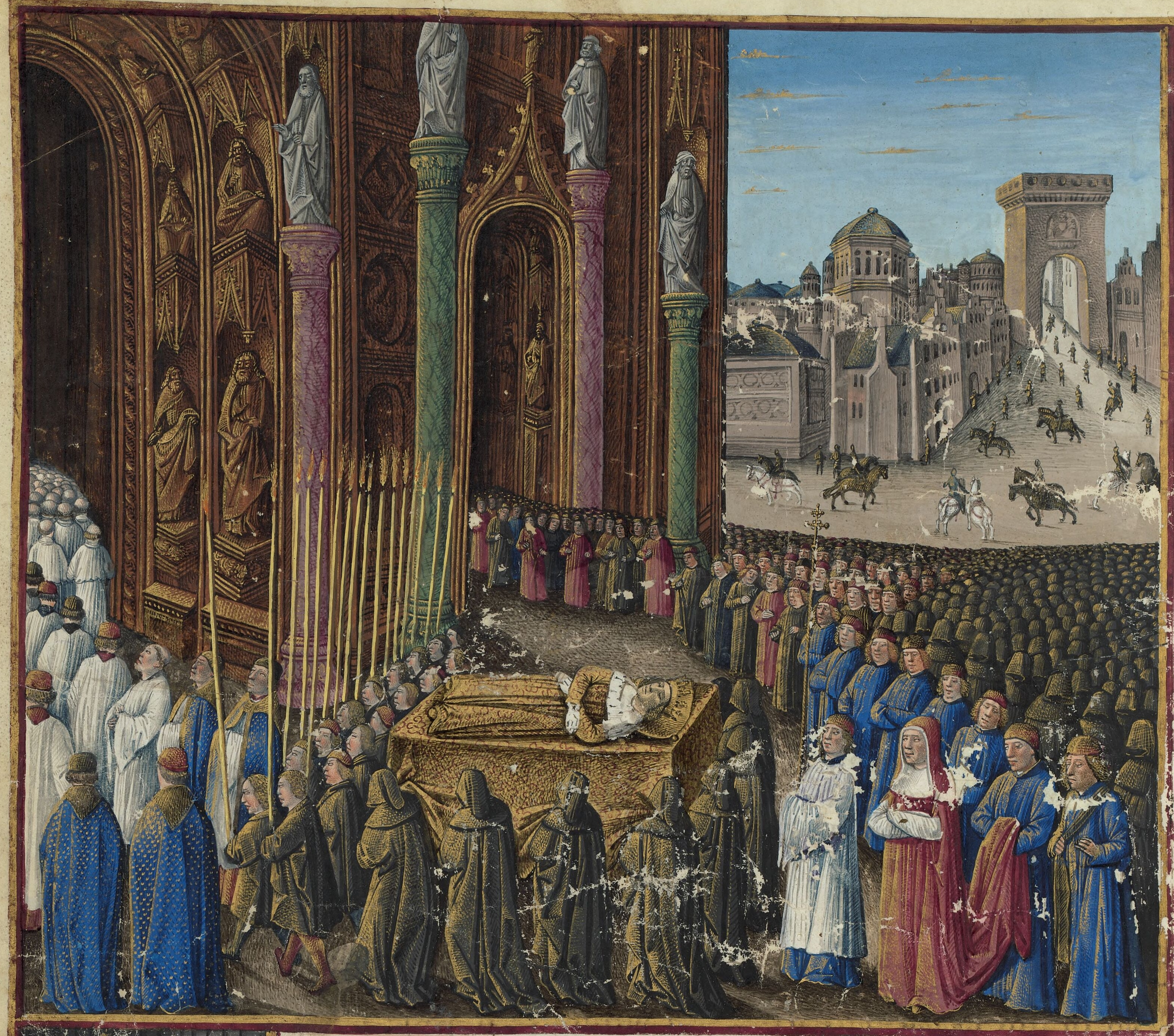
Funeral of Baldwin I

Baldwin fell seriously ill in late 1116. Thinking that he was dying, he ordered that all his debts be paid off and he started to distribute his money and goods, but he recovered at the start of the following year. To strengthen the defence of the southern frontier, he launched an expedition against Egypt in March 1118. He seized Farama on the Nile Delta without a fight as the townspeople had fled in panic before he reached the town. The late-12th-century Muslim historian Ibn Zafar al Siqilli wrote that Baldwin ordered the mosques in the town to be levelled. Baldwin's retainers urged him to attack Cairo, but the old wound that he had received in 1103 suddenly re-opened.

Dying, Baldwin was carried back as far as Al-Arish on the frontier of the Fatimid Empire. On his deathbed, he named Eustace III of Boulogne as his successor, but also authorised the barons to offer the throne to Baldwin of Edessa or "someone else who would rule the Christian people and defend the churches", if his brother did not accept the crown. Baldwin died on 2 April 1118. In accordance with his last wishes, his cook, Addo, removed his intestines and preserved his body in salt, so as to secure a burial in Jerusalem. He was buried in the Calvary Chapel of the Holy Sepulchre next to Godfrey of Bouillon five days later, on Palm Sunday.

== Legacy ==
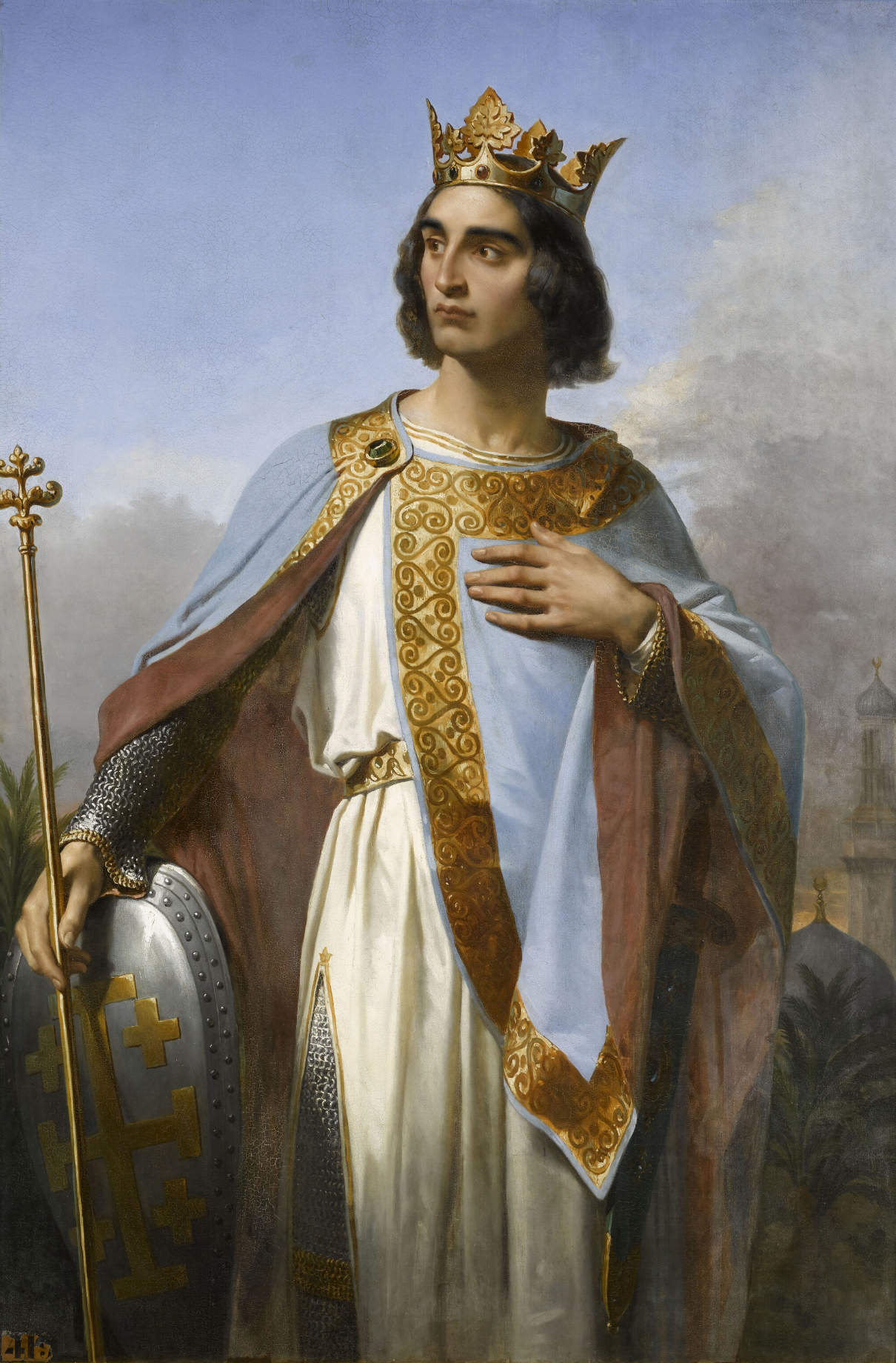
An 1844 portrait of Baldwin I by Merry-Joseph Blondel

Fulcher of Chartres described Baldwin as his subjects' "shield, strength and support; their right arm; the terror of his enemies." The Muslim historian, Ali ibn al-Athir, who completed his chronicle a century after Baldwin's death, thought that "al-Bardawil" had started the First Crusade. Presenting a fictional correspondence between Baldwin and Roger I of Sicily, al-Athir claimed that Baldwin had initially wanted to conquer Ifriqiya, but Roger, who wanted to secure the territory for himself, talked him into attacking Jerusalem.

Among modern historians, Thomas Asbridge states that Baldwin was one of the commanders of the First Crusade "whose skill, ambition and devotion drove the enterprise, and by turns threatened to rip it apart." Christopher Tyerman emphasises that Baldwin was a talented military commander and a clever politician, who "established a stable kingdom with defined and defensible borders." Amin Maalouf also concludes that Baldwin was the "principal architect of the occupation" of the Holy Land by the crusaders. Maalouf attributes Baldwin's success primarily to the "incorrigible fragmentation of the Arab world," which made the crusaders a "genuine regional power." Historian Christopher MacEvitt proposes that Baldwin was "adept at navigating the complexities of a world of competing local warlords," because the "political landscape" of his homeland, with its castellans dominating the countryside, was "not so different."

Baldwin's earliest extant charters were issued in the early 1100s, but the establishment of a chancery took years. Initially, clerics from Baldwin's homeland compiled the royal documents. The first chancellor, Pagan, was appointed only in 1115. Pagan had come to the Holy Land in the entourage of Baldwin's third wife, Adelaide del Vasto. The Bardawil lagoons are named after Baldwin, who died in nearby El-Arish.

== Family ==
Baldwin's wife Godehilde, the daughter of Raoul II of Tosny and Isabella of Montfort-l'Amaury, died during the First Crusade around 15 October 1097. Historian Malcolm Barber argues that her death "may have been the decisive event that persuaded" Baldwin "to seek out a lordship in the East". According to the historians Steven Runciman and Christopher MacEvitt, Baldwin and Godehilde had children who did not long survive her, but historian Alan V. Murray emphasises that no primary source states that Baldwin fathered children. According to Murray, Runciman was wrong when he translated William of Tyre's words about Baldwin's "familia" as a reference to his family, because William of Tyre was referring to Baldwin's household.

Uncertainty surrounds the name and family of his second wife, whom he married in the summer of 1098. Modern historians call her Arda and associate her father with Tatoul of Marash. Her father promised a dowry of 60,000 bezants and also pledged that she would inherit his lands, but he actually paid off only 7,000 bezants to Baldwin. The marriage was childless. Baldwin banished her to the convent of St Anne in Jerusalem before 1109, but she was soon allowed to move to Constantinople. Although they were separated, the marriage was never annulled.

Baldwin's third wife, Adelaide, was the wealthy widow of Roger I of Sicily. Her first husband died in 1102 and she acted as regent for their minor sons until the end of 1111. She was almost forty years old when the marriage was proposed in 1112. According to William of Tyre, Baldwin wanted to marry her because he had learnt of her wealth, and even agreed to make her son, Roger II of Sicily, his heir in Jerusalem. She landed at Palestine in August 1113, accompanied by hundreds of soldiers and bringing her rich dowry. Their marriage was bigamous, because Baldwin's second wife was still alive. After recovering from a serious illness in late 1116, Baldwin accepted clerical advice and sent an indignant Adelaide home. She sailed for Sicily on 25 April 1117. Her humiliation outraged Roger II so much that he denied all support to the Kingdom of Jerusalem during his lifetime.

Summarising Baldwin's marriages, historian Jonathan Phillips concludes that Baldwin "regarded women as useful sources of financial and political advancement but little else". Decades after Baldwin's death, William of Tyre wrote that Baldwin was "said to have struggled with weakness of the flesh", but only a few of his "body-servants" were aware of this. Historians Hans Eberhard Mayer, Christopher Tyerman and Malcolm Barber agree that William of Tyre most probably referred to Baldwin's homosexuality. Tyerman adds that a converted Muslim was one of Baldwin's lovers, but he betrayed Baldwin during the siege of Sidon. He proposed that the defenders of the town kill the King, but Baldwin was warned in advance. On the other hand, Susan B. Edgington states that there is "little evidence to support" the theories about Baldwin's homosexuality, emphasizing that his contemporaries made no reference to it.

== Sources ==
=== Primary sources ===
- Albert of Aachen: Historia Ierosolimitana – History of the Journey to Jerusalem (Edited and translated by Susan B. Edgington) (2007). Oxford University Press. ISBN 978-0-19-920486-1.
- Anna Comnena: The Alexiad (Translated by E. R. A. Sewter) (1969). Penguin Books. ISBN 978-0-14-044958-7. (registration required)

=== Secondary sources ===
- Asbridge, Thomas (2004). The First Crusade: A New History: The Roots of Conflict between Christianity and Islam. Oxford University Press. ISBN 978-0-19-517823-4. (registration required)
- Barber, Malcolm (2012). The Crusader States. Yale University Press. ISBN 978-0-300-11312-9.
- Edgington, Susan B. (2019). Baldwin I of Jerusalem, 1100-1118. Routledge. ISBN 978-1-4724-3356-5.
- France, John (1994). Victory in the East: A military history of the First Crusade. Cambridge University Press. ISBN 978-0-521-41969-7. (registration required)
- Hillenbrand, Carole (2000). The Crusades: Islamic Perspectives. Routledge. ISBN 978-0-415-92914-1.
- Jaspert, Nikolas (2006). The Crusades. Routledge. ISBN 978-0-415-35967-2.
- Lilie, Ralph-Johannes (1993). Byzantium and the Crusader States 1096-1204. Oxford University Press. ISBN 978-0-19-820407-7.
- Lock, Peter (2006). The Routledge Companion to the Crusades. Routledge. ISBN 9-78-0-415-39312-6.
- Maalouf, Amin (1984). The Crusades Through Arab Eyes. SAQI. ISBN 978-0-86356-023-1. (registration required)
- MacEvitt, Christopher (2010). The Crusades and the Christian World of the East: Rough Tolerance. University of Pennsylvania Press. ISBN 978-0-8122-4050-4.
- Murray, Alan V. (2000). The Crusader Kingdom of Jerusalem: A Dynastic History, 1099–1125. Prosopographica et Geneologica. ISBN 978-1-9009-3403-9.
- Phillips, Jonathan (2010). Holy Warriors: A Modern History of the Crusades. Vintage Books. ISBN 978-1-8459-5078-1.
- Runciman, Steven (1989) [1951]. A history of the Crusades. Vol. 1. Cambridge: Cambridge University Press. ISBN 978-0-521-06161-2.

(registration required)

- Runciman, Steven (1989) [1952]. A History of the Crusades, Volume II: The Kingdom of Jerusalem and the Frankish East. Vol. 2. Cambridge: Cambridge University Press. ISBN 978-0-521-06162-9.

(registration required)

- Tanner, Heather J. (2003). "In His Brother's Shadow: The Crusading Career and Reputation of Eustace III of Boulogne". In Semaan, Khalil I. (ed.). The Crusades: Other Experiences, Alternate Perspectives: Selected Proceedings from the 32nd Annual CEMERS Conference. State University of New York at Binghamton. Center for Medieval and Early Renaissance Studies. pp. 83–100. ISBN 978-1-58684-251-2.
- Tibble, Steven (1989). Monarchy and Lordships in the Latin Kingdom of Jerusalem, 1099-1291. Clarendon Press. ISBN 978-0-19-822731-1.
- Tyerman, Christopher (2006). God's War: A New History of the Crusades. The Belknap Press of Harvard University Press. ISBN 978-0-674-02387-1. (registration required)

Regnal titles
New creation	Count of Edessa; 1098–1100	Succeeded by Baldwin II
Preceded by Godfrey as prince	King of Jerusalem; 1100–1118	Succeeded by Baldwin II
