= Battle of Ramla (1102) =

Battle in Middle East

Coordinates: 31°55.5′N 34°52.4′E

Second Battle of Ramla
- Part of the Crusades
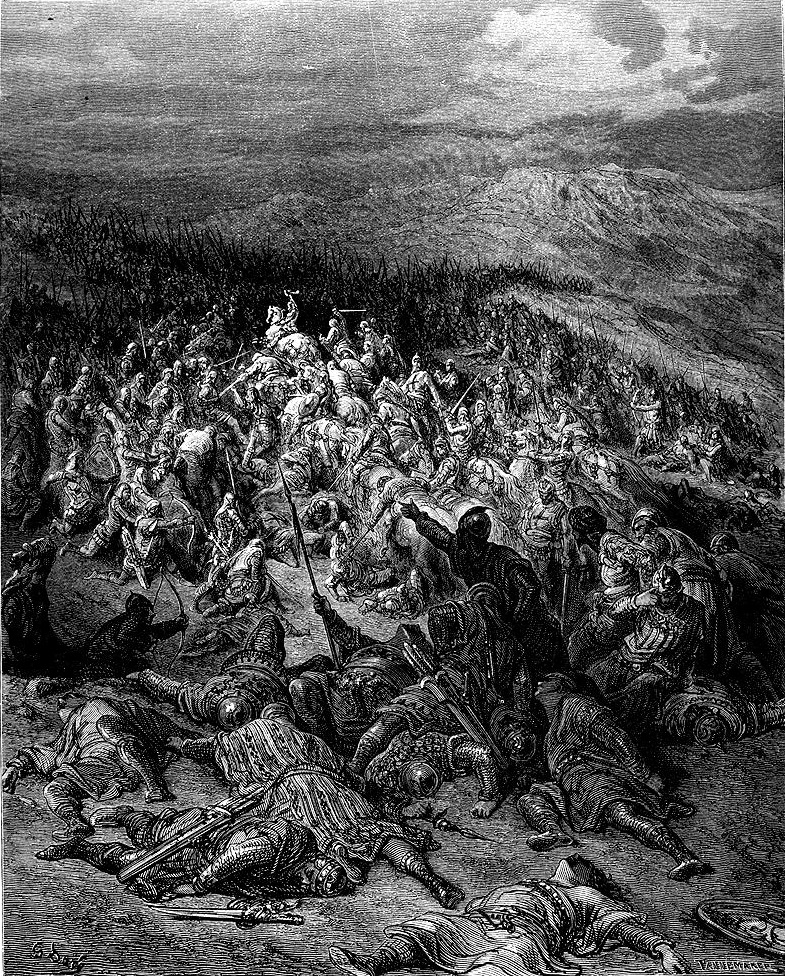
- Two Hundred Knights Attack Twenty Thousand Saracens. Illustration by Gustave Doré (1877)
Date	17 May 1102
Location	Ramla, border line between Crusaders and Fatimids (modern Israel)
Result	Fatimid victory

Belligerents
Fatimid Caliphate	Kingdom of Jerusalem

Commanders and leaders
Sharaf al-Ma'ali	Baldwin I of Jerusalem; Stephen of Blois (executed)

Strength
Modern estimates: 3,000–5,000; Contemporary sources: 20,000	200 knights

Casualties and losses
Unknown	200 killed

The Second Battle of Ramla (or Ramleh) took place in the Levant on 17 May 1102 between the Kingdom of Jerusalem and the Fatimid Caliphate of Egypt.

== Background ==
The town of Ramla lay on the road from Jerusalem to Ascalon, the latter of which was the largest Fatimid fortress in Palestine. From Ascalon the Fatimid vizier, Al-Afdal Shahanshah, launched almost annual attacks into the newly founded Crusader kingdom from 1099 to 1107. The two armies met on three occasions at Ramla.

Egyptian armies of the period relied on masses of Sudanese bowmen supported by Arab and Berber cavalry. Since the archers were on foot and the horsemen awaited attack with lance and sword, an Egyptian army provided exactly the sort of immobile target that the Frankish heavy cavalry excelled in attacking. Whereas the Crusaders developed a healthy respect for the harass and surround tactics of the Turkish horse archers, they tended to discount the effectiveness of the Egyptian armies. While overconfidence led to a Crusader disaster at the second battle of Ramla, the more frequent result was a Fatimid defeat. "The Franks never, until the reign of Saladin, feared the Egyptian as they did the armies from Muslim Syria and Mesopotamia."

== Battle ==
After the victory of the Crusaders at the first Battle of Ramla on 7 September 1101, al-Afdal was ready to strike at the Crusaders once again and dispatched around 20,000 troops under the command of his son Sharaf al-Ma'ali. King Baldwin I of Jerusalem was in Jaffa seeing off survivors of the defeated Crusade of 1101, when news reached him of the Fatimid invasion force. Duke William IX of Aquitaine had already departed, but many others such as Counts Stephen II of Blois and Stephen I of Burgundy had been forced back due to unfavorable winds and consequently joined Baldwin's force in order to help in the battle. Due to faulty reconnaissance Baldwin severely underestimated the size of the Egyptian army, believing it to be no more than a minor expeditionary force, and on 17 May 1102 he rode to face an army of several thousand with only 200 mounted knights and no infantry.

Realizing his error too late and already cut off from escape, Baldwin and his army were charged by the Egyptian forces, and many were quickly slaughtered, although Baldwin and a handful of others managed to barricade themselves in Ramla's single tower. Baldwin was left with no other option than to flee and escaped the tower under the cover of night with just his scribe and a single knight, Hugh of Brulis, who is not mentioned in any source afterwards. Baldwin spent the next two days evading Fatimid search parties until he arrived exhausted, starved, and parched in the reasonably safe haven of Arsuf on 19 May.

The situation of the remaining knights in Ramla deteriorated when Fatimid forces stormed the town on the morning of 18 May, with only the tower remaining under Crusader control. The Fatimids ruthlessly attacked the tower, undermining walls and setting fires to smoke out the desperate defenders. After a day of desperately holding their ground the remaining knights, all but abandoned by their king, decided to launch a suicidal last stand and charged the besiegers. Almost all of the meagre force was immediately slain including both Stephens, with Stephen of Blois finally recovering the honour that he had lost when he deserted the Siege of Antioch four years previously. However, Conrad, marshal of Henry IV, Holy Roman Emperor, who had previously led a contingent at the Crusade of 1101, fought so valiantly that even after everyone around him was dead he still fought on, holding off the Fatimids to the point that his awestruck foe offered to spare his life if he surrendered.

== Siege of Jaffa and aftermath ==
Having recuperated in Arsuf, Baldwin commandeered an English pirate ship to break through the Egyptian blockade of Jaffa while a force of 80 knights under Hugh of Falchenburg attempted to break in by land. The victorious Sharaf al-Ma'ali had surrounded the city and, with their king missing and the army presumed destroyed, capitulation seemed inevitable. In order to coax the city into surrender, the Fatimids made the corpse of Gerbod of Scheldewindeke, a knight who had fallen in battle previously, to look like Baldwin before mutilating the body and parading it in front of the walls of Jaffa. Gerbod had apparently held a resemblance to Baldwin, and the Crusaders fell for the ruse, with preparations to flee the city underway when Baldwin arrived just in time.

At Baldwin's arrival Sharaf withdrew, allowing Baldwin time to organize a counterattack. With Baldwin's forces strengthened by the arrival of a fleet of French and German Crusaders, he was able to assemble an army of 8,000 men and surprised the unprepared Egyptians. Discontent was already arising from Sharaf's indecisive leadership, and the Fatimids quickly retreated back to Ascalon. Although Baldwin succeeded in defending his kingdom, his miscalculation had cost the lives of a number of prominent knights which the nascent Kingdom of Jerusalem could ill afford to lose. Further Fatimid incursions continued, with the two nations meeting in battle at Ramla for a third time in 1105.
