= 1138 =

1138 in various calendars
- Gregorian calendar: 1138; MCXXXVIII
- Ab urbe condita: 1891
- Armenian calendar: 587; ԹՎ ՇՁԷ
- Assyrian calendar: 5888
- Balinese saka calendar: 1059–1060
- Bengali calendar: 544–545
- Berber calendar: 2088
- English Regnal year: 3 Ste. 1 – 4 Ste. 1
- Buddhist calendar: 1682
- Burmese calendar: 500
- Byzantine calendar: 6646–6647
- Chinese calendar: 丁巳年 (Fire Snake); 3835 or 3628 — to — 戊午年 (Earth Horse); 3836 or 3629
- Coptic calendar: 854–855
- Discordian calendar: 2304
- Ethiopian calendar: 1130–1131
- Hebrew calendar: 4898–4899
- Hindu calendars
- Vikram Samvat: 1194–1195
- Shaka Samvat: 1059–1060
- Kali Yuga: 4238–4239
- Holocene calendar: 11138
- Igbo calendar: 138–139
- Iranian calendar: 516–517
- Islamic calendar: 532–533
- Japanese calendar: Hōen 4 (保延４年)
- Javanese calendar: 1044–1045
- Julian calendar: 1138; MCXXXVIII
- Korean calendar: 3471
- Minguo calendar: 774 before ROC 民前774年
- Nanakshahi calendar: −330
- Seleucid era: 1449/1450 AG
- Thai solar calendar: 1680–1681
- Tibetan calendar: མེ་མོ་སྦྲུལ་ལོ་ (female Fire-Snake); 1264 or 883 or 111 — to — ས་ཕོ་རྟ་ལོ་ (male Earth-Horse); 1265 or 884 or 112

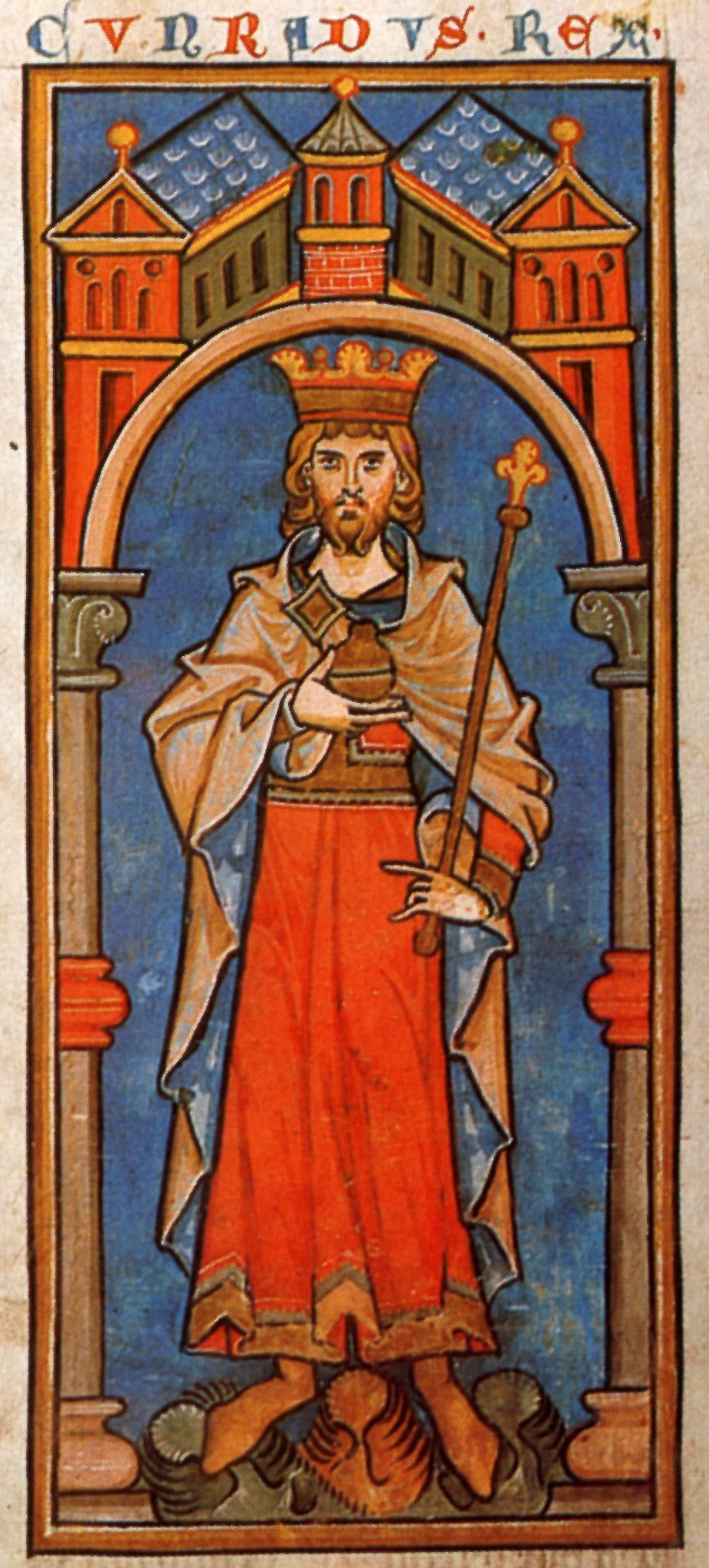
King Conrad III (r. 1138–1152)

Year 1138 (MCXXXVIII) was a common year starting on Saturday of the Julian calendar.

== Events ==
=== By place ===
==== Europe ====
- March 7 – Conrad III is elected as King of Germany, in the presence of the papal legate Theodwin at Koblenz. He is crowned at Aachen six days later (on March 13), and acknowledged in Bamberg by several German princes of southern Germany. Henry X (the Proud), son-in-law and heir of the late King Lothair III, refuses his allegiance to Conrad. He is deprived of all his Saxon territories, which are given to Leopold IV (the Generous).
- Summer – A civil war breaks out in the Holy Roman Empire, a struggle begins between the Guelphs and Ghibellines, while the family name Welf of Henry X will be corrupted into Guelph.
- October 20 – Bolesław III Wrymouth dies after a 31-year reign. He divides Poland among his sons: Władysław II the Exile receives Silesia and the Senioral territories – which include the Kraków and Łęczyca regions, as well as parts of Kujawy and Greater Poland (Wielkopolska). Bolesław IV the Curly receives Masovia and Mieszko III the Old receives the newly established Duchy of Greater Poland. The 7-year-old Henry becomes duke of Sandomierz. Bolesław's last son, Casimir II the Just, receives nothing, as he is born 8 days after his father's death.

==== Britain ====
- May – Earl Robert FitzRoy rebels against King Stephen, supporting Matilda (his step-sister) in her claim for the English throne. Matilda is given refuge by Earl William de Albini at Arundel Castle. Stephen builds siege works around the castle, but is unable to break the castle's defences. In France, Matilda's husband Duke Geoffrey V (the Fair) takes advantage of the situation by re-invading Normandy.
- August 22 – Battle of the Standard: King David I of Scotland gives his full support to Matilda (daughter of the late King Henry I), and invades the north of England – travelling as far south as Lincolnshire. The Scottish army (some 15,000 men) is defeated by English forces under Earl William le Gros in Yorkshire. David retreats to Carlisle and reassembles an army.
- The Earldom of Pembroke, created for Gilbert de Clare, becomes the first earldom created by Stephen within the borders of Wales. Gilbert receives the rape and Pevensey Castle.

==== Middle East ====
- April 20 – Byzantine Emperor John II Komnenos, having led an expeditionary force into Syria, arrives before the walls of Aleppo. The city proves too strong to attack, but the fortresses of Biza'a, Athareb, Ma'arrat Nu'man and Kafartab are taken by assault. While the Byzantines besiege the city of Shaizar, the Crusader allies Prince Raymond of Poitiers of Antioch and Count Joscelin II of Edessa remain in their camp playing dice.
- April 28 – Siege of Shaizar begins. The Byzantines under John II besiege the capital of the Munqidhite Emirate. They capture the lower city on May 20, but fail to take the citadel. John negotiates with Emir Abu'l Asakir Sultan who sends him an offer to pay a large indemnity and become a vassal of the Byzantine Empire. John, disgusted by his Crusader allies, accepts the terms and raises the siege on May 21.
- June 6 – Al-Rashid Billah (deposed caliph of Baghdad), having fled to Isfahan, is killed there by a team of four Nizari Ismailis (Assassins). This is celebrated in Alamut for a week by Shias.
- October 11 – An earthquake in Aleppo, Syria, kills about 230,000 people.

==== Asia ====
- November 5 – Lý Anh Tông is enthroned as emperor of Đại Việt at the age of two, starting a 37-year reign.

=== By topic ===
==== Religion ====
- April 10 – Robert Warelwast is nominated as bishop of Exeter at a royal council in Northampton, England.

== Births ==
- Casimir II the Just, duke of Poland (d. 1194)
- Conan IV (the Young), duke of Brittany (d. 1171)
- Fujiwara no Narichika, Japanese nobleman (d. 1178)
- Hōjō Tokimasa, Japanese nobleman and regent (d. 1215)
- Saladin (the Lion), sultan of Egypt and Syria (d. 1193)
- Taira no Shigemori, Japanese nobleman (d. 1179)
- Tancred ("the Monkey King"), king of Sicily (d. 1194)

== Deaths ==
- January 13 or January 14 – Simon I, duke of Lorraine (b. 1076)
- February 19 – Irene Doukaina, Byzantine empress
- May 11 – William de Warenne, 2nd Earl of Surrey, Anglo-Norman nobleman
- May 27 – Hadmar I of Kuenring, German nobleman
- June 6 – Al-Rashid Billah, deposed ruler of the Abbasid Caliphate, assassinated (b. 1109)
- August 12 – Suero Vermúdez, Asturian nobleman
- October 28 – Bolesław III (Wrymouth), duke of Poland (b. 1086)
- Amhlaoibh Mór mac Fir Bhisigh, Irish poet and cleric
- Arwa al-Sulayhi, queen and co-ruler of Yemen (b. 1048)
- Avempace, Andalusian polymath and philosopher (b. 1085)
- Chen Yuyi, Chinese politician of the Song dynasty (b. 1090)
- David the Scot, bishop of Bangor (approximate date)
- Kiya Buzurg Ummid, ruler of the Nizari Isma'ili State
- Rodrigo Martínez, Leonese nobleman and diplomat
- Rudolf of St. Trond, French Benedictine chronicler
- Someshvara III, ruler of the Western Chalukya Empire
- Vakhtang (or Tsuata), Georgian nobleman (b. 1118)
