= Siege of Shaizar (1157) =

Failed crusader attack in Syria

- Part of the Crusades
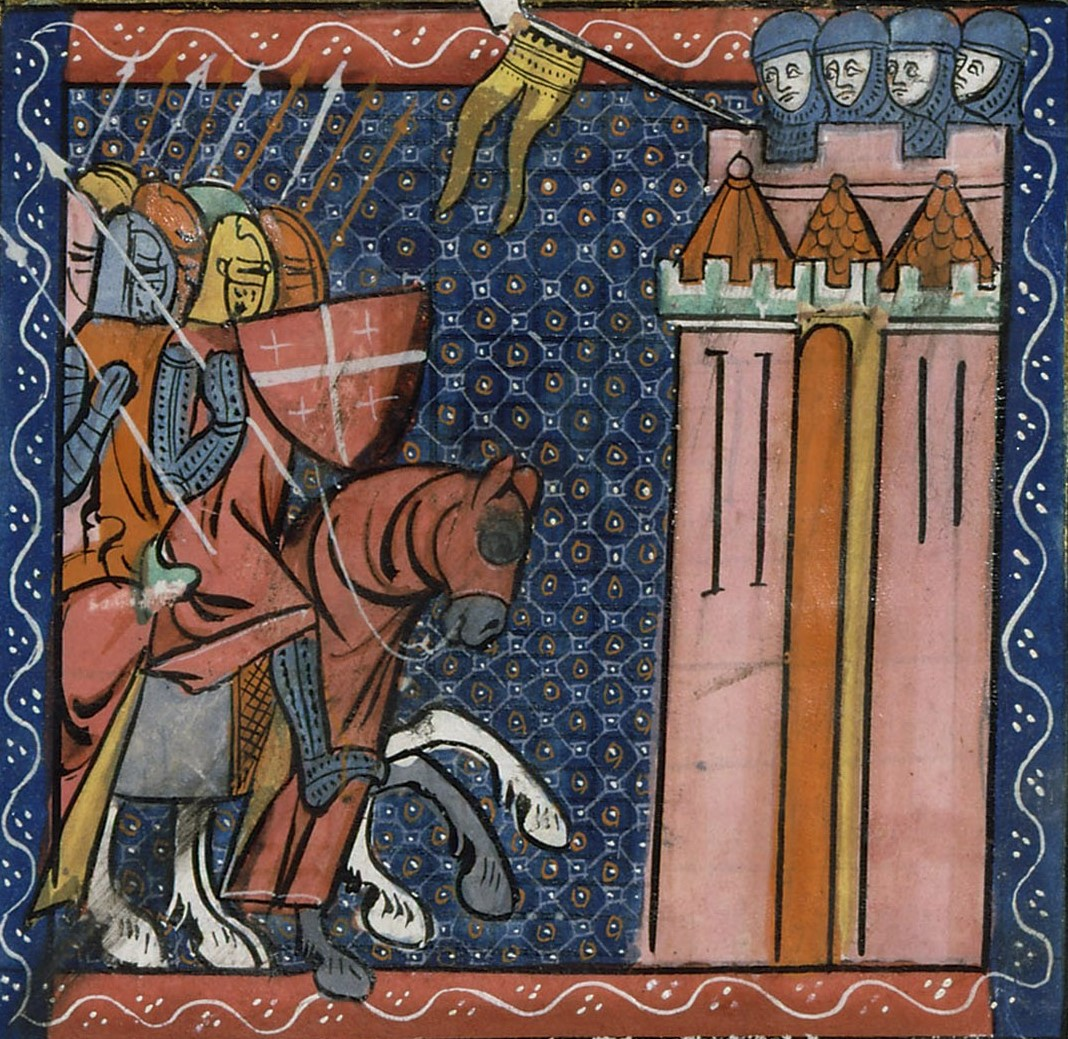
Date	November 1157
Location	Shaizar, Syria 35°16′04″N 36°34′00″E
Result	Siege abandoned; Zengids seize Shaizar back from the Assassins

Belligerents
Jerusalem; Antioch; Flanders; Tripoli	Zengids	Assassins

The siege of Shaizar in late 1157 was part of the effort of the leaders of the crusader states to take advantage of the illness of the Syrian ruler Nur ad-Din Zengi and expand eastwards. King Baldwin III of Jerusalem, Prince Raynald of Antioch, and Counts Thierry of Flanders and Raymond III of Tripoli successfully seized the lower city, but a dispute over the future status of Shaizar erupted between them while they were attacking the citadel, and they withdrew because they could not settle it.

== Background ==
In 1138, allied armies of the Byzantine Empire and crusader states attempted to capture Shaizar in a siege, but failed because of quarrels and intrigues amongst the crusaders. In July and August 1157, a series of severe earthquakes struck several cities in Muslim-held parts of Syria, inflicting heavy damage. The Munqidhite ruler of Shaizar (who had been friendly with the neighboring Christian rulers) and his whole household were killed, and political disarray ensued in Shaizar. Nur al-Din Zengi, the ruler of Aleppo and Damascus who had thus far been unable to exert direct rule over it, moved to occupy the city rather than allow it to fall into Christian hands.

Count Thierry of Flanders arrived in Syria with a substantial entourage in mid-1157, raising Christian hopes for renewed military action against the Muslims. Count Thierry, King Baldwin III of Jerusalem, Lord Reginald of Sidon, and Count Raymond III of Tripoli gathered a powerful army. Nur al-Din fell seriously ill in October and his army became disorganized. Seeing a chance to press their advantage, the Franks sent an urgent appeal to the lord of Armenian Cilicia, Toros II, and he arrived with reinforcements. The allied forces then marched on Shaizar unimpeded. At this point another contender appeared and seized the city first: the Masyaf-based Order of Assassins.

== Siege ==
Probably arriving in November, the Christian leaders found Shaizar ill-prepared for a siege. It was primarily a center of trade rather than a fortified outpost and had not anticipated an assault—its inhabitants were unaware that Nur al-Dīn had fallen ill. The lower city fell with relative ease. A firm blockade drove the population behind the city walls, while siege engines steadily broke through the defenses. The townspeople, seemingly unaccustomed to warfare, abandoned their posts after several days and withdrew to the citadel. The citadel was wedged between the Orontes River and the residential area, which offered it protection, and the Assassins defended it with determination.

A heated dispute then erupted among the attackers. King Baldwin intended for Shaizar to be granted to Count Thierry, whom he believed to be strong enough to hold it. The king may have had in mind the establishment of another crusader state beyond the Orontes to replace the County of Edessa, which had fallen in 1144-1150. Prince Raynald protested that Shaizar had earlier paid tribute to Antioch and that the future ruler of Shaizar should therefore pay homage to him. Thierry, on account of his rank and wealth, refused to swear fealty to Raynald and would only swear it to Baldwin. Because this dispute could not be resolved, the Christians abandoned the siege.

== Aftermath ==
After the Christian leaders' departure, Nur al-Din promptly sent an emir to take charge of Shaizar. Once he had regained his health, Nur al-Din visited Shaizar and oversaw its restoration, repaired both the damage from the siege and the destruction caused by the earthquake, and reestablished its fortifications. The last semi-autonomous town in central Syria was thus absorbed into the growing Zengid dominion. The Christians laid a successful siege to Harim instead, capturing it in January 1158.
