= Usama ibn Munqidh =

Banu Munqidh poet and historian

- مجد الدّين اُسامة ابن مُرشد ابن على ابن مُنقذ الكنانى الكلبى
- Born: 4 July 1095; Shaizar, Seljuk Empire
- Died: 17 November 1188 (aged 93); Damascus, Zengid State
- Resting place: Mount Qasiyun
- Occupations: Poet, courtier, soldier
- Children: Murhaf ibn Munqidh
- Parent: Murshid ibn Munqidh
- Relatives: Sultan ibn Munqidh

Majd ad-Dīn Usāma ibn Murshid ibn ʿAlī ibn Munqidh al-Kināni al-Kalbī (also Usamah, Ousama, etc.; Arabic: مجد الدّين اُسامة ابن مُرشد ابن على ابن مُنقذ الكنانى الكلبى) (4 July 1095 – 17 November 1188) or Ibn Munqidh was a medieval Arab Muslim poet, author, faris (knight), and diplomat from the Banu Munqidh dynasty of Shaizar in northern Syria. His life coincided with the rise of several medieval Muslim dynasties, the arrival of the First Crusade, and the establishment of the crusader states.

He was the nephew and potential successor of the emir of Shaizar, but was exiled in 1131 and spent the rest of his life serving other leaders. He was a courtier to the Burids, Zengids, and later Ayyubids in Damascus, serving Zengi, Nur ad-Din, and Saladin over a period of almost fifty years. He also served the Fatimid court in Cairo, as well as the Artuqids in Hisn Kayfa. He travelled extensively in Arab lands, visiting Egypt, Syria, Palestine and along the Tigris River, and went on pilgrimage to Mecca. He often meddled in the politics of the courts in which he served, and he was exiled from both Damascus and Cairo.

During and immediately after his life, he was most famous as a poet and adib (a "man of letters"). He wrote many poetry anthologies, such as the Kitab al-'Asa ("Book of the Staff"), Lubab al-Adab ("Kernels of Refinement"), and al-Manazil wa'l-Diyar ("Dwellings and Abodes"), and collections of his own original poetry. In modern times, he is remembered more for his Kitab al-I'tibar ("Book of Learning by Example" or "Book of Contemplation"), which contains lengthy descriptions of the crusaders, whom he interacted with on many occasions, and some of whom he considered friends.

Most of his family was killed in an earthquake at Shaizar in 1157. He died in Damascus in 1188, at the age of 93.

== Early life ==
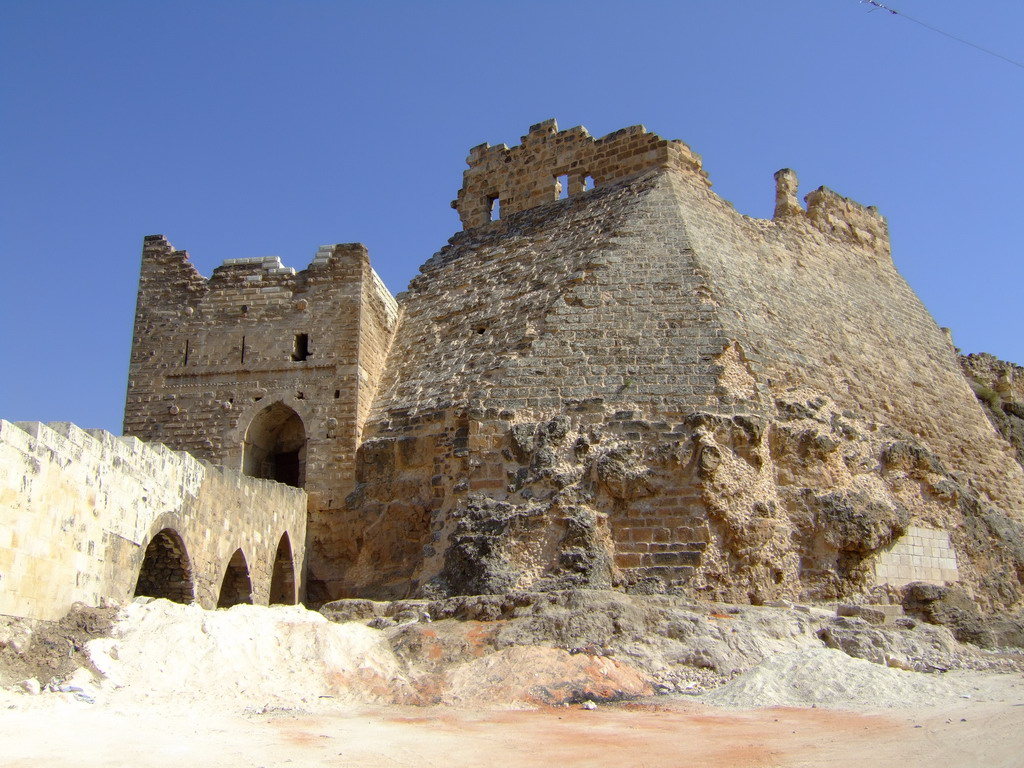
The fortress of Shaizar.

Usama was the son of Murshid, and the nephew of Nasr, emir of Shaizar. Shaizar was seen as a strategically important site and the gateway to enter and control inner Syria. The Arabs initially conquered Shaizar during the Muslim conquest of the Levant in 637. Due to its importance it exchanged hands numerous times between the Arabs and Byzantines, who regained it in 999. In 1025 the Banu Munqidh tribe were given an allocation of land beside Shaizar by the ruler of Hama, Salih ibn Mirdas. Over time they expanded their lands building fortifications and castles until Usama's grandfather Izz al-Dawla al-Murhaf Nasr retook it in 1080.

When Nasr died in 1098, Usama's father, Majd ad-Din Abi Salamah Murshid (1068–1137) became the emir of Shaizar and the surrounding cities. However, he soon gave up his position to Usama's uncle, Izz ad-Din Abi al-Asaker Sultan, since Murshid was more interested in studying religion and hunting than in matters of politics.

While Usama's uncle's rule, Shaizar was attacked numerous times by the Banu Kilab of Aleppo, the sect of the Hashshashin, the Byzantines, and the crusaders. It was struck with siege engines for 10 days in 1137 by the Byzantines and the crusaders attempted on many occasions to storm it. However, due to its natural fortifications, it never fell.

As a child, Usama was the second of four boys and raised by his nurse, Lu'lu'a, who had also raised his father and would later raise Usama's own children. He was encouraged by his father to memorise the Quran, and was also tutored by scholars such as Ibn Munira of Kafartab and Abu Abdullah al-Tulaytuli of Toledo. He spent much of his youth hunting with his family, partly as recreation and certainly as warrior (faris), training for battle as part of furusiyya. He also gathered much direct fighting experience, against the neighbouring crusader County of Tripoli and Principality of Antioch, hostile Muslim neighbours in Hama, Homs, and elsewhere, and against the Hashshashin who had established a base near Shaizar. According to Usama, his first experience in battle took place in 1119, in a raid on the crusaders at Apamea.

Sultan did not initially have any male heirs and it is possible that Usama expected to succeed him. He certainly singled him out among his brothers by teaching him, tutoring him in the ways of war and hunting. He even favoured him for personal missions and as a representative. However, after Sultan had his own son, he no longer appreciated the presence of Usama and Murshid's other sons. According to Usama, Sultan became jealous after a particularly successful lion-hunt in 1131, when Usama entered the town with a large lion head in his arms as a hunting trophy. When his grandmother saw this she warned him about the effect this could have on his uncle. Despite this, he still spoke well of his uncle on a few occasions in his autobiography and highlighted his noble actions. Usama ultimately left Shaizar temporarily in 1129, and after his father death in 1137 his exile became permanent.

Usama's uncle died in 1154 and his son, Taj al-Dawla Nasr ad-Din Muhammad, inherited the castle. However, Usama was the last heir of the line left alive when in 1157 an earthquake struck the area, killing most of his family.

== Damascus and Egypt ==
Usama went to Homs, where he was taken captive in a battle against Zengi, the atabeg of Mosul and Aleppo, who had just captured nearby Hama. After his capture he entered Zengi's service, and travelled throughout northern Syria, Iraq, and Armenia fighting against Zengi's enemies, including the Abbasid caliph outside Baghdad in 1132. In 1135, he returned to the south, to Hama, where one of Zengi's generals, al-Yaghisiyani, was appointed governor. He returned to Shaizar when his father died in May 1137, and again in April 1138 when Byzantine emperor John II Comnenus besieged the city.

The emperor's siege of Shaizar was unsuccessful, but Shaizar was heavily damaged. After the siege, Usama left Zengi's service and went to Damascus, which was ruled by Mu'in ad-Din Unur, the atabeg of the Burid dynasty. Zengi was determined to conquer Damascus, so Usama and Unur turned to the crusader Kingdom of Jerusalem for help. Usama was sent on a preliminary visit to Jerusalem in 1138, and in 1139 Zengi captured Baalbek in Damascene territory. In 1140, Unur sent Usama back to Jerusalem to conclude a treaty with the crusaders, and both he and Unur visited their new allies numerous times between 1140 and 1143. During these diplomatic missions Usama developed a friendship with members of the Knights Templar whom he considered more civilized than other crusader orders. Afterwards, Usama was suspected of being involved in a plot against Unur, and he fled Damascus for Fatimid Cairo in November 1144.

In Cairo he became a wealthy courtier, but he was involved in plots and conspiracies there as well. The young az-Zafir became caliph in 1149, and Ibn as-Sallar became vizier, with Usama as one of his advisors. As-Sallar sent Usama to negotiate an alliance against the crusaders with Zengi's son Nur ad-Din, but the negotiations failed. Usama took part in battles with the crusaders outside of Ascalon on his way back to Egypt, and after he left, his brother 'Ali was killed at Gaza.

Back in Egypt, as-Sallar was assassinated in 1153 by his son Abbas, Abbas's son Nasr, and caliph az-Zafir, who, according to Usama, was Nasr's lover. Thirteenth-century historian Ibn al-Athir says that Usama was the instigator of this plot. Usama may also have been behind the assassination of az-Zafir by Abbas, in 1154. Az-Zafir's relatives called upon a supporter, Tala'i ibn Ruzzik, who chased Abbas out of Cairo, and Usama followed him. He lost his possessions in Cairo, and on the way to Damascus his retinue was attacked by the crusaders and Bedouin nomads, but in June 1154 he safely reached Damascus, which had recently been captured by Nur ad-Din. Ibn Ruzzik tried to persuade him to come back, as the rest of his family was still in Cairo, but Usama was able to bring them to Damascus, through crusader territory, in 1156. The crusaders promised to transport them safely, but they were attacked and pillaged, and Usama lost his entire library.

== Later years ==
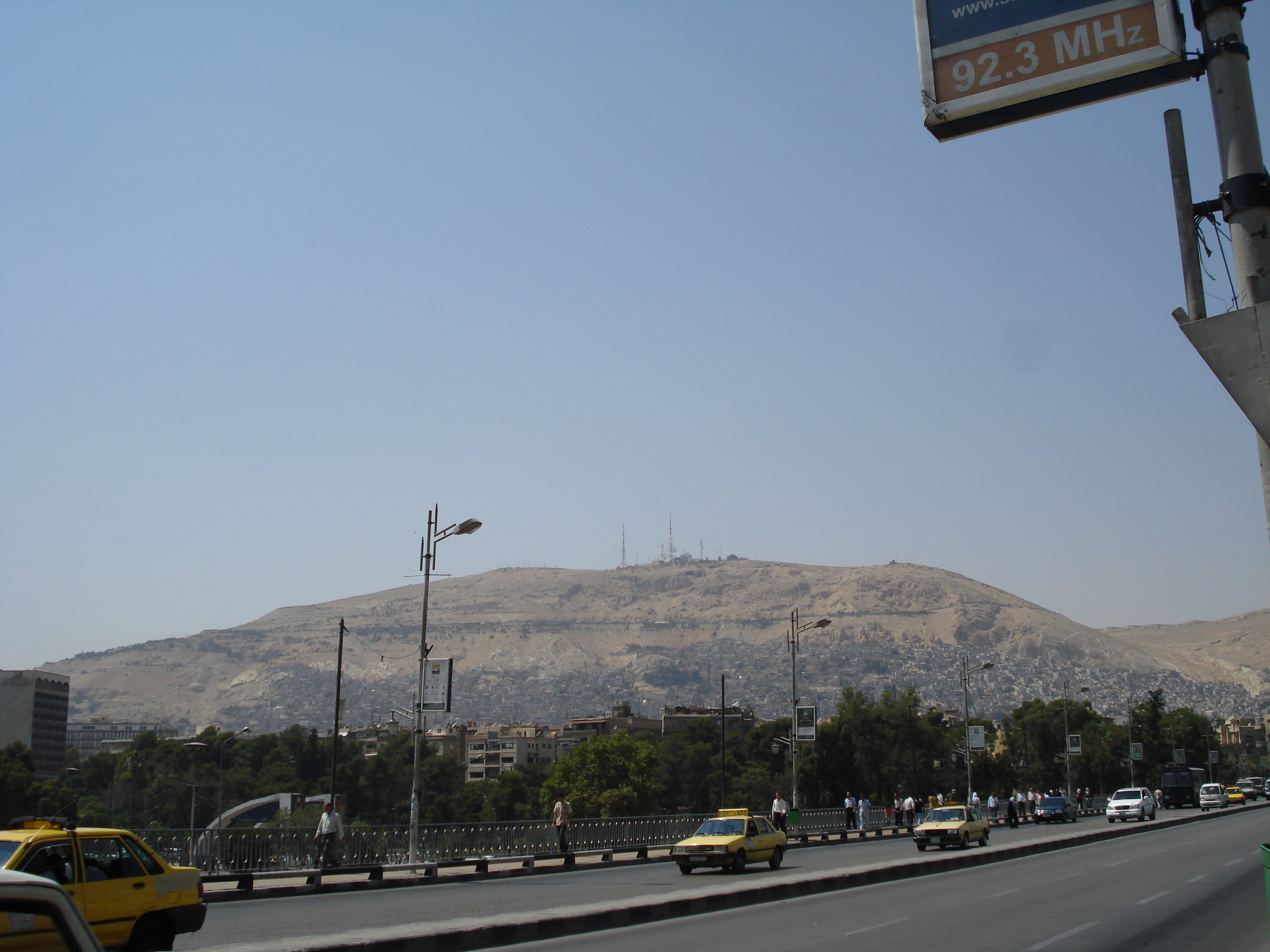
Mount Qasiyun in Damascus, where Usama was buried.

In 1157, Shaizar was destroyed by an earthquake, killing almost all of Usama's relatives. They were there for the circumcision of the son of his cousin Muhammad, who had recently succeeded Sultan as emir. The only survivor was Muhammad's wife. Usama had remained in Damascus, and after the destruction of his homeland he remained there in semi-retirement. He went on pilgrimage to Mecca in 1160, then went on campaign against the crusaders with Nur ad-Din in 1162, and was at the Battle of Harim in 1164. That year, Usama left Nur ad-Din's service and went north to the court of Kara Arslan, the Artuqid emir of Hisn Kayfa.

Usama's life in Hisn Kayfa is very obscure, but he travelled throughout the region, and probably wrote many of his works there. In 1174, Usama was invited to Damascus to serve Saladin, who had succeeded Nur ad-Din earlier that year and was a friend of Usama's son Murhaf. Usama lived in semi-retirement, as he did in Hisn Kayfa, and often met with Saladin to discuss literature and warfare. He may have also taught poetry and hadith in Damascus, and held poetry salons for Saladin and his chief men, including al-Qadi al-Fadil and Imad ad-Din al-Isfahani. He died on 17 November 1188. He was buried in Damascus on Mount Qasiyun, although the tomb is now lost.

== Family ==
Usama had three brothers, Muhammad, 'Ali, and Munqidh; his cousin, also named Muhammad, succeeded Usama's uncle Sultan as emir of Shaizar. He had a son, Murhaf, in 1126, and another son, Abu Bakr, who died as a child. He had a daughter, Umm Farwa, in Hisn Kayfa in 1166. He mentions other children, but their names, and the name of his wife or wives, are unknown.

The picture he painted of his father was of a pious religious man who was not interested in the affairs of this world. He would spend most of his time reading the Quran, fasting and hunting during the day and at night would copy the Quran. He also recounted a few battles his father joined against the crusaders in his autobiography Kitab al Itibar.

== Religion ==
Usama's religious affiliation remains a subject of academic debate due to the sectarian fluidity of his era. While his family, the Banu Munqidh, cooperated with the Isma'ili Fatimids and he served in their court in Egypt, Usama frequently expressed reverence for 'Ali. Philip K. Hitti suggested Usama held a "secret sympathy" with Shi'ism. Paul M. Cobb argues the evidence is inconclusive, positing that Usama was likely a Sunni who harbored "acceptable Shi'ite tendencies" common among the Arab aristocracy of his time. Conversely, Robert Irwin contends the Banu Munqidh were Twelver Shi'ites. Irwin notes that Usama’s memoirs lack the state-sponsored ideological rhetoric of jihad championed by his contemporaries, reflecting a worldview grounded instead in traditional Arab chivalry.

Usama observed the intense physical devotion of Christian monks with fascination. He cited their rigorous asceticism as a rhetorical device to urge his fellow Muslims toward greater religious zeal. In his final years in Damascus, after retiring from a lifetime of warfare, Usama embraced asceticism and closely associated with Sufi mystics.

== Works ==
Around 1171 in Hisn Kayfa, Usama wrote the Kitab al-'Asa ("Book of the Staff"), a poetry anthology about famous walking sticks and other staffs, and al-Manazil wa'l-Diyar ("Dwellings and Abodes"). In Damascus in the early 1180s he wrote another anthology, the Lubab al-Adab ("Kernels of Refinement"), instructions on living a properly cultured life. He is most famous for the Kitab al-I'tibar (translated various ways, most recently as the Book of Contemplation), which was written as a gift to Saladin around 1183. It is not exactly a "memoir", as Philip Hitti translated the title, although it does include many autobiographical details that are incidental to the main point. It was meant to be "a book of examples ('ibar) from which to draw lessons."

In 1880, Hartwig Derenbourg was the first to discover the Kitab al-I'tibar, which survived in only one manuscript, in the possession of the Escorial Monastery near Madrid. Derenbourg was also the first to produce an Arabic edition (1886), a biography of Usama (1889), and a French translation (1895). In 1930, Hitti produced an improved Arabic edition, and an English translation. Qasim as-Samarrai produced another Arabic edition in 1987.

Usama wrote in "Middle Arabic", a less formal style of classical Arabic.

== Reputation ==
Usama was known for becoming embroiled in palace intrigues and political maneuvering. As the Encyclopaedia of Islam says, "his career was a troubled one, and for this his own actions were surely responsible in large part."

To contemporary and later medieval Muslims, however, he was best remembered for his poetry and his poetry anthologies. Ibn Khallikan, author of a fourteenth-century biographical dictionary, calls him "one of the most powerful, learned, and intrepid members of the [Munqidh] family" and speaks at great length about his poetry.

He was also known for his military and hunting exploits. Ibn al-Athir described him as "the ultimate of bravery", regarding his presence at the Battle of Harim.

For modern readers he is most famous for the Kitab al-I'tibar and his descriptions of life in Syria during the early crusades. The disjointed nature of the work has given him a reputation as a senile rambler, although it is actually written with an anthological structure, with humorous or moralistic tales that are not meant to proceed chronologically, as a true autobiography would. Since this style of literature, adab in Arabic, does not necessarily have to be factual, historians are quick to point out that Usama's historical material cannot always be trusted. Usama's anecdotes about the crusades are sometimes obvious jokes, exaggerating their "otherness" to entertain his Muslim audience. As Carole Hillenbrand wrote, it would be "dangerously misleading to take the evidence of his book at its face value."

== Bibliography ==
=== Editions and translations of Usama's works ===
- Ousama ibn Mounkidh, un emir Syrien au premier siècle des croisades (1095–1188), ed. Hartwig Derenbourg. Paris, 1889.
- ibn Munqidh, Usama (1895). Souvenirs historiques et récits de chasse (in French). Hartwig Derenbourg (translator). Paris: E. Leroux.
- ibn Munqidh, Usama (1905). Memoiren eines syrischen Emirs aus der Zeit der Kreuzzüge (in German). Georg Schumann (translator). Innsbruck: Wagner'schen Universitäts -Buchhandlung.
- ibn Munqidh, Usama (1929). An Arab-Syrian Gentleman And Warrior in The Period of The Crusades: Memoirs of Usama Ibn-Munqidh (Kitab al i'tibar). Philip K. Hitti (translator). New York: Columbia University Press.
- Memoirs Entitled Kitāb al-I'tibār, ed. Philip K. Hitti (Arabic text). Princeton: Princeton University Press, 1930.
- Lubab al-Adab, ed. A. M. Shakir. Cairo: Maktabat Luwis Sarkis, 1935.
- Diwan Usama ibn Munqidh, ed. A. Badawi and H. Abd al-Majid. Cairo: Wizarat al-Ma'arif al-Umumiyya, 1953.
- Kitab al-Manazil wa'l-Diyar, ed. M. Hijazi. Cairo: Al-Majlis al-A'la li-l-Shu'un al-Islamiyya, 1968.
- Kitab al-'Asa, ed. Hassan Abbas. Alexandria: Al-Hay'at al-Misriyya al-'Amma li-l-Kitab, 1978.
- Al-Badi' fi-l-Badi', ed. A. Muhanna. Beirut: Dar al-Kutub al-'Ilmiyya, 1987.
- Kitab al i'tibar, ed. Qasim as-Samarra'i. Riyadh, 1987.
- "Usama ibn Munqidh's Book of the Staff (Kitab al'Asa): autobiographical and historical excerpts," trans. Paul M. Cobb. Al-Masaq: Islam and the Medieval Mediterranean 17 (2005).
- "Usama ibn Munqidh's Kernels of Refinement (Lubab al-Adab): autobiographical and historical excerpts," trans. Paul M. Cobb. Al-Masaq: Islam and the Medieval Mediterranean 18 (2006)
- The Book of Contemplation: Islam and the Crusades, trans. Paul M. Cobb. Penguin Classics, 2008.

=== Secondary works ===
- Ibn Khallikan's Biographical Dictionary, trans. William MacGuckin, Baron de Slane, vol. 1. Paris, 1842.
- Hassan Abbas, Usama ibn Munqidh: Hayatuhu wa-Atharuhu. Cairo: al-Hay'a al-Misriya al-'Ama li'l-Kitab, 1981.
- Adam M. Bishop, "Usama ibn Munqidh and crusader law in the twelfth century." Crusades 12 (2013), pp. 53–65.
- Niall Christie, "Just a bunch of dirty stories? Women in the memoirs of Usamah ibn Munqidh." Eastward Bound: Travel and Travellers, 1050–1550, ed. Rosamund Allen. Manchester: Manchester University Press, 2004, pp. 71–87.
- Paul M. Cobb, Usama ibn Munqidh: Warrior-Poet in the Age of Crusades Oxford: Oneworld, 2005.
- Paul M. Cobb, "Infidel dogs: hunting crusaders with Usamah ibn Munqidh." Crusades 6 (2007).
- Lawrence I. Conrad, "Usama ibn Munqidh and other witnesses to Frankish and Islamic medicine in the era of the crusades." Medicine in Jerusalem throughout the Ages, ed. Zohar Amar et al. Tel Aviv: C. G. Foundation, 1999.
- Carole Hillenbrand, The Crusades: Islamic Perspectives. Routledge, 2000.
- R. S. Humphreys, Munkidh, Banu. Encyclopaedia of Islam, 2nd. ed., vol. VII (Leiden: Brill, 1960–2002).
- Robert Irwin, "Usama ibn Munqidh: an Arab-Syrian gentleman at the time of the Crusades reconsidered." The Crusades and their sources: essays presented to Bernard Hamilton ed. John France, William G. Zajac (Aldershot: Ashgate, 1998) pp. 71–87.
- Adnan Husain, "Wondrous Crusade Encounters: Usamah ibn Munqidh's Book of Learning by Example," in Jason Glenn (ed), The Middle Ages in Texts and Texture: Reflections on Medieval Sources (Toronto, University of Toronto, 2012),
- D. W. Morray, "The genius of Usamah ibn Munqidh: aspects of Kitab al-I'tibar by Usamah ibn Munqidh." Working Paper. University of Durham, Centre for Middle Eastern and Islamic Studies, Durham, 1987.
- I. Schen, "Usama ibn Munqidh's Memoirs: some further light on Muslim Middle Arabic." Journal of Semitic Studies 17 (1972), and Journal of Semitic Studies 18 (1973).
- Bogdan C. Smarandache, "Re-examining Usama Ibn Munqidh's knowledge of "Frankish": A case study of medieval bilingualism during the crusades." The Medieval Globe 3 (2017), pp. 47–85.
- G. R. Smith, "A new translation of certain passages of the hunting section of Usama ibn Munqidh's I'tibar." Journal of Semitic Studies 26 (1981).
- Stefan Wild, "Open questions, new light: Usama ibn Munqidh's account of his battles against Muslims and Franks." The Frankish Wars and their Influence on Palestine, edd. Khalil Athamina and Roger Heacock (Birzeit, 1994), pp. 9–29.
- The Chronicle of Ibn al-Athir for the Crusading Period from al-Kamil i'l-Ta'rikh, Part 2: The Years 541–589/1146–1193: The Age of Nur al-Din and Saladin, trans. D.S. Richards. Crusade Texts in Translation 15. Aldershot: Ashgate, 2007.
