= Banu Munqidh =

Syrian Arab family

- Emirs
- Country: Mirdasid Emirate (1025–1080); Seljuk Empire (1080–1127); Zengid Atabegate (1127–1157)
- Founded: 1025
- Founder: Muqallad ibn Nasr ibn Munqidh al-Kinani
- Final ruler: Muhammad ibn Sultan
- Dissolution: 1157

The Banu Munqidh (Arabic: بنو منقذ, romanized: Banū Munqidh), also referred to as the Munqidhites, were an Arab family that ruled an emirate in the Orontes Valley in northern Syria from the mid-11th century until the family's demise in an earthquake in 1157. The emirate was initially based in Kafartab before the Banu Munqidh took over the fortress of Shayzar in 1081 and made it their headquarters for the remainder of their rule. The capture of Shayzar was the culmination of a long, drawn-out process beginning with the Banu Munqidh's nominal assignment to the land by the Mirdasid emir of Aleppo in 1025, and accelerating with the weakened grip of Byzantine rule in northern Syria in the 1070s.

Under the reign of Emir Ali ibn Muqallad (r. 1059–1082), the Banu Munqidh reached their territorial peak with the emirate extending from the Mediterranean port of Latakia to Apamea. The Seljuk conquest of Syria in 1085 and subsequent struggles with local Muslim lords reduced the Munqidh emirate to Shayzar and its environs. Under Emir Sultan ibn Ali (r. 1098–1154), the Banu Munqidh alternated between combating the Crusaders who landed in Syria in 1099 and paying tribute to them. During this period, the family also had to contend with Ismai'li newcomers encroaching on their domains. To firmly protect the emirate, Sultan ultimately put the Banu Munqidh under Zengid suzerainty. After the death of Emir Muhammad ibn Sultan (r. 1154–1157) and his family in the 1157 earthquake, the emirate passed to the Zengid emir Nur al-Din, who granted it to the Banu al-Daya family.

Through a combination of wealth, diplomatic acumen and military skills, the Banu Munqidh survived as a local power and successfully resisted attempts by the Crusaders and stronger Syrian Muslim dynasties to seize their strategic fortress in Shayzar. Among their allies and enemies alike, the Banu Munqidh gained a reputation for "martial valor, honor, piety and courtly refinement" in the words of historian Adnan Husain. Their rural lands, which were largely populated by Greek Orthodox Christians, were distinguished for their well-kept and prosperous state. From early on, the family was also known to provide refuge for a wide array of people, ranging from Muslim refugees fleeing Crusader assaults or exiled Muslim generals, officials and other dignitaries. The best-known member of the family, Usama ibn Munqidh (1095–1188), went on to have a proficient career in literature and diplomacy, serving the courts of the Fatimids, Zengids and Artuqids. He and a number of his Munqidhite kinsmen ultimately served the Ayyubid sultans as governors, administrators or envoys in the late 12th and early 13th centuries.

== History ==
=== Emergence ===
The Banu Munqidh were an Arab family belonging to the Kinana branch of the Banu Kalb tribe. Although the Banu Kalb were largely concentrated around Damascus in the late 10th century, the Kinana inhabited the eastern environs of the Orontes River in northern Syria. A member of the family, Ali ibn Munqidh ibn Nasr al-Kinani, is first mentioned in c. 960 when he was taken captive by the Byzantines during an attack against the Hamdanid rulers of northern Syria in which the prominent Hamdanid poet and governor Abu Firas al-Hamdani was also captured.

It was not until the 11th century that the Banu Munqidh emerged in regional politics. At that time, the family entered the service of Salih ibn Mirdas, founder of the Aleppo-based Mirdasid dynasty. According to the historian Suhayl Zakkar, the Banu Munqidh were numerous and strong enough at the time to "play an influential role in the life of the Mirdasid dynasty". Upon capturing Aleppo in 1025, Salih granted the Munqhidite chieftain, Muqallad ibn Nasr ibn Munqidh, the lands around Shayzar as an iqṭāʿ (land tax grant; plural: iqṭāʿat); the town of Shayzar itself was in Byzantine hands, however. With their assignment to Shayzar being in name only, the Banu Munqidh instead used Kafartab as their headquarters.

=== Reign of Ali ===
Muqallad died in 1059, after which his son Sadid al-Mulk Ali inherited his iqṭāʿ. Tensions with the Mirdasid emir of Aleppo, Mahmud ibn Nasr, led Ali to depart Aleppo for Tripoli. The historian Thierry Bianquis notes that Ali afterward "was able to carve out for himself, to the detriment of the [Banu] Kilab, a lordship over the middle Orontes [valley]." The Banu Kilab were the Bedouin tribe to which the Mirdasids belonged, and a branch of the tribe, the Ja'far, dwelt in the middle Orontes. During the chaotic succession process following Mahmud's death, Ali was instrumental in installing Mahmud's son Sabiq as Aleppo's emir in 1076. However, Sabiq's succession was opposed by other Mirdasids and the Banu Kilab, who favored Sabiq's brother Waththab. After a number of major battles between the opposing sides and amid severe famine in Aleppo, Muslim ibn Quraysh, the Uqaylid emir of Mosul saw an opportunity to take the city. In the aftermath of his entry into Aleppo in 1080 and the refusal of the Mirdasids to surrender the citadel, Ali intervened to mediate between the two sides. Ultimately, Ali facilitated the city's surrender to Ibn Quraysh in return for the allotment of iqṭāʿat to the Mirdasids in Aleppo's hinterland.

==== Struggle for Shayzar ====
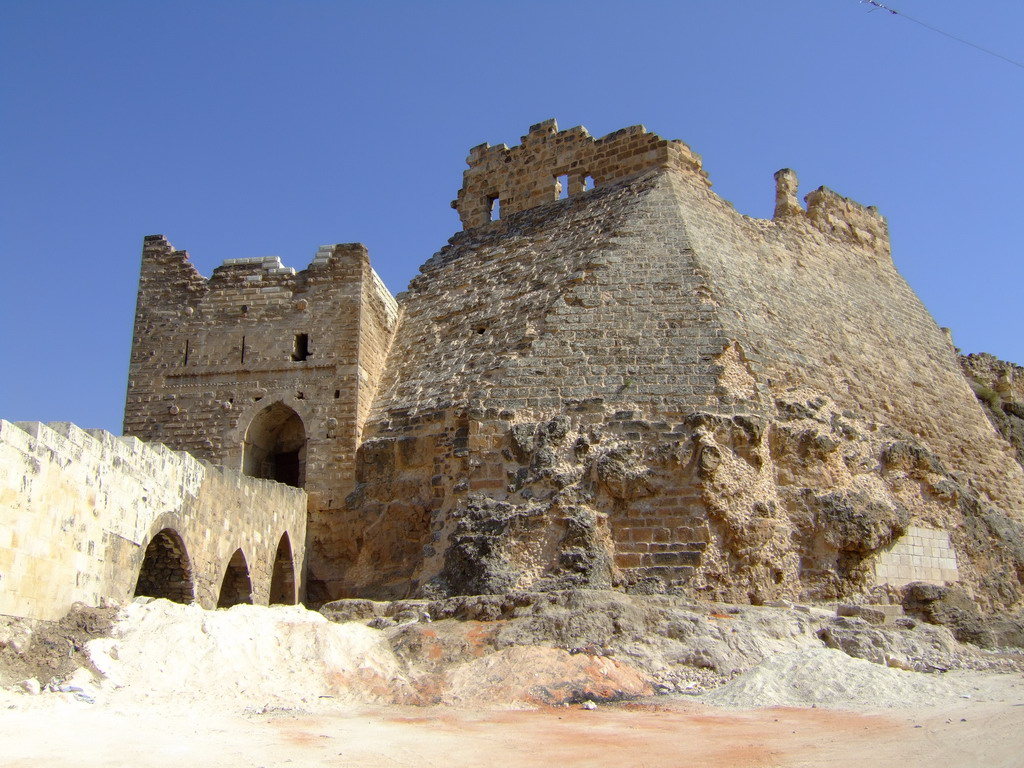
The fortress of Shayzar became the headquarters of the Banu Munqidh between 1080 until the citadel's collapse and the family's consequent demise in the 1157 earthquake

Meanwhile, the Banu Munqidh led renewed efforts to capture the Shayzar fortress in what historian Hugh N. Kennedy described as a "long, drawn out process". The catalyst of these efforts was the weakening grip of the Byzantines in northern Syria following their defeat by the Seljuk Sultanate at the Battle of Manzikert in 1071. In 1076, Ali began the construction of the Hisn al-Jisr fortress, which would limit Shayzar's access to the Orontes River. Hisn al-Jisr was used to hamper the flow of supplies into Shayzar from the Byzantine mainland. At the time, it was also utilized by Ali for diplomatic efforts amid the struggle for Syria between the ascendant Seljuks and their opponents. In 1078/79, he sheltered the families of the Seljuks' Turkish opponents from Aleppo and he hosted the Seljuk general Afshin, persuading him to spare both Kafartab and Byzantine Shayzar from his pillaging. These were early demonstrations of how "diplomatic skills, more than military power, enabled the Banu Munqidh to maintain their precarious independence", according to Kennedy.

The Banu Munqidh's pressure on Shayzar compelled its Byzantine rulers to surrender the fortress to Ali in December 1081 in exchange for an unknown sum and guarantees of upkeep of the local bishop's home. Shayzar became the center of the Munqidhite emirate (principality). The family under Ali soon after faced a siege by the Uqaylids but leveraged their significant wealth to settle with Ibn Quraysh. By the time of Ali's death in 1082, the Munqidhite emirate extended to the Mediterranean port town of Latakia and included Apamea and a few smaller places, in addition to Shayzar and Kafartab.

=== Reign of Nasr ===
Ali was succeeded by his son Nasr. The principal challenge the Banu Munqidh faced during Nasr's reign was the expansion of Seljuk rule into Syria. Like during their previous encounter with the Uqaylids, the family employed the same strategy of paying a large sum of money to stave off an attack by the Seljuk ruler Sulayman ibn Qutulmush in 1085. Moreover, Nasr's conviction that the Seljuks could not be defeated led him to cede his family's territories in Latakia, Apamea and Kafartab to the sultanate in exchange for their firm recognition of the Banu Munqidh's possession of Shayzar in 1086/87. Through his good offices with the Seljuk ruler of Aleppo, Aq Sunqur al-Hajib, he was able to return the ceded towns to the Banu Munqidh in 1091. However, in 1096 Apamea and Kafartab were lost to the family's Arab rival, Khalaf ibn Mula'ib, the formerly semi-independent lord of Homs. Ibn Mula'ib was a former subordinate of Nasr who he gradually had to contend with as a frequently hostile neighbor of the Banu Munqidh. In one encounter, Nasr was badly defeated in an ambush by Ibn Mula'ib during an attack outside Shayzar.

=== Reign of Sultan ===
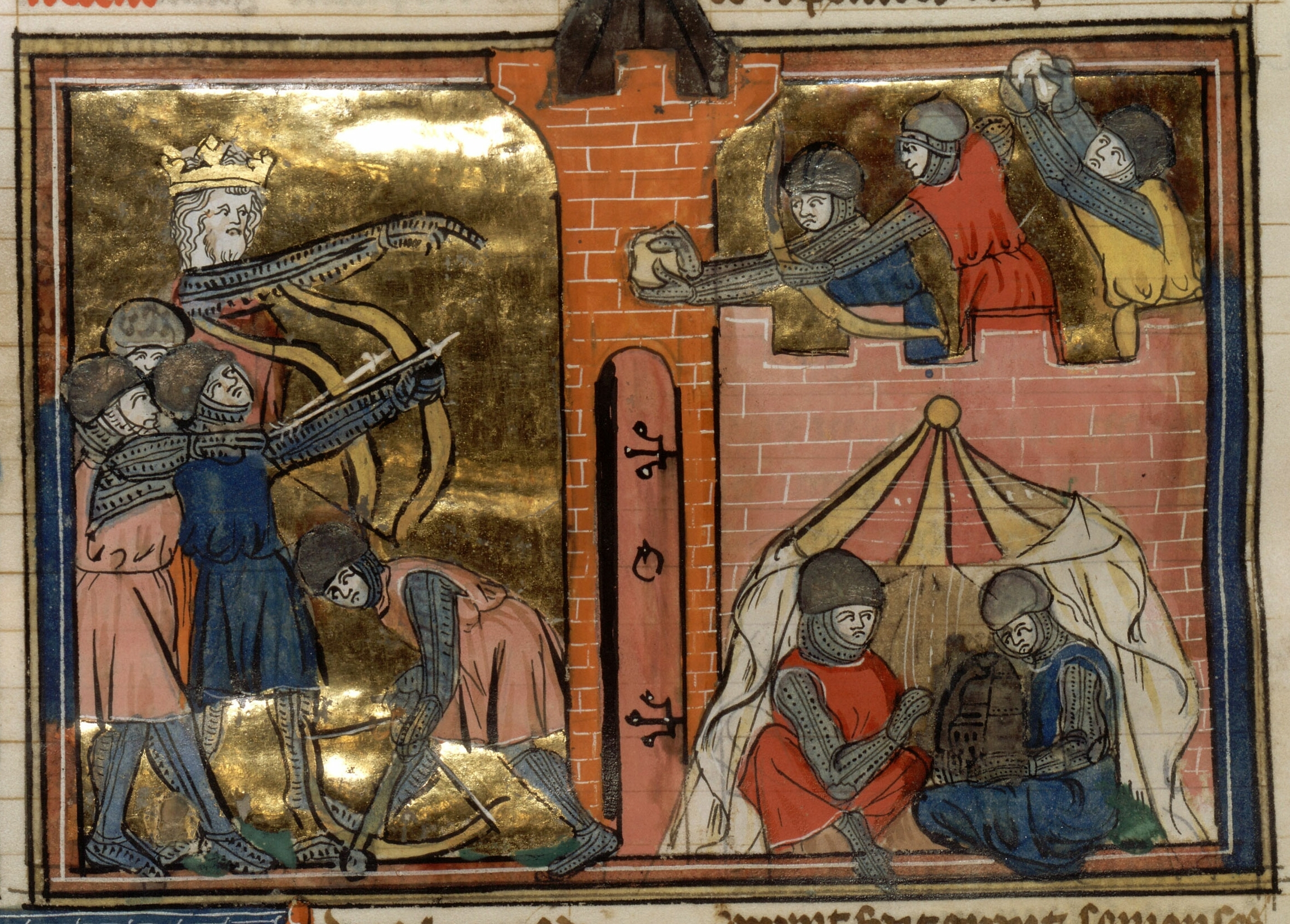
Depiction of John II's Byzantine-Crusader coalition siege of Shayzar in 1138, French manuscript 1338.

In 1098, Nasr died and the lordship of Shayzar passed to his brothers. For unknown reasons, Nasr's brother and chosen successor, Murshid, withdrew himself from the line of succession in favor of his younger brother Sultan, who had served as the Banu Munqidh's governor in Latakia. Murshid maintained a prominent leadership role as his then-childless brother's deputy. At the turn of the 11th century, the Banu Munqidh's possessions were under threat not only by their Turkish suzerains, but also the encroachments of the Banu Kilab, the growing presence of the Nizari Ismailis in the coastal mountains of northern Syria and the newly arrived Crusaders.

During Sultan's reign, the Banu Munqidh had become more numerous and Sultan chiefly depended on his own kinsmen in confrontations with the constellation of powers, local and regional, that controlled northern Syria. He could also rely on his Kinana tribesmen and the militia of Shayzar. To a much lesser extent the family recruited Kurdish mercenaries and Turkish mamluks (slave soldiers). Meanwhile, an alliance was formed with Ibn Mula'ib despite the wounding of Sultan and Murshid in a battle with him in 1104. Together, the Banu Munqidh and Ibn Mula'ib attacked a small Crusader-held fort in their region in 1106, but Ibn Mula'ib betrayed the Banu Munqidh by deserting and stealing their horses. Before the family could retaliate, Ibn Mula'ib was killed by an Ismai'il assassin. At this time, friendly relations were also established with the family's other erstwhile rivals, the Turkish Ibn Qaraja emirs of Hama and Homs.

The principal Crusader threat to the Banu Munqidh was posed by the neighboring Principality of Antioch. The ruler of Antioch, Tancred attacked and plundered the Banu Munqidh's emirate in 1110 and imposed a heavy tribute on Shayzar, a testament to its wealth at the time. The following year, Tancred built the Tell Ibn Ma'shar fortress along the west bank of the Orontes, across from Shayzar, to prepare an assault against the city. Sultan reached out to Mawdud, the Seljuk ruler of Mosul, for military support, while Tancred gathered a larger Crusader coalition including the rulers of Jerusalem and Tripoli. In the ensuing Battle of Shayzar, which according to Kennedy was more of "a prolonged confrontation" than a battle, the Crusader armies retreated in October 1111. Nonetheless, the Banu Munqidh continued paying the annual tribute to Antioch.

Shayzar also became a target of the Isma'ilis subsequent to their exodus to the coastal mountains due to persecution they faced in Syria's major cities. They attempted to seize Shayzar in 1114 while the Banu Munqidh family were away participating in the Easter celebrations of their Orthodox Christian subjects. The attack was launched by the town's Isma'ili inhabitants, who had been generally well-tolerated by the Banu Munqidh. About one hundred Isma'ilis seized the citadel, expelling its residents. A bloody struggle ensued upon the Banu Munqidh's return to Shayzar, and involved the participation of the family's women. The Ismai'ili attackers were all killed by the Banu Munqidh, as well as all the Isma'ilis living in Shayzar. The family applied unspecified measures to prevent a recurrence. The following year, a Muslim–Crusader coalition composed of Roger of Antioch, Toghtekin of Damascus and Ilghazi of Mardin besieged Shayzar in response to the plans of the Banu Munqidh's ally Mawdud of Mosul to conquer Syria.

==== Suzerainty of the Zengids ====
In 1127 Sultan put the Banu Munqidh under the suzerainty of the ascendant Muslim ruler of Mosul and Aleppo, founder of the Zengid dynasty Imad al-Din, which allowed for a greater level of security for the family's domains. This was interrupted by a short siege of Shayzar by the Imad al-Din's principal Muslim rival, the Burid ruler of Damascus Shams al-Mulk Isma'il, in 1133 and a greater crisis by the Byzantine–Crusader siege of Shayzar in 1138 led by John II Komnenos. The Byzantine-led army initially attacked the Banu Munqidh-held forts of Kafartab and Hisn al-Jisr, causing their inhabitants to flee, before proceeding in their assault against Shayzar. Arabic and Greek sources both indicate that the Banu Munqidh and the people of Shayzar resisted the siege and the Byzantines' catapults for several days before John II's army withdrew. However, the Arabic sources claim the Byzantines left after hearing of the arrival of Zengid reinforcements, while the Greek sources claim the withdrawal was precipitated by a Zengid attack on Edessa and Sultan's offer to pay off John II.

The domain of the Banu Munqidh entered a long period of stability and prosperity beginning in 1138. Shayzar and it's dependencies remained under the control of Sultan who ruled under the authority of the Zengid dynasty. However, in 1140/41 the Ismai'ils captured the fortress of Masyaf from the Banu Munqidh, who had purchased it in 1127/28. It thereafter became the Isma'ilis' main stronghold in Syria. This generally peaceful period also coincided with tensions between Sultan and his nephews. Murshid's position as the Banu Munqidh's second highest-ranking leader enabled the latter's sons, including Usama, to rise politically within the emirate. They gained a reputation for their martial and diplomatic skills and Sultan viewed their prominence as a threat to his leadership. These tensions culminated after Murshid's death in 1136/37 and the birth of Sultan's son Taj al-Mulk Muhammad in the following year. As a consequence, Usama and his brothers were exiled from Shayzar, finding asylum with Nur al-Din, the Zengid emir of Aleppo. After Sultan's death in 1154, Taj al-Mulk Muhammad succeeded him without incident.

=== Demise and surviving members ===
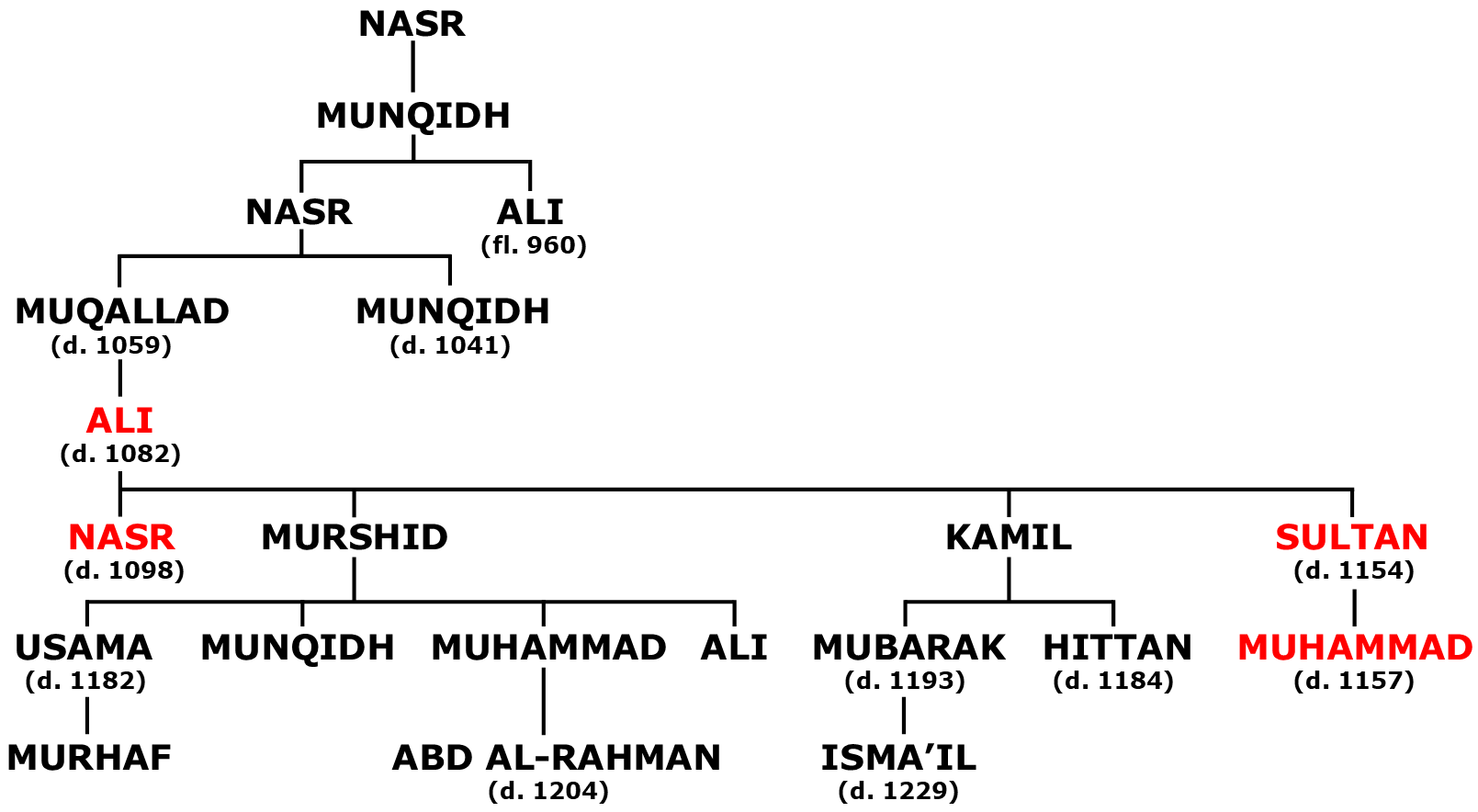
Family tree of the Banu Munqidh, with the emirs of Shayzar in red

Taj al-Mulk, his children, and all members of the Banu Munqidh present in Shayzar, except for Taj al-Dawla's wife, died in the collapse of the Shayzar citadel during the August 1157 earthquake, which devastated a number of other towns in the area. This brought an end to their rule of the Shayzar principality, which was soon after seized by Nur al-Din to prevent its capture by the Crusaders. Nur al-Din did not seek to find any surviving members of the Banu Munqidh to resume their lordship of Shayzar, whose fortifications he had promptly restored. Instead, he handed the town over to a certain Sabiq al-Din Uthman ibn al-Daya. The latter's family, the Banu al-Daya, remained the lords of Shayzar through Ayyubid rule until 1233.

Among those of the Banu Munqidh who were not present during the earthquake was Usama, who became the best known member of the family. He left the Zengids' service in 1164 to work for the Artuqids of Hisn Kayfa, where he remained for ten years. Afterward, through his son Murhaf's good offices with the Ayyubid sultan Saladin, who had taken over Damascus in 1174, he entered the latter's service. By 1176 Usama was forced into retirement, during which time he composed his anthology Lubab al-adab and memoirs, Kitab al-I'tibar, the latter of which is an important historical source for the Crusades.

Usama's nephew Abd al-Rahman ibn Muhammad (d. 1201) served as Saladin's envoy to the Almohad Caliphate in the Maghreb. Usama's cousins Mubarak ibn Kamil ibn Ali and Hittan ibn Kamil ibn Ali had been part of Saladin's administration in Egypt. In 1174 the two brothers accompanied the Ayyubid emir Turan Shah in the conquest of Yemen, where they each successively served as governors of Zabid. While Mubarak returned to Egypt and served in a high-ranking administrative position until his death in 1193, Hittan was ultimately executed in 1183/84 for the harshness of his rule and conflicts with other Ayyubid lieutenant governors in Yemen. Mubarak's son Jamal al-Din Isma'il served in the governments of the Ayyubid sultans al-Adil (r. 1200–1218) and al-Kamil (r. 1218–1238). He died shortly after being appointed governor of Harran in 1229.

== Diplomacy and social relations ==
=== Relations with the Crusaders ===
The Banu Munqidh initially reacted to the Crusader invasion of coastal Syria by offering the Crusaders in early 1099 a tributary arrangement, the provisioning of food supplies, and protection for Christian pilgrims passing through the family's territory. Shortly after, when the Crusaders encamped along the Orontes near Shayzar, Sultan, alarmed at their proximity to his fortress, threatened to ban trade with them unless they withdrew further south. He sent them two guides who led them southward to a valley where they could plunder. The accord with the newly arrived Crusaders in Ma'arrat al-Nu'man spared Shayzar the Crusaders' devastating raids. Intermittent warfare in the form of raids and clashes partly characterized the contact between the Banu Munqidh and the Crusader states, but they largely maintained practical ties. In 1108, a large annual tribute was imposed by the Crusaders on the Banu Munqidh.

In addition to the financial sums, they also had to provide guides for the emissaries of the neighboring Principality of Antioch on their way to Jerusalem. The family was particularly close to King Baldwin II of Jerusalem (r. 1118–1131) and hosted him in Shayzar in 1124 at the request of his Muslim captor and ruler of Aleppo, Timurtash, son of Ilghazi, during negotiations for Baldwin II's release. Sultan and Murshid successfully mediated the ransom for Baldwin II's freedom. Subsequent to his release, Baldwin II relieved the Banu Munqidh of their tribute and services in appreciation of their generosity. The bonds forged between the Banu Munqidh and Baldwin II enabled Usama ibn Munqidh to play a mediating role in the diplomatic negotiations of the early 1130s between Baldwin II and Taj al-Muluk Buri, the Burid ruler of Damascus in whose court Usama served.

=== Relations with Muslim states and lordships ===
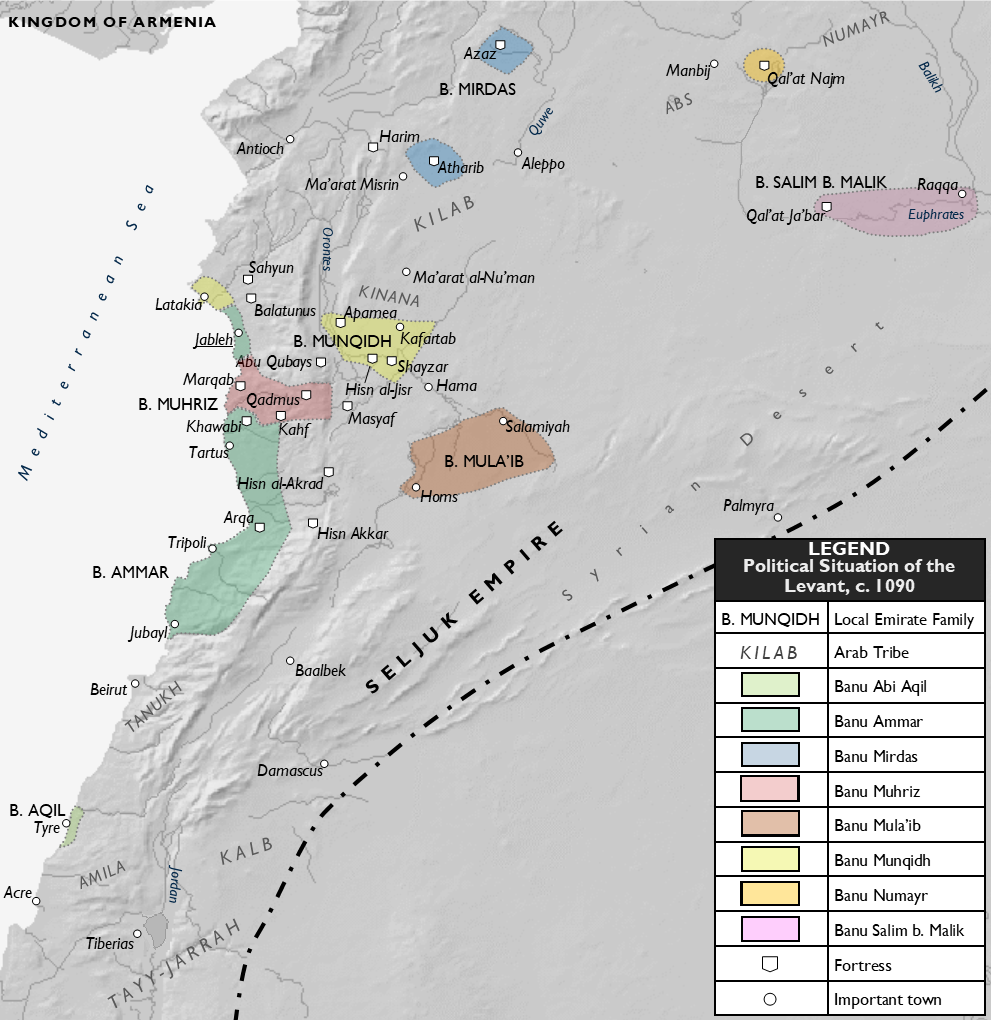
Political map of the Levant, c. 1090, during the territorial peak of the Munqidhite emirate (shaded in yellow)

Despite generally peaceful relations with the Crusaders, the Banu Munqidh remained loyal to their Muslim suzerains, fighting alongside the Muslim rulers of Aleppo and Damascus in their battles and campaigns against the Crusaders in 1111, 1115 and 1119. The family also fended off Crusader attacks against their domains between 1122 and 1124. The family maintained friendly ties with a number of the semi-independent Muslim lords of other fortress towns who shared their social standing, including the Fatimid lord Iftikhar al-Dawla of Abu Qubays and the Banu Salim ibn Malik family of Qal'at Ja'bar. The former's sister was married to Sultan and the emirs of Qal'at Ja'bar shared similar Arab tribal origins as the Banu Munqidh. The Banu Munqidh's emirs paid visits to Iftikhar al-Dawla, while keeping frequent contact with Shihab al-Din Salim ibn Malik via letters, couriers, and the exchange of gifts. The emirs of Qal'at Ja'bar played a similar diplomatic role as the Banu Munqidh and both families were described in the anonymous Syriac Chronicle of 1234 as "a good sort of people, friendly to all and good mediators at any time".

=== Provision of asylum ===
The Banu Munqidh often provided asylum for refugees and exiles. In 1041, they gave temporary refuge in Kafartab to the Fatimid governor of Syria, Anushtakin al-Dizbari, when he was ousted from Damascus and then escorted him safely to the Citadel of Aleppo. Al-Dizbari had been denied refuge in Hama and was escorted to Kafartab by Muqallad and 2,000 of his men. The size of Muqallad's force was indicative of the Banu Munqidh's size and power at the time, according to Zakkar. Later, in the Crusader era, the Banu Munqidh gave refuge to Muslim families fleeing the siege of Ma'arrat al-Nu'man in 1098; the son of their erstwhile rival Khalaf ibn Mula'ib of Apamea in 1106; the ousted Muslim ruler of Tripoli, qadi Fakhr al-Mulk ibn Ammar, in 1109; and the Isma'ili da'i of Aleppo, Ibrahim, when the Assassins fled Seljuk persecution by Alp Arslan al-Akhras in 1113.

=== Recreation ===
Usama ibn Munqidh's accounts show the family were avid hunters and went on expeditions in the wetlands of the Orontes valley west of Shayzar and in the hills south of the city. The expeditions were led by the heads of the family, who led retinues containing tens of horsemen, including relatives and mamluks. Equipped with various birds of prey, dogs, and cheetahs, they hunted francolin, waterfowl, hares, wild boars and partridges. However, the ultimate prey of the Munqidhite emirs were lions and leopards, the slaying of which were an apparent symbol and function of the emir's authority. According to Kennedy, "killing lions and leopards" was "one of the ways" an emir "demonstrated his protection of and care for the people who lived on his lands".

== Assessment ==
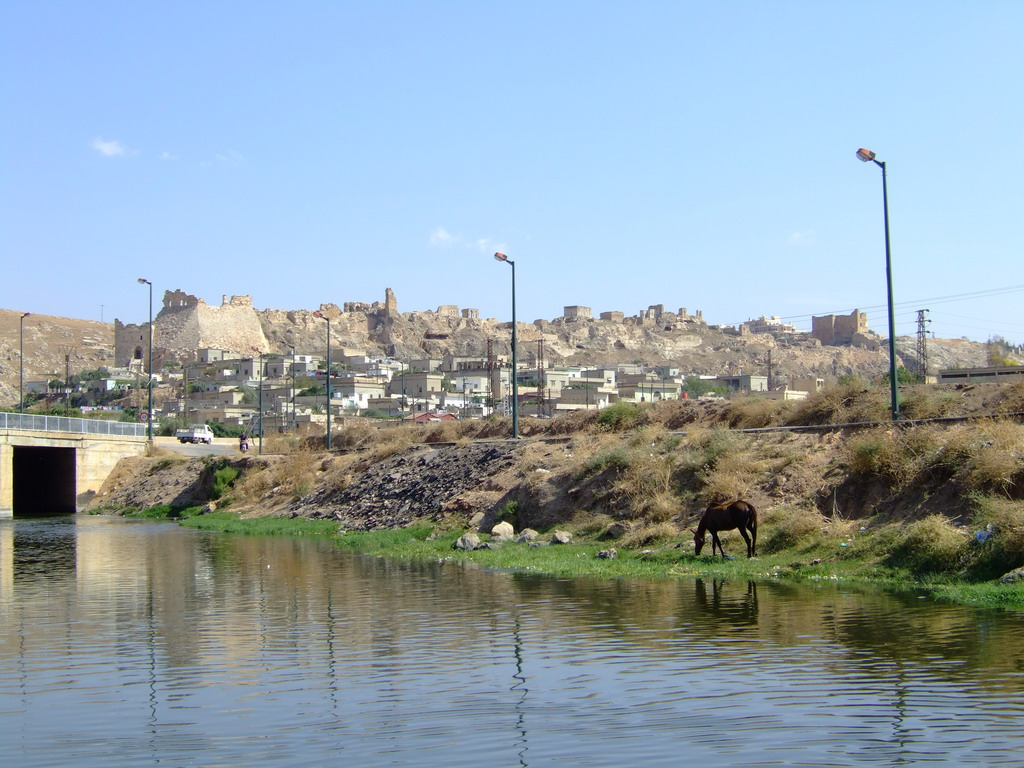
The fortress and modern town of Shayzar along the Orontes River

The Banu Munqidh were described as an "elite, patrician family of well-known warriors who enjoyed a wide reputation for martial valor, honor, piety, and courtly refinement" by historian Adnan Husain. From the citadel of Shayzar, perched on a rocky hilly enveloped by the Orontes River, the Banu Munqidh ruled a relatively a small emirate largely inhabited by Greek Orthodox Christians. Throughout their rule, their emirate was surrounded by frequently hostile powers, whether local or regional Muslim lords, Crusader principalities, or Bedouin tribes. In addition to their military abilities, the family often pursued diplomacy and alliances with their larger neighbors. Their martial skills and diplomatic maneuvers enabled their survival. According to an account of a conversation between an emissary of Roger of Antioch and Sultan in 1116, the lands of the Banu Munqidh were developed and prosperous, distinguishing them from the ruinous state of the surrounding region. This was an apparent testament to the Banu Munqidh's wealth.

== List of Banu Munqidh emirs ==
Regnal title	Kunya	Name	Reign start	Reign end	Notes
Mukhlis al-Dawla	Abu'l Mutawwaj	Muqallad ibn Nasr ibn Munqidh	1025	1059	*Granted the iqta of Shayzar by the Mirdasid emir of Aleppo Salih ibn Mirdas in 1025, but rule was confined to Kafartab.
Sadid al-Mulk	Abu'l Hasan	Ali ibn Muqallad ibn Nasr ibn Munqidh	1059	1082	*First Munqidhite emir of Shayzar.
Izz al-Dawla	Abu'l Murhaf	Nasr ibn Ali ibn Muqallad ibn Nasr ibn Munqidh	1082	1098	*Son of Ali.
Taj al-Dawla	Abu'l Asakir	Sultan ibn Ali ibn Muqallad ibn Nasr ibn Munqidh	1098	1154	*Brother of Nasr.
Taj al-Mulk		Muhammad ibn Sultan ibn Ali ibn Muqallad ibn Nasr ibn Munqidh	1154	August 1157	*Son of Sultan.

== Bibliography ==
- Bianquis, Thierry (1993). "Mirdās, Banū or Mirdāsids". In Bosworth, C. E.; van Donzel, E.; Heinrichs, W. P. & Pellat, Ch. (eds.). The Encyclopaedia of Islam, Second Edition. Volume VII: Mif–Naz. Leiden: E. J. Brill. pp. 115–123. doi:10.1163/1573-3912_islam_SIM_5220. ISBN 978-90-04-09419-2.
- Cobb, Paul M. (2005). Usama ibn Munqidh: Warrior-Poet in the Age of Crusades. Oxford: Oneworld. ISBN 9780791448809.
- De Slane, Mac Guckin, ed. (1868). Ibn Khallikan's Biographical Dictionary. London: Paris Oriental Translation Fund of Great Britain and Northern Ireland.
- Humphreys, R. Stephen (1993). "Munkidh". In Bosworth, C. E.; van Donzel, E.; Heinrichs, W. P. & Pellat, Ch. (eds.). The Encyclopaedia of Islam, Second Edition. Volume VII: Mif–Naz. Leiden: E. J. Brill. pp. 577–580. ISBN 978-90-04-09419-2.
- France, John (2016) [2013]. "Patterns of War and Peace in the Latin East: Antioch, Edessa and Aleppo, 1099–1127". In Pazos, Antón M. (ed.). Pilgrims and Pilgrimages as Peacemakers in Christianity, Judaism and Islam. Abingdon, Oxon and New York: Routledge. pp. 215–228. ISBN 978-1-40946-826-4.
- Husain, Adnan (2011). "Wondrous Crusade Encounters: Usama ibn Munqidh's Book of Learning by Example". In Glenn, Jason (ed.). The Middle Ages in Texts and Texture: Reflections on Medieval Sources. Toronto: University of Toronto Press. pp. 189–202. ISBN 978-1-4426-0490-2.
- Kennedy, Hugh N. (2012). "Shayzar: An Historical Overview of its History and the Archaeological Investigation: 1.1. An Historical Overview". In Tonghini, Cristina (ed.). Shayzar I: The Fortification of the Citadel. Leiden: Brill. pp. 2–25. ISBN 978-90-04-21736-2.
- Kohler, Michael (2013). Holt, Peter M.; Hirschler, Konrad (eds.). Alliances and Treaties between Frankish and Muslim Rulers in the Middle East: Cross-Cultural Diplomacy in the Period of the Crusades. Leiden: Brill. ISBN 978-90-04-24857-1.
- Lewis, Bernard (1968) [1967]. The Assassins. New York: Basic Books. ISBN 0-465-00498-9.
- Tonghini, Cristina; Montevecci, N. (2006). "The Castle of Shayzar". In Kennedy, Hugh N. (ed.). Muslim Military Architecture in Greater Syria: From the Coming of Islam to the Ottoman Period. Leiden: Brill. ISBN 90-04-14713-6.
- Zakkar, Suhayl (1971). The Emirate of Aleppo: 1004–1094. Aleppo: Dar al-Amanah. OCLC 819643.
