= The Race for Paradise =

2014 work on the history of the crusades

The Race for Paradise: An Islamic History of the Crusades
- Author: Paul M. Cobb
- Subject: History
- Publication date: 2014
- ISBN: 978-0199532018

The Race for Paradise: An Islamic History of the Crusades is a work on the history of the crusades by Paul M. Cobb, focusing on the perspective of medieval Muslims.

== Synopsis ==
Instead of following the traditional chronology of The Crusades—beginning with the Council of Clermont and the First Crusade, and ending with the Siege of Acre—Cobb begins with the Norman conquest of Sicily and ends with the 1453 Ottoman Conquest of Constantinople. Also avoided is the numerical progression of the Crusades, in favour of a compressive view of the clash between the Islamic and Christian world's throughout the Mediterranean. The work is organised chronologically into 9 chapters, each focussing on concurrent in different regions.

== Reception ==
Beth Spacey, in the British Journal for Military History found the book "reward[ed] the reader with both breadth and depth", which she thought would be valuable "to specialist and non-specialist readers alike".

Roberto Celestre, in Oriente Moderno, was complimentary of the serious attempt to present an Islamic perspective on the crusades without demonising the crusaders. Similarly, Alex Mallett, in the Bulletin of the School of Oriental & African Studies, thought it compared well to previous attempts at a study of the Islamic perspective on the conflict which were either sensationalist—such as The Crusades through Arab Eyes—or lacking the general political history—The Crusades: Islamic Perspectives. Overall, he called it an "exceptional [...] introduction to the Muslim side of the Crusades".

Stephanie Honchell, in the Review of Middle East Studies, called it an "impressive and thought-provoking contribution to the historiography of both the Crusades and the Islamic world" and "original and innovative work". He also thought that the periodization that Cobb proposed "promotes a shift away from Eurocentrism". Niall Christie, in The Historian, also called it a "an outstanding history of the Muslim experience of the Crusades".
