= Kitab al-I'tibar =

Book by Usāmah ibn Munqidh

- Author: Usama ibn Munqidh
- Original title: كتاب الاعتبار
- Language: Arabic
- Subject: Autobiography, History
- Genre: Non-fiction
- Media type: Print (Hardcover & Paperback)

Kitab al-I'tibar (Arabic: كتاب الاعتبار, The Book of Learning by Example or The Book of Contemplation) is the autobiography of Usama ibn-Munqidh, an Arab Syrian diplomat, soldier of the 12th century, hunter, poet and nobleman.

The book was first discovered in 1880 in the Real Biblioteca del Monasterio de San Lorenzo de El Escorial (San Lorenzo de El Escorial, Madrid, Spain). It exists as 134 folios with the first 21 pages missing and is considered a copy of a copy of the original made in July 1213. However, it remains the only version available to date.

Hartwig Derenbourg (1844-1908) was the first to mention the manuscript in his three-volume book "Les manuscrits arabes de l'Escurial" (1884-1903) and his book "Ousama ibn Mounkidh, un émir syrien" (1889) when he studied, transcribed and published the work. Philip K. Hitti (1886 – 1978) added to his work in his publication "An Arab-Syrian Gentlemen in the Period of the Crusades: Memoirs of Usamah ibn-Munqidh", with the latest edition published in 2000 by Columbia University Press.

Usamah's autobiography is part of the literary genre known as adab which aims at "pleasing, diverting and titillating" its readers, as well as instructing them. Philip K. Hitti, in the introduction to his translation, describes the work as superior to other Arabic biographies. According to him, It gives us a glimpse into Syrian methods of warfare, hawking and medication, and ushers us into the intimacies of Moslem court life as well as private home life.. It also offers an insight into the mindset of Arabic knights as they interacted with the crusaders as friends, fought against them as enemies and on matters of religion and politics.

== Islamic society in the 12th century ==
Much of the autobiography addresses the material culture of the time. It describes wealthier society members, including their houses, clothes and valued possessions. There is much detail on military society as Usama was involved in many battles against Christians and fellow Muslims, including attitudes towards the Christian crusaders. It provides an idea of the internal political structure as Usama served under the Fatimid court in Egypt and under Nur al-Din. Usama provides information on medical practices, religion and hunting.

=== Material culture ===
When Usama moves to Egypt in 1144 the caliph provided him with a place to reside, which he describes:

(the caliph) had me invested with a robe of honour in his presence, bestowed on me a full wardrobe together with one hundred dinars, authorized me to use his baths and assigned for my residence one of the mansions of al-Afdal, son of the Amir-al-Juyush, which was extremely magnificent, fully equipped with carpets, furniture and a complete outfit of brass utensils.

The autobiography gives evidence of textiles and clothing: He [Al-Malik al-'Adil] put at my disposal six thousand Egyptian dinars, a camel load of Dabiqi clothes, of ciclatoum, of squirrel-furred gowns, of Dimyati brocade, and of turbans.

Dabiqi cloth was linen, sometimes interwoven with gold and silk, ciclatoun was another precious cloth. Dimyati brocade was a white linen or silk with added gold threads. Usama describes the things that were plundered from his home when he had to flee from it: From the hall of my home they carried away forty huge camel bags all sewn up and containing great quantities of silver, gold and clothing, and from my stable they marched away thirty-six horses and female saddle mules

Usama describes another time when his possessions were stolen when his family are returning from Egypt. On their journey, the King of Jerusalem took all their valuable possessions: ...jewellery, which had been entrusted to the women, clothes, gems, swords, weapons and gold and silver amounting to about thirty thousand dinars.

The most significant loss for Usama was his 4,000 books. Books would be a very valuable item in the era before printing as they must be transcribed by hand (by a scribe) and only the wealthy would be able to afford them. Usama can cope with the loss of his other possessions but could never forget the loss of his books: "Their loss has left a heartsore that will stay with me to the last day of my life".

In the militarized society of the time, war spoils were highly valued. They demonstrated prestige as only the rich elite could afford them. For example, Usama describes a quilted gold saddle he owned. He suggests that only someone of his status could afford such an item: Read what is on it. Is it' Abbas ' name and his son's, or is it my name? And who else in the days of al-Hafiz could ride in Egypt on a gold saddle but I?

=== Political structure of Islamic society ===
After getting into trouble with his uncle who ruled Shayzar, Usama was exiled, traveling to Damascus, Jerusalem, Cairo, Mosul and Mecca. Usama was in the army of the Atabeg Zengi, went to the Fatimid court in Egypt and was in the army of Nur al-Din. The political structure of the area changed considerably during Usama's lifetime. The Islamic world was very fragmented and divided at the time, between the Abbasid caliphate of Baghdad and the Fatimid caliphate based on Cairo. By the late 11th century neither caliph held any real power and autonomous rulers were establishing themselves. In reality, the three great powers at the end of the 11th century were the Great Seljuk Sultanate, the Seljuk Sultanate of Rum and the Fatimid Caliphate which was ruled by a military wazirate. By the end of his life, however, Syria and Egypt were united under Saladin and had re-conquered most of the Kingdom of Jerusalem from the crusaders.

The Fatimite court was full of conspiracies and feuds. Usama shows how the power of the caliph was limited by the military rulers and how the instability of the government caused feuds and assassinations For example, in 1150 the Fatimite caliph tried to kill his vizier:

Al-Zafir [the caliph] now planned to put al-Adil (his vizier) to death. He concerted with a group of young men from his special bodyguard, together with others whom he won over to the scheme by distributing money among them, that they attack al-Adil in his home and put him to death.

Another instance is when al-Adil is killed by Nasr ibn Abbas, and Ibn Abbas' father (Abbas ibn Abi al-Futuh) becomes the vizier.

When al-Adil had gone to sleep, that prefect notified Ibn Abbas who, with six of his attendants, made an assault upon him in the house in which he was sleeping and killed him.

Also revealed is the corruption and bribery that went on. Usama gives the example of when the caliph tried to persuade Ibn Abbas to kill his father so that he would succeed to become vizier. The caliph bribes him to do this:

He received twenty trays of silver holding twenty thousand dinars. After neglecting him for a few days, the caliph sent him an assortment of clothing of all kinds. ..

Ibn Abbas, however tells his father about the plot and they decide to kill the Caliph:

Nasr invited the caliph to come to his residence. ..after having installed a band of followers on one side of the house. As soon as the caliph was seated, the band rushed upon him and killed him

== Attitudes towards the west ==
The autobiography gives us details of Muslim attitudes towards the Christian crusaders who went to the Middle East. His views of the Franks can reveal the impression Muslims had at the time about the nature of their own society compared to the Franks' society, for example when he describes the lack of jealousy in sexual affairs. Hitti points out that to a conservative Muslim this must have seemed shocking. Another example is his ridicule of the Frankish system of justice. He gives a couple of examples; The first is a description of a duel to settle a dispute and the second is a man being dropped into a cask of water. If the man drowned he was innocent and if he floated he was guilty:

This man did his best to sink when they dropped him into the water, but he could not do it. So he had to submit to their sentence against him -may Allah's curse be upon them!

This would have contrasted dramatically with the contemporary Muslim judicial procedure. Usama views Islamic society and learning as superior to that of the Franks. For example, when a Frankish knight offers to take his son to his country to educate him in wisdom and chivalry, he refuses:

Thus there fell upon my ears words which would never come out of the head of a sensible man; for even if my son were to be taken captive, his captivity could not bring him a worse misfortune than carrying him into the lands of the Franks.

He also criticises their medicine, giving an example of an amputation, which killed a patient, however he follows this up with examples of some successful medical cures the Franks practiced.

Usama describes the Franks as 'animals possessing the virtues of courage and fighting, but nothing else'. Despite this however, Usama became friends with one Frankish knight who he describes as a:

Reverend knight who had just arrived from their land in order to make the holy pilgrimage and then return home. He was of my intimate fellowship and kept such constant company with me that he began to call me "my brother". Between us were mutual bonds of amity and friendship.

This attitude towards the Christians reflects Islamic society at the time. The Muslims were willing to co-operate with the Franks. Muslim rulers often made alliances with the Crusader states in their own internal struggles against fellow Muslims. There is a difference in the attitude to Franks who were new to the area and those who had been there for a long time. The Franks who have lived there a while have got used to the customs of Islamic society while the newcomers are more hostile:

Everyone who is a fresh emigrant from the Frankish lands is ruder in character than those who have become acclimatized and have held long associations with the Muslims

== Medical practices ==
Usama gives us details of medical practices by mentioning medical cures he has witnessed. For example, someone who had lost his speech because of dust in his throat from sifting. He was given vinegar by a physician and cured:

He drank it and took his seat for an instant, after which he felt nauseated and began to vomit clay in abundance, mixed with the vinegar that he had drunk. Consequently his throat became open again and his speech normal.

Another example is when Usama is suffering from a cold; he is given an Indian melon which cures him: 'no sooner had I finished eating it than I began to perspire and the cold which I felt disappeared'.

Arab doctors were also good at bone setting, as well as stitching, Usama describes one man whose face was struck with a sword which:

Cut through his eyebrow, eyelid, cheek, nose and upper lip, making the whole side of his face hang down on his chest. ..his face was stitched and his cut was treated until he was healed and returned to his former condition.

Usama is often quoted out of context to "prove" Arab medicine as superior to that of the Franks in his time. He gives an example of the difference between Thabit, a Christian [Arab] physician sent by Usama's uncle with that of a Frankish physician. Thabit describes his method of treatment:

"They brought before me a knight in whose leg an abscess had grown; and a woman afflicted with imbecility .To the knight I applied a small poultice until the abscess opened and became well; and the woman I put on a diet and made her humour wet."

In contrast, the Frankish physician amputated the knight's leg causing him to die on the spot, and to the woman, he diagnosed that she had been possessed by a devil and made an incision in her skull which also killed the woman.

However, Usama also describes examples of successful Frankish medicine. He describes the treatment given to a knight by a Frankish physician:

A horse kicked him in the leg, which was subsequently infected and which opened in fourteen different places. Every time one of these cuts would close in one place, another would open in another place...Then came to him a Frankish physician and removed from the leg all the ointments which were on it and began to wash it with very strong vinegar. By this treatment all the cuts were healed and the man became well again

He gives another example of a boy whose neck was affected with scrofula. A Frank noticed the boy and advised the boy's father on how to cure him:

Take uncrushed leaves of glasswort, burn them, then soak the ashes in olive oil and sharp vinegar. Treat the scrofula with them until the spot on which it is growing is eaten up. Then take burnt lead, soak it in ghee butter and treat him with it. That will cure him. The father treated the boy accordingly, and the boy was cured. The sores closed and the boy returned to his normal condition of health. I have myself treated with this medicine many who were afflicted with such disease, and the treatment was successful in removing the cause of the complaint.

Usama is quoting his uncle, who is quoting said Tabith, on the example of fatal Frankish practices, whereas he himself has positive experience with, been taught, and recommends Frankish medicinal practices. Also, death following an amputation due to an abscess is the same treatment, and fate, suffered by the Ayyubid Sultan as-Salih Ayyub in 1249, miles from any Frankish physician.

== Warfare ==
Usama gives us a record of how warfare was conducted. One of the main themes of the book is that the outcome of warfare is pre-determined: 'Victory in warfare is from Allah...and is not due to organisation and planning nor to the number of troops and supporters., He describes how discipline was maintained while marching through enemy territory:

...making our stops at the call of the bugle and starting again at the call of the bugle.

Siege warfare was much more common than open battles; Usama describes the practice of mining, digging a tunnel under a castle and then setting light to the wooden supports so the tunnel would collapse taking the tower of the castle with it.

Usama also gives us information on the sort of armour and arms that were used. The lance was a very important weapon; Usama describes using lances in the battle of Kafartab:

We dislodged from them eighteen knights, of whom some received lance blows and died, others received lance blows and fell off their horses and died, and still others received lance blows which fell on their horses and became footmen.

The sword was also a high status weapon. Usama describes how his father's sword cut through his groom's outfit while it was still in its sheath:

The sword cut through the outfit, the silver sandal, a mantle and a wooden shawl which the groom had on, and then cut through the bone of his elbow. The whole forearm fell off.

The sword was subsequently named after his father's groom.

== Hunting ==
Usama devotes a section of his book to his hunting experiences. He describes the hunting practice of Zengi:

The falconers would proceed ahead of us with the falcons which would be flown at the waterfowl. The drums would be beaten in accordance with the prevailing custom. The falcons would catch whatever birds they could. ..

He also describes hunting partridges with his father:

My father would draw near the sleeping partridge and throw at it a stick from his hand. The moment the Partridge was flushed he would throw off al- Yahshiir (the falcon), who would seize it. ..The falconer would then descend to it, slay the bird...

The falconer had to slay the bird himself as it was forbidden by the Qur'an to eat anything which is killed by a blow. Usama also describes a system of hunting using sakers:

At first should be sent the leader which, striking a gazelle, binds on its ear. The auxiliary is sent after the leader, and hits another gazelle...The leader, now clutching the gazelle by its ear, isolates it from the herd.

== See also ==
- Usama ibn Munqidh
- Zengi
- Fatimid
- Fulk of Jerusalem
- Nur ad-Din Zangi
