= Shayzar Castle =

Historic castle in Syria

- قلعة شيزر (Arabic)
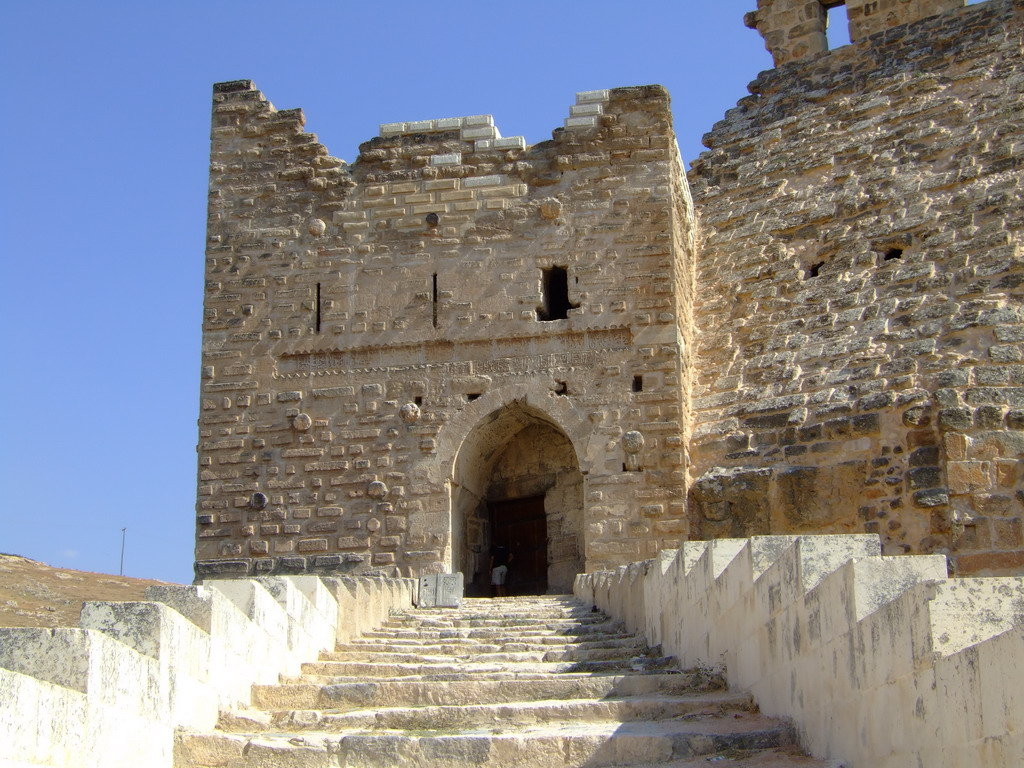

- Location within Syria
- Location: Shaizar, Syria

Shayzar Castle (Arabic: قلعة شيزر) is a historic fortress located in Shaizar, Hama Governorate in northwestern Syria, atop a hill overlooking the Orontes River.

== History ==
The castle's significance dates back to the Middle Ages, as it served as a strategic site during the Crusades and the Islamic wars in the region. It was used as an administrative center and a military stronghold by local rulers.

== Description ==
The castle is distinguished by its high walls and defensive towers, and it underwent several stages of construction and expansion over the centuries.

== Current status ==
Today, the castle contains archaeological remains that attract researchers and visitors interested in the region's military and architectural history.

== See also ==
- List of castles in Syria
- Citadel of Damascus
