= Shaizar =

Shaizar شيزر Larissa
- Village
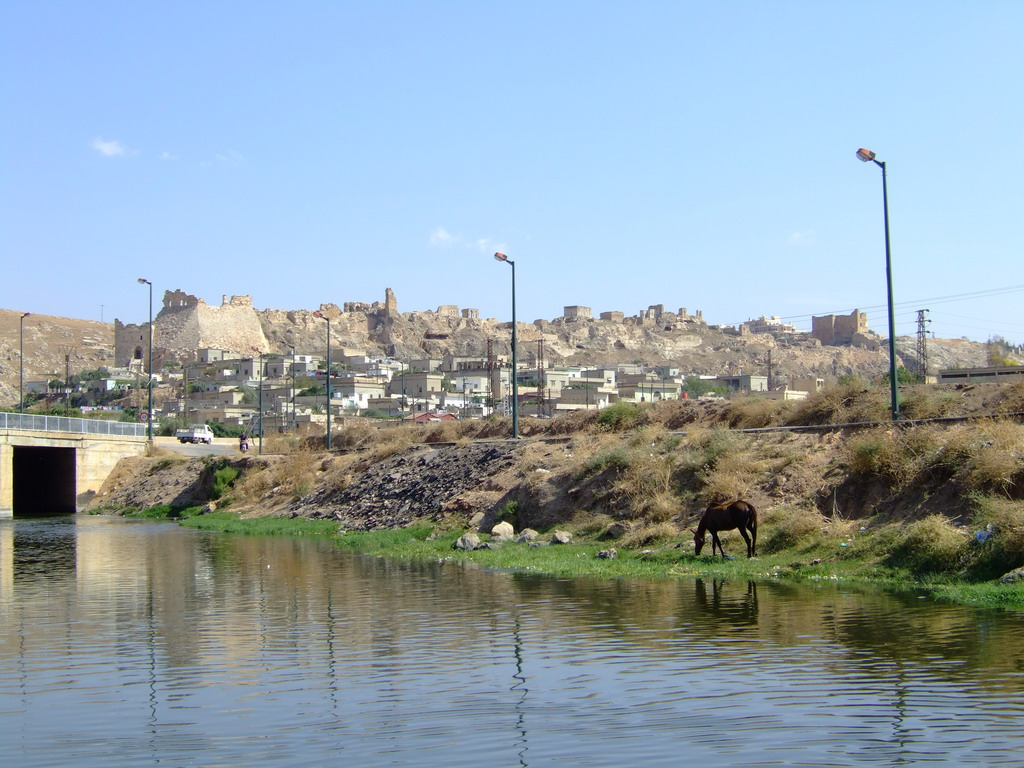
- The fortress and town of Shaizar

- Location in Syria
- Coordinates: 35°16′04″N 36°34′00″E
- Country: Syria
- Governorate: Hama
- District: Mahardah
- Subdistrict: Mahardah

Population (2004 census)
  - Total: 5,953
- Time zone: UTC+3 (AST)

Shaizar or Shayzar (Arabic: شيزر, or Saijar in modern Arabic; Hellenistic name: Larissa in Syria; in Greek: Λάρισσα εν Συρία) is a town in northern Syria, administratively part of the Hama Governorate, located in the northwest of the provincial capital. Localities include: Mahardah, Tremseh, Kafr Hud, Khunayzir, and Halfaya. According to the Syria Central Bureau of Statistics (CBS), Shaizar had a recorded population of 5,953 in the 2004 census.

During the crusades, the town was a fortress, ruled by the Banu Munqidh family, and played an important role in the Christian and Muslim politics of the crusades.

== Location ==
Shaizar is located at a strategically vital crossing point on the Orontes River, 25 km (15.5 mi) northwest of the provincial capital of Hama, and 3 km (1.9 mi) northwest of Mahardah.

== Name evolution ==
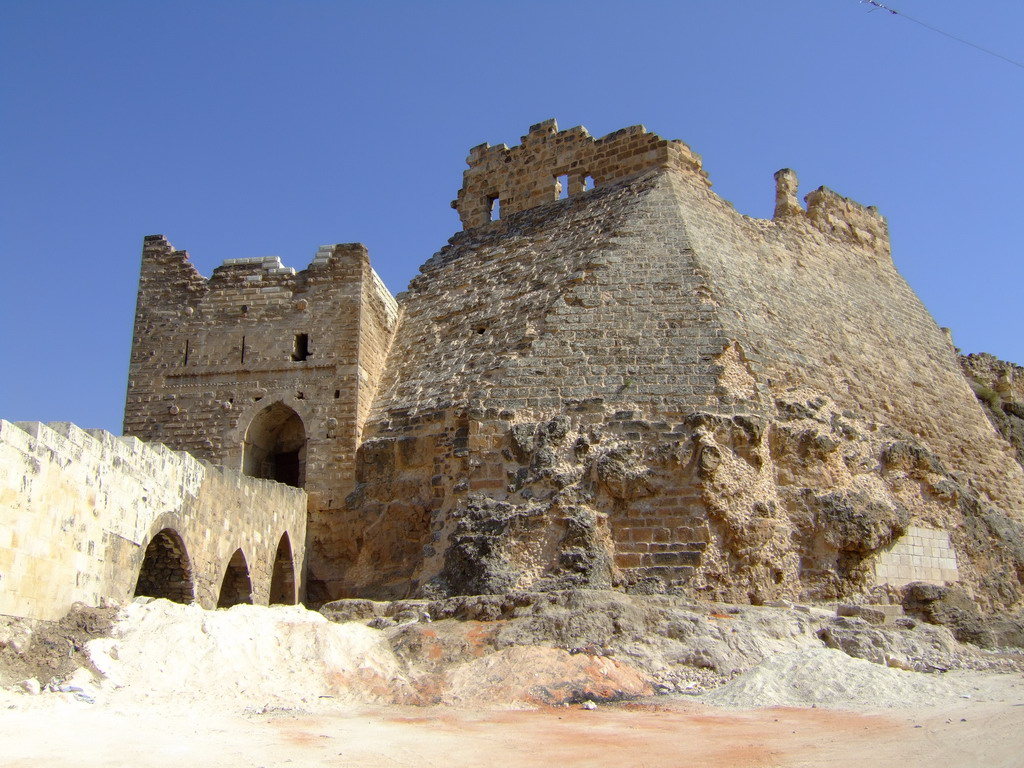
The fortress of Shaizar

In the Amarna letters (14th century BC) it is mentioned as Senzar or Sezar.

To the Greeks it was known as Sidzara, but during the Seleucid Empire it was renamed Larissa, after the town Larissa in Thessaly (Greece) from which many colonists came.

It reverted to its earlier name under the Roman Empire and was known as Sezer under the Byzantine Empire.

The Crusaders rendered the city's name in Latin as Caesarea. This name had not been used in any earlier period, and was derived from the Crusaders mistakenly identifying this city as being Caesarea Mazaca, a place renowned in Christian history as the home of Saint Basil of Caesarea.

Shaizar's ruins are known as Saijar in modern Arabic.

== History ==
=== Late Bronze Age ===
Shaizar is mentioned as Senzar or Sezar in the Amarna letters (14th century BC).

=== Classical Age ===
==== Hellenistic period ====
Diodorus Siculus (first century BC) records local legends attributing the establishment of the town by one of Alexander's cavalry regiments originating from Thessaly. The town was renamed Larissa Sizara, Larissa being the town in Thessaly from which many Greek settlers came. According to Diodorus, these colonists received land as a reward for their bravery.

Both the Thessalian city and the Syrian town were known for their horse breeding. Diodorus also mentions that the Larisans provided the horsemen for the first agema of the Seleucid cavalry.

==== Roman period ====
The Roman armies led by Pompey conquered Syria in 64 BC.

Syria was briefly occupied by Republican-Parthian forces under the Parthian prince Pacorus I.

The Tabula Peutingeriana places Larisa 13 miles from Apamea and 14 miles from Epiphaneia.

=== Byzantine and Early Arab periods ===
The city remained part of the Christianised empire, known as the Byzantine Empire, under the name of Sezer.

Shaizar fell to the Arabs in 638 and frequently passed from Arab to Byzantine control. It was sacked in 968 by Byzantine emperor Nicephorus II, and was captured by Basil II in 999, after which it became the southern border of the Byzantine Empire and was administered by the Bishop of Shaizar. A Fatimid castle was standing at Shaizar by the time the Byzantines recaptured the town.

It was lost to the Banu Munqidh in 1081 when Ali ibn Munqidh bought it from the bishop.

=== Munqidhite Shaizar (1081–1157) ===
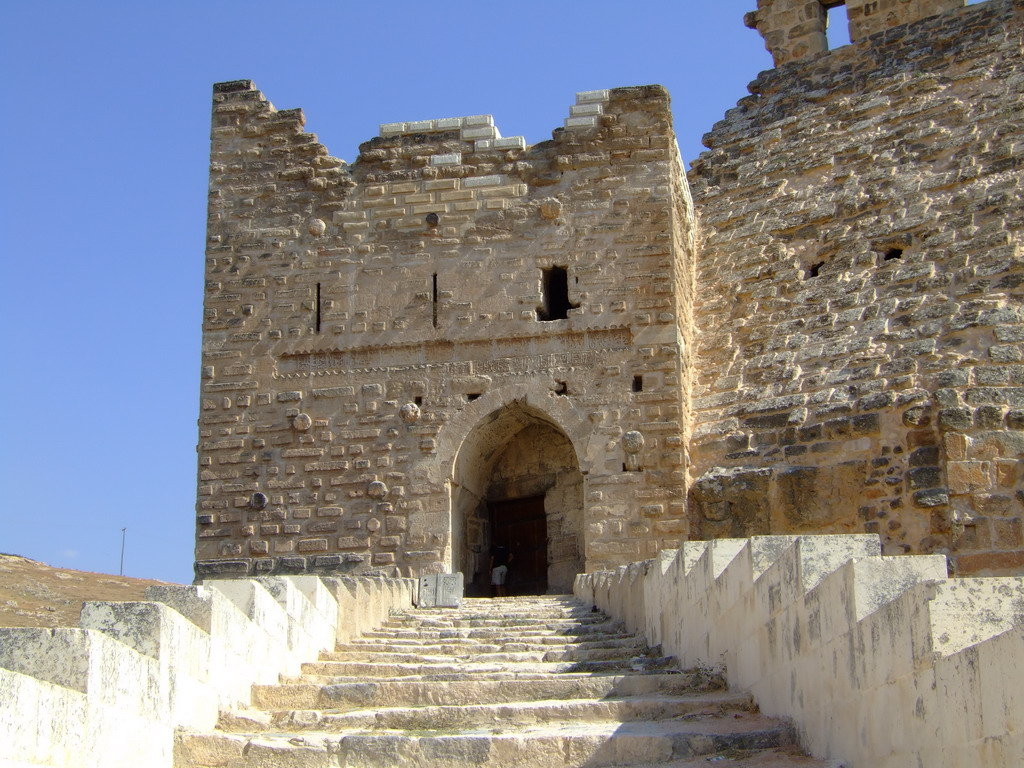
The fortress of Shaizar

The Munqidhites controlled territory east of Shaizar, across the al-Ansariyah mountains to the Mediterranean coast, from the coastal cities of Latakia in the north to Tortosa in the south. In 1086, Naṣr b. al-ʽAlī b. Munqidh had to submit to the Seljuk Sultan Malik-Shah I. Around 1088/89, the Seljuk governor of Aleppo, Aqsunqur, besieged the town and ravaged it.

During the First Crusade in 1099, the emir assisted the Crusaders passing through his land, giving them horses and food and other provisions. After the crusade it was bordered by the crusader Principality of Antioch and the County of Tripoli. The interaction between the Crusader states and the Banu Munqidh rulers of Shaizar consisted of a series of wars and alliances.

When the Crusaders briefly conquered Qalaat al-Madiq, a fortress to the northwest of Shaizar and overlooking ancient Apamea, in 1106, the Banu Munqidh clan harassed them from their base in Shaizar.

In 1106, the Munqidhite emirs Murshid and Sultan defeated William-Jordan of Tripoli, and in 1108 and 1110 they had to bribe Tancred to leave. Tancred, Baldwin I of Jerusalem, and Bertrand of Tripoli besieged the city during the battle of Shaizar of 1111 for two weeks, but returned home when the army of Mawdud of Mosul cut off their access to food and water. Tancred nevertheless built a castle nearby on Tell ibn Ma'shar, in order to keep Shaizar under close watch.

When Ridwan of Aleppo died in 1113, Shaizar was inundated by many of his Assassin supporters that were expelled from the city by his son Alp Arslan al-Akras. Shaizar participated in Ilghazi's campaign against Antioch in 1119. When Baldwin II of Jerusalem was taken captive by the Artuqid Belek Ghazi outside Edessa in 1123, he was held at Shaizar until his release the next year. As part of his ransom he was forced to give up his daughter Ioveta as a hostage, who was also held at Shaizar until her own ransom in 1125. As Shaizar was a friendly state, Baldwin was allowed to visit his daughter there, but Shaizar was also friendly to its Muslim neighbours, and in 1125 was incorporated into the territory of Aqsunqur al-Bursuqi, atabeg of Mosul. When Zengi succeeded-Bursuqi's son in Mosul in 1127 and claimed Aleppo as well, Shaizar recognized his suzerainty.

In 1137, Byzantine emperor John II Comnenus arrived to impose Byzantine authority on Antioch, and promised Raymond of Antioch a principality consisting of Shaizar, Aleppo, Homs, and Hama if Antioch was returned to the Empire. In April 1138, the Byzantine army led the siege of Shaizar, but Raymond and Joscelin II of Edessa did not assist the emperor. Zengi soon arrived to relieve the fortress in May. The emir preferred Byzantine control to Zengid, and offered to recognize John as his overlord. Neither John or Zengi ever really enforced their authority there and Shaizar remained independent.

The emirate lasted until the enormous earthquake of 1157, during which the citadel collapsed, killing almost the entire family, who had assembled there to celebrate a circumcision. The only survivors out of the whole family were the wife of emir, and the emir's nephew Usama ibn Munqidh, the famed poet-knight who was on a diplomatic mission to Damascus. Nur al-Din Zengi, the ruler of Aleppo and Damascus who had thus far been unable to exert direct rule over it, moved to occupy the city rather than allow it to fall into Christian hands. Thereafter, the city was besieged by Christian forces in 1157.

==== Description of the city ====
Referring to the crusader siege of Shaizar in 1157, William of Tyre writes:

The city of Shayzar lies upon the same Orontes river which flows by Antioch. It is called by some Caesarea, and by them is believed to be the famous metropolis of Cappadocia over which the distinguished teacher St. Basil once presided; but those who hold this view are in grave error. For that Caesarea is a fifteen days journey or more from Antioch. This city is in Coelesyria, a province which is separated from Cappadocia by many intervening provinces. Nor is the name Caesarea, but rather Caesara. It is one of the suffragan cities belonging to the patriarchate of Antioch. It is very conveniently situated. The lower part extends along the plain, while upon the heights of the upper part is the citadel, fairly long in extent but rather narrow. It is well fortified, for in addition to its natural defenses, the river protects it on one side and the city on the other, so that it is entirely inaccessible.

Fulcher of Chartres, an eyewitness to the siege in 1111, did not know the classical Roman or Greek name for the site, and noted that the Turks called it "Sisara", "but the inhabitants of the country commonly call it 'Chezar'."

==== Life in the city ====
Regarding the citizens, William of Tyre says they:

had but little knowledge of arms; their attention was devoted almost entirely to trading.

Many of them were Christians, whom William considered to be suffering as slaves under their Muslim rulers, but the Munqidhites seem to have been tolerant lords and both Christians and Muslims of various sects lived there peacefully.

The Munqidhite prince Usama ibn Munqidh wrote the Kitab al-I'tibar, a memoir describing life in Shaizar and elsewhere in the 12th-century Muslim world.

The Munqidhite emirs are shown as patrons of literature, who delight in hunting and other sports, as well as delighting in making war on, and negotiating peace with, their Christian and Muslim neighbours.

==== Munqidh emirs of Shaizar ====
Shaizar was ruler by the Banu Munquid from 1059–1157. The emirs were:

- Sultan ibn 'Ali ibn al-Muqallad ibn Munqidh al-Kinani (1059–1081)
- 'Izz ad-Dawla Sadid al-Mulk ibn Munqidh (1081–1082)
- 'Izz ad-Dawla abu-l-Murhaf Nasr ibn Munqidh (1082–1098)
- Majd ad-Din abu Salamah Murshid ibn 'Izz ad-Dawla ibn Munqidh (1098–1137; the Latin Machedolus, father of Usama ibn Munqidh)
- 'Izz ad-Din abu-l-'Asakir Sultan ibn 'Izz ad-Dawla ibn Munqidh (1098–1154)
- Taj ad-Dawla Nasr ad-Din Muhammad ibn abu-l-Asakir ibn Munqidh (1154–1157).

==== Usama ibn Munqidh ====
Usama ibn Munqidh was a medieval Muslim poet, author, faris (knight), and diplomat from the Banu Munqidh dynasty of Shaizar in northern Syria. His life coincided with the rise of several medieval Muslim dynasties, the arrival of the First Crusade, and the establishment of the Crusader states. He was born in Shaizar, Şeyzer. He was the nephew and potential successor of the emir of Shaizar, but was exiled in 1131 and spent the rest of his life serving other leaders. He was a courtier to the Burids, Zengids, and Ayyubids in Damascus, serving the Zengi, Nur ad-Din, and Saladin over a period of almost fifty years. He also served the Fatimid court in Cairo, as well as the Artuqids in Hisn Kayfa. He traveled extensively in Arab lands, visiting Egypt, Syria, Palestine and along the Tigris River, and went on pilgrimage to Mecca. He often meddled in the politics of the courts in which he served, and he was exiled from both Damascus and Cairo.

During and immediately after his life, he was most famous as a poet and adib (a "man of letters"). He wrote many poetry anthologies, such as the Kitab al-'Asa ("Book of the Staff"), Lubab al-Adab ("Kernels of Refinement"), and al-Manazil wa'l-Diyar ("Dwellings and Abodes"), and collections of his own original poetry. In modern times, he is remembered more for his Kitab al-I'tibar ("Book of Learning by Example" or "Book of Contemplation"), which contains lengthy descriptions of the Crusaders, whom he interacted with on many occasions, and some of whom he considered friends.

Most of his family was killed in an earthquake at Shaizar in 1157. He died in Damascus in 1188, at the age of 93.

=== Assassin, Zengid and Mamluk periods (1158–1260) ===
The Assassins then took control of the ruins, and they were defeated by the Crusaders in 1158, but disputes forced the Crusaders to abandon the siege. Nur ad-Din then incorporated the remains into his territory and rebuilt the city. Shaizar was destroyed again by an earthquake in 1170 and the remnants were taken by Saladin in 1174. They were rebuilt again, but in 1241 the city was sacked by the Khwarezmians. The Mamluk sultan Baibars captured and rebuilt the city in 1260.

=== Modern period ===
The citadel (castle) was declared a national monument in 1958 and the last inhabitants were evacuated to prevent archaeological damage. Today the site is known as Qal’at Shayzar (citadel or castle of Shayzar), while the name Shaizar (or Shayzar) is used for the modern town.

== See also ==
- Battle of Shaizar (1111)
- List of castles in Syria
- Siege of Shaizar (1138)
- Qalaat al-Madiq
- Shayzar Castle

== Sources ==
- Baldwin, Marsall W. (1969) [1955]. "The Latin States under Baldwin III and Amalric I, 1143–1174; The Decline and Fall of Jerusalem, 1174–1189". In Setton, Kenneth M.; Baldwin, Marshall W. (eds.). A History of the Crusades, Volume I: The First Hundred Years. Vol. 1 (Second ed.). Madison, Milwaukee, and London: University of Wisconsin Press. pp. 528–561, 590–621. ISBN 0-299-04834-9.
- Steven Runciman, A History of the Crusades, vol. II: The Kingdom of Jerusalem. Cambridge University Press, 1952
- The Damascus Chronicle of the Crusades, Extracted and Translated from the Chronicle of Ibn al-Qalanisi. H.A.R. Gibb, 1932 (reprint, Dover Publications, 2002)
- William of Tyre, A History of Deeds Done Beyond the Sea, trans. E.A. Babcock and A.C. Krey. Columbia University Press, 1943
- Philip K. Hitti, trans., An Arab-Syrian Gentleman and Warrior in the Period of the Crusades; Memoirs of Usamah ibn-Munqidh (Kitab al i'tibar). New York, 1929
- Fulcher of Chartres, A History of the Expedition to Jerusalem, trans. Frances Rita Ryan. University of Tennessee Press, 1969
- Usama ibn Munqidh, and Philip K. Hitti. An Arab-Syrian Gentleman and Warrior in the Period of the Crusades: Memoirs of Usāmah Ibn-Munqidh (kitāb Al-Iʻtibār). New York: Columbia University Press, 2000.
- Cobb, Paul M. (2005). Usama ibn Munqidh: Warrior-Poet in the Age of Crusades. Oxford: Oneworld.
- Beihammer, Alexander Daniel (2017). Byzantium and the Emergence of Muslim-Turkish Anatolia, Ca. 1040-1130 Volumen 20 de Birmingham Byzantine and Ottoman Studies. Taylor & Francis. ISBN 9781351983860.
- Kennedy, Hugh N. (2012). "Shayzar: An Historical Overview of its History and the Archaeological Investigation: 1.1. An Historical Overview". In Tonghini, Cristina (ed.). Shayzar I: The Fortification of the Citadel. Leiden: Brill. pp. 2–25.
- Maalouf, Amin, and Jon Rothschild. The Crusades Through Arab Eyes. London: Al Saqi Books, 2004.
