= Paul M. Cobb =

American historian (born 1967)

Paul M. Cobb (born 1967) is an American historian of the medieval Islamic world. He is currently a Professor of Islamic History at the University of Pennsylvania. His areas of interest include Islamic relations with the West, historiography, and the history of travel and exploration. He is, in particular, a recognized authority on the history of the Crusades in their Islamic context.

== Career ==
Cobb was born in Amherst, Massachusetts, where he attended public schools. In 1989, he graduated from the University of Massachusetts in Amherst with a BA (cum laude) in Anthropology. In 1991, he received his MA in Near Eastern Languages and Civilizations from the University of Chicago and then studied at CASA, the Center for Arabic Study Abroad, in Cairo, Egypt. He returned to Chicago and in 1997 he received his PhD in Islamic history from the Department of Near Eastern Languages and Civilizations. He has taught at Smith College (1996–97), Wake Forest University (1997–99), the University of Notre Dame (1999–2008), and the University of Pennsylvania (2008–present). He currently splits his time between Philadelphia and Amherst.

His first book, White Banners: Contention in 'Abbasid Syria, 750–880 (2001), was one of the first attempts at providing a provincial history of early Islam, and to mine the vast amount of information on early Islam to be found in medieval local histories such as Ibn 'Asakir's Ta'rikh Madinat Dimashq. His interest in the history of Syria led him to the life and times of the adventurer and poet Usama ibn Munqidh (d. 1188). Cobb's biography of him, Usama ibn Munqidh: Warrior-Poet of the Age of Crusades (2006) is intended as a short and accessible sketch, based upon all of Usama's surviving works, some of which have been only recently discovered. This was followed (in 2008) with a translation of Usama's famous "memoirs" or Kitab al-I'tibar and other autobiographical writings such as The Book of Contemplation: Islam and the Crusades. Cobb's exploration of Usama's world has in turn led him to pursue other problems in the history of the Crusades, most prominently in his The Race for Paradise: An Islamic History of the Crusades (2014), which is intended as an accessible narrative history of "the Frankish problem" on all shores of the Mediterranean, from the eleventh to the fifteenth centuries, based almost exclusively upon Islamic historical sources and rooted in the context of Islamic history.

== Awards ==
Cobb has been awarded Fellowships from the National Endowment for the Humanities, the American Philosophical Society, the Fulbright Program, and the Guggenheim Foundation among others.

== Bibliography ==
- White Banners: Contention in 'Abbasid Syria, 750–880 (State University of New York Press, 2001).
- (co-edited with Wout van Bekkum), Strategies of Medieval Communal Identity: Judaism, Christianity, and Islam (Peeters, 2004).
- Usama ibn Munqidh: Warrior-Poet of the Age of Crusades (One World Publications, 2006).
- The Book of Contemplation: Islam and the Crusades (Penguin Classics, 2008).
- (co-edited with Antoine Borrut), Umayyad Legacies: Medieval memories from Syria to Spain (E. J. Brill, 2010).
- The Lineaments of Islam: Studies in Honor of Fred McGraw Donner (E. J. Brill, 2012).
- The Race for Paradise: An Islamic History of the Crusades (Oxford University Press, 2014).
