= Kafartab =

- كفرطاب (Arabic)
- Kafr Tab or Kafar Tab; Known as Capharda by the Crusaders
- Location within Syria
- 35°27′33.2″N 36°35′43.2″E
- Type: Fortification and town
- Periods: Medieval, Mamluk, Ottoman
- Location: Northwest Syria
- Region: The Levant

Kafartab (Arabic: كفرطاب, also spelled Kafr Tab or Kafar Tab, known as Capharda by the Crusaders) was a town and fortress in northwestern Syria that existed during the medieval period between the fortress cities of Maarat al-Numan in the north and Shaizar to the south. It was situated along the southeastern slopes of Jabal al-Zawiya. According to French geographer Robert Boulanger, writing in the early 1940s, Kafartab was "an abandoned ancient site" located 2.5 mi (4.0 km) northwest of Khan Shaykhun.

== History ==
=== Medieval period ===
During the Second Fitna, when the Umayyad army under Yazid I killed Husayn, the grandson of the Islamic prophet Muhammad, the people of Kafartab were among the Syrian cities who mourned Husayn's death and condemned his killers. During the Abbasid era, in the late 9th century CE, Kafartab was noted by medieval Arab geographer al-Ya'qubi as a town "in a thirsty desert plain" with no springs in its vicinity. Its inhabitants collected water from rain showers to store for later use. In 985, al-Muqaddasi wrote that the town belonged to Jund Hims (Homs Province).

Kafartab was besieged by the Banu Kilab tribe in 1012 to pressure the emir of Aleppo, Mansur ibn Lu'lu', to release Kilabi prisoners being held in the Citadel of Aleppo; the attempt failed as Kafartab's defenders repelled the Kilabi tribesmen. In 1026, when the region around the town was ruled by the Kilabi Mirdasid dynasty, the emir of Aleppo, Salih ibn Mirdas, awarded Kafartab to the Banu Munqidh as a feudal territory. The Banu Munqidh were a family from the Kinanah tribe. Until 1080, Kafartab served as their principal headquarters, after which Shaizar became their main fortress. Kafartab's emir in 1041 was reported to be a member of the family named Muqallad. In 1047, it was visited by the Persian traveler Nasir Khusraw.

The city was captured by a Crusader force led by Raymond of Saint-Gilles in 1100. During the early summer of 1104, its Antioch-based garrison abandoned Kafartab shortly after the Seljuks of Aleppo captured Maarrat al-Numan and Maarrat Misrin from them. In the summer of 1106, the Prince Tancred of Antioch once again brought Kafartab under Crusader control. Throughout 1115, Kafartab switched hands from the Crusaders of Antioch to the Seljuks under emir Bursuq and back to the Crusaders. The Crusaders rebuilt and repopulated the town, which was heavily damaged in previous battles. The Seljuk emir Aq Sunqur captured the town, which was attacked and captured by Bohemond II of Antioch later that year.

The Zengid leader Imad ad-Din Zengi conquered Kafartab and other fortress cities along the eastern frontier of Antioch's territories, such as Atarib, Maarrat al-Numan and Zardana in the spring of 1135. In the summer of 1157, a massive earthquake nearly destroyed Kafartab and other major towns in the region and killed most of the Banu Munqidh family, including its chief Taj al-Dawla Nasir al-Din Muhammad. Ten years later, the town was given to Saladin by the Zengid sultan Nur ad-Din as a reward for his victories in defending Egypt from the Crusaders. Saladin returned to Egypt and overthrew its Fatimid rulers, founded the Ayyubid dynasty and launched an invasion of Syria. As his forces approached the Zengid stronghold of Aleppo in 1176, he entered a truce with them that preserved their territory other than Kafartab, which he demanded be ceded back to him. In 1178/9, Saladin handed the villages near Maarat al-Numan including Kafartab to be ruled by the Ayyubid emir Shams ad-Din ibn al-Muqaddam, as he took Baalbek instead. Kafartab was under the control of az-Zahir Ghazi, the Ayyubid emir of Aleppo in 1202. In 1241, Kafartab, then a part of the domain of the Banu al-Daya family, was sacked and looted by the Khwarazemids.

=== Mamluk era ===
In a treaty between the Bahri Mamluk sultan Baibars and the Knights Hospitallers, Kafartab is confirmed as part of the Mamluk territories. During a conflict between Sultan Qalawun and his viceroy Sunqur al-Ashqar in 1281–82, the latter ceded Shaizar to Qalawun in exchange for Kafartab, Apamea, Antioch and other territories. During the Mamluk period, Kafartab was a subdistrict town in the Halab Mamlaka (Aleppo Province), which like other towns with its status, served as a local trade center for smaller localities in its orbit.

In the early 14th century, the historian and Ayyubid emir Abu'l-Fida mentioned Kafartab, saying it was "a town so small as to be like a village, where there is but little water". At that time it served as the principal town of its district and its inhabitants produced clay pots which they exported to the surrounding regions. In 1362, Kafartab was one of a number of localities to survive a plague that spread across Syria. In the 17th century, during Ottoman rule, Kafartab was designated as a kaza (judicial district) of the Aleppo Vilayet (Aleppo Province).

== Bibliography ==
- Elisséeff, N. (1984). "Ma'arrat al-Nu'man". In Bosworth, C. E.; Donzel, E. van; Lewis, B.; et al. (eds.). The Encyclopaedia of Islam. E. J. Brill.
- Ehrenkreutz, Andrew S. (1972). Saladin. State University of New York Press. ISBN 9780873950954.
- Holt, Peter Malcolm (1995). E. J. Brill. Brill. ISBN 9789004102460.
- Ibn-Munqidh, Usama (2000). Hitti, Phillip K. (ed.). An Arab-Syrian Gentleman and Warrior in the Period of the Crusades: Memoirs of Usāmah Ibn-Munqidh (Kitāb Al-Iʻtibār). Columbia University Press. ISBN 9780231121248.
- Lyons, Malcolm Cameron (1984). Saladin: The Politics of the Holy War. Cambridge University Press. ISBN 0-521-317398.
- Northrup, Linda S. (1998). From Slave to Sultan: The Career of Al-Manṣūr Qalāwūn and the Consolidation of Mamluk Rule in Egypt and Syria (678-689 A.H./1279-1290 A.D.). Franz Steiner Verlag Stuggart. ISBN 9783515068611.
- Tonghini, Christina (2012). Shayzar I: The Fortification of the Citadel. Brill. ISBN 9789004217676.
- Venning, Timothy (2015). A Chronology of the Crusades. Routledge. ISBN 9781317496434.
- Zakkar, Suhayl (1971). The Emirate of Aleppo: 1004–1094. Aleppo: Dar al-Amanah.
- Ziadeh, Nicole A. (1953). Urban Life in Syria Under the Early Mamluks. Greenwood Press.
