= 1157 Hama earthquake =

Earthquake in west-central Syria, 1157

- Location within Syria
- Local date: 12 August 1157
- Magnitude: 7.4 M_{s}
- Epicenter: 35.1°N 36.5°E
- Areas affected: Syria (region)
- Total damage: Extreme
- Max. intensity: MMI VIII (Severe) – MMI IX (Violent)
- Casualties: 8,000

After a year of foreshocks, an earthquake occurred on 12 August 1157 near the city of Hama, in west-central Syria (then under the Seljuk rule), where the most casualties were sustained. In eastern Syria, near the Euphrates, the quake destroyed the predecessor of the citadel al-Rahba, subsequently rebuilt on the same strategic site. The earthquake also affected Christian monasteries and churches in the vicinity of Jerusalem.

== See also ==
- Banu Munqidh
- List of historical earthquakes
- Shaizar
- Timeline of Hama
