= Seljuk campaign on the Crusaders (1111) =

A seljuk campaign against the Crusader states

Seljuk campaign on Outremer
- Part of Seljuk–Crusader War
Date	July–September 1111
Location	Upper Mesopotamia, Levant
Result	Stalemate: Crusader withdrewl in the Battle of Shaizar; Seljuk failure in achieving any real accomplishment

Belligerents
Seljuk Empire: Emirate of Mosul; Rawwadid dynasty (until August); Shah-Armens (until August); Hadhabanis of Erbil (until August); Artuqids of Mardin (until August); Beykeji tribes (until August); Bursuqid dynasty (until August); Burid dynasty; Banu Munqidh (since August)	Kingdom of Jerusalem; County of Tripoli; Principality of Antioch; County of Edessa: Lordship of Turbessel

Commanders and leaders
Mas'ud ibn Muhammed; Mawdud ibn Altuntakin, Emir of Mosul; Ahmadil ibn Ibrahim, Emir of Maragha; Sokmen al-Kutbi, Shah of Ahlat # Abu al-Hayja ibn Musak, Emir of Erbil; Ayaz ibn Ilghazi; Bursuq II, Emir of Hamadhan; Tughtekin, Emir of Damascus; Sultan ibn Ali, Emir of Shaizar	Baldwin I of Jerusalem; Bertrand, Count of Tripoli; Tancred, Regent of Antioch; Baldwin II of Edessa; Joscelin of Coutrney, Lord of Turbessel

The Seljuk campaign on the Crusaders (1111) was a military campaign that took place in Upper Mesopotamia and Levant, led by Mas'ud ibn Muhammed against the Crusaders and their states.

== Background ==
In 1110, Tancred, regent of Antioch, seized the fortresses of Atharib and Zardana from the Seljuks of Aleppo. Sidon also fell to Baldwin I of Jerusalem, and Sigurd I of Norway. This sparked panic, prompting Muslim rulers to seek peace from the Crusader leaders in exchange for tribute. Fakhr al-Mulk Ridwan, Sultan of Aleppo, paid 32,000 dinars, along with horses and clothing. The governor of Tyre paid 7,000 dinars, Sultan ibn Munqidh, Emir of Shaizar, paid 4,000 dinars, and Ali al-Kurdi, ruler of Hama, paid 2,000 dinars. However, this humiliation and submission angered the Muslim population, especially in Aleppo. Having lost hope in Ridwan, they decided to seek support from the Abbasid Caliph Ahmad al-Mustazhir Billah. A delegation of merchants, scholars, and Sufis, led by a Sharif, traveled to Baghdad.

=== Baghdad Demonstrations (1110) ===
On Friday, February 17, 1111, the people of Aleppo arrived in Baghdad. They publicized their cause in the city, and scholars and others met with them. They went to the Sultan's Mosque and appealed to him for help, breaking the minbar and disrupting the Friday prayer. Sultan Muhammad I Tapar eventually promised to send an army to fight the Crusaders, but no action was taken throughout the week. The following Friday, February 24, the people of Aleppo, along with a group from Baghdad, went to the Palace Mosque in the Caliph's residence. They forcibly entered the mosque and broke the Caliph's enclosure and the pulpit, disrupting Friday prayer once again. Caliph al-Mustazhir Billah sent a message to Sultan Muhammad I requesting that he address the problem. The Sultan declared jihad and ordered the emirs to prepare an army to fight the Crusaders. Ibn al-Qalanisi mentioned that these events coincided with the return of Ismah Khatun, the Caliph's wife and the Sultan's sister, from her visit to Isfahan. However, the demonstrations marred her return and angered the Caliph. He wanted to punish the demonstrators, but the Sultan calmed him down and told him he would call the emirs to jihad. Ibn al-Qalanisi also mentioned that the Byzantine Emperor Alexios I Komnenos offered an alliance with the Seljuks against the Crusaders.

=== The Seljuk Army ===
The Seljuk army initially consisted of soldiers and troops of Mawdud ibn Altuntakin, the Emir of Mosul. Later, Ahmadil ibn Ibrahim ibn Wahshudan, the Emir of Maragheh, joined them, followed by Sokmen al-Kutbi, the Shah of Ahlat. Subsequently, Abu al-Hayja ibn Musak, the Emir of Erbil, Ilghazi ibn Artuq, the Emir of Mardin, the Beykeji emirs, Bursuq II ibn Bursuq, the Emir of Hamadhan, and Zahir al-Dawla Tughtekin, the Emir of Damascus, were invited. All joined except Ilghazi, who sent his forces under the command of his son Ayaz to act in his place, and Bursuq, who had not yet arrived. Tughtekin gathered troops from Homs, Hama, and Rafaniyah and marched north to meet the Seljuk army. The Sultan placed this army under the nominal command of his son Ghiyath al-Din Mas'ud, while the actual command remained with Mawdud, the Emir of Mosul, who accompanied Prince Mas'ud.

== Campaign ==
=== Sieges of Edessa and Turbessel ===
The campaign began in July 1111 with the Muslims attacking the Crusader fortresses east of the Euphrates River, succeeding in capturing many of them. Then they headed to Edessa and besieged it, but the siege was prolonged because Edessa was supported with provisions and the Muslims could not breach the strong walls of the city, therefore, they decided to end the siege and go to try to capture another city. Their next destination was Turbessel, and after they crossed the Euphrates, they began the siege in 28 July 1111. Emir Bursuq II ibn Bursuq arrived with his forces and joined the campaign, and the siege continued for 45 days. During the siege, Joscelin of Courtenay, Lord of Turbessel, bribed Ahmadil al-Kurdi, the Emir of Maragha, with money and gifts to break the siege. Ahmadil withdrew from the siege with his large army despite the resentment of the campaign leaders. Ibn al-Qalanisi mentioned that he attacked Aleppo's surroundings after his withdrawal. Then a distress message arrived from Fakhr al-Mulk Ridwan, Sultan of Aleppo, requesting assistance against Tancred and the Crusaders of Antioch. Ridwan asked Mawdud to lift the siege so he could come to his aid. Ibn al-Adim mentions that Ahmadil encouraged the lifting of the siege and aid to Ridwan as part of his agreement with Joscelin. However, after the Muslims withdrew, Joscelin attacked their rear, killing nearly a thousand men and looting much. During these events, Tancred was attacking the Emirate of Banu Munqidh, but upon learning of the Seljuk campaign's approach, he ended his invasion and sent a request for assistance to Baldwin I of Jerusalem, preparing to confront the Seljuk army.

=== Levant campaign ===
But when the Muslims reached Aleppo, Ridwan closed the city gates and refused them entry. To avoid the anger of the inhabitants and any potential demonstrations, Ridwan arrested the city's notables and took them hostage. He forbade any citizen from approaching the walls and established special forces to protect them. The city gates remained closed for seventeen days, leading to three days of famine. The hatred for Ridwan in the city intensified to the point that he no longer went out and walked among the people for fear of assassination. As for the Seljuk army, it was a disaster, as the army found itself in the middle of hostile territory without any protection from the Crusader armies. Mawdud decided to head towards Maarrat al-Numan and reached it in late August 1111. On the way, the Seljuk army encountered the forces of Tughtekin, Emir of Damascus, who had answered the Sultan's call and joined the campaign. The Muslim commanders rejoiced at his arrival, and then they continued their march towards Maarrat al-Numan.

At Maarrat al-Numan, the Muslim leadership suffered heavy blows, beginning with the death of Sokman al-Kutbi, Shah of Ahlat, due to severe illness. His army withdrew from the campaign, and according to another account, he left because of the illnes and died en route in the city of Balis. Sokmen was not the only one afflicted with illness. Bursuq II of Hamadhan suffered from gout, which prevented him from moving; he even had to be carried on a stretcher if he wished to move around. Ahmadil, meanwhile, coveted the lands of the Shah-Armens and became preoccupied with his political ambitions. Tughtekin was disappointed in the commanders, with the exception of Mawdud, with whom he cultivated a close friendship. Tughtekin lost trust in some commanders after hearing that Ridwan was inciting them to betray him. He even began secretly negotiating with the Crusaders in case he was forced to abandon the campaign. Despite this, Tughtekin gave gifts to the campaign's leadership, including artifacts, Arabian horses, and fodder, for which the emirs expressed their gratitude. Tughtekin attempted to direct the commanders to attack Tripoli, promising them direct support from Damascus. Surjani believes he did this to draw them away from his realm, but they did not march anyway. In the end, Bursuq, Ahmadil, and the rest of the emirs withdrew and returned to their lands, and only Mawdud remained. Tughtekin went with him towards the Orontes River and crossed it then they camped in Jalali.

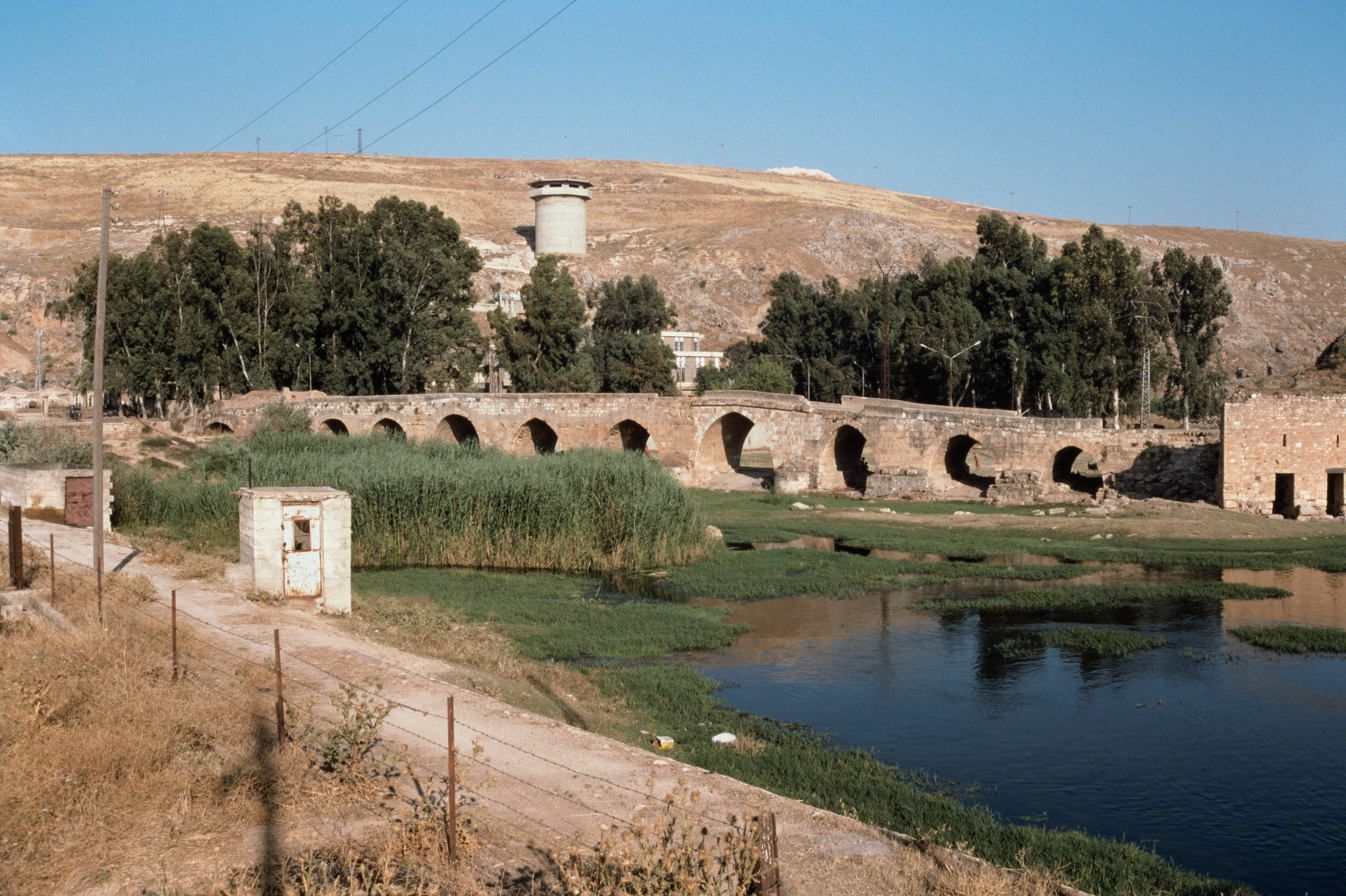
Modern day rural landscape of Shaizar

Sultan ibn Ali ibn Munqidh, the Emir of Shaizar, invited the Seljuk army to Shaizar. Indeed, Tughtekin and Mawdud arrived with their armies and encamped south of the city and established themselves in the fortress of Shaizar, receiving full support from Sultan ibn Munqidh. And in response to Tancred's plea for help, the forces of the Kingdom of Jerusalem, Principality of Antioch, County of Tripoli, and the County of Edessa assembled in early September 1111. The Crusader army numbered 16,000, and their confidence grew after hearing of the withdrawal of many Muslim leaders and their armies. After consolidating their forces, they encamped in the village of Apamea and then moved towards Shaizar, establishing their camp north of Tell Ibn Ma'shar.

=== Battle of Shaizar ===
Instead of engaging in direct battle, Mawdud and Sultan ibn Munqidh devised a plan to cut off the Crusaders' supplies. They dispatched light cavalry units to harass and skirmish the Crusaders, preventing them from reaching the Orontes River. They also ensured that many Muslim archers were positioned along the riverbanks. The Crusaders refused to be drawn into a fight, instead moving in a compact formation. When the Turkish horsemen pressed them hard, they fought back. Although both sides had similar cavalry, the Crusaders outnumbered the Seljuks, while the Seljuks had a larger cavalry force. The Seljuks managed to launch a raid on the Crusader camp, attacking from the west and looting some of it. However, this did not end the battle or break the Crusader defensive formation. After two weeks, in 29 September 1111, the Crusaders decided to withdraw. Mawdud, unwilling to continue the campaign, withdrew towards Hama and then returned to Mosul, while Tughtekin returned to Damascus.

== Aftermath ==
The Battle of Shaizar was the decisive battle of the campaign, but it ended in a draw, with neither side achieving a decisive victory. There was disappointment within the Muslim army due to the lack of spoils. Nevertheless, the Muslims celebrated the Crusaders' withdrawal, considering it a moral victory. The friendship between Mawdud and Tughtekin strengthened, and they would lead another campaign against the Crusaders the following year, culminating in a victory at the Battle of Sannabra. As for Sokman al-Kutbi, after his death, his body was placed in a coffin in the center of his army. However, the Shah-Arman' forces were attacked by Ilghazi and his Artuqid army, but the Shah-Armens managed to defeat them and safely retrieve the body to Ahlat.
