= Seljuk campaign against Edessa =

Seljuk campaign against Edessa may refer to:

- Seljuk campaign against Edessa (1110)
- Seljuk campaign against Edessa (1112)
- Seljuk campaign against Edessa (1115)
