= Seljuk campaign against Edessa (1110) =

Edessa Campaign (1110)
- Part of Seljuk–Crusader War
Date	May-July 1110
Location	County of Edessa
Result	Stalemate: Seljuk inconclusive victory against Crusaders in Euphrates; Seljuk failure in capturing Edessa
Territorial changes	Seljuk Empire retakes castles east of the Euphrates

Belligerents
Seljuk Empire: Emirate of Mosul; Shah-Armens; Artuqids of Mardin; Burid dynasty	Kingdom of Jerusalem; County of Tripoli; Principality of Antioch; County of Edessa; Raban and Kaysun

Commanders and leaders
Mawdud, Emir of Mosul; Sokmen al-Kutbi; Ilghazi; Tughtekin	Baldwin I of Jerusalem; Bertrand, Count of Tripoli; Tancred, Regent of Antioch; Baldwin II of Edessa; Joscelin of Coutrney; Kogh Vasil

The Seljuk campaign against Edessa was a military campaign that took place in the year 1110, by order of the Muhammad I Tapar, Sultan of the Seljuk Empire, led by the Emir of Mosul, Mawdud, and Shah Ahlat Sokmen against the Crusader state of Edessa.

== Background ==
In 1109, Sultan Muhammad I Tapar ordered Mawdud bin Altuntakin, Emir of Mosul, and Sokmen al-Qutbi, the Shah of Ahlat, to go and fight the Crusaders. So they mustered their armies and gathered in Jazirah, and there the rest of the armies in their emirates and a group of volunteers joined them, in addition to Ilghazi bin Artuq, the Emir of Mardin. The number of their soldiers was very high, so much so that Ibn al-Qalanisi described it as “a number that all the Franks could not meet.” This alliance decided to begin by attacking Edessa.

== Campaign ==
The campaign reached Edessa on 12 May 1110 and laid siege to the city, causing famine. Baldwin II, Count of Edessa, sent a plea for help to Baldwin I, King of Jerusalem, who was engaged in the Siege of Beirut. This message was carried by Joscelin of Courtenay, Lord of Turbessel, indicating its importance. Upon receiving news of the crisis, Baldwin contacted the leading Crusader commanders to prepare for a defense. Pons, Count of Tripoli, and Tancred, Regent of Antioch, joined forces with Baldwin's troops and marched to Edessa to rescue Baldwin II. Al-Sarjani's account states that Tancred initially refused to join the crusade due to disagreements with Baldwin of Bourcq, Count of Edessa.

The Crusaders faced many difficulties on their way. Shams al-Khawas, the Emir of Rafaniyya, attacked them, killing many. Zahir al-Dawla Tughtekin blocked the Euphrates River, preventing the Crusaders from crossing due to the Muslim forces deployed along its banks. When Mawdud learned of the Crusader advance, he decided to end the siege in late July 1110 and withdraw to Harran. There, he awaited the arrival of Tughtekin's forces to join him and open the way for the Crusaders to enter the plains east of the Euphrates. Tughtekin's armies reached Harran and joined Mawdud and Sokmen.

But Baldwin I understood the trick and realized the difficulty of penetrating Harran. Although Ibn al-Qalanisi confirmed that Tancred was with Baldwin from the beginning, al-Sarjani tells us that Baldwin invited Tancred to come, and under pressure, the latter left and joined King Baldwin. There, he settled the disputes and declared peace between Tancred and Baldwin of Bourcq. Kogh Vasil, the Armenian lord/prince of Raban and Kaysum, also joined him. When Mawdud learned of the increased strength of the Crusaders, he tried to lure them away from Edessa and Saruj, but he failed, as Baldwin I realized his trick. But then bad news reached the Crusaders, as news arrived of a possible Fatimid attack on the Kingdom of Jerusalem, and movements of Fakhr al-Mulk Ridwan, Sultan of Aleppo, towards some of the fortresses of Antioch belonging to Tancred. This news aroused the Crusaders’ fears for their principalities, and since there was nothing going in the war and no fighting had taken place, the Crusaders decided to withdraw. However, Baldwin I feared that if he withdrew, the Muslims would attack the villages of the Armenian Christians. Therefore, Baldwin issued a decision to evacuate all the Christian villages east of the Euphrates River, leaving only Edessa and Saruj, which were fortified enough to withstand a siege and defend themselves. Baldwin, Count of Edessa, left with Baldwin, King of Jerusalem, leaving Edessa in the administration of some Armenians.

But when the Crusader army began to transport Christian civilians across the Euphrates River, the Muslims attacked them, killing, drowning, and capturing many of them, and seizing large quantities of their supplies and weapons. After leaving half of his men with Mawdud, Tughtekin returned to Damascus. After that, the siege of Edessa was continued, but it was prolonged and supplies began to run low, so they left someone to watch over them, and the Muslim leaders returned to their countries.

== Aftermath ==
Although the victory of Mawdud and his allies on the Euphrates was not decisive, as most of the Crusader forces had already crossed the river, it boosted Muslim morale and helped them capture a number of fortresses east of the Euphrates, and for the Crusaders, they kind of succeeded in defending Edessa. Fakhr al-Mulk Ridwan also attacked the Principality of Antioch, reclaiming the territories it had taken from his principality (among these fortresses being the Hisn al-Atharib), acquiring much booty, and then returned to Aleppo as the Crusaders approached. It wasn't long before Tancred recaptured Atharib and launched his own raid on the suburbs of Aleppo. After this battle, a friendship developed between Mawdud ibn Altuntakin, the Emir of Mosul, and Zahir al-Dawla Tughtekin, the Emir of Damascus. These two men would later join forces in two campaigns against the Crusaders. However, the opposite occurred with Sokmen al-Qutbi, the Shah of Ahlat, and Ilghazi ibn Artuq, the Emir of Mardin. Sukman attacked Mardin, captured Balak ibn Bahram, Ilghazi's nephew, and brought him back to Ahlat. As for Baldwin II, he returned to Edessa after the Muslims left it, and the county continued to suffer Muslim raids.
