= Mawdud =

Ruler of Mosul (1109–1113) and military leader

- Emir, Emir of Mosul

Emir of Mosul
- Reign: September 1108 - 10 July 1113
- Predecessor: Jawali Saqawa
- Successor: Juyush Beg
- Died: 10 July 1113; Umayyad Mosque, Damascus
- Cause of death: Stabbing
- Burial: 11 July 1113; Debated burial location
- Spouse: Unnamed wife
- Issue: Unnamed children
- Father: al-Tuntakin or al-Tuntash
- Religion: Sunni Islam
- Military career
- Conflicts: Siege of Mosul (1108); Seljuk campaign on Edessa (1110); Seljuk campaign on the Crusaders (1111); Seljuk campaign on Edessa (1112); Seljuk campaign on the Crusaders (1113) X

Sharaf al-Dawla Mawdud ibn al-Tuntakin (Arabic: شرف الدولة مودود, romanized: Sharaf al-Dawla Mawdūd) was a Muslim military leader who was Emir of Mosul from 1109 to 1113. He is famed for organizing several expeditions to reconquer lands from the Crusaders.

== Biography ==
According to G. Fink and I. Demirkent, the origin of Mawdud is unclear. The place and date of the emir's birth are not recorded too. Mawdud was an officer of Muhammad I Tapar. The First campaign he was sent to was against a rebel in Persia named Jawali Saqawa, Mawdud besieged him for 8 months, before being placed with another commander, which was Jawali's term to surrender. But in April 1108, Jawali, who became Emir of Mosul, rebelled, so Muhammad I sent him with other Emirs to put Mosul under siege and restore it to the sultanate. When all the Emirs retreated from the siege after Muhammed ibn Qatlaghtekin told them to do so, he refused saying: I don't leave only if the sultan command. And later in September, some rebels inside the city opened one of the gates allowing Mawdud and his forces to enter. Thus, Mawdud assumed the office of Emir of Mosul, and took the Emirate which became part of his domain. Mawdud's soldiers and patros [sic?] even reached al-Rahbah where they clashed with Bedouins.

In 1110, Mawdud started his first campaign against the Crusaders, joined by Sokmen al-Kutbi, Shah of Ahlat, and Ilghazi, Emir of Mardin, and besieged Edessa, and Tughtekin, Emir of Damascus joined the campaign spreading defences on the Euphrates, Mawdud already lifted the siege and went to Harran and with Tughtekin leaving the Ephrates, the road was opened for the Crusaders towards a trap. But Baldwin I of Jerusalem didn't fall for it, and instead entered County of Edessa to strengthen his army, Mawdud's attempt to lure him failed again, but the Crusaders had to leave because of attacks on other fronts, and they brought the Christian population with them to not be left vulnerable for raids, but while crossing the river, they had been attacked in the rear by Mawdud, inflicting heavy losses on them, then Mawdud ended the campaign and returned to Mosul.

In 1111, demonstrations occurred in Baghdad demanding a serious action against the Crusader states in the Levant, so Sultan Muhammad commanded Mawdud and other Emirs to organize for Jihad, and sent his son Mas'ud, leader of the campaign, with Mawdud, who was the real leader, and after many Emirs joined their armies in Mosul, they set off towards Edessa and besieged it, then they sieged Turbessel, but after Ridwan, Sultan of Aleppo, sent a message pleading for help, Mawdud lifted the siege, getting attacked from the back by Joscelin of Courtnay and suffering heavy losses, and when they reached Aleppo, Ridwan closed the gates in their faces. Mawdud took the army and went to Ma'rra meeting Tughtekin on the way, but almost all the other participants in the campaign left, except for Tughtekin who remained with Mawdud, and this time, Sultan ibn Munqidh, Emir of Shaizar, asked them to help him against Crusaders, and so Mawdud and Tughtekin met the crusaders in Battle of Shaizar, which ended in a Crusader retreat and partial Seljuk victory, then Mawdud returned to Mosul.

In 1112, out of disappointment from his colleagues in the campaign of 1111, Mawdud decided to wage a war alone, invading the County of Edessa and looting its farms and harvest. But Joscelin took advantage of the Muslims’ dispersal in the countryside and attacked them by surprise, killing many of them, and when the Muslims prepared to fight him, he had withdrawn inside Suruc. An attempt to capture Edessa with the assistance of its Armenian population was discovered by then, and when the Muslim began entering the city, Joscelin came and defeated the Muslim attackers, forcing Mawdud to retreat towards Mosul.

In 1113, Tughtekin sought Mawdud's help against the Crusaders attacking his Emirate, so Mawdud set off to help him. Joined by Tumayrik ibn Arsalan Tash, Emir of Sinjar, and Ayaz of Mardin, they met in Salamiyah, then they invaded the Kingdom of Jerusalem. They pillaged Galilee and besieged Tiberias, though without being able to capture it. Then Mawdud set a trap in al-Aqhuwanah, which was Baldwin I's destination, and when the Crusaders came, the Battle of al-Sannabra happened, ending in a decisive Seljuk victory. The Crusaders scattered, taking refuge on a mountain, where the Muslims besieged them, but on 27 July 1113 Mawdud lifted the siege and raided the kingdom, then allowed his soldiers to return home, keeping a host with him, and went with Tughtekin to stay in Damascus for the winter.

=== Assassination and death ===
On Friday, and after Friday prayer, and while walking in the Umayyad Mosque, Mawdud was attacked and stabbed by an Assassin, though he wasn't instantly killed, and walked to the northern gate of the Mosque where he collapsed, the surgeon of Tughtekin couldn't help, and his death was announced in the next day. Accounts differ on where he was buried, but he ended up either in Mosul or Isfahan. Both Tughtekin and the Nizari Ismaili State are accused of being the masterminds of the assassination.

Regnal titles
Preceded by Jawali Saqawa	Emir of Mosul; 1108-1113	Succeeded by Juyush Beg
