= Al-Sinnabra =

Historic site on the Sea of Galilee

- Sinn en-Nabra
- Sennabris, Sinnabris
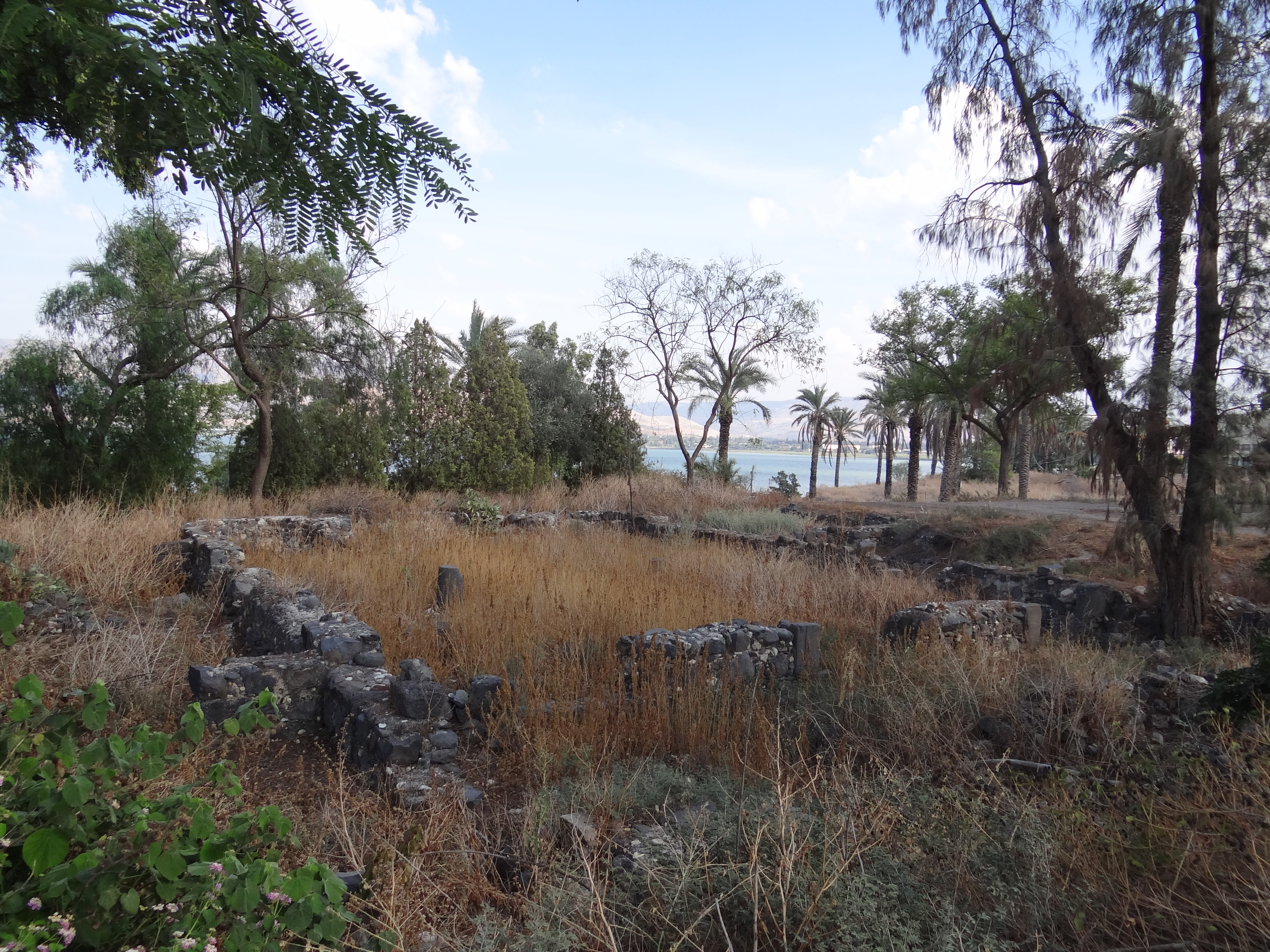

- Location within Israel
- 32.7180°N 35.5719°E
- Periods: Hellenistic - Crusader period
- Location: Israel

Site notes
- Archaeologists: Na'im Makhouly, Benjamin Mazar, Michael Avi-Yonah, Moshe Sheteklis, Emanuel Dunayevsky, Pesach Bar-Adon, P.L.O. Guy, Ruth Amiran, Rafi Greenberg

Al-Sinnabra or Sinn en-Nabra, is the Arabic place name for a historic site on the southern shore of the Sea of Galilee in modern-day Israel. The ancient site lay on a spur from the hills that close the southern end of the Sea of Galilee, next to which towards its south being the tell, Khirbet Kerak or Bet Yerah, one of the largest in the Levant, spanning an area of over 50 acres. Bet Yerah was the Hellenistic era twin city of Sennabris (Hebrew: צינבריי, סנבראי), as al-Sinnabra was known in Classical antiquity, and its remains are located at the same tell.

The city or village was inhabited in the Hellenistic, Roman-Byzantine, and early Islamic periods. An Arab Islamic palatial complex or qasr located there was also known as al-Sinnabra and served as a winter resort to caliphs in Umayyad-era Palestine (c. 650-704 AD). By the Crusader period, the qasr of al-Sinnabra was in ruins. Though the date of destruction for the village itself is unknown, by the Ayyubid period descriptions of the area mention only the "Crusader Bridge of Sennabris", constructed over the Jordan River which at the time ran to the immediate north of the village.

For decades, part of the palatial complex of al-Sinnabra was misidentified as a Byzantine Empire era (c. 330-620 CE) synagogue because of a column base engraved with a seven-branched candelabrum. This thesis was questioned by Ronny Reich in 1993. Donald Whitcomb suggested the complex was the qasr of al-Sinnabra in 2002, and excavations carried out in 2010 showed his analysis to be correct. Constructed in the 7th century by Mu'awiya and one of his successors, Abdel Malik, who also commissioned the building of the Dome of the Rock in the Old City of Jerusalem, it likely represents the earliest Umayyad complex of this type yet to be discovered.

== Name ==
In Greek (Hellenistic) sources the name is given as Sennabris, while in the Aramaic used in Talmudic sources it is referred to as Sinnabri, and is described as sitting alongside Bet Yerah.

The Arabic rendering of the name is al-Sinnabra or Sinn-en-Nabra.

== Location ==
Though described in the writings of early Arab historians, the precise location of al-Sinnabra had long been unknown. Josephus, the 1st-century Jewish historian, described Sennabris as the northernmost point of the Jordan valley, situating it some 30 stadia to the south of Tiberias. In Buldan, Yaqut al-Hamawi (1179–1229), the Syrian geographer, situated al-Sinnabra opposite 'aqabat Afiq (meaning "the Afeq pass"), 3 miles (4.8 km) from Tiberias.

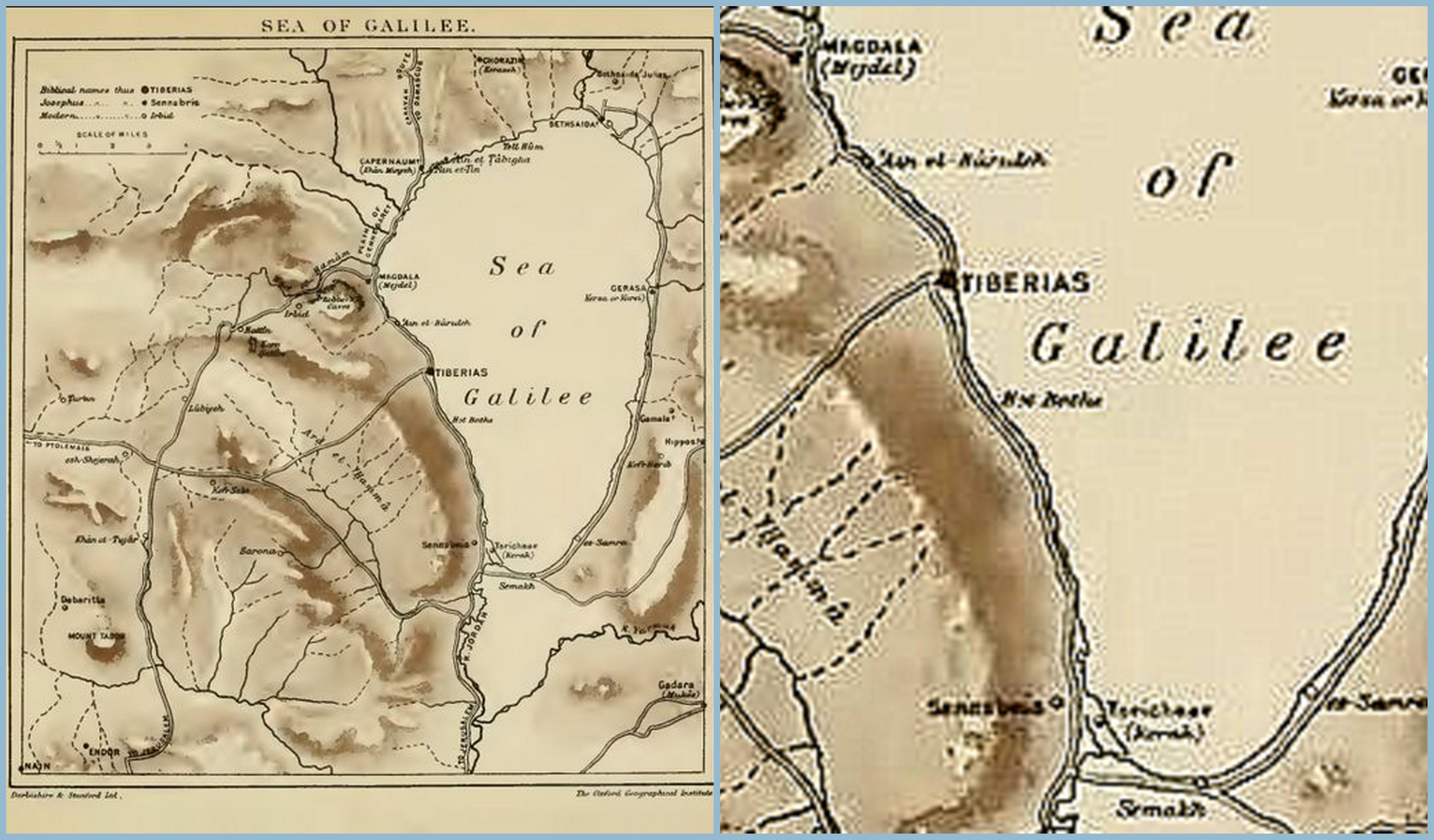
Location of Sennabris on 1903 map

Josef Schwarz, a rabbi who came to reside in Jerusalem in the 19th century, transliterated its name as it appears in the Talmud as Senabrai, and citing Josephus for its location, he noted that "Even at the present day there are found in this vicinity traces of ruins called by the Arabs Sinabri." A map of the area produced by the Palestine Exploration Fund around this time depicted Khirbet Sinn en-Nabrah to the immediate northwest of Khirbet Kerak, today's Kinneret village.

Al-Sinnabra's location is now confirmed to have been off the main Ramla-Beisan-Damascus highway about 6 kilometers (3.7 mi) south of Tabariyya (the Arabic name for Tiberias), a city that served as the capital of the el-Urdunn province under the Umayyad dynasty. It is situated on the tell of Khirbet Kerak (Arabic: Khirbet al-Karak, "the ruins of the castle") or Beth Yerah (Hebrew: בית ירח, "House of the Moon (god)"), which lies where the Sea of Galilee empties into the Jordan River and rises 15 meters above sea level. The Jordan river runs to the south, although it previously (until the medieval period at the earliest) ran north and west of it.

== History ==
=== Hellenistic period ===
In Hellenistic times, the city was known as Sennabris. Parts of the city walls from this period have been identified, and it is estimated that the wall (on the south and west of the tell) was at least 1600 meters long. The wall was built of piles of basalt, with bricks at the top and was strengthened by alternating rectangular and rounded towers with spiral staircases. Similar towers from this period have been found at Tel Zeror. A portion of the town discovered in the southern part of the mound included a street along which houses were built, one of which had a paved court around which were eleven rooms. Some of the houses facing the lake have survived to the height of the window sills.

=== Roman-Byzantine period ===
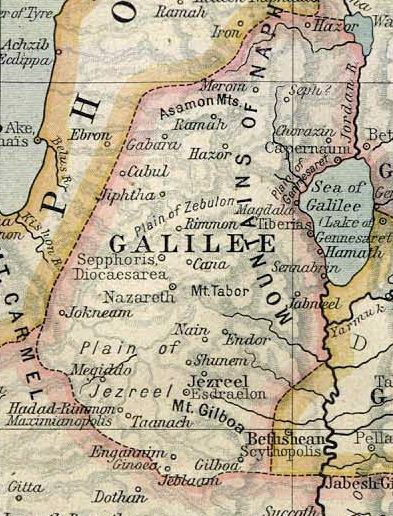
A depiction of the location of Sennabrin in the ancient Galilee, as recorded in The Historical Atlas (1923) by William R. Shepherd

According to Josephus, Vespasian encamped with three Roman legions in Sennabris, in preparation for an assault on Tarichaea. He describes it as a "village," but given the size of the Roman force stationed there, this seems to be an understatement. A fort was constructed at this time, probably by the builders of the Sixth Legion, as well as a road connecting Tiberias to Sennabris, via Bethsaida and Hippos.

According to the Jerusalem Talmud (Megillah 1:1 [2b]), both Sennabris and Bet Yerah once produced kinarīm, a word explained by Talmudic exegete Moses Margolies to mean "reeds", but by Jastrow to mean "Christ's thorn jujube."

A large Byzantine Empire era church was constructed in the village in 450 CE and underwent several renovations, the last of these dated to 529 CE. The church shows signs of renewed habitation in the early Islamic period, when it possibly served as a dar, or manor house.

=== Early Islamic period ===
The village gained importance under the rule of the Umayyad Caliphate. A qasr (Arab Islamic palatial complex) located in al-Sinnabra and known by the same name, served as a winter resort to Mu'awiya I (r. 640s–661 as governor of Syria, r. 661–680) as caliph), Marwan I (r. 684–685), and other caliphs in Umayyad Palestine (c. 650-704 AD). Mu'awiya I, the first Umayyad caliph, settled in al-Sinnabra, dividing his time in Palestine between his residence there and Jerusalem. Innovations he introduced to the palace structure at al-Sinnabra include the maqṣura, "a columned bay ... enclosed by a railing or screen" against which the caliph would lean to hear petitions from his subjects, and a mihrab associated with the apsidal form.

According to Whitcomb, the qasr is likely the earliest Umayyad complex of this type yet to be discovered. It differs from other qusur (pl. of qasr) in that there are no buyūt ("houses") arranged around a central courtyard, suggesting either a more urban design, such as that found at Anjar, or a more palatial one, like that at Qasr ibn Wardan. It is similar to other qusur in that it exhibits characteristics associated with the pre-Islamic building techniques used by Arab chieftains of the Byzantine era.

Later Umayyad caliphs also came to al-Sinnabra. Marwan I twice held council there: the first was in 684, while on his way from Damascus to Egypt, to address complaints from his loyalists; the second was on his return trip in 685 to designate his eldest son, Abd al-Malik, as his chosen successor and the governor of Palestine. Marwan may have remained there until his death later that year. Abd al-Malik (r. 685–705), who emulated many of Mu'awiya's practices, resided part of the year in Damascus and Baalbek, and would spend the winter season in al-Sinnabra and in al-Jabiya in the Golan, making it one of the four early capitals of the ruling Marwanid house of the Umayyad dynasty. He died in al-Sinnabra in 705. An Umayyad prince and former governor of Khurasan until 698, Umayya ibn Abdallah ibn Khalid ibn Asid, retired and died in al-Sinnabra during the reign of Abd al-Malik.

In 744, an army headed by Sulayman ibn Hisham, an Umayyad prince and general sent by Caliph Yazid III to quell resistance to his rule, reached al-Sinnabra, where the tribes of Urdunn came to pledge their loyalty to the caliph before him.

The site was apparently still in use in the 10th century; in 979 a meeting between Abu Taghlib (Fadlallah ibn al-Hasan) of the Hamdanid dynasty, and Fadl, son of Salih, a Jew who headed the Fatimid forces took place there.

=== Crusader period ===
During the Crusades, the army of Baldwin I, one of the leaders of the First Crusade, was defeated there in the Battle of Al-Sannabra in 1113 by the armies of Mawdud, the atabeg of Mosul who had formed an alliance with forces from Damascus. In the lead up to the Battle of Hittin in 1187, Saladin and his forces passed through and set up camp near the village, before moving on to command the roads around Kafr Sabt. The Umayyad qasr was in ruins by this time. In the dried out river bed where the river used to flow at this time, the remains of the "Crusader bridge of Sennabris" were found.

During the Crusader era al-Sinnabra was known as Senbra, and it was a casale under the Abbey of Tabor.

=== Ayyubid period ===
The exact date of the village's destruction is unknown, but it is thought that it did not survive beyond the period of Ayyubid rule (c. late 12th-early 13th centuries) as references to al-Sinnabra from this time mention only the bridge of the same name, without recalling the village.

== Excavations and identification ==
In 1946, in the northern quadrant of the tell, a fortified compound consisting of a series of large structures, including a bathhouse adjoined to a large apsidal hall decorated with colorful mosaics, was discovered just above the granary (AKA the Circles Building), an Early Bronze Age structure uncovered in previous excavations.

Between 1950 and 1953, P.L.O. Guy and Pesach Bar-Adon, two Israeli archaeologists excavated the compound, falsely identifying a building there as a 5th-6th century Palestinian synagogue, because of the presence of a column base engraved with a seven-branched candelabrum. The "synagogue" was incorporated into the Beth Yerah National Park which served as a popular tourist destination during the 1950s and 1960s, but has since been closed.

Excavations by the Oriental Institute of the University of Chicago in 1960 uncovered the Byzantine church (to the north of the compound). Questions were repeatedly raised about the identification of the structure to the south as a synagogue within a Roman era fort with attached bathhouse. Ronny Reich, a prominent Israeli archaeologist, disproved that thesis in 1993, without offering an alternate explanation as to its identity.

=== Correct identification ===
The compound, until 2002 identified as "Roman-Byzantine", was hypothesized to be the palace of al-Sinnabra by Donald S. Whitcomb of the Oriental Institute at the University of Chicago, after re-examining the plan and architectural features provided in the descriptions made by Israeli excavators. Noting the similarities between the features of the complex and those of Khirbat al-Mafjar, another Islamic era palace near Jericho, he suggested the site was one of the so-called desert castles (sing. qasr; pl. qusur) of the early Islamic Levant. By comparing this information against the descriptions provided in historical geography texts, Whitcomb determined that the complex at Khirbet Kerak was indeed the Arab Islamic palace of al-Sinnabra.

=== Dating ===
Whitcomb's thesis was confirmed following research conducted by Taufik De'adle of the Hebrew University and excavations undertaken by Israeli archaeologists headed by Raphael Greenberg from Tel Aviv University's Institute of Archaeology in 2010. Coins found at the site and its foundations indicate that the central building was built no earlier than 650 CE and that the bathhouse attached to the outer wall dates to the end of the 7th century. The foundations of the compound are made up of thick wall-stubs over two meters deep and provide an idea of the layout of the palace, the bathhouse and the wall and towers that surrounded them. The remains of water conduits and ceramic pipes from the bathhouse attest to the existence of a sophisticated water-distribution system, fed by an aqueduct.

Greenberg said that al-Sinnabra and other sites that are in the process of being similarly re-dated indicate an architectural continuity between the Roman and early Arab empires.

== See also ==
- Cities of the ancient Near East
- Desert castles
- Jerusalem, Temple Mount area: several possibly Umayyad palatial structures south (at the Ophel) and southwest of the Mount
- Qasr al-Minya, the other Umayyad qasr on the Sea of Galilee, Israel
