= Seljuk campaign against Edessa (1112) =

1112 military campaign in Mesopotamia

Mawdud's campaign on Edessa (1112)
- Part of Seljuk–Crusader War
Date	July–November 1112
Location	County of Edessa
Result	Crusader victory: Seljuk failure in capturing Edessa; Mawdud withdrews to Mosul

Belligerents
Seljuk Empire: Emirate of Mosul	County of Edessa: Lordship of Turbessel

Strength
Mawdud ibn Altuntakin, Emir of Mosul	Joscelin of Coutrney, Lord of Turbessel

The Seljuk campaign on Edessa was a military campaign that took place in the 1112, planned and led by the Emir of Mosul, Mawdud, against the Crusader state of Edessa.

== The campaign ==
After the failure of the 1111 campaign, one of the main reasons for which was the laziness of the Muslim leaders, Mawdud, Emir of Mosul, decided to move alone without anyone’s help. He began preparing his army for a new campaign in May 1112, and set out in July 1112 towards Edessa. Instead of attacking it, he seized its farms and looted its agricultural crops. Then he headed towards Suruc and did the same thing. Joscelin de Courtenay, Lord of Turbessel, took advantage of the Muslims’ dispersal in the countryside and attacked them by surprise, killing many of them. When the Muslims prepared to fight him, he had withdrawn inside Suruc. Mawdud returned to his soldiers in Edessa, who had made an agreement with the Armenians to surrender one of the fortresses on the eastern side of the city. They had indeed begun to infiltrate from it inside Edessa, but Joscelin came quickly and saved the situation, and Mawdud withdrew to Mosul.
