= Assassination of Mawdud ibn al-Tuntakin =

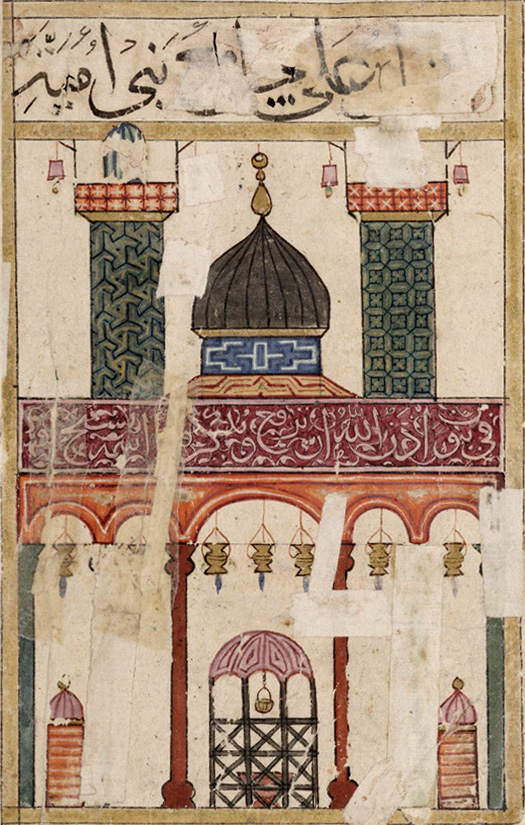
- A picture of the Umayyad mosque of Damascus, location of the Assassination, in Kitab al-Bulhan by Hassan Esfahani
- Location: Umayyad Mosque, Damascus, Burid Emirate
- Date: July 10, 1113; 913 years ago between 12:00 and 14:00
- Target: Mawdud ibn al-Tuntakin
- Attack type: assassination
- Weapon: Dagger
- Deaths: Mawdud ibn al-Tuntakin
- Perpetrator: Unknown Assassin

On Friday, October 10, 1113, Mawdud ibn al-Tuntkin, Emir of Mosul, was stabbed by an Assassin while walking in the Umayyad Mosque in Damascus, during a walk with Zahir al-Dawla Tughtekin, Emir of Damascus.

== Background ==
After the victory of Mawdud, Emir of Mosul, and his ally Tughtekin, Emir of Damascus, in the Battle of Al-Sannabra, they decided to end their campaign against the Kingdom of Jerusalem temporarily due to the distance of supplies, and withdrew towards Marj Al-Saffar. Then Mawdud allowed his soldiers to return to their countries to rest there and then return to complete the campaign in the spring, while Mawdud decided to stay in Damascus with a force throughout the winter. Mawdud entered Damascus in 26 August 1113, and camped in the fields near Bab Al-Hadid.

== Assassination ==
In 10 October 1113 (last friday in Rabi II), as was their custom, Mawdud and Tughtekin entered the Umayyad Mosque to perform the Friday prayer. After the prayer, Mawdud performed the Nawafil, then went out towards the mosque's courtyard, holding Tughtekin's hand according to Ibn al-Athir's account, or Tughtekin walking ahead of him as a sign of respect according to Ibn al-Qalanisi's account. They were accompanied by soldiers from the Daylam, Turks, and Khurasanis, Ahdath (local guards) and Silahiyah (heavily armed guards), carrying all kinds of weapons, including swords, daggers, and spears. The common people watched them and cheared for the two Emirs. When they reached the courtyard, as they were strolling, an Assassins approached Mawdud, pretending to be a beggar. He then grabbed the hem of his clothes and stabbed him twice below his navel, once in his waist and once in his thigh, according to Ibn al-Qalanisi. Ibn al-Athir, however, tells another tale, stating that the Assassin jumped on Mawdud and stabbed him four times once he entered the courtyard. Both accounts share the same ending: the guards immediately attacked the assassin with swords, beheading him.

== Aftermath ==
When the guards couldn't identify the assassin, they burned his body. Tughtekin, upon seeing Mawdud being stabbed, moved away slightly out of fear, surrounded by his guards, causing unrest in the city. Mawdud sustained fatal injuries but managed to walk a short distance, which reassured the people and led them to believe the assassination attempt had failed. However, Mawdud walked until he reached the northern gate of the mosque, where he collapsed. He was carried to Tughtekin's palace, accompanied by Zahir al-Dawla. Upon arrival, he was placed on a bed, and a surgeon was summoned. Although the external wounds were stitched, the internal injuries were more serious. Mawdud was also fasting that day, and Tughtekin tried to get him to eat, but Mawdud refused, saying, "I will not meet God except while fasting." A few hours later, Mawdud died from his wounds.

=== Mawdud's funeral and burial ===
The following day, Saturday 11 October 1113, after the Asr prayer, Mawdud was shrouded and buried. According to Ibn al-Qalanisi, he was buried in a shrine inside Bab al-Faradis in Damascus, while Ibn al-Athir states he was buried near the grave of Duqaq ibn Tutush. It is mentioned that everyone wept at the funeral. Later, the burial place was changed. According to Ibn al-Qalanisi, Mawdud remained buried there, and people visited his grave and recited the Quran over it until the end of Ramadan 507 AH / February and March 1114. Then his coffin was moved, and his body was handed over to his wife and children, most likely in Mosul. According to Ibn al-Athir's account, his body was taken to Baghdad, where he was buried next to Abu Hanifa al-Nu'man, and then it was moved to Isfahan.

=== The Seljuk Army ===
The assassination of Mawdud was the end of the Seljuk campaign, and Tamerek ibn Arslan Tash, Emir of Sinjar, took command of the Seljuk forces that accompanied Mawdud. Tughtekin provided them with everything they needed for the return journey, and handed over all of Mawdud’s possessions, including his belongings, money, and possessions, supposedly to be delivered to his family, or to the Sultan.

=== Reactions ===
Tughtekin, the people of Damascus, and its soldiers grieved deeply for Mawdud's death. Baldwin I, King of Jerusalem, was also curious and surprised by Mawdud's demise. He sent a message to Tughtekin stating, "a nation that kills its leader on its feast day in the house of its deity deserves to be destroyed by God." Despite this, the Crusaders rejoiced at his death, as Tughtekin lost his ally and was forced to return to a policy of peace with the King of Jerusalem. Furthermore, Mawdud had been a powerful military leader who launched annual campaigns against the Crusaders and achieved victories such as the Battle of the Euphrates and the Battle of Sannabra, thus ridding the Crusaders of a troublesome threat.

== Mastermind ==
After Mawdud's assassination, rumors spread accusing Tughtekin of the murder, and many in Damascus believed them. These rumors were propagated by Fakhr al-Mulk Ridwan, and Ibn al-Athir mentioned them as a possibility, suggesting that Tughtekin might have feared Mawdud's treachery and therefore had him killed. William of Tyre, Fulcher of Chartres and Albert of Aachen confirmed Tughtekin's responsibility, Other historians used the swift disposal of the body as evidence of Tughtekin's responsibility, while sultan Muhammad I Tapar directly accused Toghtekin of assassinating Mawdud, which led to future conflicts. However, some historians defended Tughtekin. Ibn al-Qalanisi and Ibn al-Jawziyya asserted that Tughtekin did not have a in the assassination Mawdud. Raghib Surjani and Imad al-Din Khalil stated that Tughtekin had a good relationship with Mawdud, and that even if he feared him, he needed him for protection against the Crusaders. Furthermore, Mawdud showed no signs of treachery and entered Damascus with a small delegation after the majority of his army had returned to Mosul. There is no real evidence to prove Tughtekin's responsibility.

On the other hand, there is another accused, namely the Nizari Ismaili state in Masyaf, especially since the killer was indeed one of the Assassins, which is certain. However, the mystery lies in the mastermind behind the assassination, or who paid the order to do the deed. It is possible that the Nizari assassinated him for their own reasons without needing anyone to send them, which is a very strong possibility. Ibn al-Athir included it as one of two possibilities for the identity of the mastermind behind Mawdud's assassination, and it was confirmed by Ibn al-Qalanisi and Ibn al-Jawziyya, especially since they are famous for assassinating major leaders and have previous incidents. Despite this, Surjani put forward several possibilities for who sent them, including Ridwan, who the Syriac Orthodox chronicler, Gregory Bar Hebraeus believes he was the mastermind, Ridwan was indeed an enemy of Mawdud in the past and was in contact and alliance with the Assassins, and the Crusaders, which is a small possibility. Surjani also indicated that it is not necessary that someone sent the Assassins, as they may most likely have assassinated him themselves.
