= Battle of al-Sannabra =

- Part of Seljuk–Crusader War and Seljuk campaign on the Crusaders (1113)
Date	30 June 1113
Location	al-Sannabra
Result	Seljuk victory

Belligerents
Seljuk Empire: Emirate of Mosul; Emirate of Damascus; Emirate of Sinjar; Emirate of Mardin	Kingdom of Jerusalem

Commanders and leaders
Mawdud ibn Altuntakin, Emir of Mosul; Tughtekin, Emir of Damascus; Tumayrik ibn Arsalan Tash, Emir of Sinjar; Ayaz ibn Ilghazi	Baldwin I of Jerusalem (POW)

Strength
A big and strong army	700 Knights; 4,000 Infantry

Casualties and losses
Unknown	1,000–2,000 killed

Battle of al-Sannabra, was a battle that occurred on 30 June 1113 between a Crusader army led by King Baldwin I of Jerusalem and a Muslim army commanded by Mawdud ibn Altuntash of Mosul.

== Background ==
Baldwin I, King of Jerusalem, began launching raids on the province of Al-Bathaniyya, south of Damascus, which led to the cutting off of roads, a decrease in agricultural crops, and high prices. So Tughtekin, Emir of Damascus, sent a request for help from Mawdud, explaining to him what had happened and asking him to cooperate against the Crusaders so that they might gain the merit of jihad, Mawdud agreed.

== Seljuk campaign on the Crusaders (1113) ==
After Mawdud resolved his problem with Sultan Muhammad I Tapar, he gathered his forces, composed of Turks and Kurds, and headed towards the Levant. On the way, he was joined by Tamerk ibn Arslan Tash, Emir of Sinjar, and Ayaz ibn Ilghazi. Fakhr al-Mulk Ridwan, Sultan of Aleppo, promised to send soldiers later. Mawdud and his allies reached the Euphrates River and crossed it in April–May 1113. When Joscelin de Courtenay (who became Prince of Tiberias and Galilee after he had a problem with his uncle Baldwin II, Count of Edessa) learned of this, he tried to negotiate with Tughtekin and offered him friendly relations and an exchange of the fortress of Thamanin for the fortress of al-Habis, promising that the King of Jerusalem would abide by the agreement, but Tughtekin refused.

Mawdud and Tughtekin met in the city of Salamiyah, southeast of Hama. Tughtekin brought with him soldiers from Homs, Hama, and Raphanea, and they decided to confront Baldwin I. They marched towards Qadas, then Ain al-Jar, then Wadi al-Taym, and finally Banias. They also sent a detachment to attack the fortress of al-Thamanin, but it failed. The Muslim army later advanced and besieged Tiberias, but they failed to capture it. Baldwin continued his raids on Damascus, and he was joined by Roger of Salerno, Regent of Antioch, and Pons, Count of Tripoli. When Mawdud learned of the Crusader forces' approach, he advanced towards al-Aqhuwanah (present-day al-Baqoura) and set a dangerous ambush for Baldwin at the al-Sanabra Bridge. The Crusaders planned to march towards al-Sanabra Bridge and cross it to al-Aqhuwanah to encamp there. As a precaution, they would leave their army's provisions, wagons, and tents on the northern bank. If they were defeated, they would withdraw across the bridge and protect their possessions from the Muslims. They even tried to move along an alternate route to attempt to surprise the Muslims.

== The battle ==
The Muslims had encamped at al-Aqhuwana before the Crusaders. When some Turks crossed the bridge to gather fodder and harvest crops, they found that the Crusaders had encamped on the other bank of the river. Baldwin had arrived and set up his camp first, with 700 knights and 4,000 soldiers. Roger and Pons had not yet joined him. Alarms were raised in the Muslim camp, and the soldiers rushed to arms and went out to fight, believing that the camp was led by Joscelin, as he was the Prince of Tiberias. Mawdud stood on the bridge to organize the attackers. A large number of soldiers crossed, including a strong contingent led by Tamerk ibn Arslantash. The battle broke out suddenly on 30 June 1113, before either side had settled down or planned for the coming battle. Another account says that Mawdud feigned a retreat and succeeded in luring Baldwin I into a trap and striking him. After three attacks, the Muslims were victorious in the battle, and about two thousand Crusaders were killed, many of whom drowned in the Jordan River, including 30 knights, and the Muslims seized the Crusader camp and its church. Baldwin was taken prisoner, but the Muslims did not recognize him. He later escaped after losing his royal banner and tent. The survivors of the Crusader army withdrew towards Tiberias, most of them wounded.

Siege of Mount Tiberias
- Part of Seljuk–Crusader War and Seljuk campaign on the Crusaders (1113)
Date	1–27 July 1113
Location	Hills and Highlands near Lake Tiberias
Result	Seljuk retreat

Belligerents
Seljuk Empire: Emirate of Mosul; Emirate of Damascus; Emirate of Sinjar; Emirate of Mardin; Arab tribes: Tayy; Kilab; khafaja; Seljuk Sultanate of Aleppo	Kingdom of Jerusalem; County of Tripoli; Principality of Antioch

=== Siege of Mount Tiberias ===
After the Crusaders withdrew, they encamped at Tiberias and there the armies from Antioch and Tripoli joined them, criticizing their haste. The following day, 1 July 1113, a Seljuk force marched towards Tiberias and ascended a mountain overlooking the Crusader camp. They considered attacking but spent the entire day grazing without engaging before withdrawing. The Crusaders seized the opportunity, capturing the mountain and using it as a defensive position due to its rugged terrain. However, it lacked water. The Muslims decided to attack the mountain, and Mawdud requested reinforcements from the Tayy, Kilab, and Khafaja tribes. They arrived with leather water skins and containers loaded on camels. Reconnaissance units were sent to survey the mountain from the north, but they concluded that an attack was impossible. The terrain was too treacherous, cavalry was unsuitable, and even infantry would struggle. After assessing the situation, the commanders abandoned the idea of storming the mountain, especially since they were victorious and the balance of power was in their favor. Instead, they besieged the Crusaders, waiting for their supplies to run out so they could try to leave, but they did not. The Muslims shot arrows and spears at them from the bottom. During the siege, Ridwan's forces arrived, consisting of 100 soldiers. This angered Tughtekin and Mawdud because Ridwan did not participate seriously, and they canceled their plans to pledge allegiance to him as Sultan. Mawdud sent news of the victory and the spoils of the battle to Muhammed I. The siege of the Crusaders continued for twenty-six days until 27 July 1113.

== Aftermath ==
After ending the siege, the Muslims withdrew towards Beisan and looted everything between Acre and Jerusalem until supplies were cut off from them, so they left the Kingdom of Jerusalem for good and headed towards Marj al-Saffar, where the soldiers returned to their countries. Mawdud went with Tughtekin to Damascus, where he was assassinated.
