= Military history of the Crusader states =

The military history of the Crusader states begins with the formation of the County of Edessa in 1097 and ends with the loss of Ruad in 1302, the last Christian stronghold in the Holy Land.

== War with the Seljuks ==
The Seljuk–Crusader war began when the First Crusade wrested territory from the Seljuk Turks during the Siege of Nicaea in 1097 and lasted until 1128 when Zengi became atabeg of Aleppo. At the latter date, the chief threat to the Crusaders from the east and north became the Zengids. The conflict was generally fought between European Crusaders and the Seljuk Turks and their vassals. The Muslim Syrian emirates occasionally allied themselves with the Christians against rival states.

=== First Crusade ===
In 1097 the Crusaders captured Nicaea from its Seljuk garrison, advancing from there into Anatolia. In the Battle of Dorylaeum the main Seljuk Turkish army was defeated. In 1097 the Frankish host besieged Antioch which fell in 1098. They successfully repelled an army sent by the Seljuk Sultan in Baghdad. The bulk of the Latin army moved on, capturing Ma'arrat al-Numan.

After the siege many of the local emirs cooperated with the Christians in the hope that they would move on and attack the territory of another ruler. The Crusaders soon moved beyond Seljuk territory and went on to capture Jerusalem from the Fatimids in the Siege of Jerusalem.

=== Crusader setbacks 1100–1104 ===
The Crusader successes suddenly came to an end when Bohemond I of Antioch was captured by the Danishmend Turks in the Battle of Melitene in 1100. The Crusade of 1101 ended in disaster when three separate Crusader columns were ambushed and annihilated by Seljuk armies in central Anatolia. Some of the commanders survived, but most of the foot soldiers and camp followers were enslaved or slaughtered. A decisive Crusader defeat at the Battle of Harran in 1104 "permanently ended Frankish expansion towards the Euphrates."

=== Crusader consolidation 1105–1109 ===
In 1105, Toghtekin of Damascus sent a Turkish force to help Fatimid Egypt, but the combined force was defeated in the Third Battle of Ramla. That year in the Battle of Artah, the Principality of Antioch under Tancred won a victory over Fakhr al-Mulk Radwan of Aleppo and put the city on the defensive. The seven-year Siege of Tripoli ended in 1109 when the port fell and became the capital of the County of Tripoli.

=== Seljuk counterattack 1110–1119 ===
Beginning in 1110, Sultan Muhammad I of Baghdad ordered counter-attacks on the Crusader states for six years. In 1110, 1112, and 1114 the city of Edessa was targeted; Galilee was invaded in 1113, and in 1111 and 1115 the Latin possessions east of the Orontes between Aleppo and Shaizar."

In the Battle of Shaizar (1111) King Baldwin I of Jerusalem fought the army of Mawdud of Mosul in an extended skirmish around the walls of Shaizar. Mawdud defeated Baldwin's army at the Battle of Al-Sannabra in 1113. After a protracted campaign, the army of Bursuq ibn Bursuq of Hamadan was routed by Roger of Salerno's army in 1115 at the Battle of Sarmin. The Seljuk successor states continued the war against the Frankish states.

Najm ad-Din Ilghazi ibn Artuq's army destroyed the Antiochene field army and killed Roger of Salerno at the Battle of Ager Sanguinis in June 1119. Baldwin II of Jerusalem repaired the situation by rapidly reinforcing Antioch with forces from the Kingdom of Jerusalem and the County of Tripoli, winning the Battle of Hab that August.

=== Crusader consolidation 1120–1128 ===
In 1124 Tyre fell to the Crusaders. In 1125, the Crusaders triumphed at the Battle of Azaz, putting Aleppo back on the defensive. However, although the Crusaders were victorious in the field at the Battle of Marj al-Saffar in 1126, their casualties were significant enough that they were unable to capture Damascus.

== War with the Zengids ==
The war with the Zengids began when Zengi assumed the rule of Aleppo in 1128 and ended when his son Nur ad-Din, the ruler of Aleppo and Damascus, died in 1174. Though the Zengids were technically Seljuks, they represented a menace to the Crusader states in their own right.

=== Imad-ud-din Zengi ===
In 1127, Imad-ud-din Zengi was confirmed as atabeg of Mosul by the Seljuk Sultan Mahmud II. When he also became ruler of Aleppo the following year, the combined resources of the two cities made him a major threat to the Crusader states. However, Zengi first intrigued against the emirates of Homs and Damascus.

In 1135, Imad-ud-din Zengi moved against the Latin Principality of Antioch. When the Crusaders failed to put an army into the field to oppose him, he captured the Syrian towns of Atharib, Zerdana, Ma'arrat al-Numan and Kafr Tab. He defeated King Fulk of Jerusalem in 1137 at the Battle of Ba'rin. Afterward, he seized Ba'rin castle which the Crusaders never recovered. In 1138, he helped repel a Frankish–Byzantine attack on Shaizar. Because of his continued efforts to seize Damascus, that city sometimes allied itself with the Latin Kingdom of Jerusalem.

The crowning achievement of Imad-ud-din Zengi's career occurred when he moved against the Christian state of Edessa when the bulk of its forces were campaigning elsewhere. In the Siege of Edessa he stormed and captured that city. The western portion of the County of Edessa remained in Crusader hands for only a few more years before being extinguished.

Zengi was assassinated by a Frankish slave in 1146. He was succeeded in Aleppo by his second son Nur-ud-din Zengi, while his eldest son Saif ad-Din Ghazi I inherited Mosul.

=== Nur-ud-din Zengi ===
Nur-ud-din Zengi crushed a brief attempt by the Franks to reoccupy Edessa in 1146. The following year, he helped a rival city, Damascus, repel a Crusader expedition in the Battle of Bosra. In 1148, the Second Crusade was forced to lift the Siege of Damascus when the armies of Nur-ud-din Zengi and his brother Saif appeared in the vicinity. He annihilated the army of Antioch at the Battle of Inab in 1149.

Nur-ud-din Zengi became overlord of Mosul in 1149. He conquered the rest of the County of Edessa soon after the Battle of Aintab in 1150. For the next few years, he turned his attention to Damascus, except when he briefly seized the Crusader port of Tortosa in 1152. In a coup, he finally seized control of Damascus in 1154. For several years afterward he became involved in the affairs of Mosul. In 1157, he defeated the Franks at the Battle of Lake Huleh.

In 1163, King Amalric of Jerusalem began the Crusader invasions of Egypt against the disintegrating Fatimid Caliphate. To counter this, Nur-ud-din Zengi sent his own forces to intervene in the Fatimid civil war. That year, he was defeated at the Battle of al-Buqaia in Syria. In 1164 he won a great victory over the Crusaders at the Battle of Harim and went on to capture Banias. In Egypt, his general Shirkuh won the Battle of al-Babein in 1167, but the war dragged on. Shirkuh triumphed in 1169, but died soon after.

Shirkuh was succeeded by his lieutenant Saladin, thus uniting all the Zengid territories into a vast empire. But the new ruler of Egypt refused to act as Nur-ud-din Zengi's vassal. Saladin proclaimed himself Sultan in 1171 and founded the Ayyubid dynasty. Nur-ud-din Zengi planned to move against the upstart but died in 1174. With his death, the Zengid empire fell apart.

== Wars with Fatimid Egypt ==
The war with Fatimid Egypt began when the First Crusade invaded Fatimid territory and started the Siege of Jerusalem in 1099. Soon after, the Crusaders stormed and captured the city. The war between the newly established Latin Kingdom of Jerusalem and Fatimid Egypt continued until Saladin became the effective ruler of Egypt in 1169.

=== Jerusalem ===
Fatimid Egypt had no sooner captured Jerusalem from the Seljuks when the First Crusade appeared from the north. On July 15, 1099, the Crusaders successfully stormed the city and violently sacked it.

The Crusaders crushed an early attempt by the Fatimids to recover the holy city by winning the Battle of Ascalon in 1099. The Egyptians were nevertheless able to hold onto the key fortress, which served as a launching point for raids on the newly established Kingdom of Jerusalem until 1153 when it fell in the Siege of Ascalon.

=== Fatimid counterattack ===
The capable vizier of Egypt, Al-Afdal Shahanshah, mounted a series of campaigns "almost annually" against the Crusader kingdom from 1100 to 1107. Egyptian armies fought three major Battles of Ramla in 1101, 1102 and 1105, but they were ultimately unsuccessful. After this, the vizier contented himself by launching frequent raids on Frankish territory from his coastal fortress of Ascalon. In 1121, al-Afdal was assassinated.

The new vizier, Al-Ma'mum, organized a major invasion of Crusader lands. This came to grief at the Battle of Yibneh in 1123. To protect against the raids from Ascalon, the Crusaders began encircling the strategic port with a ring of castles. Built between 1136 and 1149, the strongholds were at Ibelin (Yibneh) 20 miles northwest of Ascalon, Blanchegarde (Tell es-Safi) 15 miles east-northeast, Beth Gibelin (Bait Jibrin) 18 miles east, and Gaza 12 miles south-southwest.

=== Fatimid weakness ===
After the fall of Ascalon, Egypt ceased to be a threat to the Crusader states until the rise of Saladin. The Fatimid rule broke apart into warring factions. From 1163 to 1169, Egypt became the prize of a struggle between King Amalric of Jerusalem and Nur ed-Din of Syria as the Fatimid factions invited one side or the other to intervene in their civil war.

In 1169, Nur ed-Din's general, Shirkuh seized Cairo for the last time and proclaimed himself ruler of Egypt. He died suddenly two months later and Nur ed-Din appointed Shirkuh's young nephew Saladin as his successor. As directed by his sponsor, Saladin ruthlessly stamped out Shi'ite Islam in Egypt, which had flourished under the Fatimids. But, instead of acting as Nur ed-Din's vassal, Saladin consolidated power in his own hands. He deposed the last Fatimid caliph in 1171.

=== Crusader armies ===
A typical Crusader army consisted a core of heavy cavalry (knights) in chainmail wielding lances and swords. These were backed by a much more numerous body of infantry armed with bows and spears. The charge of the Frankish heavy cavalry developed tremendous shock power. With a bit of hyperbole, the contemporary Byzantine scholar Anna Comnena noted that a Frank on horseback would "make a hole through the walls of Babylon." The knights were sometimes joined by mounted squires or turcopoles who were less heavily armed. While the Crusader cavalry represented the main offensive force in battle, they "would have been absolutely useless had they not been supported by the infantry."

Often, the infantry opened the battle with a volley of arrows, with the horsemen in the rear. When an opportunity for a successful charge appeared, the infantry would open ranks to allow the mailed cavalry to advance. If the horsemen suffered a reverse, they could fall back behind the foot soldiers. The Frankish infantry had considerable defensive power, but it could not hold out for long if unsupported by their heavy cavalry.

=== Fatimid armies ===
Egyptian armies of the period relied on masses of Sudanese bowmen supported by Arab and Berber cavalry. Since the archers were on foot and the horsemen awaited attack with lance and sword, a Fatimid army provided exactly the sort of immobile target that the Frankish heavy cavalry excelled in attacking. Except for the third battle of Ramleh in 1105, when Toghtekin of Damascus sent a contingent of Seljuk Turks to help the Egyptians, the Fatimids did not use horse archers.

Whereas the Crusaders developed a healthy respect for the harass-and-surround tactics of the Turkish horse archers, they tended to discount the effectiveness of the Egyptian armies. While overconfidence led to a Crusader disaster at the second battle of Ramleh, the more frequent result was a Fatimid defeat. "The Franks never, until the reign of Saladin, feared the Egyptian as they did the armies from Muslim Syria and Mesopotamia."

== Wars with the Ayyubids ==
The Ayyūbid-Crusader Wars began when truces attempted in the aftermath of The Zengid-Crusader Wars and Fatimid-Crusader Wars and their likes ended up violated by those such as Sir Reynald de Châtillon, Master Edessa Count Joscelin de Courtenay III, Grand Masters of the Knights Templar Sir Odo de St Amand, along with later on Knighthoods Templar Order Grandmaster Sir Gérard de Ridefort and by religious fanatics including newly arrived ones from Europe, and by attempts by ones like Salāḥ ad-Dīn Ayyūb, his Ayyubid dynasty and their Saracen Armies who, after they became leaders in succession to Nur ad-Din had vowed to punish those like Sir Reynald and to perhaps reclaim Jerusalem for the Muslims. Crusader victories included the battles of Montgisard and Belvoir Castle, as well as the two Sieges of Kerak Castle, whilst the Battle of Marj Ayyun, Siege of Jacob's Ford, Battle of Cresson, Battle of Hattin and Siege of Jerusalem (1187) were won by the armies of the Ayyūbīd dynasty and Salāḥ ad-Dīn Ayyūb, leading to the Third Crusade.

== War of the Lombards ==
The War of the Lombards (1228–1242) was a civil war in the Kingdom of Jerusalem and the Kingdom of Cyprus between the "Lombards" (also called the imperialists), the representatives of the Emperor Frederick II, largely from Lombardy, and the native aristocracy, led first by the Ibelins and then by the Montforts. The war was provoked by Frederick's attempt to control the regency for his young son, Conrad II of Jerusalem. Frederick and Conrad represented the Hohenstaufen dynasty.

== Crusader forces ==
The army of the First Crusade that arrived in Asia Minor in 1097 was a type of armed pilgrimage. A prior expedition, the People's Crusade, made up of peasants and low-ranking knights arrived in Asia Minor in August 1096, but was decisively defeated by Seljuk forces in October. The later force called the Prince's Crusade, which succeeded in taking Jerusalem and started the Crusader states, was representative of European armies. Crusader armies contained heavy cavalry, infantry and ranged troops such as archers or crossbowmen. The original leadership was generally made up of high-ranking knights from modern-day France and Belgium. Later on, other Western European monarchs participated such as Frederick I, Holy Roman Emperor from the Holy Roman Empire and Richard I of England in the Third Crusade of 1189–1192. The long distance to the Middle East and the difficulty in crossing often hostile territory resulted in the Crusader forces being relatively outnumbered by the surrounding pre-existing nations. There were regular calls for reinforcements from the Crusader states attempting to alleviate this problem. Several calls resulted in new Crusades.

=== Tactics ===
Tactics followed by Crusaders varied according to the commander at the time and depended on the strengths of the different armies. The Crusaders were generally less mobile than their foes especially the Seljuk Turks who regularly used horse archers. However, the Crusader heavy cavalry had a powerful charge that could and did turn many battles. Where records are available several common threads on tactics may be found. Surprise attacks and ambushes were common and generally effective and were used by both the Crusaders and their enemies. Examples of surprise attacks included the battles of Dorylaeum(1097), Ascalon (1099) and Lake Huleh (1157). Against horse archers such as those used by the Seljuks, running battles were common. In these instances, the Crusaders kept in close marching formation while being harassed by mobile horse archers. Generally the forces opposing the Crusaders were unable or unwilling to attempt breaking the formation. This type of battle usually resulted in no clear result. Examples of running battles include the battles of Bosra (1147) and Aintab (1150). This use of relatively heavily armoured troops to shield the less armoured foot soldiers and archers was also seen in the formation used by Bohemund of Taranto during the Battle of Dorylaeum (1097). Although often no clear result appeared in running battles, there could be a chance for the Crusaders to charge into unprepared and disorganised enemy forces after some time had passed. This could result in a decisive victory, as happened in the Battle of Arsuf (1191) although it was not part of the original battle plan. Against the Fatimid forces, which used foot archers and light melee cavalry, the Crusaders could use their heavy cavalry more effectively, achieving decisive results. This can be seen in the first and third battles of Ramla. In the Second Battle of Ramla, faulty intelligence had resulted in the near-destruction of a small Crusader force.

These tactics were dictated by the forces on hand. The more well-off Crusader troops, such as the knights, were individually superior in a melee to any cavalry in the area at the time, and were relatively immune to arrows due to their armour. Nonetheless, they tended to be ill-disciplined in the face of arrow volleys. The Seljuks attempted to use this on several occasions to draw small groups of cavalry away from the main body where they could be destroyed piecemeal by superior numbers. An example of a tactical retreat by lightly armoured Seljuk cavalry leading to a tactical advantage and a surrounded Crusader force was at the Battle of Azaz (1125). An alternative or supporting tactic to feigned retreats that was used by the Seljuks and others was harassing the Crusader line to disorganise it and leave it open to a cohesive cavalry charge. Crusader generals would have needed to be careful to maintain discipline in the face of losses from arrows and to keep heavy cavalry reserves to repel probing attacks. Note that this analysis is only drawn from examination mainly of some battles between 1097 and the mid 12th century, and so does not include the tactics of the entire Crusader period which only truly ended in 1302.

The two famous crusader orders, the Knights of Saint John and Knights Templar, fought similarly and a lot like most other Knights, except the Templars would tend to be a more aggressive force (even outside the crusader kingdom such as in the Reconquista). As a result, they suffered more casualties; indeed the order was almost destroyed several times throughout the Crusades period such as at the Horns of Hattin. They would also take part in many defences in the crusader kingdom such as Antioch and finally Acre committing to many sallies in last-ditch efforts to deny the cities to the enemy. Also, they held some of the strongest castles in the kingdom, for example Krak des Chevaliers, which was primarily controlled by the Knights of Saint John.

=== Strengths ===
Crusading soldiers wore armour far heavier than their Saracen counterparts. The only effective defensive method of defeating the hit and run tactics launched by the Saracens was to form a shield wall and hope that the armour one wore was thick enough. Crossbowmen and or archers could then fire their own missiles from the safety of the shield wall. To counter the heat, many knights wore a surcoat underneath their armour to insulate against the metal which under the heat of the sun, would have burned their skin. Later, the Saracens employed heavier troops, but since most soldiers came from the local population of the levantines, these would not have naturally worn much armour. As such, the Crusaders were often of a heavier type than their enemies and few of their enemies could withstand a heavy cavalry charge unless the cavalry were seriously outnumbered.

The crusaders were also a very determined band of soldiers, bearing the heat of a foreign land, and surviving on minimal amounts of water (and in the case of the First Crusade, minimal amounts of food). Many would have had to have travelled either by land which was exhausting at best, or else by sea, whereby many of their comrades would have died or been lost in storms. Those few that arrived were the best, and crusader soldiers were at least as determined as their opponents were. A classical example is the Siege of Antioch where the crusaders, though outnumbered, were inspired and eventually drove of a larger army of Seljuk Turks. Many have argued that the cause of victory was due to factional infighting between the various Turkish tribes within the army, as opposed to the Christian zeal inspired by the Lance of Longinus that was supposedly found in the city.

At times the Crusaders could be a large force. Under Richard the Lionheart, there were some 40,000 men under his command at the height of the Third Crusade. There may well have been many more, but the Holy Roman Emperor's enormous army broke apart after his death.

Crusader castles allowed the Christian invaders to secure their beachhead in the Levant. Building many fortifications, which were well-supplied with water and food, they could hold out almost indefinitely, unless supply was cut, the enemy infiltrated the fort such as Krak des Chevaliers or a big enough force was marshaled against them in a siege such as by Saladin, who only captured Jerusalem after destroying the Crusader army at Hattin. After the crusader period, this occurred at Constantinople itself. Pitched battles were avoided as often as possible, unless the political situation called for it, due to problems with manpower, logistics and the impracticability of marching armoured soldiers in such a hot climate.

=== Weaknesses ===
The Crusaders were at times poorly united and their tactics lacked flexibility. The Crusading soldiers were also not very disciplined.

Often, the actions of Crusader armies were not beneficial to their cause of aiding their powerful and uneasy allies, the Byzantine Christians. The Byzantines, dubious of Crusader usefulness, even went so far as to make a deal with Saladin: when Holy Roman Emperor Frederick Barbarossa marched his enormous army towards Jerusalem, the Byzantine emperor promised to delay the crusaders in return for Saladin not attack the Byzantine Empire. The sacking of the Hungarian city of Zara, and the capture of Constantinople in 1204 were some of the main factors behind the fall of Byzantium.

The key to surviving against their numerous opponents was to keep them from uniting. The Crusaders were able to make a few alliances with various Saracen factions. In Spain, the initially powerful Moors were greatly weakened by civil war and various city states with little or no allegiance to each other. The few Christian kingdoms in Northern Spain were able to stay a few in number (and hence mainly united), even as they conquered more land.

Reinforcing a Crusader army was difficult at best. Troops were brought from Europe but these would often have their own orders led by their own leaders, often with conflicting interests. The Second Crusade demonstrates this, when a large Crusader army failed to capture Damascus after a row broke out between the commanders (who were of different origins) as to who should rule the city, even though the city had not even fallen at the time (and consequently did not). Since troops were being brought over from such a long distance, Crusader leaders feared that one would plot against the other back in Europe, something that their Saracen counterparts had little worry of considering that their lands were already occupied. Their fears were not unfounded, as in the cases of Richard the Lionheart, whose half brother plotted against him, and the Austrian emperor Leopold, who had Richard captured and ransomed.

At the Battle of Hattin, a large crusader army was annihilated when it was ambushed searching for a source of water. The lack of local knowledge resulted from poor intelligence-gathering.

Conscription was limited at best. At the time of the Siege of Jerusalem, there were some 60,000 refugees wishing to flee that Saladin gave a paid passage to. So whilst some people from Europe, or local Christians may have swelled the city and hence had the potential to raise a militia force, it was not enough. At the siege of Acre, the crusaders amounted to 15,000 men, a small force compared to the typical army of 40,000 to 80,000 deployed by the Saracens. As a result, the Saracens had a seemingly unlimited supply of men, whilst the crusaders struggled to man their walls during the latter periods in the late thirteenth centuries.

After the First Crusade, many of the veteran soldiers who won the Battle of Ascalon left, believing that their mission was accomplished. Often, some crusades were nothing more than raids, like the Fourth Crusade. This only aggravated the local Saracens, uniting them in their desire to drive the Crusaders from their holdings.

=== Impact of the Crusader armies ===
After the Battle of Manzikert, the Byzantines suffered a crushing defeat against the Turks, seeing much land lost. The Byzantine emperor Alexios I Komnenos called for mercenaries from the West for help in combating the Turks. In response, Pope Urban II at the council of Clermont declared an armed pilgrimage to the Holy land. The resulting Crusaders aided Byzantium so greatly that by 1143, the death of John II Komnenos, the Byzantine empire was once more a superpower and the Crusaders had control of a sizable piece of the Levant along with Jerusalem, which did not fall until 1187.

Large numbers of Crusader States were formed, most of them independent of the European powers, though the Byzantine Empire did claim the Crusader states as 'Protectorates'.

By the late 13th century, crusades were no longer of benefit, weakening the Byzantines more than and Saracens. Naval expansion by the Venetians at the expense of the Byzantine empire strained relations.

=== Heavy cavalry and infantry ===
Crusader heavy cavalry initially did not consist of any military orders like the Templars. These were created after the successes of the first crusade. Most of the heavy cavalry were knights. However, these knights would often find themselves unhorsed throughout their mission, due to starvation and lack of fodder for their mounts. Consequently, many heavy cavalry may have found themselves as infantry towards the end of their crusade.

Some military orders may have fought on foot as dismounted knights. This would have been favorable in circumstances were the ground was difficult or else too narrow for large numbers of cavalry. However, in the open desert plains of the Middle East, it would have been foolish to travel on foot.

Templar Knights

The Templar Knights were created in 1119 when King Baldwin II gave permission for eight knights to start a new military order to protect pilgrims on their way to the Holy land. They never retreated from battle and as a result, only a tenth of the Templars survived battle. The Order had to constantly spend large sums of money recruiting new knights. Over time, The Templars grew to an impressive order of thousands of members, though not all would have been heavy cavalry – most would have been squires or servants accompanying the Knights. The Templars participated in almost every major battle of the Second Crusade onwards. They were later betrayed and disbanded by a combination of the French crown and the papacy.

Knights of St. John

The Knights of St. John were founded as a military order in 1113. Their aim was to protect pilgrims and more importantly, to set up hospices and other charitable services to the pilgrims. In 1005, a Christian hospital was destroyed by the Caliph Al Hakim. This was rebuilt later in 1023. The Knights of St. John were forced to evacuate from the Holy Land, traveling across the Mediterranean until finally settling on Malta. They remained a potent force until their dismemberment by Napoleon Bonaparte in 1798.

Knights of Santiago

Although many historians see the Reconquista in Spain itself as a long Crusade, the Knights of Santiago did not take part in any campaigns in the Levant. Their mission, like many of the other military orders, was to protect pilgrims heading from Northern Spain, which in the twelfth century was Christian, into the Islamic south and then to the Holy land.

Teutonic Knights

The Teutonic Knightly order was founded in the late 12th century after the crusades in the Middle East (most likely the Third Crusade). Of German origin, Germany initially contributed a large army of heavy infantry and cavalry under Frederick Barbarossa. After the aging emperor's mysterious death (and supposed pickling), a few of these knights made it to the Holy Land and established themselves, where they controlled the polls of the ports in the parts of the Levant controlled by the Crusaders. Most of the action seen by these Knights, however, were directed against Prussia and the Polish–Lithuanian commonwealth. The Teutonic Knights declined in importance after a crushing defeat by the Polish–Lithuanian forces in the 1410 Battle of Tannenberg. The Teutons were finally dissolved by Napoleon Bonaparte in 1809. However, the descendants of these Knights formed the elite Prussian officers and such the legacy of the order's martial skill can be examined in the Napoleonic and the Franco-Prussian War.

Infantry

Typical medieval military doctrine dictated that infantry would be the main composition of any army, but that cavalry would dominate the battlefield. This was certainly true of the Crusaders. It required great horsemanship and archery skills to be a cavalry archer. Horsemen could conserve their strength for battle but infantry had to march to battle. This daunting task across the desert is made all the more uncomfortable when considering the weight arms, armour, and baggage, combined with the threat of getting lost while surrounded by the enemy. Both sides used their cavalry to strike the deepest blow, while the infantry would then be useful in supporting roles, such as archery, covering flanks, or using sheer weight and numbers in attrition and pursuit.

=== Strategy ===
Despite their small size, the Crusaders were a very effective force. Many leaders who led their own national crusades like Richard the Lionheart, used only the knights under his banner. When it came to composite Crusader armies, there was no choice but to unite, since the surrounding hostile Arab and Turkish forces could easily outnumber the Crusaders. When that was the case with Baibars, the Crusader states fell one by one.

One of the Crusaders' long-term goals was the conquest of Egypt. A rich and fertile province, any cost in its invasion would have been easily paid off from its revenue, even if the spoils were to be shared with the Byzantine Empire.

Crusaders emphasized speed, attempting to make a bold opening move before the enemy could finish theirs. This was done despite the lack of mounts for their knights, and could have good or ill consequences. At Ascalon, the Crusaders were able to launch a rapid assault, leading to a great victory. At Hattin, they quickly fell into a deadly trap and were annihilated for it. The distance covered by an army in a day was small: this crusading haste was only present in battle.

The Crusaders generally speaking however, did not seem to have much of a plan other than divide and rule, or else strike at the chain which has the weakest point, as with Egypt. These strategies were pursued as best as they could do so.

=== Siege warfare ===
The Crusaders were not renowned for their siege warfare. During the first siege of Antioch, the Crusaders managed to take the city initially through treachery. However, siege equipment was used, although a favourite tactic of all Medieval European armies was a simple blockade and then wait for a few months or so for the defenders to run out of water, food, or both. This tactic was ineffective when the crusaders faced larger numbers, such as at Antioch. During the Portuguese Reconquista, a fleet of English, German and French crusaders assisted in the Siege of Lisbon, using their siege towers to successfully assault the city.

However, Crusaders were renowned for their castle building of the strongest fortresses, such as Krak des Chevaliers, were built and ensured their supremacy in a land surrounded by hostiles, until their under-manned walls were taken, as with Acre which, despite possessing a double wall, was under-manned and therefore overwhelmed.
