= Battle of Aintab =

Battle in the Holy Land in 1150

- Part of the Crusades
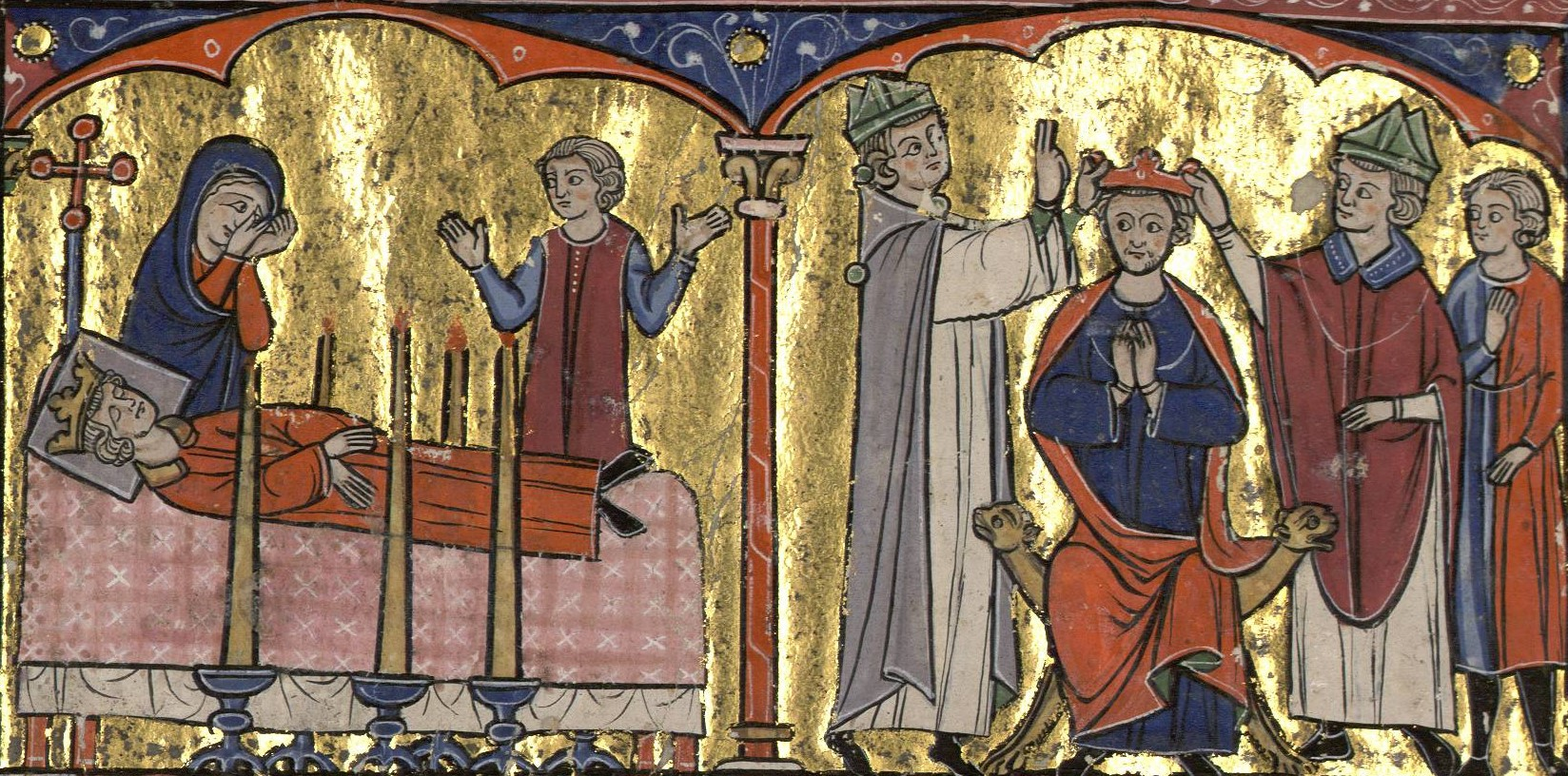
- Manuscript art of depicting Baldwin III
Date	August 1150
Location	Gaziantep (present-day Turkey)
Result	Crusader victory

Belligerents
Kingdom of Jerusalem	Zengid dynasty

Commanders and leaders
Baldwin III of Jerusalem	Nur al-Din Zengi

Strength
500 knights unknown number of infantry	Unknown

Casualties and losses
Unknown	Unknown

In the Battle of Aintab in August 1150, a Crusader force commanded by King Baldwin III of Jerusalem repelled the attacks of Nur al-Din Zengi of Aleppo and evacuated the Latin Christian residents of the County of Edessa. This was both a tactical victory and a strategic defeat for the Crusaders.

== Background ==
Zengi, Nur ad-Din's father, had seized Edessa in 1144. Deprived of their capital, the western lands of the County of Edessa continued a precarious existence for six more years. They came under increasing pressure from the Muslim states surrounding them. In 1150, the Byzantine Emperor Manuel I Komnenos expressed an interest in acquiring the rump of the County of Edessa. As their feudal overlord, Baldwin III was required to defend them in case of attack. Recognizing that the Crusaders were unlikely to hold on to these territories for much longer, Baldwin agreed to turn them over to the Byzantines.

Baldwin met with Manuel's agents at Turbessel (Tell Bashir) to negotiate the transfer of territories. Franks or Armenians who wished to remain under Latin rule were allowed to march back to the Principality of Antioch with the king, taking their possessions with them. Baldwin's small army consisted of 500 mounted knights and an unknown number of foot soldiers.

== Battle ==
Nur ad-Din's forces fell upon the withdrawing Latin column between Dülük and Aintab. By deploying his soldiers in battle order, Baldwin was able to get his non-combatants safely into the town of Aintab, where the Latin force spent the night.

The following day the Franks organized their soldiers to protect the refugees and the baggage train. Baldwin led the advance guard while Antiochene knights protected the right and left flanks. Raymond II of Tripoli and Humphrey II of Toron directed a strong rear guard. The position of the foot soldiers in the formation was not mentioned by the chronicler, William of Tyre.

Nur ad-Din's Turks attacked in the traditional manner, surrounding the column and subjecting it to "arrows in such showers that the appearance of the baggage soon resembled a porcupine." All day long, the Turks tried to break up the Crusader formation or cause a collapse of morale. But the Franks plodded ahead, keeping a strict march discipline and making partial charges when their enemies pressed too close. Nur ad-Din, discouraged by his lack of success and short on supplies, withdrew at sunset. The Crusader column delivered the refugees to Antiochene territories without further trouble.

== Aftermath ==
Baldwin had calculated correctly. Within a year, the remaining territories of the former County of Edessa fell to the Turks. The skirmish had been a tactical success because the Crusaders escaped serious losses and successfully protected the pro-Latin civilians. But the permanent loss of the County of Edessa represented a strategic defeat.
