= Shah-Armens =

Turkoman dynasty (c. 1071–1207)

Shah-Armens Ahlatşahlar
- 1071–1207
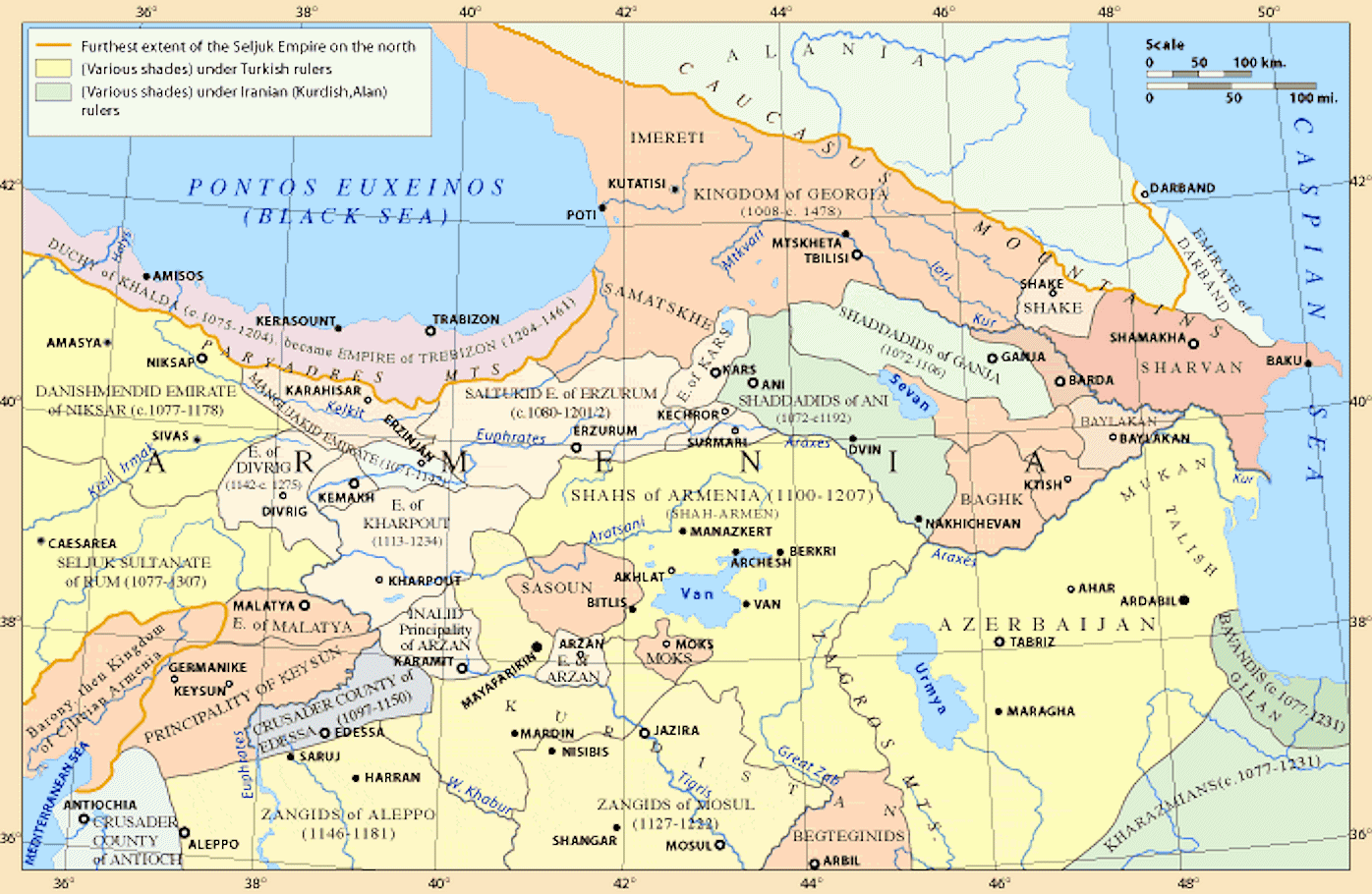
- Map of the Shah-Armens Beylik ( )
- Capital: Ahlat
- Common languages: Turkish, Armenian
- Religion: Sunni Islam
- Government: Monarchy
- History
  - Establishment: 1071
  - Disestablished: 1207
Preceded by	Succeeded by
Seljuk Empire; Marwanids (Diyar Bakr)	Ayyubid dynasty

The Shah-Armens (lit. 'Kings of Armenia', Turkish: Ermenşahlar), also known as Ahlatshahs (lit. 'Rulers of Ahlat', Turkish: Ahlatşahlar) or Begtimurids, was a Armeno—Turkic Sunni Muslim dynasty founded after the Battle of Manzikert (1071) and centred in Ahlat on the northwestern shore of the Lake Van. This region comprised most of modern-day Bitlis and Van, and parts of Muş provinces.

== History ==
The dynasty is sometimes also called Sökmenli in reference to the founder of the principality, Sökmen el-Kutbî, literally "Sökmen the Slave", one of the commanders of the Alp Arslan. The Ahlatshah Sökmenli should not be confused with the Sökmen, which ruled in Hasankeyf during approximately the same period. Another title Sökmen and his descendants assumed, as heirs to the local Armenian princes according to Clifford Edmund Bosworth, was the Persian title Shah-i Arman ("Shah of Armenia"), often rendered as Ermenshahs. This dynastic name, which the rulers adopted, was established through the "ethnic make-up and political history" of the region they ruled, which was primarily Armenian.

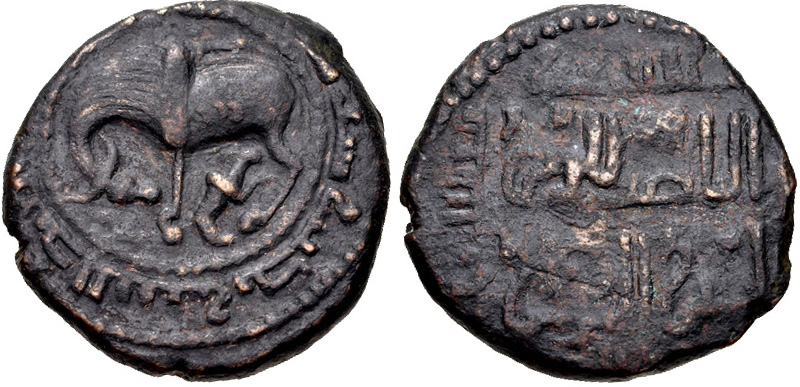
Coinage of Sayf al-Din Begtimur ("Seyfettin Beytemür"). AH 579-589 (AD 1183-1193). Probably Ahlat mint. Dated AH (58)9 (AD 1193).

The Beylik was founded by the Sökmen el-Kutbî who took over Ahlat (Khliat or Khilat) in 1100. Ahlatshahs were closely tied to Great Seljuq institutions, although they also followed independent policies like the wars against Georgia in alliance with their neighbours to the north, the Saltukids. They also acquired links with the branch of the Artuqids based in Meyyafarikin (now Silvan), becoming part of a nexus of principalities in Upper Mesopotamia and Western Armenia.

The Ahlatshahs reached their brightest period under the fifty-seven-year reign of Sökmen II (1128–1185). He was married to a female relative (daughter or sister) of the Saltukid ruler Saltuk II. Since Sökmen II was childless, the beylik was seized by a series of slave commanders after his death. In 1207, the beylik was taken over by the Ayyubids, who had long coveted Ahlat. The Ayyubids had come to the city at the invitation of people of Ahlat after the last Sökmenli ruler was killed by Tuğrulshah, the ruler (melik) of Erzurum on behalf of the Sultanate of Rum and brother of Sultan Kayqubad I.

The Ahlatshahs left a large number of historic tombstones in and around the city of Ahlat. Local administrators are currently trying to have the tombstones included in UNESCO's World Heritage List, where they are currently listed tentatively.

== Gallery ==
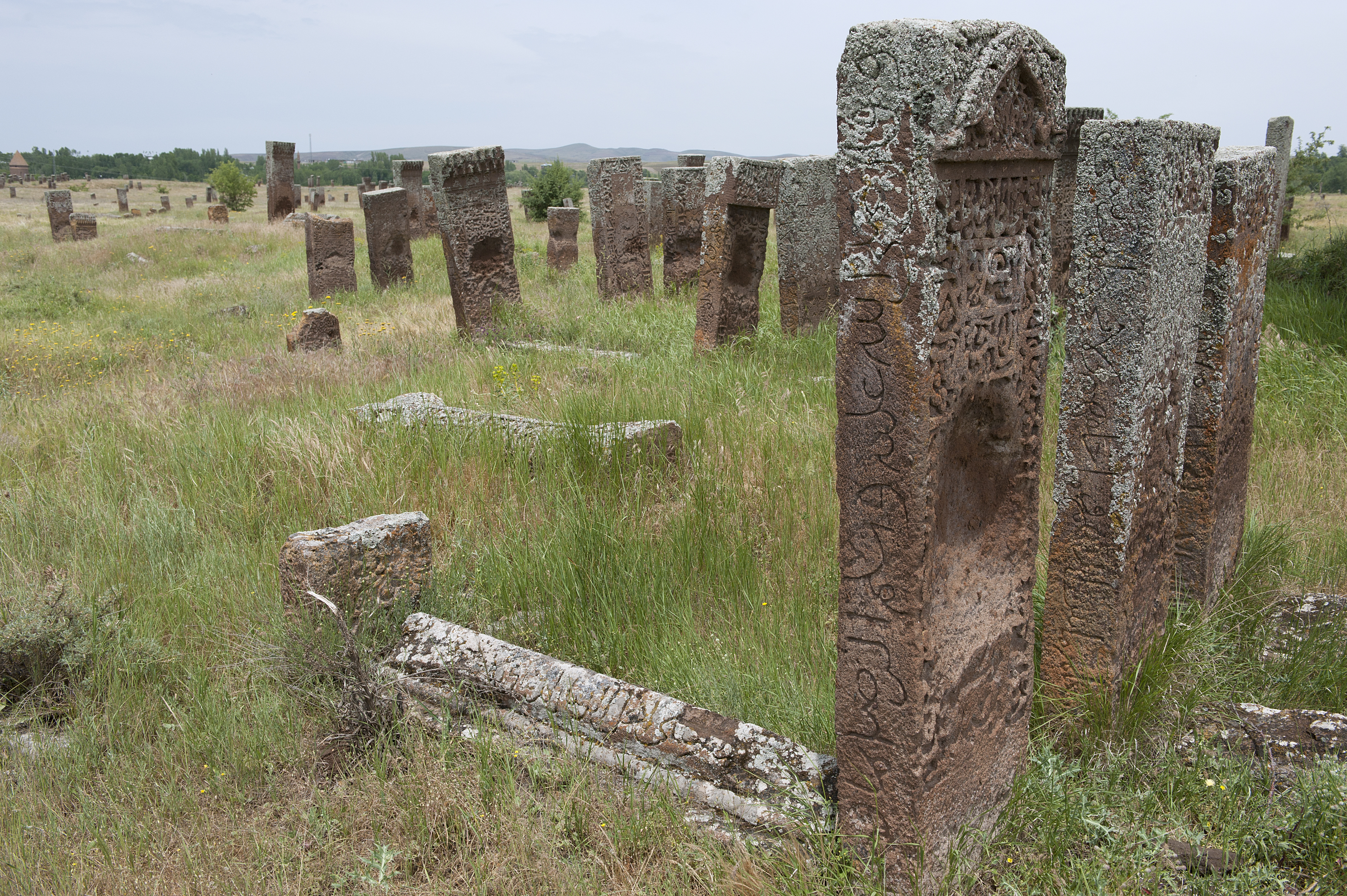
Ahlat Gravestones

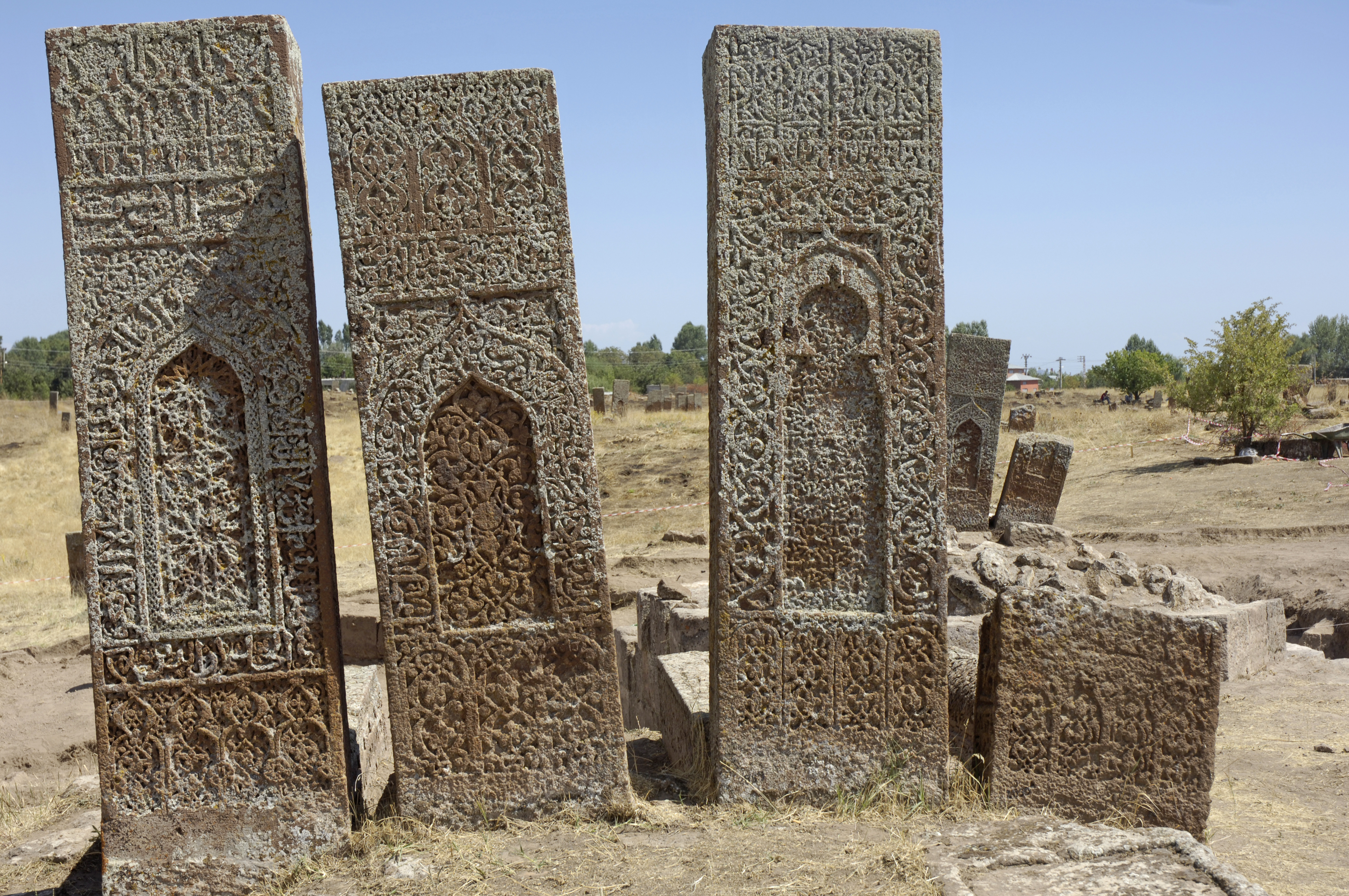
Ahlat Gravestones

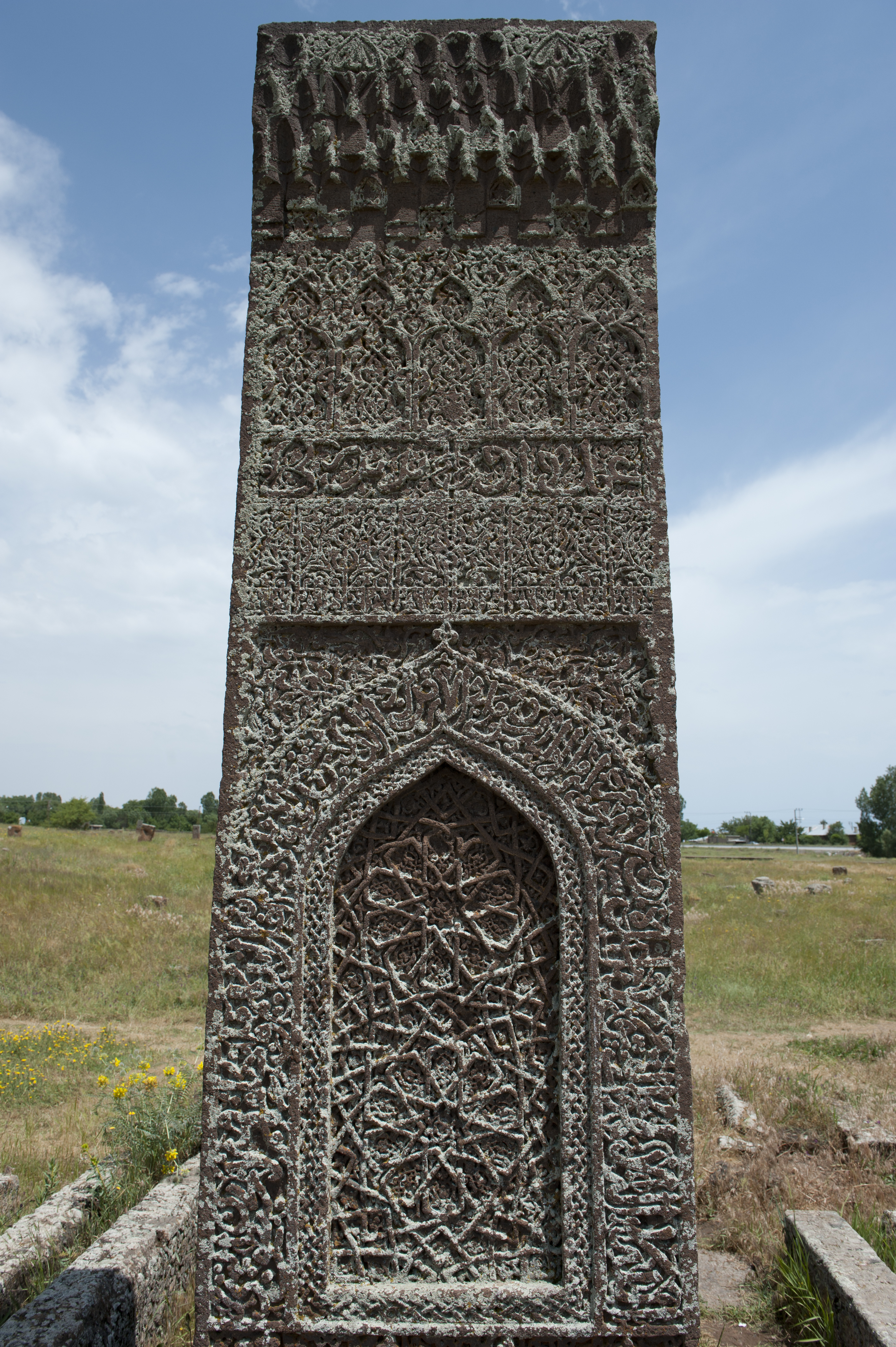
Ahlat Gravestone

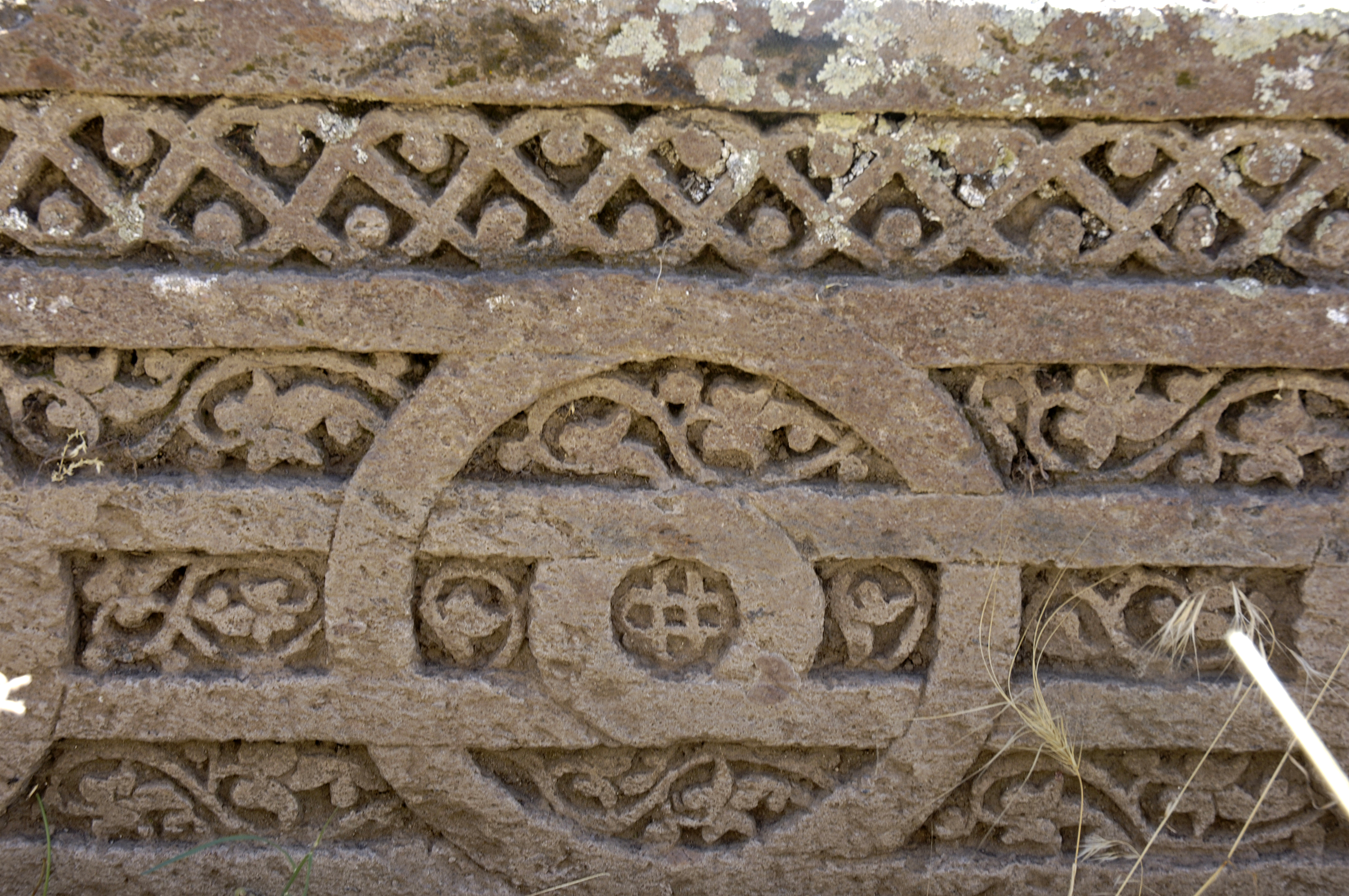
Ahlat gravestone Detail

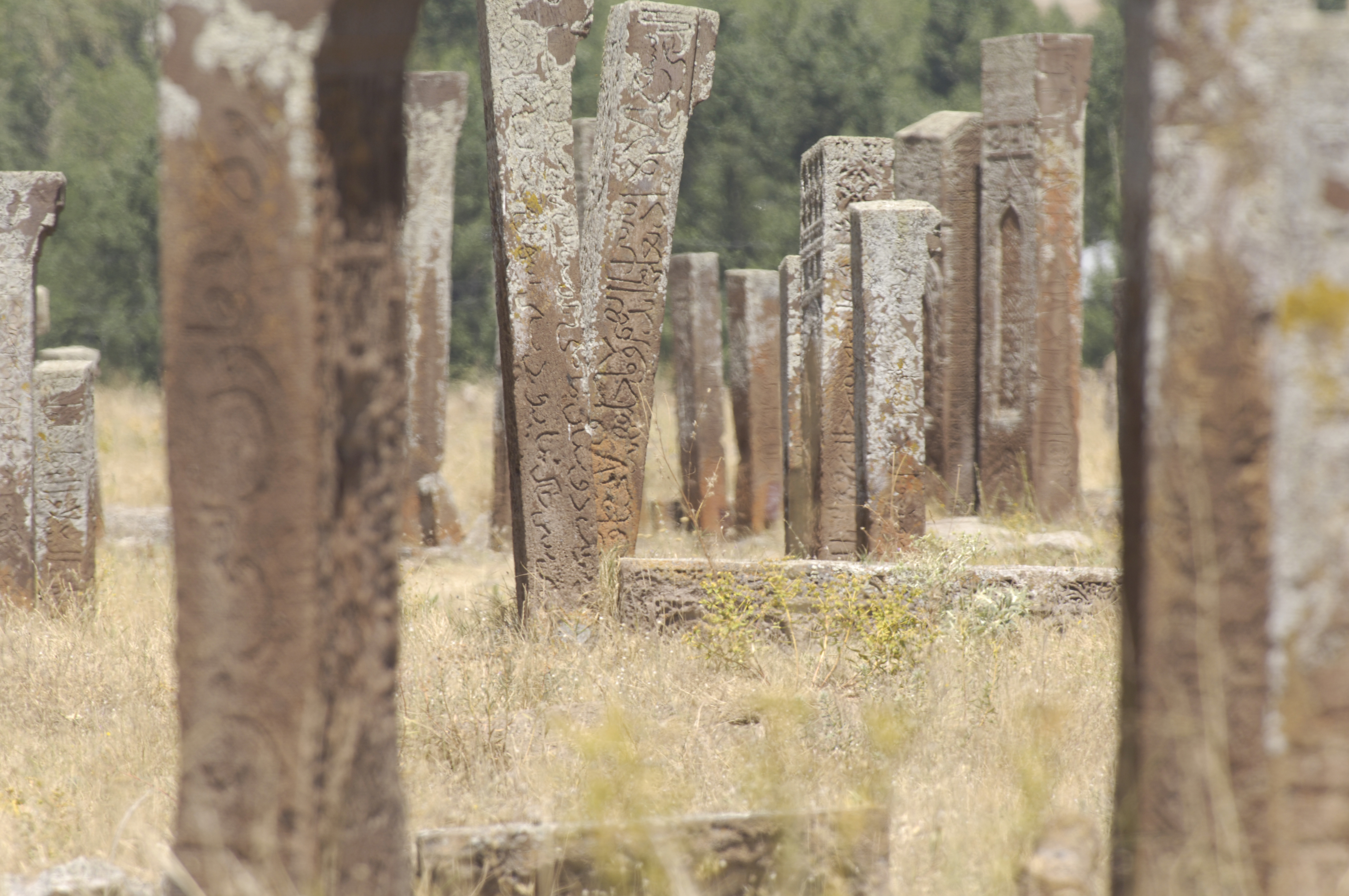
Ahlat Gravestone

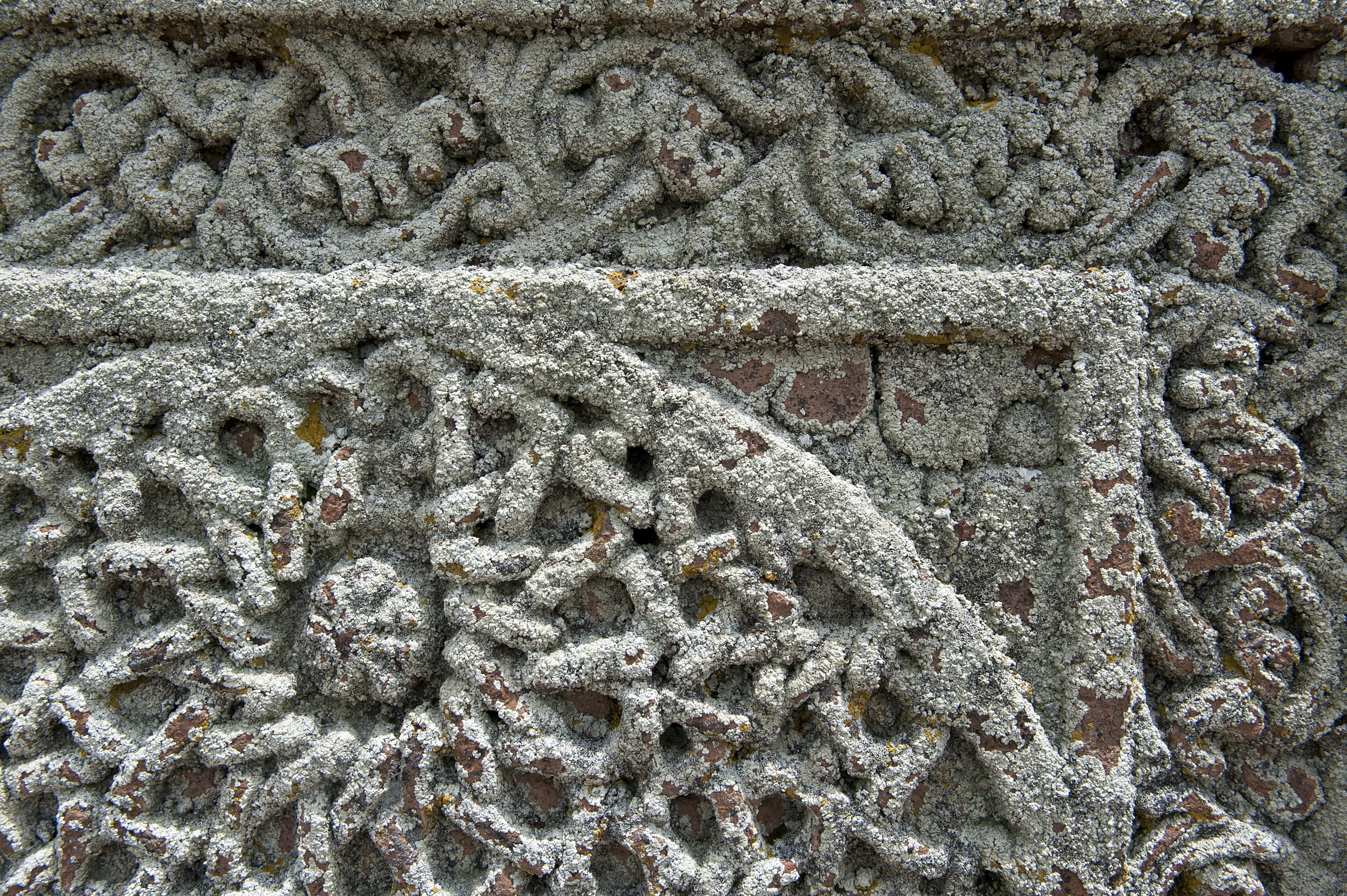
Ahlat Gravestone

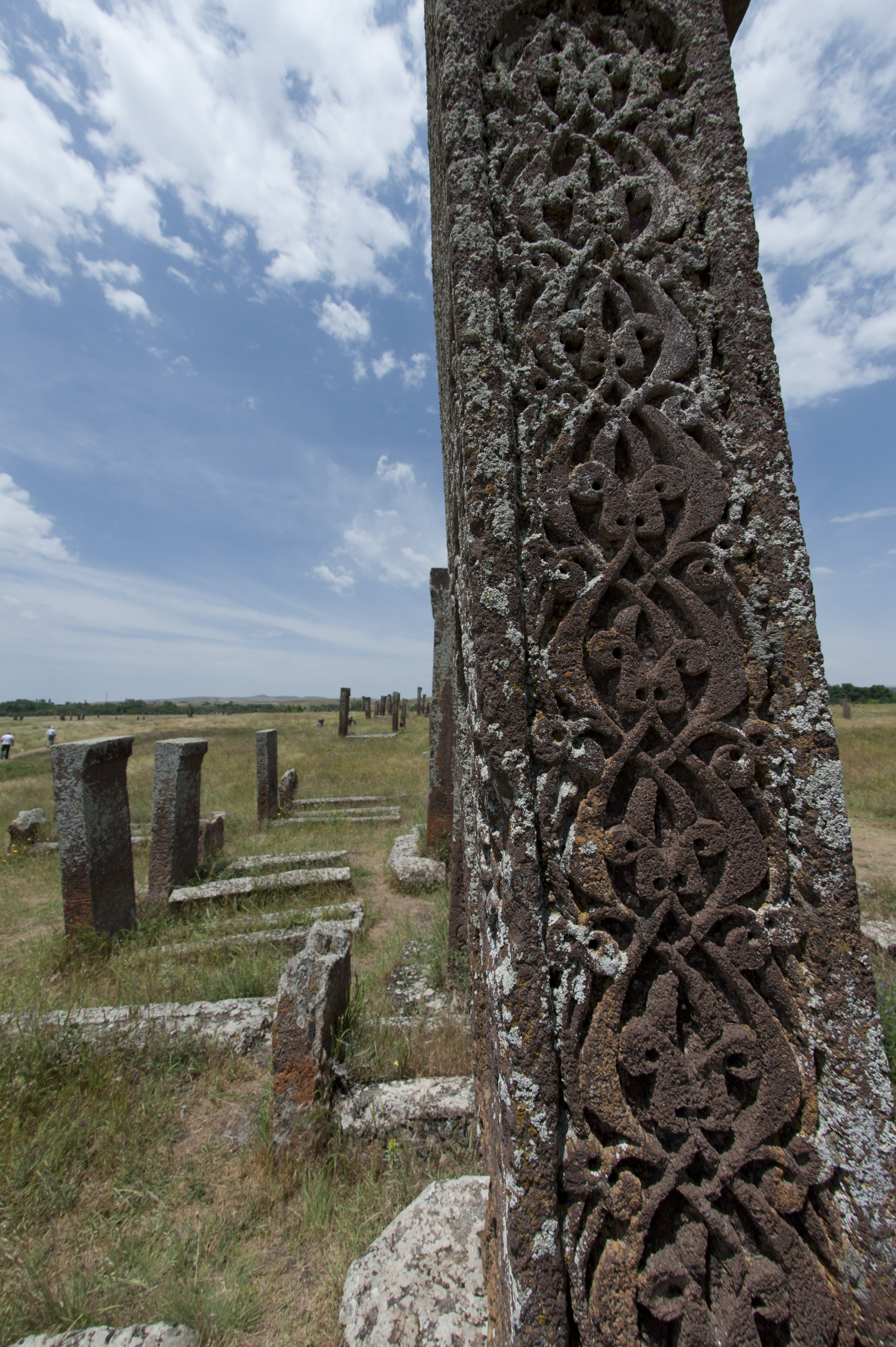
Ahlat Gravestone

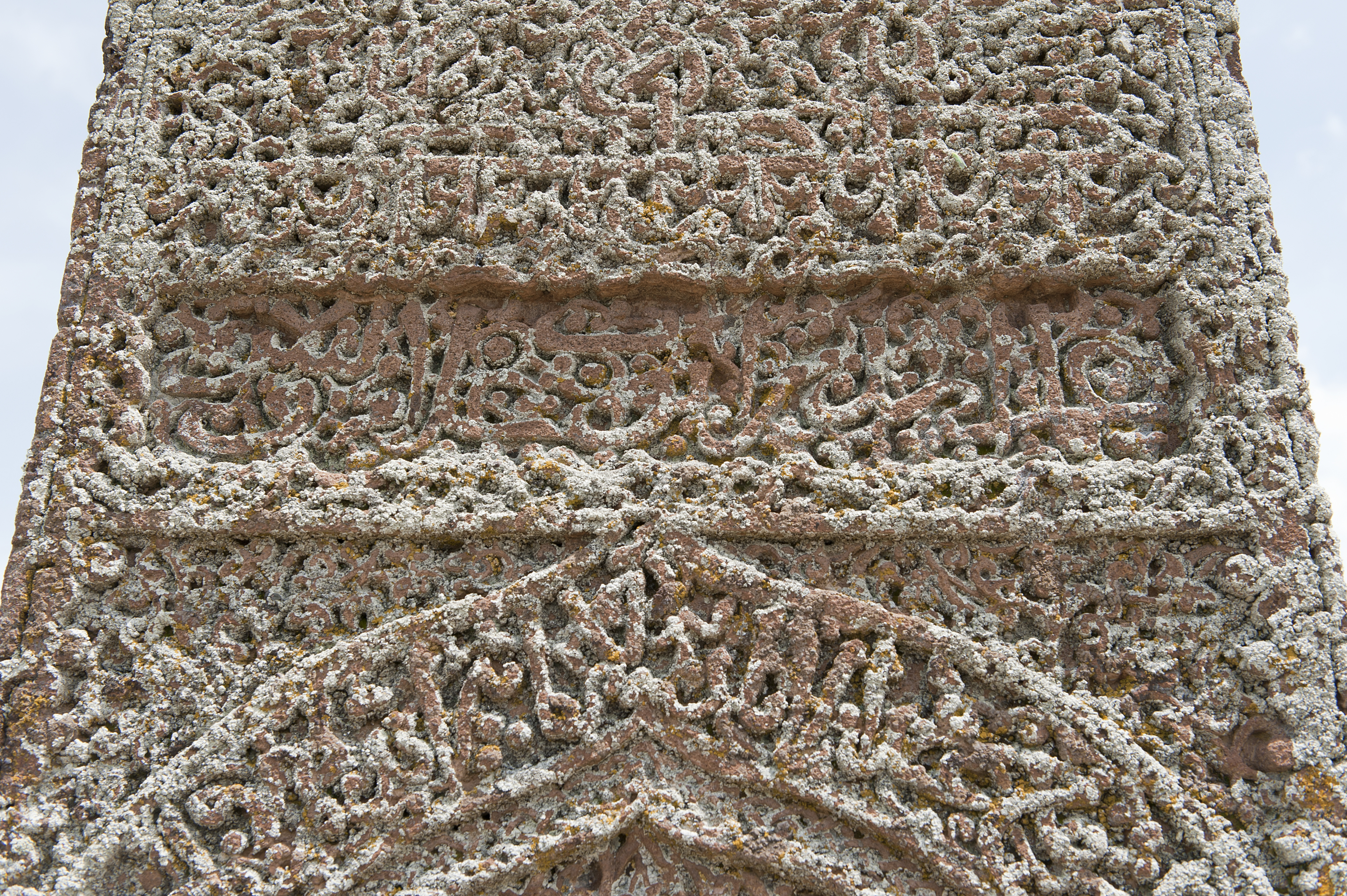
Ahlat Gravestone

== List of Shah-Armens ==
Reign	Name	Son of	Note
1100–1111	Sökmen I		
1111–1127	Zahireddin İbrahim	Sökmen	
1127–1128	Ahmet	Sökmen	
1128–1185	Nasireddin Muhammed Sökmen II	Ibrahim	Died without heirs.
1185–1193	Seyfettin Beytemür		The beys from then on were Ghilmans.
1193–1198	Bedreddin Aksungur		
1198	Şücaüddin Kutluğ		
1198–1206	Melikülmansur Muhammed	Beytemür	
1206–1207	Izzeddin Balaban		

== Genealogy of House of Shah-Armen ==
House of Shah-Armen

Shah-Armenid Beylik

Suqman I r. 1100–1111
Ibrahim r. 1111–1127	Ahmad r. 1127–1128
Suqman II r. 1128–1185
Beg-Timur r. 1185–1193	Aqsunghur r. 1193–1198	Qutluq r. 1198–1198	Balban r. 1207–1208
Muhammad r. 1198–1207

== See also ==
- List of Sunni Muslim dynasties

== Sources ==
- Claude Cahen, Pre-Ottoman Turkey
- Pancaroğlu, Oya (2013). "The House of Mengüjek in Divriği: Constructions of Dynastic Identity in the Late Twelfth Century". In Peacock, A.C.S.; Yildiz, Sara Nur (eds.). The Seljuks of Anatolia: Court and Society in the Medieval Middle East. I.B.Tauris. ISBN 978-1848858879.
