= Raphanea =

Ancient city in Syria Secunda

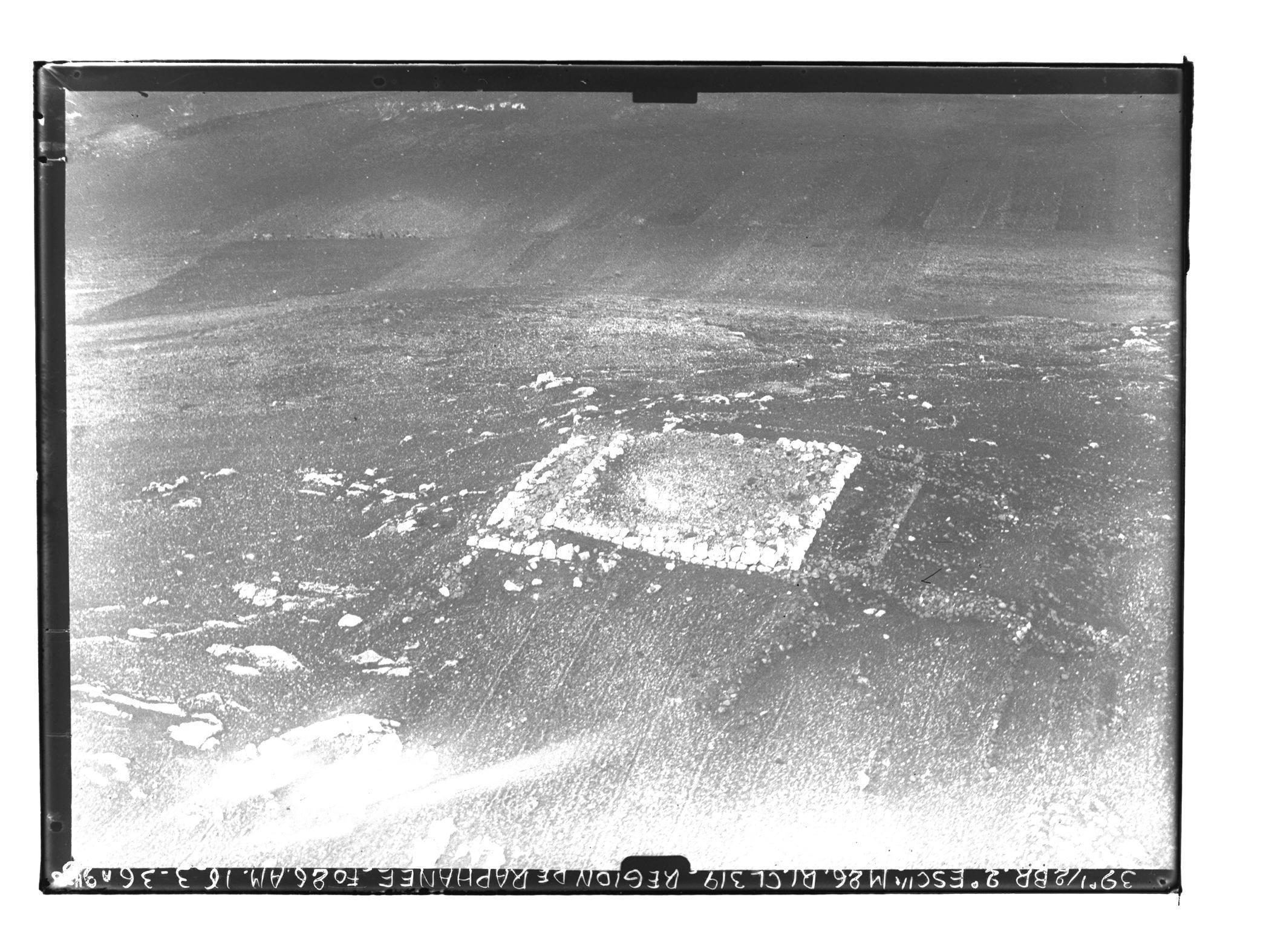
- 1936 aerial view of Raphanea

- Location within Syria
- 34°56′03″N 36°23′48″E
- Location: Syria
- Region: Hama Governorate

Raphanea or Raphaneae (Ancient Greek: Ῥαφάνεια; Arabic: الرفنية, romanized: al-Rafaniyya; colloquial: Rafniye) was a city of the late Roman province of Syria Secunda. Its bishopric was a suffragan of Apamea.

== History ==
Josephus mentions Raphanea in connection with a river Σαββατικον, referred now to as Sambation that flowed only every seventh days (probably an intermittent spring now called Fuwar ed-Deir) and that was viewed by Titus on his way northward from Berytus after the destruction of Jerusalem in AD 70.

Near Emesa, Raphanea was the fortified headquarters of the Legio III Gallica from which was launched the successful bid of 14-year-old Elagabalus to become Roman Emperor in 218.

Raphanea issued coins under Elagabalus, and many of its coins are extant.

Hierocles and Georgius Cyprius mention Raphanea among the towns of Syria Secunda. The crusaders passed through it at the end of 1099; it was taken by Baldwin I and was given to the Count of Tripoli. It was then known as Rafania.

== Episcopal see ==
The only bishops of Raphanea known are:

- Bassianus, present at the Nicaea, 325;
- Gerontius at Philippopolis, 344;
- Basil at Constantinople, 381;
- Lampadius at Chalcedon, 451;
- Zoilus about 518;
- Nonnus, 536.

The see is mentioned as late as the 10th century in the Notitia episcopatuum of Antioch.
