= Sökmen el-Kutbî =

Founder of the Shah-Armens (r. 1110–1111)

Sökmen

Governor of Ahlat
- In office 1100–1110

Bey of Ahlatshahs
- In office 1110–1111
- Succeeded by: İbrahim of Ahlatshahs

Personal details
- Born: Unknown
- Died: 1111 Til Başer

Military service
- Allegiance: Seljuq Empire
- Battles/wars: Conquest of Ahlat; Conquest of Silvan

Sökmen el-Kutbî (also spelled al-Qutbi) was a Turkmen military commander, a former slave amir in the service of the Seljuks, who became the founder of the Shah-i Arman dynasty, also known as the Shah-Armens or Ahlatshahs.

== Early life ==
He was a subordinate and ghilman (slave commander) of Seljukid prince Kutbüddin İsmâil İlarslan (a cousin of Malik-Shah I). After his superior was killed in a battle, upon the request of the citizens, he moved to Ahlat (now a district center in Bitlis Province of Turkey, then an important Islamic cultural center) where he fought against Marwanids and captured the city on behalf of the Great Seljuk Empire in 1100.

== Beylik ==
Sökmen captured the nearby settlements to the north and west of the Lake Van and increased his power of influence. His most successful conquest is the conquest of Silvan (now a district center in Diyarbakır Province of Turkey, then known as Mayyafaraqin). In 1109 he suffered a defeat by the Armenian local ruler Kogh Vasil who held territory around Raban and Kaysun. Sökmen was always loyal to the Seljukid sultan Mohammad I Tapar and participated in the campaigns of the sultan. Mohammad in turn granted Ahlat to Sökmen as an ikta in 1110. Thus this date is now considered to be the date of the establishment of Ahlatshahs Beylik. In some documents the name of the beylik is "Sökmenli" referring to Sökmen.

== Death ==
In 1111, he was invited to participate in a Seljukid campaign. With his troops he joined the main Seljukid army. But during the siege of Turbessel (a castle near Gaziantep) he died in August 1111. His coffin was sent to Ahlat.

== Sources ==
- Dadoyan, Seta B. (1 November 2012). The Armenians in the Medieval Islamic World: Armenian Realpolitik in the Islamic World and Diverging Paradigmscase of Cilicia Eleventh to Fourteenth C. Transaction Publishers. ISBN 978-1-4128-4782-7.
- Pancaroğlu, Oya (2013). "The House of Mengüjek in Divriği: Constructions of Dynastic Identity in the Late Twelfth Century". In Peacock, A.C.S.; Yildiz, Sara Nur (eds.). The Seljuks of Anatolia: Court and Society in the Medieval Middle East. I.B.Tauris. ISBN 978-1848858879.
