= Al-Mustazhir =

Abbasid Caliph in Baghdad (r. 1094–1118)

Al-Mustazhir المستظهر
- Khalīfah; Amir al-Mu'minin

28th Caliph of the Abbasid Caliphate Abbasid Caliph in Baghdad
- Reign: 3 February 1094 – 6 August 1118
- Predecessor: Al-Muqtadi
- Successor: Al-Mustarshid
- Born: April/May 1078; Baghdad, Abbasid Caliphate
- Died: 6 August 1118 (aged 40); Baghdad, Abbasid Caliphate
- Burial: Baghdad
- Consort: Ismah Khatun; Lubanah; Ashin; Nzhh; Aqblan; Razin
- Issue: Al-Mustarshid; Al-Muqtafi; Abu Ishaq Ibrahim; Abu'l-Hasan Ali
- Dynasty: Abbasid
- Father: Al-Muqtadi
- Mother: Tayf al-Khayal
- Religion: Sunni Islam

Abu'l-Abbas Ahmad ibn Abdallah al-Muqtadi (Arabic: أبو العباس أحمد بن عبد الله المقتدي) usually known simply by his regnal name Al-Mustazhir billah (Arabic: المستظهر بالله) (b. April/May 1078 – 6 August 1118 d.) was the Abbasid Caliph in Baghdad from 1094 to 1118. He succeeded his father al-Muqtadi as the Caliph. The main and important events during his reign are; appearance of the First Crusade in Western Syria, Muslim protest in Baghdad against crusaders, his efforts to help Mawdud to organize several expeditions to reconquer lands from the Crusaders.

== Biography ==
Al-Mustazhir's father was caliph Al-Muqtadi. His mother was Tayf al-Khayal, a Turkish concubine. He was born in 1078 (the 5th Islamic century). Al-Mustazhir's full name was Ahmad ibn Abdallah al-Muqtadi and his kunya was Abu'l-Abbas.

When his father died on 3 February 1094 at the age of 37 – 38. Al-Mustazhir succeeded him. At the time of accession to the throne, he was just sixteen years old. Just a months after is accession to the Caliphal throne al-Mustazhir became angry with his paternal grand aunt, In 1094, the new Caliph compelled his grand aunt, Sayyida bint Abdallah al-Qa'im to remain in her house lest she should intrigue for his overthrow. She died on 20 October 1102 during his reign.

Amid ad-Dawla would remain Abbasid vizier until 1099 or 1100, when he was removed from office and imprisoned by the Seljuk sultan Berkyaruq. There are different accounts for Amid ad-Dawla's downfall – in one, Mu'ayyad al-Mulk, who had succeeded his father Nizam al-Mulk as Seljuk vizier, had offered the Abbasid vizierate to al-A'azz, and the two collaborated to remove him from office without input from Barkyaruq. In another, Barkyaruq himself fired Amid ad-Dawla and fined him "an enormous sum" for misappropriating government funds before imprisoning him. In any case, Amid ad-Dawla died in prison shortly after, in 1100.

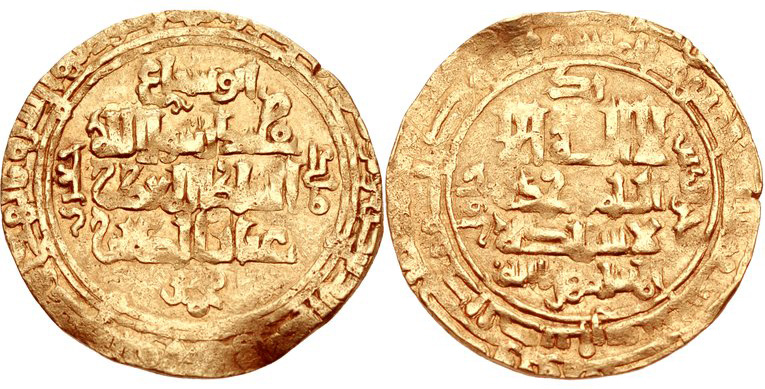
Gold Dinar minted with Caliph Al-Mustazhir and Muhammad I Tapar name with the Kalima (492-511 AH/1105-1118 AD). (Citing Al-Mustazhir as the overlord over Seljuk Sultanate)

After Amid ad-Dawla's downfall, his brother al-Kafi served as vizier to the Abbasid caliph al-Mustazhir from 1102/3 until 1106/7 and then again from 1108/9 until 1113/4.

During Al-Mustazhir's twenty-four year incumbency he was politically irrelevant, despite the civil strife at home and the appearance of the First Crusade in Syria. An attempt was even made by crusader Raymond IV of Toulouse to attack Baghdad, but he was defeated near Mersivan during the Crusade of 1101. The global Muslim population had climbed to about 5 per cent as against the Christian population of 11 per cent by 1100.

=== Muslim protests against Franks in Baghdad and Aftermath ===
The crusaders (Franks) had captured Jerusalem in mid-1099 (492 AH) and its inhabitants were massacred, also invaded parts of western Syria. The qadi of Aleppo, Ibn al-Khashshab was one of the first to preach jihad against the Crusaders, a concept which became more popular throughout the 12th century. His preaching was popular among the masses, but Ridwan, along with his Assassin advisors, were not willing to wage battle against the newly formed Crusader states. Aleppo was continually threatened by the Crusaders and eventually Ridwan was humiliated by Tancred of Antioch, forced to place crosses on the minarets of some of the mosques in the city including the Great Mosque of Aleppo.

Ibn al-Khashshab had sought help from the Abbasid caliph al-Mustazhir, but each time his requests were ignored; finally, in 1111, he travelled to Baghdad to seek help from the caliph in person. He instigated a riot and destroyed the pulpit of the minbar in the private mosques of the Seljuk sultan Muhammad I Tapar and the Abbasid caliph. In response, the caliph al-Mustazhir requested the sultan to ordered Mawdud, the ruler of Mosul, to come to Aleppo's aid, and Ibn al-Khashshab returned home. However, Ridwan did not want Mawdud interfering in his affairs, and had Ibn al-Khashshab imprisoned; Mawdud and Ridwan were unable to cooperate and Mawdud returned to Mosul. When Ridwan died in 1113, Ibn al-Khashshab governed the city in place of weak or child emirs. He helped rid the city of the Assassins, including their leader Abu Tahir al-Sa'igh, by expulsion or execution. When the Crusaders threatened the city of Aleppo again in 1119, Ibn al-Khashshab negotiated an alliance with Ilghazi of the Artuqid dynasty in northern Mesopotamia, and the Principality of Antioch was defeated at the Battle of Ager Sanguinis that year. Ibn al-Khashshab personally led Aleppan troops in the battle. The crusaders besieged Aleppo in 1124, and when they desecrated the Mashhad al-Muhassin (Note: Also referred to as Mashhad al-Dikka.) outside the city, Ibn al-Khashshab ordered that four of the six Christian churches in the city, including the sixth-century Syrian cathedral, be converted into mosques. The besiegers, led by Baldwin II of Jerusalem and Joscelin I of Edessa, were allied with the Muslim Dubays ibn Sadaqa of the Banu Mazyad, whom Ibn al-Khashshab publicly denounced. The siege was eventually raised with help from Aqsunqur al-Bursuqi, ruler of Mosul, in 1125.

== Family ==
One of Al-Mustazhir's wives was Ismah Khatun. She was the daughter of Seljuk Sultan Malik-Shah I. Al-Mustazhir married her in Isfahan in 1108–9. She later came to Baghdad and took up residence in the Caliphal Palace. On 3 February 1112, she gave birth to Abu Ishaq Ibrahim, who died of smallpox in October 1114, and was buried in the mausoleum of al-Muqtadir in Rusafah Cemetery, beside his uncle Ja'far, son of the caliph al-Muqtadi. Upon the death of Al-Mustazhir, Ismah returned to Isfahan, where she died, and was buried within the law college that she had founded there on Barracks Market Street. She died in 1141–42. One of his concubines was Lubanah. She was from Baghdad, and was the mother of the future Caliph Al-Mustarshid. She died in 1133–34. Another concubine was Ashin. She was from Syria, and was the mother of the future Caliph Al-Muqtafi. Some other concubines were Nzhh, an Ethiopian, Aqblan, a Turkish and Razin. Another son was Amir Abu'l-Hasan Ali. He died in June 1131.

== Succession ==
Al-Mustazhir died in the year 1118 at the age of 40. He was succeeded by his son Al-Mustarshid as the 29th Abbasid Caliph.

== See also ==
- Al-Ghazali, a prominent and influential philosopher, theologian, jurist of Sunni Islam.
- Ibn Tahir of Caesarea, a historian and traditionist.

== Sources ==
- Lambton, A.K.S. (1988). Continuity and Change in Medieval Persia. Bibliotheca Persica. Bibliotheca Persica. ISBN 978-0-88706-133-2.§
- Raby, Julian (2004). "Nur Al-Din, the Qastal al-Shu'aybiyya, and the "Classical Revival"". Muqarnas:Essays in Honor of J.M. Rogers. 21. Brill.
- Daftary, Farhad (2007). The Isma'ilis: Their History and Doctrines. Cambridge University Press.
- Tabbaa, Yasser (1997). Constructions of Power and Piety in Medieval Aleppo. The Pennsylvania State University Press.
- This text is adapted from William Muir's public domain, The Caliphate: Its Rise, Decline, and Fall.
- الدكتور, عبد القادر بوباية ،الأستاذ (2009). الاكتفاء في اخبار الخلفاء 1-2 ج2. الاكتفاء في اخبار الخلفاء 12. Dar Al Kotob Al Ilmiyah دار الكتب العلمية. p. 485

Al-Mustazhir Abbasid dynasty Born: 1078 Died: 6 August 1118
Sunni Islam titles
| Preceded by Al-Muqtadi | Caliph of Islam; Abbasid Caliph; February 1094 – 6 August 1118 | Succeeded by Al-Mustarshid |
