= Ibn al-Khashshab =

12th-century Shia Muslim Scholar and Qadi in Aleppo (died 1125)

Qadi Ibn al-Khashshab ابن الخشّاب

Personal life
- Born: Abu'l-Faḍl (Abu'l-Hasan) ibn al-Khashshab; Unknown date Aleppo, Syria
- Died: c. 1125 Aleppo, Syria
- Era: Fifth Islamic century
- Region: Aleppo
- Main interest(s): Islamic theology, Islamic jurisprudence
- Relations: Banu al-Khashshab (family)

Religious life
- Religion: Islam
- Creed: Twelver Shia

Abu'l-Faḍl (Abu'l-Hasan) (Note: Ibn Shaddad called him “Abu'l-Hasan”, while Ibn al-Adim named him as “Abu'l-Faḍl”. His son, Yahia ibn Muhammad ibn al-Khashshab, was also known as “Abu'l-Faḍl” or “Abu'l-Hasan”.) ibn al-Khashshab (Note: Another Ibn al-Khashshab was the leader of the Shi'is in Aleppo during the time of Saladin. He wrote a four-volume annotated commentary of Al-Muqtassid, a grammar manual by Ibn Hubayrah, and commented on the Sermon of the roar of a camel. He was executed by As-Salih Ismail al-Malik in 1172.) (Arabic: أبوالفضل (أبوالحسن) بن الخشاب; died 1125) was the Twelver Shia Muslim qadi and rais of Aleppo during the rule of the Seljuk emir Ridwan.

== Life and Career ==
His family, the Banu'l-Khashshab, were wealthy wood-merchants in the city. Upon the arrival of the First Crusade, Ibn al-Khashshab was one of the first to preach jihad against the Crusaders, a concept which became more popular throughout the 12th century. His preaching was popular among the masses, but Ridwan, along with his Assassin advisors, were not willing to wage battle against the newly formed Crusader states. Aleppo was continually threatened by the Crusaders and eventually Ridwan was humiliated by Tancred of Antioch, forced to place crosses on the minarets of some of the mosques in the city including the Great Mosque of Aleppo.

Ibn al-Khashshab had sought help from the Abbasid caliph in Baghdad, al-Mustazhir, but each time his requests were ignored; finally, in 1111, he travelled to Baghdad to seek help from the caliph in person. He instigated a riot and destroyed the pulpit of the minbar in the private mosques of the Seljuk sultan Muhammad I Tapar and the Abbasid caliph. In response, the sultan ordered Mawdud, the atabeg of Mosul, to come to Aleppo's aid, and Ibn al-Khashshab returned home. However, Ridwan did not want Mawdud interfering in his affairs, and had Ibn al-Khashshab imprisoned; Mawdud and Ridwan were unable to cooperate and Mawdud returned to Mosul.

When Ridwan died in 1113, Ibn al-Khashshab governed the city in place of weak or child emirs. He helped rid the city of the Assassins, including their leader Abu Tahir al-Sa'igh, by expulsion or execution. When the Crusaders threatened the city of Aleppo again in 1119, Ibn al-Khashshab negotiated an alliance with Ilghazi of the Artuqid dynasty in northern Mesopotamia, and the Principality of Antioch was defeated at the Battle of Ager Sanguinis that year. Ibn al-Khashshab personally led Aleppan troops in the battle.

The crusaders besieged Aleppo in 1124, and when they desecrated the Mashhad al-Muhassin (Note: Also referred to as Mashhad al-Dikka.) outside the city, Ibn al-Khashshab ordered that four of the six Christian churches in the city, including the sixth-century Syrian cathedral, be converted into mosques. The besiegers, led by Baldwin II of Jerusalem and Joscelin I of Edessa, were allied with the Muslim Dubays ibn Sadaqa of the Banu Mazyad, whom Ibn al-Khashshab publicly denounced. The siege was eventually raised with help from Aqsunqur al-Bursuqi, atabeg of Mosul, in 1125. Later that year, following massacres of Nizaris by Ibn al-Khashshab, he was murdered by Assassins. The next year Aleppo fell under the control of Zengi, who began to implement the jihad that ibn al-Khashshab had so fervently preached and Zengi not only repelled the attempts by the Crusaders to capture Aleppo but he went on the offensive against the Crusaders.

== Sources ==
- Raby, Julian (2004). "Nur Al-Din, the Qastal al-Shu'aybiyya, and the "Classical Revival"". Muqarnas:Essays in Honor of J.M. Rogers. 21. Brill.
- Daftary, Farhad (2007). The Isma'ilis: Their History and Doctrines. Cambridge University Press.
- Tabbaa, Yasser (1997). Constructions of Power and Piety in Medieval Aleppo. The Pennsylvania State University Press.
- Carole Hillenbrand, The Crusades, Islamic Perspectives. New York, 2000.
- P.M. Holt, The Age of the Crusades: The Near East from the Eleventh Century to 1517. New York, 1986.
- Amin Maalouf, The Crusades Through Arab Eyes. 1983
