= Aqsunqur al-Bursuqi =

Turkish leader of Mosul (1113–1114, 1124–1126)

Qasīm al-Dawla Sayf al-Dīn Abū Saʿīd Āqsunqur al-Bursuqī (قسیم الدوله سیف الدین ابو سعید آقسنقر البرسقی), also known as Aqsunqur al-Bursuqi, Aqsonqor il-Bursuqi, Aksunkur al-Bursuki, Aksungur or al-Borsoki, was the Seljuk Turkoman atabeg of Mosul from 1113–1114 and again from 1124–1126.

== Accession ==
He was a Turkoman mamluk of the Bursuqid dynasty founded by Bursuq.

A Turkish officer in the Seljuk army, al-Bursuqi was appointed as the representative of Mawdud, the atabeg of Mosul, to the court of the Seljuk sultan Muhammad I Tapar. An unidentified Assassin murdered Mawdud at a mosque in Damascus on 2 October 1113, and shortly thereafter the sultan appointed al-Bursuqi as Mawdud's successor at Mosul. The sultan also ordered his emirs to continue jihad (or holy war) against the Crusaders. Al-Bursuqi launched a devastating campaign against the County of Edessa in April and May 1115. As the Artuqid ruler of Mardin, Ilghazi, had declined to participate in the campaign, al-Bursuqi invaded his territory, but Ilghazi defeated his troops. Because of the failure of his campaign, al-Bursuqi stayed in al-Rahba, and Juyûsh-beg was appointed atabeg of Mosul by the sultan.

In 1120, Aqsunqur al-Bursuqi was Commander-in-Chief of the armies of the Seljuk ruler of Iraq Mahmud II, and defeated the armies of Mas'ud who was challenging the rule of his brother Mammud II. Aqsunqur al-Bursuqi was then named Shihna (Military Governor) of Iraq, with his base in Baghdad. He was defeated in 1122 by the Arab Banu Mazyad emir Dubays ibn Sadaqa when he marched on Baghdad. Dubays was ultimately defeated with the help of Zengi, and Aqsunqur al-Bursuqi retained the position of Shihna of Iraq until 1124-1125, when he was replaced by Baran-Qush Zakawi.

== Muslim leader ==
Al-Bursuqi was reappointed as atabeg of Mosul in 1124 due to insubordination of Juyûsh-beg. Baldwin II of Jerusalem, Joscelin I of Edessa and a Bedouin leader, Dubays ibn Sadaqa laid siege to Aleppo in October 1124. The qadi of Aleppo, Ibn al-Khashshab, approached al-Bursuqi, seeking his assistance. In 1125, he reclaimed Aleppo for the Seljuk sultan Mahmud II. Al-Bursuqi invaded the Principality of Antioch and forced the allied enemy forces to abandon the siege in January 1125. He also supported Toghtekin in the battle of Azaz in 1125, but a Crusader force relieved it. Using the spoils he gained his victory at Azaz, Baldwin II was able to ransom his daughter Ioveta and Joscelin II of Edessa, then held at Aleppo by al-Bursuqi, that had been used to secure Baldwin's own release.

On November 26, 1126, al-Bursuqi was assassinated by a team of 10 Nizari Assassins attacking him with knives while he was at the Great Mosque of Mosul. He wounded three of his assassins before his death. The murderers were captured and executed. The attack was presumably ordered by Mahmud II.

His son Mas’ûd ibn Bursuqî replaced him in Mosul, but his reign was short-lived because of the rise of the Zengid dynasty.

== Sources ==
- Asbridge, Thomas (2000). The Creation of the Principality of Antioch, 1098–1130. The Boydell Press. ISBN 978-0-85115-661-3.
- Barber, Malcolm (2012). The Crusader States. Yale University Press. ISBN 978-0-300-11312-9.
- Maalouf, Amin (1984). The Crusades Through Arab Eyes. SAQI. ISBN 978-0-86356-023-1.
- Murray, Alan V. (2000). The Crusader Kingdom of Jerusalem: A Dynastic History, 1099–1125. Prosopographica et Geneologica. ISBN 978-1-9009-3403-9.
