= Siege of Aleppo (1124–1125) =

Crusaders siege on Aleppo in 1124-1125

Battle of Aleppo
- Part of the Crusades
Date	6 October 1124 – 25 January 1125
Location	Aleppo, Syria
Result	Artuqid-Bursuqid Victory

Belligerents
Kingdom of Jerusalem; County of Edessa; Banu Mazyad; Seljuk Sultanate of Aleppo	Artukids; Supported by: Bursuqid dynasty

Commanders and leaders
Baldwin II; Joscelin I Dubays ibn Sadaqa; Sultan Shah	Ibn al-Khashshab; Supported by: Aqsunqur al-Bursuqi

The siege of Aleppo by Baldwin II of Jerusalem and his allies lasted from 6 October 1124 to 25 January 1125. It ended in a Crusader withdrawal following the arrival of a relief force led by Aqsunqur al-Bursuqi.

== Background ==
Located in the Syrian steppes, Aleppo was an important center of the Muslim world in the 11th century. When travelling from Baghdad to Antioch in the 1060s, Ibn Butlan crossed prosperous villages near Aleppo. Earthquakes regularly hit northern Syria in the 11th century. Two earthquakes were especially serious, causing much damage in August and November 1114.

A Seljuk prince, Ridwan, ruled Aleppo when the crusaders reached northern Syria in 1097. His conflicts with his brother, Duqaq, the ruler of Damascus, enabled the crusaders to lay siege to Antioch. Ridwan and Duqaq led separate relieving armies to the town, but the crusaders defeated both. The first crusader ruler of Jerusalem Godfrey of Bouillon was planning the conquest of Aleppo already in 1100, according to Guibert of Nogent. Taking advantage of the crusaders' defeat in the Battle of Harran in 7 May 1104, Ridwan invaded the Principality of Antioch, but its ruler, Tancred, routed him in the Battle of Artah in the spring of 1105. Ridwan did not dare to make raids against Antiochene territories during the following 5 years. Ridwan was a friend of the Assassins. He died in December 1113. Afterward, Ibn al-Khashshab became the de facto ruler of Aleppo.

Rumours about the plans of Tancred's successor, Roger of Salerno, to conquer Aleppo brought about an alliance between the Artuqid emir of Mardin, Ilghazi, and the atabeg (or governor) of Damascus, Toghtekin, in the early summer of 1119. Ilghazi inflicted a crushing defeat on the crusaders in the Battle of the "Field of Blood" on 28 June. Roger perished fighting in the battlefield. Baldwin II, King of Jerusalem, and Pons, Count of Tripoli, hurried to Antioch to save the principality. Ilghazi and Toghtekin joined their forces, but they could not defeat the crusaders in a battle near Tell Danith and returned to their realms in August.

In 1122, Joscelin I of Edessa was captured by Belek Ghazi. The next year, he was joined in captivity by Baldwin II, who was later imprisoned in the Citadel of Aleppo.

Baldwin II who was held captive by Timurtash, son of Ilghazi, was released 29 August 1124, based on an agreement to pay 80,000 dinars and to cede Atarib, Zardana, Azaz and other Antiochene fortresses to Timurtash.

== Siege ==
Baldwin II decided to attack Aleppo to free the hostages, including Baldwin's youngest daughter Ioveta, who were handed over to Timurtash to secure the release payment.

Therefore, he made an alliance with Joscelin I of Edessa, a Bedouin leader, Dubays ibn Sadaqa from Banu Mazyad and two Seljuq princes, Sultan Shah and Toghrul Arslan. He laid siege to the town on 6 October 1124. In the meantime, the qadi of Aleppo, Ibn al-Khashshab, approached Aqsunqur al-Bursuqi, atabeg of Mosul, seeking his assistance. Upon hearing of al-Bursuqi's arrival, Dubays ibn Sadaqa withdrew from Aleppo, which forced Baldwin to lift the siege on 25 January 1125.

== Aftermath ==
Baldwin II and al-Bursuqi forces met at the Battle of Azaz in June 1125, which resulted in a crusader victory.

== Sources ==
- Asbridge, Thomas (2000). The Creation of the Principality of Antioch, 1098–1130. The Boydell Press. ISBN 978-0-85115-661-3.
- Barber, Malcolm (2012). The Crusader States. Yale University Press. ISBN 978-0-300-11312-9.
- Bianca, Stefano (2007). Syria: Medieval Citadels Between East and West. Umberto Allemandi for Aga Khan Trust for Culture. ISBN 978-8-84221-449-6.
- Buck, Andrew D. (2017). The Principality of Antioch and its Frontiers in the Twelfth Century. The Boydell Press. ISBN 978-1-78327-173-3.
- Lock, Peter (2006). The Routledge Companion to the Crusades. Routledge. ISBN 9-78-0-415-39312-6.
- Maalouf, Amin (1984). The Crusades Through Arab Eyes. SAQI. ISBN 978-0-86356-023-1.
- Runciman, Steven (1989b). A History of the Crusades, Volume II: The Kingdom of Jerusalem and the Frankish East, 1100-1187. Cambridge University Press. ISBN 978-0-521-06162-9.
- Köhler, Michael (2013). Alliances and Treaties between Frankish and Muslim Rulers in the Middle East: Cross-Cultural Diplomacy in the Period of the Crusades. BRILL. ISBN 978-90-04-24857-1.
