= Seljuk campaign against Edessa (1115) =

Military conflict in the Levant

Aqsunqur's campaign on Edessa
- Part of Seljuk-Crusader War
Date	May 1115
Location	County of Edessa
Result	Crusader victory: Siege of Edessa failes; Raban and Kisum pledge alligance to the Seljuks

Belligerents
Seljuk Empire: Emirate of Mosul; Emirate of Sinjar; Emirate of Mardin; Emirate of al-Khabur; Raban and Kaisun (joined later)	County of Edessa

Commanders and leaders
Mas'ud ibn Muhammed; Aqsunqur al-Bursuqi, Emir of Mosul; Tumayrik ibn Arslantash, Emir of Sinjar; Ayaz ibn Ilghazi; Sunqur Dazdar; Kogh Vasil's widow	Baldwin II of Edessa

The Seljuk campaign on Edessa was a military campaign that took place in the year 1115, by order of the Muhammad I Tapar, Sultan of the Seljuk Empire, led by Malik Mas'ud and the Emir of Mosul, Aqsunqur al-Bursuqi, against the Crusader state of Edessa.

== Background ==
After the assassination of Mawdud in 1113, Sultan Muhammed I Tapar appointed Aqsunqur al-Bursuqi in his stead, and sent him with an army in 1114, and with him his son Mas'ud as the nominal leader of the army, and commanded all the Emirs of the region to obey Aqsunqur. When Aqsunqur entered Mosul as its new governor, its soldiers (including Imad al-Din Zengi) joined him, then Tumayrik ibn Arslantash, Emir of Sinjar, and his forces joined him too. Aqsunqur al-Bursuqi marched towerds Cizre, Mawdud's governor there surrendered the city. Aqsunqur then marched towerd Harran, its governor tried to seek help from the Crusaders, but the locals opened the gates of the city to the muslim campaign. Then Mawdud left to Mardin and asked its emir, Ilghazi, to join him, but the latter sent him an army of 15,000 men led by his son Ayaz.

== Campaign ==
In May 1115, the Seljuk campaign besiege Edessa, but the crusaders had good ammunition and resisted stubbornly, they even raided the Muslim camp, capturing nine Muslims and crucifying them on the wall of the city. But in the next raid, the camp was ready, and the raid failed and 50 knights were killed, but that didn't help the siege continue, and after 2 months and few days of siege, and due to lack of supplies, Aqsunqur lifted the siege of Edessa, and left to Samsat. On the way, Aqsunqur raided all the regions and surrounding of Edessa, Suruc, and Samsat.

During the siege, Kogh Vasil, Ruler of Raban and Kaisun, died, and was succeeded by his adopted son, Vasil Dgha, under the regency of Kogh Vasil's wife. The regent fortified her lands, and sent a message to Aqsunqur asking him to send an envoy to whom she will pledge allegiance, so he sent Sunqur Dazdar, Emir of al-Khabur, He was received and honoured with money. But while Sunqur was resting as the guest of Vsil Dgha, they were attacked by a crusader force, but the Armenians numbering 100 men and their Muslim allies defeated them. After that Sunqur Dazdar returned with gifts to King Mas'ud and Emir Aqsunqur.

== Aftermath ==
Aqsunqur then left to Shahnan, where he arrested Ayaz and attacked Hasankeyf, as a punishment to Ilghazi for not joining the war himself, which a led to a war between the Artuqids and the Seljuk army.
