= Battle of Azaz (1125) =

Crusaders battle in 1125

Coordinates: 36°10′44″N 36°43′10″E

- Part of the Crusades
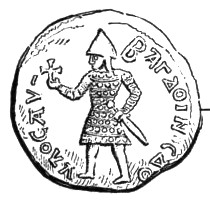
- Coin depicting Baldwin II of Jerusalem
Date	June 11, 1125
Location	Azaz, Seljuk Empire (modern Syria)
Result	Crusader victory

Belligerents
Kingdom of Jerusalem; Armenian Kingdom of Cilicia; Principality of Antioch; County of Edessa; County of Tripoli	Seljuk Turks; Artuqids; Burid dynasty

Commanders and leaders
(Kingdom of Jerusalem) Baldwin II of Jerusalem (Armenian Kingdom of Cilicia) Leo I of Armenia; Joscelin I of Edessa; Pons of Tripoli	Aq-Sunqur il-Bursuqi; Toghtekin

Strength
3,100 1,100 knights 2,000 infantry	15,000

Casualties and losses
20 including 5 knights	1,000–5,015 killed

The Battle of Azaz was fought on 11 June 1125 between King Baldwin II of Jerusalem's crusader forces and allied Muslim forces led by Aq-Sunqur al-Bursuqi, the Seljuq atabeg of Mosul. One of the bloodiest confrontations before the Second Crusade, the battle resulted in a decisive victory for the Crusaders, causing disturbances of power in the Levant and weakening Seljuk domination in the area. Contemporary chronicler Matthew of Edessa even states that the remnants of al-Bursuqi's army were chased all the way to Aleppo. The battle effectively lifted the siege of Azaz and prevented it from falling to Turkoman hands. (One authority says the battle was fought on June 13.)

== Background ==
Joscelin I, Count of Edessa, had captured Azaz in northern Syria from the atabeg of Aleppo in 1118. In June 1119 the Crusaders under Roger of Salerno were severely defeated at the Battle of Ager Sanguinis, and King Baldwin II of Jerusalem was captured while patrolling in Edessa in 1123.

== Prelude ==
In 1124 Baldwin was released, and almost immediately he laid siege to Aleppo on 8 October 1124. This caught the attention of Aq-Sunqur al-Bursuqi, the Seljuk atabeg of Mosul. Al-Bursuqi marched south to relieve Aleppo, which was nearing the point of surrender in January 1125 after a three-month siege. In spite of the city being "the greatest prize the war could offer", Baldwin cautiously withdrew without a fight.

== Battle ==
Later, al-Bursuqi (who had received troops also by Toghtekin of Damascus) besieged Azaz, to the north of Aleppo, in territory belonging to the County of Edessa. Baldwin, Leo I of Armenia, Joscelin, and Pons of Tripoli, with a force of 1,100 knights from their respective territories (including knights from Antioch, where Baldwin was regent), as well as 2,000 infantry, met al-Bursuqi outside Azaz, where the atabeg had gathered his much larger force. Baldwin pretended to retreat, thereby drawing the Seljuks away from Azaz into the open where they were surrounded. After a long and bloody battle, the Seljuks were defeated and their camp captured by Baldwin, who took enough loot to ransom the prisoners taken by the Seljuks (including the future Joscelin II of Edessa).

The number of Muslim troops killed was more than 1,000, according to Ibn al-Athir. William of Tyre gave 24 dead for the Crusaders and 2,000 for the Muslims. Fulcher of Chartres indicates 5 emirs and 2,000 soldiers dead, while Matthew of Edessa estimates 15 emirs and 5,000 troops killed.

== Aftermath ==
Al-Bursuqi retired to Aleppo, leaving his son Masud as governor and crossed the Euphrates to Mosul, where he gathered troops to renew the fight. Apart from relieving Azaz, this victory allowed the Crusaders to regain much of the influence they had lost after their defeat at Ager Sanguinis in 1119. Baldwin planned to attack Aleppo as well, but Antioch, which passed to Bohemund II when he came of age in 1126, ceased cooperating with Edessa and the plan fell through. Aleppo and Mosul were united under the much stronger ruler Zengi in 1128, and Crusader control of northern Syria began to weaken.

== Bibliography ==
- Ibn al-Athir, Ibn (2010). The Chronicle of Ibn al-Athir for the Crusading Period from al-Kamil fi'l-Ta'rikh. Parts 1-3. Translated by Richards, D.S. Farnham: Ashgate Publishing. ISBN 978-0754669395.
- Smail, R. C. (1995) [1956], Crusading Warfare 1097-1193, New York: Barnes & Noble Books, ISBN 1-56619-769-4
- Verbruggen, J.F. (1997) [1954]. De Krijgskunst in West-Europa in de Middeleeuwen, IXe tot begin XIVe eeuw [The Art of Warfare in Western Europe During the Middle Ages: From the Eighth Century to 1340]. Translated by Willard, S. (2nd ed.). Suffolk: Boydell Press. ISBN 0 85115 630 4.
