= Stephanie of Courtenay =

Crusader states noblewoman, 12th century

Stephanie of Courtenay (c. 1120 – 1180s) was a Latin noblewoman from the crusader states who served as the abbess of Great Saint Mary's in Jerusalem. She belonged to the House of Courtenay which ruled the County of Edessa and worked to further her abbey's wealth and standing. She is best known as a source of information for William of Tyre's chronicle of the crusader states.

== Early life ==
Stephanie was born in Edessa c. 1120. She was the daughter of Count Joscelin I of Edessa of the House of Courtenay, and Maria of Salerno, whose brother Roger of Salerno had ruled the Principality of Antioch as regent. Joscelin I died in 1131. The County of Edessa passed to Stephanie's older half-brother, Joscelin II, but was sold to Emperor Manuel I Komnenos and promptly conquered by the Zengid leader Nur ad-Din in 1151. Historian Andrew Buck suggests that Stephanie may have spent time in the Principality of Antioch after the loss of Edessa.

== Abbess ==
Stephanie entered the Great Saint Mary's abbey in Jerusalem. According to historians Bernard Hamilton and Andrew Jotischky, she may have done so before her father's death. When she made her profession, her family endowed the convent. She eventually rose to become its abbess. As such, she had her own seal, which depicted her holding in her hands a crozier and a book. By the time Stephanie came to lead them, the community had already found ways to incorporate the site of their abbey into the story of the passion of Jesus. Hamilton and Jotischky propose that Stephanie may have been the one to introduce the story of Mary, mother of Jesus, being confined on his orders to a room on the site of the abbey as he was led to his crucifixion.

When Amalric, the husband of Stephanie's niece Agnes, became king of Jerusalem in 1163, the High Court demanded that he end his marriage to Agnes. Their marriage was annulled on the grounds of consanguinity, but the reason was so flimsy that the canon law jurist Archbishop William of Tyre consulted Stephanie to explain how the couple were related.

In 1174, a few weeks before his death, King Amalric issued a privilege allowing Stephanie and her community to build houses near the Church of the Holy Sepulchre, potentially bringing them considerable profit. Stephanie's influence at court grew even more during the subsequent reign of Baldwin IV, Amalric's son by Agnes. Stephanie's nephew, Joscelin III, was the seneschal and Agnes queen in all but name. They proved fully accommodating to her wish to consolidate the abbey's possessions. At some point after 1178, she met with the abbot of Saint Mary of the Valley of Jehosaphat, John, and they exchanged the rights each had in the other's estates.

== Death and legacy ==
William of Tyre met Stephanie when she was already "very old", but remarked that she had a good memory. The archbishop described her as "noble by birth and also by character". William, who was then writing a history of the Latin East, considered Stephanie a reliable source of information about the events that took place in northern Syria from the 1130s onwards, and she may have provided an eyewitness account.

Stephanie died between 1180 and 1187. She was succeeded by a woman from south-central France, possibly at the suggestion of the Latin patriarch, Heraclius.

== Bibliography ==
- Buck, Andrew D. (2017). The Principality of Antioch and its Frontiers in the Twelfth Century. The Boydell Press. ISBN 978-1-78327-173-3.
- Hamilton, Bernard; Jotischky, Andrew (2020). Derek Baker (ed.). Latin and Greek Monasticism in the Crusader States. Cambridge University Press. ISBN 978-0521836388.
- Hamilton, Bernard (1978). "Women in the Crusader States: The Queens of Jerusalem". In Derek Baker (ed.). Medieval Women. Ecclesiastical History Society.
