= Baldwin II of Jerusalem =

King of Jerusalem from 1118 to 1131

Baldwin II
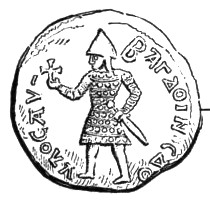
- Effigy on a coin

King of Jerusalem
- Reign: 2 April 1118 – 21 August 1131
- Coronation: 25 December 1119
- Predecessor: Baldwin I
- Successors: Fulk and Melisende

Count of Edessa
- Reign: 1100–1118
- Predecessor: Baldwin I
- Successor: Joscelin I
- Born: c. 1075; Rethel, Kingdom of France
- Died: 21 August 1131 (aged c. 56); Jerusalem, Kingdom of Jerusalem
- Burial: Church of the Holy Sepulchre, Jerusalem
- Spouse: Morphia of Melitene
- Issue: Melisende, Queen of Jerusalem; Alice, Princess of Antioch; Hodierna, Countess of Tripoli; Ioveta, Abbess of Bethany
- House: House of Rethel
- Father: Hugh I, Count of Rethel
- Mother: Melisende of Montlhéry

Baldwin II, also known as Baldwin of Bourcq (French: Baudouin; c. 1075 – 21 August 1131), was the count of Edessa from 1100 to 1118 and the king of Jerusalem from 1120 until his death. He accompanied his kinsmen, the brothers Godfrey of Bouillon and Baldwin of Boulogne, to the Holy Land during the First Crusade. He became the second count of Edessa when the first count, Baldwin of Boulogne, left the county for Jerusalem following Godfrey's death. He was captured at the Battle of Harran in 1104. He was held first by Sökmen of Mardin, then by Jikirmish of Mosul, and finally by Jawali Saqawa. During Baldwin's captivity, Prince Tancred of Antioch and Richard of Salerno governed Edessa as his regents.

Baldwin was ransomed by his cousin Joscelin of Courtenay, lord of Turbessel, in the summer of 1108. Tancred attempted to retain Edessa, but Bernard of Valence, the Latin patriarch of Antioch, persuaded him to restore the county to Baldwin. Baldwin allied with Jawali, but Tancred and his ally Radwan of Aleppo defeated them at Turbessel. Baldwin and Tancred were reconciled at an assembly of the crusader leaders near Tripoli in April 1109. Mawdud, the Atabeg of Mosul, and his successor, Aqsunqur al-Bursuqi, launched a series of campaigns against Edessa in the early 1110s, devastating the eastern regions of the country. Baldwin accused Joscelin of treason for seizing the prosperous town of Turbessel from him in 1113 and captured the neighboring Armenian lordships in 1116 and 1117.

Baldwin I, the first king of Jerusalem, died on 2 April 1118. Arnulf of Chocques, the Latin patriarch of Jerusalem, and Joscelin of Courtenay, who held the largest fief in the Kingdom of Jerusalem, convinced their peers to elect Baldwin of Bourcq as King Baldwin II. Baldwin took possession of most towns in the kingdom and gave Edessa to Joscelin. After the army of the Principality of Antioch was almost annihilated on 28 June 1119, Baldwin was elected regent for the absent Prince Bohemond II of Antioch. The frequent Seljuq invasions of Antioch forced him to spend most of his time in the principality, which caused discontent in Jerusalem. After Belek captured him in April 1123, a group of noblemen offered the throne to Count Charles I of Flanders, but Charles refused. During his absence, the Jerusalemite troops captured Tyre with the assistance of a Venetian fleet. After he was released in August 1124, he tried to capture Aleppo, but al-Bursuqi forced him to abandon the siege in early 1125.

Bohemond II came to Syria in October 1126. Baldwin gave his second daughter, Alice, in marriage to him and also renounced the regency. Baldwin planned to conquer Damascus, but he needed external support to achieve his goal. He married off his eldest daughter, Melisende, to Count Fulk V of Anjou in 1129. The troops who accompanied Fulk to Jerusalem enabled Baldwin to invade Damascene territory, but he could seize only Banias with the support of the Nizari (or Assassins) in late 1129. After Bohemond II was killed in a battle in early 1130, Baldwin forced Alice to leave Antioch and assumed the regency for her daughter, Constance. He fell seriously ill in Antioch and took monastic vows before he died in the Holy Sepulchre. He had bequeathed the kingdom to Melisende and Fulk. Baldwin had been respected for his military talent, but he was notorious for his "love for money".

== Early life ==
Baldwin's birth year is unknown. It is only known that his father, Count Hugh I of Rethel, was born in the 1040s and Baldwin was already an adult by the 1090s. Baldwin was likely born a younger child of Hugh, possibly being his third son. Baldwin's family spoke the Champenois dialect of Old French, but he was probably illiterate. Baldwin was the lord of Bourcq, a small village to the southeast of Rethel, when he joined the army of his kinsman Godfrey of Bouillon at the beginning of the First Crusade. It is not known why Baldwin took the cross, but the chronicler William of Tyre describes him as very religious; Baldwin had callouses on his hands and knees from frequent prayer.

The army departed for the Holy Land on 15 August 1096, and reached Constantinople on 23 December. The Byzantine emperor, Alexios I Komnenos, urged the crusader leaders to take an oath of fealty to him. Godfrey of Bouillon appointed Baldwin, Conon of Montaigu and Geoffrey of Esch to represent him at a meeting with Alexios in January 1097. After Godfrey and his principal commanders swore fealty to the Emperor, the crusader army was shipped to Asia Minor in February.

Baldwin's cousin Baldwin of Boulogne and Tancred of Hauteville broke away from the main army to invade Cilicia around 15 September 1097. Baldwin accompanied them in Boulogne's contingent. He also participated in Boulogne's military campaigns against the Seljuq rulers of the fortresses on the plains near the River Euphrates. After seizing Ravendel, Turbessel and Edessa, Boulogne established the first crusader state, the County of Edessa, in early 1098.

Baldwin rejoined the main crusader army, which was marching towards Jerusalem, near Tyre in late May 1099. He and Tancred seized Bethlehem; there was no resistance as the town was inhabited by local Christians. The crusaders laid siege to Jerusalem, and shortly afterwards Baldwin and Tancred captured an elderly Muslim nobleman. After he refused to convert to Christianity, Baldwin's soldiers beheaded him at the Tower of David to frighten the defenders of Jerusalem. Jerusalem fell to the crusaders on 15 July. Baldwin left Jerusalem in the retinue of Count Robert II of Flanders in late August. Robert returned to Europe, but Baldwin remained in Syria. Godfrey of Bouillon died on 18 July 1100. Baldwin of Boulogne decided to return to Jerusalem to take possession of Godfrey's inheritance.

== Count of Edessa ==
=== First years ===
The crusader states around 1135

Baldwin was staying in Antioch when Baldwin of Boulogne decided to leave Edessa. He was a military commander of the troops of Bohemond I of Antioch who had recently been captured by Danishmend Gazi. Baldwin of Boulogne summoned Baldwin from Antioch and granted him the County of Edessa. Baldwin swore fealty to Baldwin of Boulogne, who left Edessa for Jerusalem on 2 October 1100.

Baldwin married Morphia, the daughter of Gabriel, the Armenian lord of Melitene, which enabled him to consolidate his position among his mainly Armenian subjects. Sökmen, the Artuqid ruler of Mardin, attacked Saruj in early 1101. Baldwin attempted to relieve the town, but Sökmen routed his army, forcing him to return to Edessa. When relating these events, the Armenian historian, Matthew of Edessa, described Baldwin as a coward who was "pitiful in body". Sökmen captured the town, but the fortress resisted his siege. Baldwin went to Antioch to raise new troops before returning to Saruj. He forced Sökmen to leave the town and executed all the townspeople who had cooperated with the Artuqids.

One of his cousins, Joscelin of Courtenay, came to Edessa in 1102. Baldwin granted him lands to the west of the Euphrates. When the Egyptians invaded the Kingdom of Jerusalem in May, Baldwin of Boulogne—who had been crowned king of Jerusalem—sent envoys to Tancred (who ruled Antioch) and Baldwin, seeking their assistance. They assembled their troops and marched to Jerusalem together, but by the time they arrived in late September, the Egyptians had returned to their headquarters at Ascalon. The three crusader rulers made a raid against Ascalon, but Tancred and Baldwin soon returned to their realms.

Tancred's ambitions in northern Syria irritated both Baldwin and Bernard of Valence, the Latin patriarch of Antioch. They started negotiations with Danishmend Gazi regarding Bohemond's release. Kogh Vasil, the Armenian lord of Raban and Kaisun, and Bohemond's Italian kinsmen contributed to his ransom. Bohemond was set free in May 1103. Baldwin granted villages to the Armenian prelate, Barsegh Pahlavuni, because he wanted to strengthen his position among his Armenian subjects.

=== First captivity ===
Baldwin's troops made frequent raids against the fertile plains around Harran. Sökmen and Jikirmish, the atabeg of Mosul, made an alliance and invaded Edessa in May 1104. While their troops were assembling at Ras al-Ayn, Baldwin sent envoys to Joscelin and Bohemond and persuaded them to make a joint attack against Harran. Baldwin, Bohemond and Joscelin went together to Harran and entered into negotiations with the Seljuq garrison for a peaceful surrender. However, both Baldwin and Bohemond wanted to seize the wealthy town and the crusader army started disintegrating because of their conflict.

Sökmen and Jikirmish attacked the crusaders' camp at Harran on 7 May. Applying the tactic of feigned retreat, they drew the crusaders into an ambush, capturing Baldwin and Joscelin. Bohemond and Tancred rode to Edessa to save the town. Benedict, Archbishop of Edessa, who was also captured but quickly released, and the Edessene knights elected Tancred regent for the captive Baldwin. Baldwin was first taken to Sökman's tent, but Jikirmish's soldiers broke into it and dragged him away. Joscelin remained in the custody of Sökmen, passing to Ilghazi upon the latter's death. The citizens of Turbessel paid a ransom for Joscelin in 1107.

Jikirmish laid siege to Edessa, but Tancred routed his troops, forcing him to flee. Jikirmish then took Baldwin to Mosul. Tancred captured a Seljuq princess of Jikirmish's household at Edessa. Jikirmish offered to pay 15,000 bezants in ransom, or to release Baldwin in return for her liberty. Bohemond and Tancred preferred the money and Baldwin remained imprisoned. Before his departure for Europe in the autumn, Bohemond appointed Tancred to rule Antioch and their kinsman, Richard of Salerno, was entrusted with the administration of Edessa.

A Turkish soldier of fortune, Jawali Saqawa, captured Jikirmish and seized Mosul in 1107. Joscelin started negotiations with Jawali over the release of Baldwin. Jawali demanded 60,000 dinars and the release of the Muslim prisoners from Edessa. The Seljuq Sultan, Muhammad I Tapar, made the Mamluk Mawdud atabeg of Mosul. When Mawdud laid siege on Mosul, Jawali left his wife in charge and went to the fortress of Qalat Jabar, taking Baldwin with him. Joscelin paid 30,000 dinars to Jawali and offered himself as hostage to guarantee the payment of the balance. Jawali, who needed allies against Mawdud, accepted the offer and released Baldwin in the summer of 1108.

=== Conflicts ===
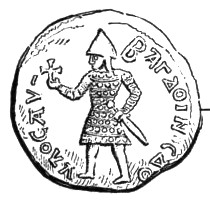
A coin of Baldwin struck in Edessa. 22 mm diameter.

Baldwin went to Edessa after his release, but Tancred demanded his oath of fealty in exchange for the town. Baldwin refused and went to Turbessel. After Tancred carried out a raid against Turbessel, they started peace negotiations, but could not reach a compromise. Baldwin made an alliance with Kogh Vasil against Tancred. Oshin of Lampron also sent troops—300 Pecheneg horsemen—to join them. Their raids against the Principality of Antioch persuaded Tancred to accept the arbitration of the Catholic prelates, who decided in favor of Baldwin; he returned to Edessa on 18 September 1108.

In accordance with his treaty with Jawali, Baldwin released most of the Muslim prisoners held in Edessa. He also allowed the Muslim burghers of Saruj to build a mosque, and executed the unpopular rais (or governor) of the town, who was a convert from Islam. Jawali's alliance with Baldwin alarmed Fakhr al-Mulk Radwan, the Seljuq ruler of Aleppo, which brought about a rapprochement between Radwan and Tancred. When Jawali launched a military expedition against Aleppo, Baldwin and Joscelin of Courtney joined him, while Tancred came to assist Radwan. Radwan and Tancred routed Jawali, Baldwin and Joscelin near Turbessel in late September 1108.

Baldwin fled the battlefield to a nearby fortress. Tancred laid siege to it, but lifted the siege when he learnt of Jawali's approach. Believing that Baldwin had died, the Armenian burghers of Edessa held an assembly to set up a provisional government. After his return, Baldwin thought that the Armenians wanted to dethrone him and ordered the blinding of the ringleaders. The Armenian bishop of the town was obliged to pay a huge fine. To put an end to the conflicts between the crusader leaders, Baldwin I of Jerusalem summoned them in the name of the "Church of Jerusalem" to Mount Pilgrim near Tripoli in April 1109. At the meeting, the King mediated a reconciliation between Baldwin and Tancred, who acknowledged Baldwin's rule in the County of Edessa in exchange for receiving Galilee and other fiefs in the Kingdom of Jerusalem. Thereafter Baldwin participated in the siege of Tripoli, which ended with the capture of the town by the crusaders.

=== Mawdud's campaigns ===
The Seljuq sultan instructed Mawdud to unite his troops with the Seljuq ruler of Armenia, Sökmen el-Kutbî, and the Artuqid Ilghazi against the crusaders. They laid siege to Edessa in April 1110. Baldwin sent envoys to Baldwin I of Jerusalem, who was besieging Beirut, urging him to come to his rescue, but the King did not abandon the siege until Beirut fell on 13 May. Before departing for Edessa, Baldwin I celebrated Pentecost in Jerusalem. The King persuaded Bertrand of Tripoli, Joscelin of Courtenay and other crusader leaders to join his campaign, and the Armenian Kogh Vasil and Ablgharib also sent contingents. On their arrival, Mawdud and his allies lifted the siege of Edessa and withdrew towards Harran.

Baldwin and Tancred accused each other of having incited the invasion. Tancred also claimed sovereignty over the County of Edessa, saying that its territory had been subject to Antioch under the Byzantine Empire. Baldwin I refuted Tancred's claim, declaring himself the head of the Latin East. After a short campaign against the neighboring Muslim territories, the rulers of the other crusader states decided to leave the county. On the King's advice, Baldwin ordered the transfer of the local Christian (predominantly Armenian) peasants to the lands to the west of the Euphrates. Taking advantage of the gathering of the Christian peasants by the river and their mainly Armenian escort, Mawdud attacked and massacred them. Baldwin, who had already crossed the river along with the other crusader leaders, hastily returned and assaulted Mawdud's troops, although they outnumbered his small retinue. Baldwin and his men were only saved by Baldwin I and Tancred, who had followed on the other bank of the river.

In July 1111 Mawdud launched a new invasion against the county and laid siege to Turbessel. While Mawdud was besieging Turbessel, Sultan, the Munquidite emir (or ruler) of Shaizar, sent envoys to him, seeking his assistance against Tancred. Mawdud lifted the siege of Turbessel and moved to help Shaizar. Toghtekin, the atabeg of Damascus, joined him and they decided to reconquer Tripoli in September. The concentration of Muslim forces alarmed the crusaders and Baldwin I of Jerusalem summoned all crusader rulers to his camp. Baldwin complied, accompanied by his two powerful vassals, Joscelin and Pagan of Sajar. The smaller Muslim rulers had meanwhile left Mawdud's camp and returned to Mesopotamia. Mawdud did not risk a pitched battle with the united crusader armies and retired first to Shaizar, and later to Mosul. In April 1112, Mawdud returned and besieged Edessa. His agents started secret negotiations with some Armenian soldiers in the town, but Joscelin, who was informed of the plot, warned Baldwin. Mawdud could not capture the town and withdrew to Mosul in June. Next year, he was murdered by Assassins at Damascus.

=== Expansion ===
Mawdud's invasions devastated the eastern regions of the county, but Joscelin's fief at Turbessel still flourished. In 1113 Baldwin persuaded Joscelin to come to Edessa, saying that he was dying and wanted to make his last will. Stating that Joscelin had not sent enough food to Edessa, Baldwin had him imprisoned and only released him after Joscelin renounced Turbessel. Joscelin soon left the county for Jerusalem, where Baldwin I granted Galilee to him. A new reconciliation between the crusader leaders was brought about by marriage alliances: Baldwin's sister, Cecilia, was given in marriage to Roger of Salerno, who had succeeded Tancred in Antioch in late 1112; and Joscelin married Roger's sister, Maria.

While Baldwin was away from his capital to take possession of Turbessel, the Armenians of Edessa continued to plot against him. He returned to the town and ordered the transportation of the Armenian townspeople to Samosata. After the Armenians started to move to Kaisun, Baldwin allowed those who remained in Samosata to return to Edessa in early 1114.

Mawdud's successor, Aqsunqur al-Bursuqi, invaded the county in May 1114, but Edessa resisted his siege, forcing him to return to Mosul. The Sultan made Bursuq ibn Bursuq of Hamadan the supreme commander of the Seljuq armies. Bursuq moved on Edessa in early 1115, but he soon left for Aleppo. Lulu el-Yaya, the atabeg of Aleppo, sought assistance from Ilghazi and Toghtekin, who also persuaded Roger of Salerno to join their coalition against Bursuq. At Roger's request, Baldwin I of Jerusalem, Pons of Tripoli and Baldwin also gathered their troops at Apamea in August. Bursuq chose to retreat and the crusader rulers dispersed.

Taking advantage of the weakening of the Seljuqs' power after Roger of Salerno's victory at the Battle of Sarmin, Baldwin decided to annex the small Armenian principalities in the valley of the Euphrates. The Armenian Thoros I of Cilicia captured Kogh Vasil's successor, Vasil Dgha, who had made an alliance with Bursuq. Thoros sold Vasil Dgha to Baldwin, who forced his prisoner to renounce Raban and Kaisun in 1116. Next, Baldwin laid siege to Abu'l-Garib's fortress of Birejik. The siege lasted for a year and Ablgharib was forced into surrender in 1117. Baldwin granted the fortress to his cousin, Waleran of Le Puiset. In the same year, Kogh Vasil's brother, Bagrat, had to abandon Cyrrhus and Baldwin captured Constantine of Gargar.

== King of Jerusalem ==
=== Accession to the throne ===
The childless Baldwin I of Jerusalem died on 2 April 1118, during a campaign against Egypt. According to the contemporaneous Albert of Aachen he had willed the kingdom to his eldest brother, Eustace III of Boulogne, "if by chance he would come", but also stipulated that Baldwin of Bourcq should be elected king if Eustace were unable to come "because of his age". Baldwin arrived in Jerusalem around the day when the late king's body was carried into the town. Albert of Aachen stated that Baldwin had come to celebrate Easter in Jerusalem without having any knowledge of the King's death. Decades later, William of Tyre recorded that Baldwin had been informed of his kinsman's death during his journey to Jerusalem.

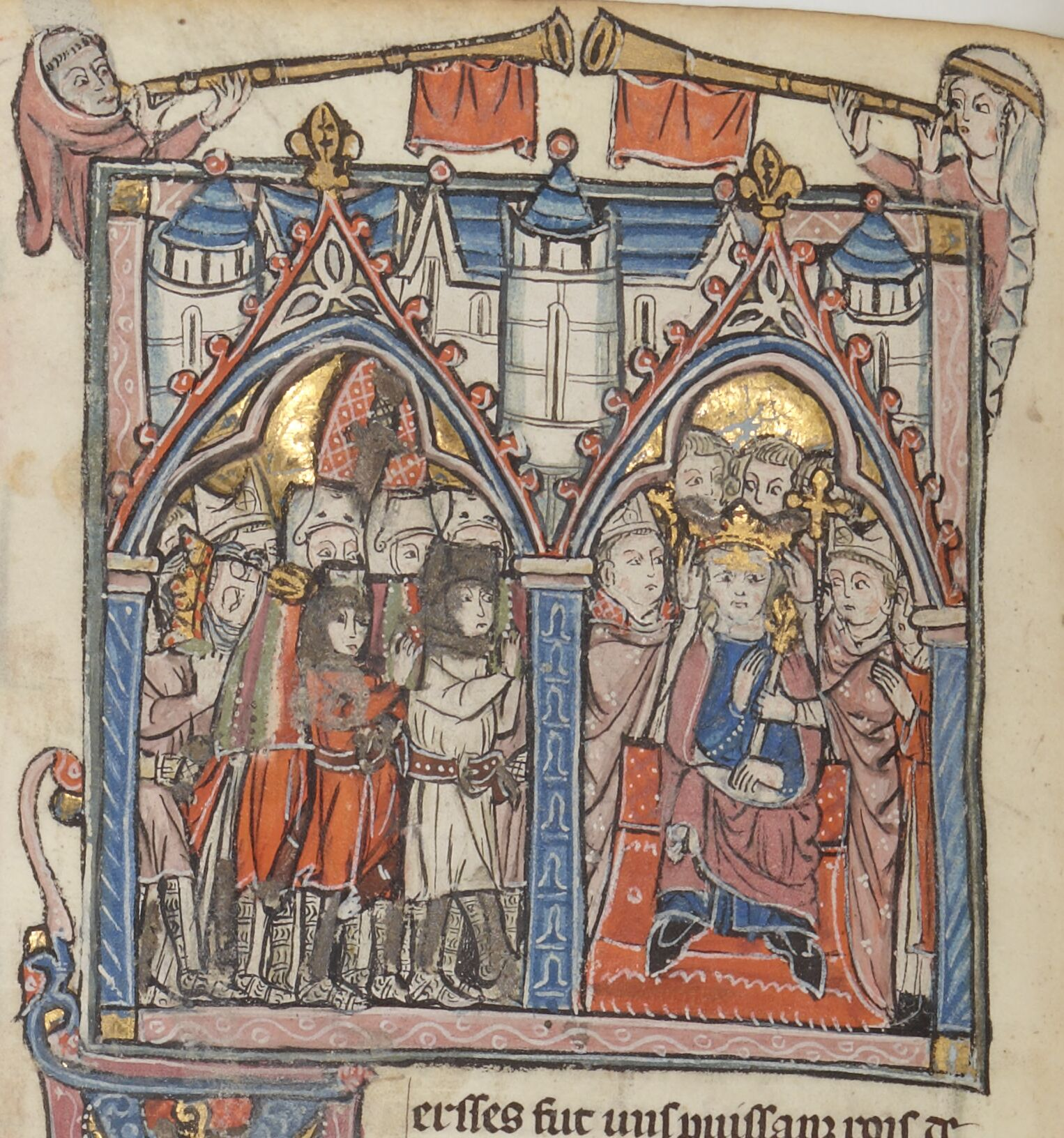
Baldwin's coronation

The question of Baldwin I's succession divided the barons and the prelates, according to William of Tyre. The highest-ranking prelate, Arnulf of Chocques, the Latin patriarch of Jerusalem, and Joscelin of Courtenay, who held the largest fief in the kingdom, argued that Baldwin should be elected without delay to avoid an interregnum. Others maintained that the crown should first be offered to Eustace in accordance with Baldwin I's last will. Some "great nobles", whom William of Tyre did not name, were appointed to inform Eustace of his brother's death. However, shortly after their departure, on Easter Day (14 April), Baldwin was anointed. His coronation was delayed for unknown reasons. Historian Malcolm Barber believes that Baldwin wished to be crowned along with his wife, who was not in the kingdom at the time.

Baldwin promised the County of Edessa to Joscelin, but Joscelin remained in the kingdom to secure the defence of Galilee. Baldwin convoked the noblemen to an assembly "on an appointed day" to receive "fealty and an oath of allegiance from them", according to Albert of Aachen. He also secured the direct royal control of eight important towns, including Nablus, Jaffa, Acre, Sidon and Tiberias. The modern historian Alan Murray argues that Albert of Aachen's words are evidence that Baldwin "carried out a major distribution of fiefs, granting out some lordships but retaining other towns and territories as domain lands" in 1118. Baldwin also reorganized the royal household, making Hugh Caulis constable, Pagan butler, and John the chamberlain.

Eustace accepted the barons' invitation and left Boulogne for Jerusalem. He had travelled as far as Apulia when he was informed of Baldwin's accession to the throne. The delegates tried to convince him to continue his journey, saying that Baldwin's election was illegal, but Eustace preferred to return home.

=== Muslim threat ===
Baldwin I's last campaign against Egypt brought about a rapprochement between Egypt and Damascus. Baldwin II sent envoys to Toghtekin in Damascus to argue against his making an alliance with the Egyptian vizier, Al-Afdal Shahanshah, but Toghtekin demanded Oultrejourdain in return for his neutrality. Toghtekin launched an incursion against Galilee and Al-Afdal gathered his troops near Ascalon in May or June 1118. Baldwin hurried to the southern frontier and urged Roger and Pons to send reinforcements from Antioch and Tripoli. Neither the Egyptians nor the crusaders risked a pitched battle and both armies were dissolved three months later. Baldwin and Joscelin made a raid against Damascene territory in the autumn and defeated Toghtekin's son, Taj al-Muluk Buri near Daraa.

Ilghazi, Toghtekin and the Munquidites of Shaizar made an alliance and their troops started raiding Antioch and Edessa in May 1119. Roger sent envoys to Baldwin, urging him to come to the north to fight against the invaders. The envoys met with Baldwin in Tiberias, because he had just concluded a short campaign against a Bedouin tribe in Oultrejourdain. He gathered troops and departed for Antioch, taking a portion of the True Cross with him. Roger did not wait until Baldwin's arrival and marched from Antioch. On the plains of Sarmada Ilghazi's army encircled the crusaders' camp and on 28 June inflicted a major defeat in the Battle of the "Field of Blood". Roger and hundreds of his soldiers died fighting and most who survived the battle were taken prisoner. Antioch was left almost undefended, but Ilghazi did not attack the city.

Baldwin and Pons of Tripoli reached Antioch in late July or early August. The leaders of the city acknowledged Baldwin as regent for the lawful prince, the ten-year old Bohemond II, who was living in southern Italy. Baldwin distributed the estates of the noblemen who had perished in the Field of Blood among his retainers, mainly through giving the widows of the deceased lords to them in marriage. Meanwhile, Ilghazi and Toghtekin joined their forces and started to capture the Antiochene fortresses to the east of the Orontes River. Baldwin gathered almost all available crusader troops and marched against the Muslims as far as Tell Danith near Zardana. The crusaders and the united armies of Toghtekin and Ilghazi clashed in the Battle of Hab on 14 August. According to Walter the Chancellor, the crusaders routed the Muslims, but Matthew of Edessa stated that "neither side was defeated nor was victorious". Baldwin returned to Antioch two days later, where the townspeople and the patriarch gave him a "victor's welcome". Before leaving Antioch, he granted the County of Edessa to Joscelin of Courtenay.

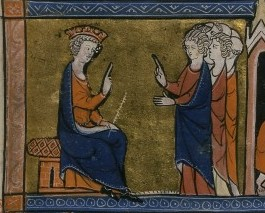
Baldwin presiding at a council

Baldwin and his wife were crowned king and queen in Bethlehem on Christmas Day. He and the Patriarch held a general assembly at the Council of Nablus on 16 January 1120. The prelates and noblemen who attended the meeting confirmed the clergy's right to collect the tithe and to bear arms "in the cause of defense". The council also ordered the punishment of adulterers, pimps, sodomites and bigamists, and prohibited sexual relations between Christians and Muslims. Other decrees established penalties against thieves and those who falsely accused others of crimes. The decisions of the council were the first examples of law making in the Kingdom of Jerusalem.

A confraternity of knights established by Hugh of Payns and Godfrey de Saint-Omer to protect pilgrims in the Holy Land most probably received official recognition at the council, according to historians Malcolm Barber and Christopher Tyerman. Baldwin temporarily lodged the knights in the royal palace on the Temple Mount and they became known as the Knights Templar. He offered Nabi Samwil to the Cistercians, but Bernard of Clairvaux ceded the place to the Premonstratensians who built a monastery. Shortly after the council, Baldwin and Patriarch Warmund also sent letters to Pope Calixtus II and the Venetians, urging them to support the defense of the Holy Land. The crusaders especially needed the Venetians' ships against the Egyptians.

Ilghazi and his nephew, Belek Ghazi, invaded Edessa and Antioch in May 1120. Being responsible for the defense of the northern crusader states, Baldwin decided to again lead his troops to Antioch, but a significant group of the Jerusalemite noblemen and clergy opposed the expedition. Patriarch Warmund refused to accompany the royal army and allowed Baldwin to take the True Cross with him only after lengthy negotiations. Baldwin and his army reached Antioch in June. Ilghazi agreed to sign a one-year truce, which secured the possession of Kafartab and two other fortresses for the crusaders.

Baldwin returned to Jerusalem only in early 1121, after Toghtekin made a raid against Galilee. In July, he invaded Damascene territory and destroyed a fortress that Toghtekin had recently erected near Jerash. David IV of Georgia routed the united armies of Ilghazi and the Seljuq prince Toghrul Arslan in August. Taking advantage of Ilghazi's weakness, Baldwin launched a military campaign across the Orontes. In November this forced Ilghazi's son to hand over to the crusaders Zardana, Atarib and other forts that Ilghazi had captured the previous year.

In early 1122 Pons of Tripoli refused to pledge allegiance to Baldwin for unknown reasons. After Baldwin mustered his troops and marched against Tripoli, Pons paid homage to him without resistance. Ilghazi and Belek laid siege to Zardana in June, but Baldwin and Joscelin of Edessa's arrival forced them to lift the siege in July. Belek ambushed and captured Joscelin near Saruj on 13 September. Ilghazi reoccupied Atarib, but he died on 3 November 1122. His lands were divided among his sons and nephews. Baldwin, who was still in Antioch, persuaded Badr ad-Daulah Suleiman, the new ruler of Aleppo, to restore Atarib to the crusaders on 2 April 1123. Baldwin recaptured Birejik and made Geoffrey, Lord of Marash, regent of Edessa.

=== Second captivity ===
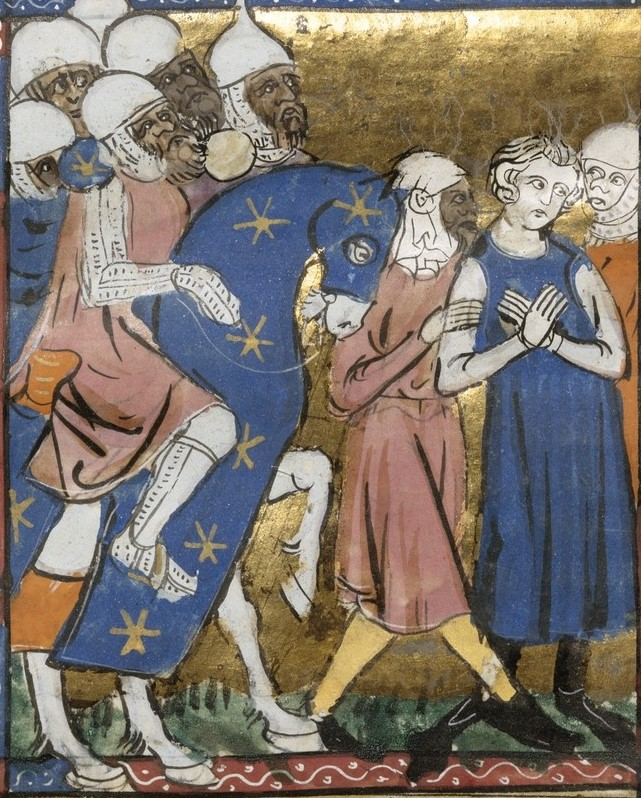
Baldwin is captured

Baldwin made a raid towards Kharput where Belek held Joscelin and other knights' captive, but he stopped near Gargar. While Baldwin was preparing to practice falconry on the morning of 18 April 1123, Belek attacked his camp and captured him. Baldwin was taken to the fortress of Kharput. While Belek was away in Aleppo in June, Joscelin's fifty Armenian supporters came to Kharput, disguising themselves as monks, and expelled the Seljuq garrison from the fortress. Joscelin left Kharput to gather troops in Turbessel and Antioch, but Baldwin and the Armenian soldiers remained in the fortress to defend it against Belek. Belek returned to Kharput and forced Baldwin to surrender. Belek ordered the execution of the Armenians and transferred Baldwin to Harran. Baldwin was later imprisoned in the Citadel of Aleppo.

On learning of Baldwin's captivity, Patriarch Warmund convoked the prelates and barons to an assembly which elected Eustace Grenier bailiff (or regent) of Jerusalem. After Grenier died on 15 June, William of Bures succeeded him as regent. The bailiffs and the patriarch closely cooperated with each other and other high-ranking officials in administering the kingdom during Baldwin's captivity. They made an alliance—the so-called Pactum Warmundi—with Domenico Michiel, the Doge of Venice, offering commercial privileges to the Venetians in return for their military assistance against the Egyptian towns on the coast. They captured Tyre on 7 or 8 July 1124.

The contemporaneous Galbert of Bruges recorded that delegates came to Flanders from Jerusalem during Baldwin's captivity. They stated that Baldwin "was grasping and penurious and had not governed the people of God well". They offered the crown to Charles the Good, the Count of Flanders. Bruges's report shows that a faction of the Jerusalemite nobility attempted to dethrone the captive Baldwin. Being the head of the lineage from which the first two rulers of Jerusalem were descended, and also the overlord of their brother, Eustace, Charles the Good was an ideal candidate for the throne. However, he refused the offer. Murray tentatively associates the leader of the discontented noblemen with the Flemish Eustace Grenier.

Belek died fighting against one of his rebellious officials on 6 May 1124, and Baldwin was seized by Ilghazi's son, Timurtash. Timurtash entrusted Sultan, the emir of Shaizar, with commencing negotiations for Baldwin's release with Joscelin and Morphia. According to their agreement, Baldwin was to pay 80,000 dinars and to cede Atarib, Zardana, Azaz and other Antiochene fortresses to Timurtash. Baldwin also promised that he would assist Timurtash against the Bedouin warlord, Dubays ibn Sadaqa. After a quarter of Baldwin's ransom was paid and a dozen hostages (including Baldwin's youngest daughter Ioveta and Joscelin's son Joscelin II) were handed over to Timurtash to secure the payment of the balance, Baldwin was released on 29 August 1124.

=== Wars ===
Baldwin went to Antioch where Patriarch Bernard reminded him that he had not been authorized to renounce Antiochene territories and on 6 September 1124 forbade him to cede fortresses to Timurtash. On 6 October, Baldwin laid siege to Aleppo where the hostages for his ransom were held. Dubays ibn Sadaqa, and two Seljuq princes, Sultan Shah and Toghrul Arslan, joined him and Timurtash did not support the besieged town. Al-Bursuqi decided to intervene and gathered his troops. On learning of al-Bursuqi's approach, Dubays ibn Sadaqa withdrew from Aleppo, which forced Baldwin to lift the siege on 25 January 1125.

After more than two years absence, Baldwin returned to Jerusalem on 3 April. He renegotiated the Pactum Warmundi with the Venetians, approving most of its terms in the so-called Pactum Balduini, but also stipulating that the Venetians were to provide military assistance to the kingdom. After al-Bursuqi, Toghtekin and Khirkan of Homs captured Kafartab and laid siege to Zardana, Baldwin again went north. Few knights accompanied him from the kingdom, which according to Murray and Barber may have been a sign of discontent over his frequent campaigns. Pons of Tripoli and Joscelin of Edessa joined him and they defeated the Seljuqs at the Battle of Azaz in late May. The battle has been described by historian Peter Lock as "one of the bloodiest engagements in the history of the crusader states". Spoils seized enabled Baldwin to pay off his ransom before his return to Jerusalem.

The careers of some influential lords started around the time when Baldwin returned to Jerusalem in 1125. Walter I Brisebarre witnessed the Pactum Balduini as lord of Beirut on 2 May 1125; Pagan the Butler was first mentioned as lord of Oultrejordain in 1126. According to William of Tyre, Pagan seized Oultrejordain after Roman of Le Puy and his son, Ralph, had been deprived of the territory. Murray argues that Baldwin must have confiscated Oultrejordain from Roman because Roman had been one of his opponents during his captivity. Murray also says that Baldwin allegedly adopted an expansionist policy against Damascus in the late 1120s to assuage the Jerusalemite noblemen's discontent. He made a raid against Damascene territory across the Jordan in early 1126. Accompanied by almost the whole army, Baldwin routed Toghtekin on 25 January and returned to the kingdom laden with booty. Shortly thereafter he supported Pons of Tripoli in capturing Rafniye and in raiding Homs. Al-Bursuqi laid siege to Atarib in July 1126. Baldwin again marched north and Joscelin of Edessa joined him at Artah. Both sides wanted to avoid a pitched battle, and al-Bursuqi retired to Aleppo.

=== Succession ===
After reaching the age of majority, Bohemond II of Antioch came to Syria to claim his inheritance in October 1126. His arrival put an end to Baldwin's rule in Antioch, but Bohemond married Baldwin's second daughter, Alice. Baldwin, who had no sons, made his eldest daughter, Melisende, his heir in 1126 or 1127.

Baldwin had already realized that the Franks were unable to conquer Damascus without further reinforcements from Europe. After consulting with his nobles, he sent William I of Bures and Guy I Brisebarre to France to offer Melisende's hand to the powerful count of Anjou, Fulk V, in the autumn of 1127. Hugh of Payns and his five fellows accompanied the envoys. The embassy first visited Louis VI of France, who gave consent to the marriage. The negotiations between Fulk and Baldwin's envoys lasted for months. In August or September 1127, Baldwin launched a new military campaign against Damascene territory. Historian Steven Tibble proposes that the royal fortress at Wadi Musa was built shortly after this.

Baldwin dispatched Archbishop William I of Tyre and Bishop Robert of Lydda and Ramla to the Holy See. Pope Honorius II stated that Baldwin was the lawful ruler of Jerusalem in a letter of 29 May 1129. Christopher Tyerman and Hans Eberhard Mayer agree that the pope wrote his letter to remove any doubts about the legitimacy of Baldwin's rule. On the other hand, Stephen of La Ferté, who had succeeded Warmund of Picquigny as patriarch in July 1128, turned against Baldwin and demanded Jerusalem for the patriarchate.

Fulk of Anjou arrived to the Holy Land in the spring of 1129. He married Melisende and Baldwin granted them the two wealthiest towns of the kingdom, Tyre and Acre. Hugh of Payns, who had achieved the adoption of the statutes of the Knights Templar at the Council of Troyes, returned to the kingdom accompanied by new crusaders.

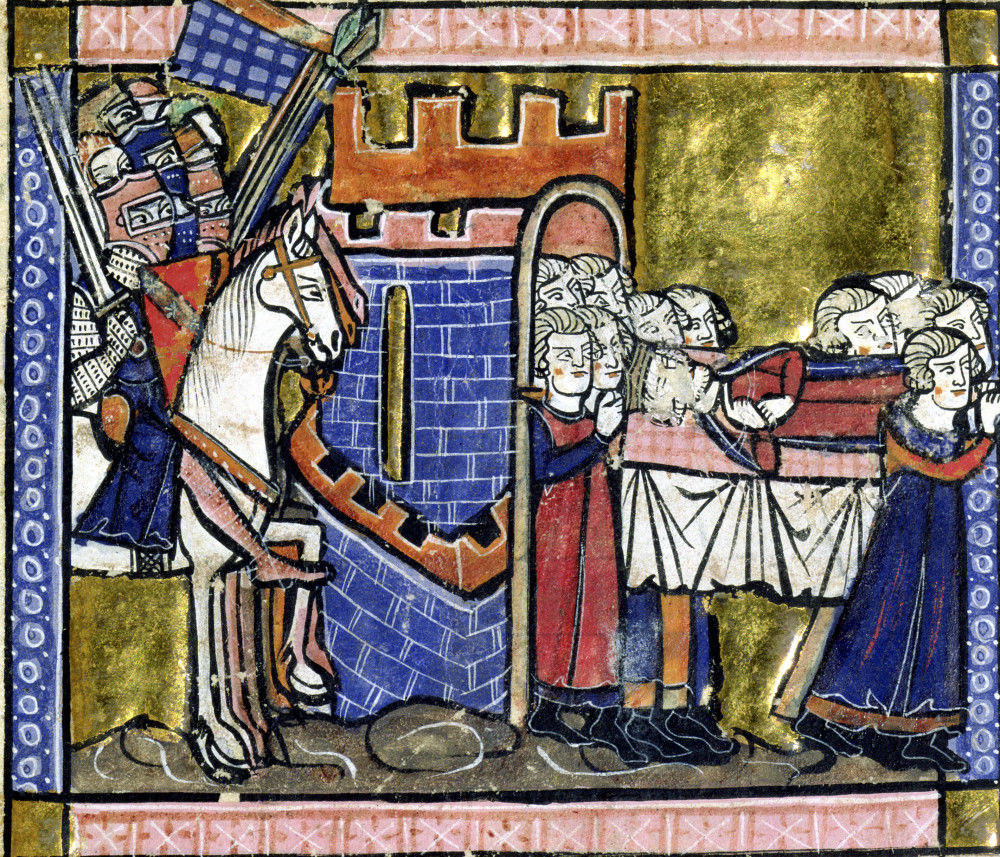
Baldwin's funeral

Toghtekin's successor, Taj al-Muluk Buri, ordered the massacre of the Nizari in Damascus in September 1129. The Nizari's local leader, Ismail al-Ajami, sent envoys to Baldwin and offered the fortress of Banias to the crusaders in return for receiving asylum in the kingdom. Baldwin accepted the offer and his troops seized Banyas. Taking advantage of the presence of the new crusaders, he also decided to launch an attack on Damascus. He gathered all available troops and marched as far as the Wooden Bridge, about 10 kilometres (6.2 mi) south-west of the town, in November. After Buri's Turcoman horsemen routed a detachment of the crusader army and a heavy storm turned the plains around Damascus into a large marshland, Baldwin had to return to Jerusalem in early December.

After the Danishmend Gazi Gümüshtigin ambushed and killed Bohemond II in February 1130, Baldwin travelled to Antioch to make arrangements for the administration of the principality. Alice, however, wanted to establish herself as regent during the minority of her and Bohemond's infant daughter, Constance, and did not allow Baldwin to enter Antioch. She even sent envoys to Imad ad-Din Zengi, the atabeg of Mosul, to seek his assistance against her father, according to the contemporaneous Ibn al-Qalanisi. The Antiochene noblemen were strongly opposed to her plan and opened two gates of the town, which enabled Baldwin to enter. He forgave his daughter but forbade her to stay in Antioch during Constance's minority. After the Antiochene noblemen swore fealty to him and Constance, Baldwin appointed Joscelin of Edessa to administer the principality.

According to William of Tyre, Baldwin fell seriously ill after his return from Antioch. He was already dying when he made arrangements for his succession in August 1131. He was transferred to the patriarch's palace near the Holy Sepulchre where he bequeathed the kingdom to Fulk, Melisende and their infant son, Baldwin. He took monastic vows and entered the collegiate chapter of the Holy Sepulchre, where he died on 21 August. He was buried in the Holy Sepulchre.

== Ancestry ==
Baldwin was a younger son of Hugh I, Count of Rethel and Melisende of Montlhéry. He was closely related to the lords of Courtenay and Le Puiset, and other noble families in the Ile-de-France. He was also a kinsman of the brothers Eustace III of Boulogne, Godfrey of Bouillon, and Baldwin of Boulogne, but their exact relationship is unknown.

The main concern are the identities of Baldwin II's paternal grandmother and great-grandmother. The Chronicles of Alberic of Trois-Fontaine (written in the mid-13th century) describes Yvette, sister of Ebles I of Roucy as "mother of Hugh I, Count of Rethel". This is the traditional genealogy given for Baldwin II. Notwithstanding, considering her family history, such assertion is chronologically impossible. Jean-Nöel Mathieu raises the fundamental objection that Ebles I (who died in 1033), could not have had a sister who was still alive in 1081, instead he argues that she must have been confused with the wife of Manasses II.

Alan V. Murray says that the primary sources suggest that Baldwin II's connection to his predecessors "was not particularly close", and that Baldwin was most probably related to their mother, Ida of Lorraine. Thomas Asbridge says that Baldwin was their second cousin instead.

The family tree below is the reconstruction based on the above two records, which makes Baldwin II a first cousin once removed of his predecessors through their mother. Asbridge's view would match the alternate hypothesis that has Godfrey III's wife Doda as Manasses III's sister instead of his mother-in-law. There is also a hypothesis that Judith was Eustace II's sister. However, Murray objects that there is no allusion of this daughter nor of any other connection between the Rethel and Boulogne families in Genealogica comitum Boloniensium', a compilation of the Boulogne genealogy which was being copied and extended by the mid-twelfth century, when the descendants of Manasses III were ruling the kingdom of Jerusalem. The three women in question are in italics.

Manasses II of Rethel	Yvette	Ebles I of Roucy	Godfrey III of Lower Lorraine	Doda
Manasses III of Rethel	Judith	Eustace II of Boulogne	Ida of Lower Lorraine
Hugh I of Rethel	Melisende, daughter of Guy I of Montlhéry	Godfrey of Bouillon	Baldwin I of Jerusalem
Gervais of Rethel	Baldwin II of Jerusalem	Matilda of Rethel	Eustace III of Boulogne
Kingdom of Jerusalem	County of Rethel	County of Boulogne

== Family ==
Most Armenians adhered to the Armenian Apostolic Church, but Baldwin's wife, Morphia, was born to an Orthodox noble family. Her father, Gabriel, gave her in marriage to Baldwin, because he needed the crusaders' support against his enemies. Morphia gave birth to four daughters. She died on 1 October 1126 or 1127.

The eldest daughter of Baldwin and Morphia, Melisende, succeeded Baldwin along with her husband, Fulk. They were crowned in the Holy Sepulchre on 14 September 1131. Baldwin's second daughter, Alice, made several attempts to administer Antioch after Baldwin's death. Hodierna was Baldwin and Morphia's third daughter. She was given in marriage to Raymond II, Count of Tripoli before 1138. Ioveta was her parents' youngest daughter, and their only child "born into the purple" (that is after her father's coronation). She entered the Convent of Saint Anne in Jerusalem around 1134. About 10 years later, she became the second abbess of the convent that Melisende had established at the Tomb of Lazarus in Bethany.

== Legacy ==
Baldwin's contemporaries often criticized him. Matthew of Edessa, who recorded the Armenians' grievances during Baldwin's reign in Edessa, described him as a greedy ruler who had "an intolerable love for money". Bernard of Blois, an ascetic monk who settled in the Amanus Mountains, blamed him for "certain enormities in his way of life". Fulcher of Chartres hinted that Baldwin's captivity was a punishment for sin, because he had never seen other kings who were imprisoned.

William of Tyre described Baldwin as "a devout and God-fearing man, notable for his loyalty and for his great experience in military matters," and said that he was nicknamed "the Thorny" (cognominatus est Aculeus). Ibn al-Qalanisi, who calls him "Baldwin the Little" (Baghdawin al-ru'aiuis) to distinguish him from Baldwin I, remarked that "after him there was none left amongst them possessed of sound judgment and capacity to govern".

== Sources ==
=== Primary sources ===
- William of Tyre, A History of Deeds Done Beyond the Sea, trans. E. A. Babcock and A. C. Krey. Columbia University Press, 1943.
- Galbert of Bruges: The Murder of Charles the Good (Translated by James Bruce Ross) (1959). Columbia University Press. ISBN 978-0-231-13671-6

=== Secondary sources ===
- Asbridge, Thomas (2004). The First Crusade: A New History: The Roots of Conflict between Christianity and Islam. Oxford University Press. ISBN 978-0-19-517823-4.
- Barber, Malcolm (2012). The Crusader States. Yale University Press. ISBN 978-0-300-11312-9.
- Bianca, Stefano (2007). Syria: Medieval Citadels Between East and West. Umberto Allemandi for Aga Khan Trust for Culture. ISBN 978-8-84221-449-6.
- Fink, Harold S. (1969). "The Foundation of the Latin States, 1099–1118". In Setton, Kenneth M.; Baldwin, Marshall W. (eds.). A History of the Crusades, Volume One: The First Hundred Years. The University of Wisconsin Press. pp. 368–409. ISBN 978-1-58684-251-2.
- Köhler, Michael (2013). Alliances and Treaties between Frankish and Muslim Rulers in the Middle East: Cross-Cultural Diplomacy in the Period of the Crusades. BRILL. ISBN 978-90-04-24857-1.
- Lock, Peter (2006). The Routledge Companion to the Crusades. Routledge. ISBN 9-78-0-415-39312-6.
- Maalouf, Amin (1984). The Crusades Through Arab Eyes. SAQI. ISBN 978-0-86356-023-1.
- MacEvitt, Christopher (2010). The Crusades and the Christian World of the East: Rough Tolerance. University of Pennsylvania Press. ISBN 978-0-8122-4050-4.
- Mayer, Hans Eberhard (1985). "The Succession to Baldwin II of Jerusalem: English Impact on the East". Dumbarton Oaks Papers. 38: 139–147. doi:10.2307/1291522. ISSN 0070-7546. JSTOR 1291522.
- Murray, Alan V. (1992). "Dynastic continuity or dynastic change? Accession of Baldwin II and the nobility of the Kingdom of Jerusalem". Medieval Prosopography. 13: 1–27. ISSN 0198-9405.
- Murray, Alan V. (1994). "Baldwin II and his Nobles: Baronial Factionalism and Dissent in the Kingdom of Jerusalem, 1118–1134". Nottingham Medieval Studies. 38: 60–85. doi:10.1484/J.NMS.3.229. ISSN 0078-2122.
- Murray, Alan V. (2022a). "The Greek Inscriptions on the Coinage of Count Baldwin II of Edessa (1100–18)". Numismatic Chronicle. 182: 243–248.
- Murray, Alan V. (2022b). Baldwin of Bourcq: Count of Edessa and King of Jerusalem, 1100–1131. Rulers of the Latin East. Routledge. ISBN 9780367545307.
- Murray, Alan V. (2000). The Crusader Kingdom of Jerusalem: A Dynastic History, 1099–1125. Prosopographica et Geneologica. ISBN 978-1-9009-3403-9.
- Runciman, Steven (1989a). A History of the Crusades. Vol. I: The First Crusade and the Foundations of the Kingdom of Jerusalem. Cambridge University Press. ISBN 978-0-521-06161-2.
- Runciman, Steven (1989b). A History of the Crusades. Vol. II: The Kingdom of Jerusalem and the Frankish East, 1100–1187. Cambridge University Press. ISBN 978-0-521-06162-9.
- Tibble, Steven (1989). Monarchy and Lordships in the Latin Kingdom of Jerusalem, 1099–1291. Clarendon Press. ISBN 978-0-19-822731-1.
- Tyerman, Christopher (2006). God's War: A New History of the Crusades. The Belknap Press of Harvard University Press. ISBN 978-0-674-02387-1.

Regnal titles
Preceded by Baldwin I	Count of Edessa; 1100–1118	Succeeded by Joscelin I
Preceded by Baldwin I	King of Jerusalem; 1118–1131	Succeeded by Melisende; Fulk
