= Dubays ibn Sadaqa =

Dubays ibn Sadaqa (1070 – 29 August 1135), also known as Dubays II, was a chieftain of the Arab Shi'ite tribe Banu Mazyad. Based in central Iraq from his capital at al-Hillah, he was famous across the medieval Middle East as an ambitious military commander, a shifting political operative, and a patron of Arabic poetry.

== Biography ==
Dubays was emir of the Mazyadid emirate and a mercenary commander, often shifting allegiances to preserve his own independence and expand his territory. He inserted himself directly into the succession wars of the Seljuks, repeatedly switching sides between rival sultans, exploiting their divisions to maintain autonomy at al-Hillah. As the caliph al-Mustarshid attempted to reassert temporal Abbasid power in Baghdad, Dubays became one of his primary rivals. He repeatedly marched on Baghdad, leading to open war with the caliphate. Regularly changing loyalties, he campaigned across Syria, allied with Muslim leaders including Ilghazi and Zengi, and made tactical pacts with the Franks, notably Baldwin II of Jerusalem, during a siege at Aleppo.

=== Origins ===
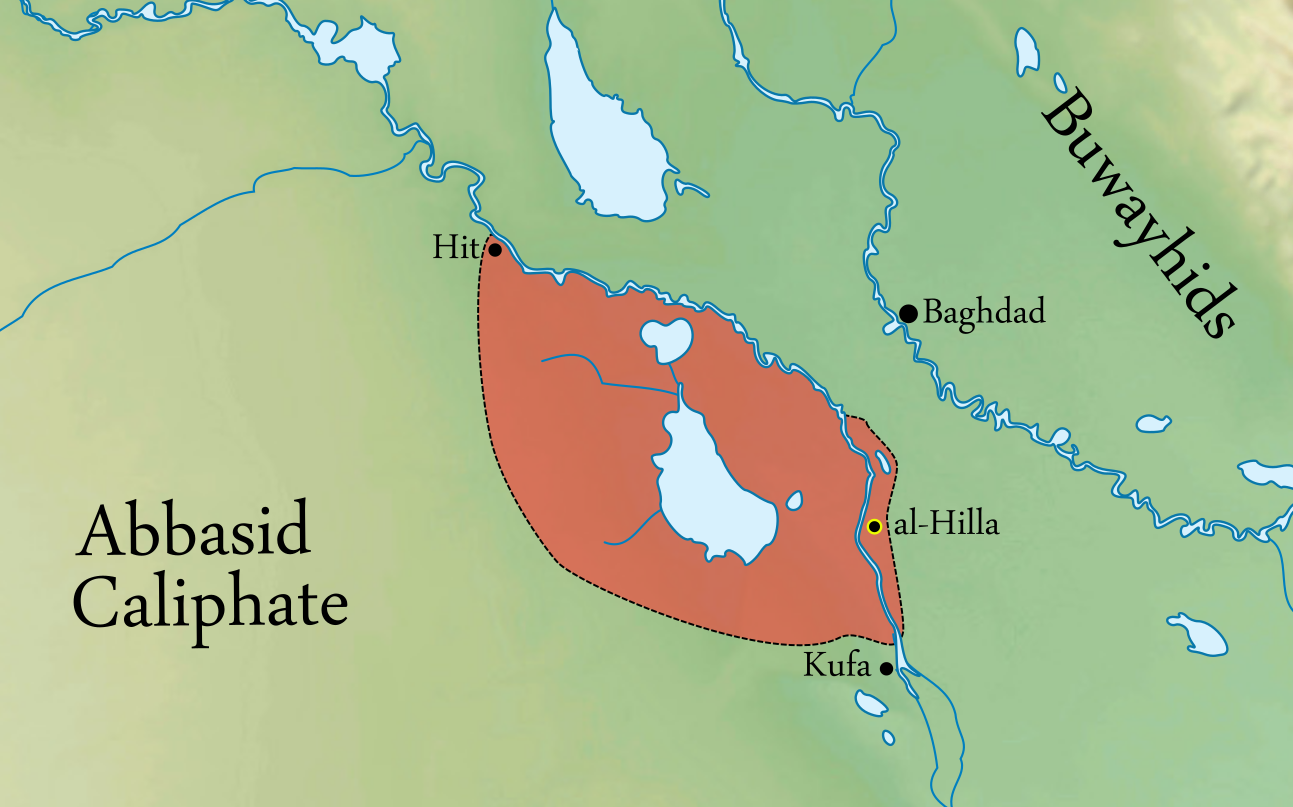
Emirate of the Banu Mazyad c. 1086

Sadaqa, the father of Dubays, belonged to the Banu Asad tribe and became emir of the Mazyadid emirate in 1086. He rose to fame during the troubled ruler of the Seljuk sultan Berkyaruq. Sadaqa was known as the "King of the Arabs" (Rex Arabum) is early Latin chronicles, occupying a position of great influence. When Muhammad I Tapar came to power as Seljuk sultan in 1105, he moved against his overconfident vassal, and Sadaqa was killed in 1108.

Also known as Dubyas II, Dubyas was named after his great-grandfather Dubays I ibn Ali, the second of the dynasty, who served as emir from 1017–1082. Assuming the emirate after his father's death, Dubays governed the critical Middle Euphrates region. Continuing the work of his father, Dubays campaigned against the Seljuk Turks and the caliphs in Baghdad throughout the first quarter of the twelfth century. His stronghold at al-Hillah served as a core center of Arab autonomy amidst the larger power struggles between the Seljuk Turks and the reviving Abbasid caliphate.

=== Conflicts with the Seljuks and Abbasids ===
Muhammad I Tapar died in 1118 and was succeeded as Seljuk sultan by his eldest son Mahmud II. It was not long before the new sultan's younger brother Mas'ud rebelled against him, joining forces with Dubays. In 1120, Aqsunqur al-Bursuqi, then a leading commander of the sultan's army, met Mas'ud and Dubays in battle in Azerbaijan, quelling the rebellion for the time being. Supporting al-Bursuqi was the young officer Zengi whose loyalty to the sultan would soon be rewarded.

An alliance was formed with the Artuqid Ilghazi, emir of Aleppo, by Dubays marrying his daughter Guhar Khatun. In 1121, their combined forces suffered a major defeat at the hand of David IV of Georgia at the Battle of Didgori, with the two commanders barely escaping with their lives. Ilghazi died in November 1122 and was succeeded at Aleppo by his son Timurtash under the regency of Belek Ghazi. Bad blood soon developed between Dubays and Aleppo's new leadership.

In 1122, Zengi was granted iqta' for the city of Wasit and placed in charge of the defense of Basra, likely at the request of the sultan, rewarding his loyalty. That same year, the caliph al-Mustarshid growing weary of Dubyas, installed al-Bursuqi as commander-in-chief (shinha) of Iraq and Baghdad. In the summer of 1122, al-Bursuqi was defeated by Dubyas and his Artuqid followers leading the sultan to call for jihad against the Mazyadid alliance. Mahmud ordered a military expedition from Mosul to southern Iraq, led by Zengi under the orders of al-Bursuqi, then commander-in-chief of the sultan's army. Zengi, in his first major military command, garrisoned his troops around Wasit, and then defeated Dubays' forces at the Battle of Mubarraqiyya in March 1123.

During al-Mustarshid's caliphate, Baghdad was controlled militarily by Mahmud, who installed Ahmad ibn Nizam al-Mulk as the caliph's vizier. During a Seljuk shakeup in 1123, the caliph removed Ahmad from his position. Dubays tried to take advantage of this situation and, after plundering Bosra, attacked Baghdad together with the sultan's brother Mas’ud. They were however crushed by an army led by Zengi and Ahmad.

=== Baldwin II and the Siege of Aleppo ===
In April 1123, Baldwin II was captured by Belek Ghazi and was eventually imprisoned at Aleppo. When Belek died in May 1124, custody of Baldwin passed to Timurtash who wished to leverage the king's captivity to his advantage. One of the conditions of Baldwin's release placed by Timurtash was that the king would assist in suppressing the activities of his bitter enemy Dubays which were increasingly annoying. Baldwin agreed with all the terms and was released in June 1124.

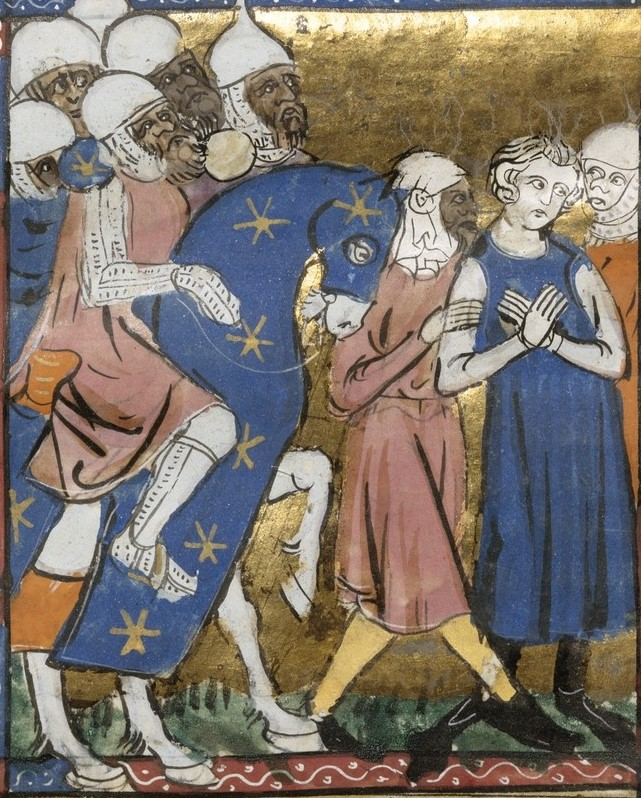
King Baldwin's capture, as portrayed in the 13th century

Baldwin immediately broke the terms of his release. Instead of confronting Dubyas, Baldwin received a embassy from him and the two formed an alliance to attack Aleppo. Dubays immediately attacked Timurtash at Marj Dabiq, routing his forces. Joining the alliance were Sultan Shah, hoping to reclaim Aleppo, and Toghrul Arslan, brother of Malik Shah of Rum. This unusual Christian/Muslim alliance began the Siege of Aleppo began on 6 October 1124. Timurtash remained at Mardin, unwilling to come to the defense of the city.

Ibn al-Khashshab, the qadi of Aleppo, held out for three months, publicly denouncing Dubyas for his treasonous behavior. On 25 January 1125, a relief force led by al-Bursuqi arrived and the siege was lifted. Dubyas moved with his tribe eastward and Baldwin returned to Jerusalem.

=== Political alliances and conflicts ===
In 1127, Zengi left Baghdad to become the atabeg of Mosul, succeeding al-Bursuqi who was murdered by Assassins late in 1126. The next year, Zengi entered Aleppo, taking control of the city. That summer, sultan Ahmad Sanjar decreed that Zengi should be replaced by Dubays in Mosul, but Mahmud II stood by Zengi and he remained.

At this point, Zengi and Dubays became allies albeit with a long history as rivals. Dubays was a wanted man regarded as an enemy by the caliph, and he was captured by the Banu Kalb and transferred to Damascus in 1130. During Zengi's successful Siege of Hama that, he took as captive one of the sons of Buri, atabeg of Damascus, and offered to exchange the prisoner for the release of Dubays.

Both Dubays and Zengi were seeking a delicate balance between competing Seljuk potentates. At one point, Sanjar invited the two to invade Iraq and on 20 June 1132, they confronted the forces of al-Mustarshid at Hisn al-Baramika (Fortress of the Barmakids), north of Baghdad. Despite having a superior force, the caliph prevailed and the expansion visions of Zengi and Dubays were shattered.

=== Assassination of Dubays ===
In later years, Dubays remained closely tied to Mas'ud, who became sultan in 1133. One of Mas'ud's daughters married Dubays' son Sadaqa II and Mas'ud himself married Dubyas' daughter Sufra Khatun. In 1135, Dubays was murdered by Assassins at the same time as the murder of al-Mustarshid.

== Bibliography ==
- El-Azhari, Taef (2016). Zengi and the Muslim Response to the Crusades: The Politics of Jihad. Routledge. ISBN 9780367870737.
- Baldwin, Marshall W., ed. (1969). The First Hundred Years. Setton, Kenneth M. (ed.), A History of the Crusades, University of Wisconsin Press. ISBN 9780299048341.
- Bosworth, Clifford Edmund (2004). The New Islamic dynasties: A Chronological and Genealogical Manual. Edinburgh University Press. ISBN 9780748621378.
- Cahen, Claude (1969). "The Turkish Invasion: The Selchükids" (PDF). The First Hundred Years. pp. 135–176. Archived from the original (PDF) on 2023-01-04.
- Fink, Harold S. (1969). "The Foundation of the Latin States, 1099–1118" (PDF). The First Hundred Years. pp. 368–409. Archived from the original (PDF) on 2023-01-04.
- Gibb, Hamilton A. R. (1969). "Zengi and the Fall of Edessa" (PDF). The First Hundred Years. pp. 449–462. Archived from the original (PDF) on 2023-01-04.
- Nicholson, Robert L. (1969). "The Foundation of the Latin States, 1118–1144" (PDF). The First Hundred Years. pp. 410–448. Archived from the original (PDF) on 2023-01-04.
- Runciman, Steven (1952). A History of the Crusades, Volume Two: The Kingdom of Jerusalem and the Frankish East, 1100–1187. Cambridge University Press. ISBN 9780521347716.
