= Joscelin I of Edessa =

Count of Edessa from 1118 to 1131

Joscelin I
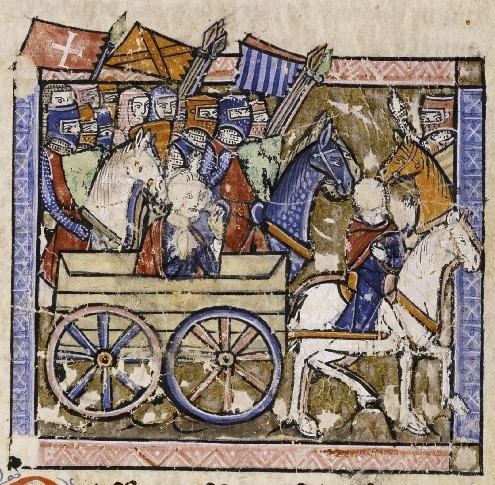
- Joscelin being carried on a litter by his men

Count of Edessa
- Reign: 1119–1131
- Predecessor: Baldwin II
- Successor: Joscelin II

Prince of Galilee
- Reign: 1112–1119
- Predecessor: Tancred
- Successor: William I
- Died: 1131; Kaysun (now Çakırhüyük, Adıyaman, Turkey)
- Spouse: Beatrice of Armenia; Maria of Salerno
- Issue: Joscelin II of Edessa; Stephanie of Courtenay
- House: Courtenay
- Father: Joscelin I of Courtenay
- Mother: Elizabeth of Montlhéry

Joscelin I, also known as Joscelin of Courtenay (French: Jocelyn or Josselin; c. 1080 – August 1131) was a Frankish nobleman of the House of Courtenay who ruled as the lord of Turbessel (1101–1113), prince of Galilee (1113–1119) and count of Edessa (1118–1131). Joscelin came to the Levant in the aftermath of the 1101 Crusade, and served his cousin Baldwin of Bourcq, count of Edessa, receiving lands west of the Euphrates. By 1113, these had formed into a wealthy lordship around Turbessel, but he was dispossessed by Baldwin soon after. He went to the Kingdom of Jerusalem, where King Baldwin I made him the prince of Galilee.

In 1118, Baldwin I of Jerusalem died, and Baldwin of Edessa stood to succeed him. Joscelin supported Baldwin and was in exchange granted the County of Edessa in 1119. As count, Joscelin commanded significant support from his Armenian subjects, and fought constant wars with his neighbouring Muslim rivals in the 1120s. He was captured by Belek Ghazi in 1122, and was joined by Baldwin in 1123. He managed to break out in the Autumn, but failed to immediately secure Baldwin's release as well. Belek's death in 1124 allowed Baldwin to be ransomed from his successor, Timurtash. Joscelin clashed with Bohemond II of Antioch after his arrival in 1126, though they reconciled in 1127. Bohemond's death in 1130 saw a short crisis with his widow, Alice, which ended in Joscelin becoming regent for Bohemond's daughter, Constance.

A Christian coalition defeated the Muslims at Azaz, but the death of Aqsunqur al-Bursuqi led to Zengi using the succession crisis in Aleppo to become the master of Syria (including Aleppo) and Damascus by 1129, and began wars against the Crusader states, including Edessa. Joscelin began threatening Aleppo, but he was gravely injured during a siege. Joscelin marched his army to relieve the besieged fortress of Kaysun, and died soon after. He was succeeded by his son Joscelin II as ruler of the County of Edessa for nineteen years before its fall to the Zengids. During his reign, Joscelin had dealt with religious and ethnic differences in the county, including overseeing a synod in 1129, and making grants to the Hospitallers and monasteries. He was seen as a Frankish intermediary by the Muslim powers in the region.

== First years ==
Joscelin was from the Gâtinais, the second son of Joscelin I of Courtenay and Elizabeth, daughter of Guy I of Montlhéry. Guy's descendants became powerful in the Crusader States and occupied a number of offices, tying Joscelin through kinship to the lords of Bourcq, the lords of Le Puiset, and others. Joscelin's elder brother, Miles, became the lord of Courtenay. His other brother, Geoffrey Charpalu, died in the Levant in 1137. Nothing is known of Joscelin's birth or early years; the historian Robert Nicholson suggests Joscelin had reached military age by 1101 at 20 years old, placing his birth year around 1080.

Map of the routes of the Crusade of 1101. The northern route was that of Joscelin's party

The Franks were triumphant after the First Crusade, but their position remained insecure; the chronicler Fulcher of Chartres believed that the Franks did not have enough men to defend Jerusalem from a Saracen invasion. Energy for crusading remained intense, and Pope Paschal II asked the bishops of Gaul to preach a new Crusade. Though Fulcher called this movement a "second Crusade", it is now called the Crusade of 1101. The first expedition of this crusade set out in September 1100 under the Lombards. Joscelin, who may have been inspired by the success of the first Crusaders, set out in late 1100 or 1101 with the Franks. He served in the army of Stephen of Blois.

Stephen and his army met with Raymond IV of Toulouse at Constantinople. They and the Greek emperor, Alexios I Komnenos, agreed that they should travel to the Holy Land, re-opening the path through Anatolia along the way. However, the Lombards instead chose to travel into Pontus to liberate Bohemond I of Antioch, who had been captured at the Battle of Melitene. Unwilling to split the host, the others went with them. The crusaders rapidly captured Ankara, but afterwards were deprived of water and food by the scorched earth efforts of Kilij Arslan. They then attempted to march north to seize Kastamuni, but on the way were attacked and suffered heavy losses, causing the army to turn back east.

Going east, the crusaders were attacked at the Battle of Mersivan over the course of multiple days. A contingent under Conrad, constable of Henry IV of Germany, was the first to be caught out in the open, and the Lombards were routed a few days later after heavy fighting. Combat continued, and battle was not fully decided until Raymond fled under nightfall, soon followed by the rest of the Franks, which allowed the Turks to slaughter the noncombatants in camp. The crusaders had been annihilated, and four-fifths may have become casualties. The remnants of the army made their way to Antioch by 31 March 1102. Joscelin's fortunes were damaged heavily by the crusade, and when he arrived in the Levant, he had no patrimony and few resources. He does not seem to have played an important part in the crusade, and he was looked over by Alexios. The historian Steven Runciman describes Joscelin as the "younger and penniless son of the lord of Courtenay".

== Early career ==
=== Lord of Turbessel ===
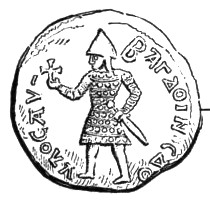
A coin of Baldwin, Joscelin's lord, struck in Edessa.

After arriving in the Levant, Joscelin entered into the service of his cousin, Count Baldwin II of Edessa, who invested him with the lordship of Turbessel that year. His lordship, which probably took up a third of the county, included Cyrrhus, Duluk, and Aintab. In 1103, Joscelin, alongside Bohemond I of Antioch, attacked the environs of Aleppo and seized Muslimiye some distance north. From 1103 to 1104, Joscelin attacked Basarfuth and Kafarlatha, capturing the former. Before May, Joscelin received Marash from Constantine, the lord of Armenia, and to consolidate his position, he married Constantine's daughter Beatrice.

In May of 1104, Baldwin suffered an invasion from Sökmen, the ruler of Mardin, and Jikirmish, the atabeg of Mosul. Baldwin sent envoys to Joscelin and Bohemond, requesting their aid in an attack against Harran. The three men moved to negotiate with the Seljuk garrison for a peaceful surrender, but Baldwin and Bohemond wanted to siege the wealthy town instead. Sökmen and Jikirmish attacked the crusaders' camp on 7 May, using a feigned retreat to ambush them at the Battle of Harran. Joscelin and Baldwin were captured, but Bohemond and Tancred escaped to Edessa to save the town, and Tancred became the regent of Edessa during Baldwin's captivity. When Bohemond left for Europe later that year, Tancred became ruler of Antioch, and he appointed his kinsman, Richard of Salerno, as regent of Edessa.

Tancred was uninterested in assisting Joscelin or Baldwin, but Joscelin was nevertheless able to secure his own release, being ransomed for 20,000 dinars in 1107. At this point, he began trying to secure the release of Baldwin, who was now in the hands of the soldier Jawali Saqawa. Jawali demanded a ransom of 60,000 dinars and the release of all Muslim prisoners in Edessa. After gathering 30,000 dinars, Joscelin approached Jawali and offered himself as a hostage so that Baldwin would be released to raise the remainder of the ransom. Jawali agreed, and Baldwin was released in the summer of 1108. Jawali later released Joscelin as well, trusting that he would raise the required funds, which he did.

Baldwin demanded the return of Edessa, but Tancred refused as he would not pay homage for it; according to the historian Harold Fink, Tancred's selfishness blinded him to the fact that he and Baldwin, by allying with Jawali, could have dealt the Seljukid power a dangerous blow. Baldwin went to Turbessel and joined with Joscelin, where they then sought assistance from Jawali. After a short skirmish, Joscelin, Baldwin, and Tancred parleyed, but no agreement was met. Later, Joscelin and Baldwin, with a few hundred knights, joined Jawali's army of about 500 Turks and more Bedouins, at Manbij. When Tancred came with his own army, a battle happened near Turbessel, and Joscelin, Baldwin, and Jawali were defeated, despite nearly being victorious. In 1109, King Baldwin I of Jerusalem reconciled the two sides at Mount Pilgrim, with Tancred returning his conquests in exchange for his old fiefs in the Kingdom of Jerusalem and confirming Baldwin as count.

From 1110 to 1112, Count Baldwin's territory east of the Euphrates was attacked by Mawdud of Mosul. In 1110, Joscelin was sent as a messenger to King Baldwin begging his aid as Mawdud besieged Edessa, a threat that was ultimately defeated. The king, assisted by Joscelin, besieged Beirut heading northwards. In 1112, Mawdud launched a siege of Edessa, but was repulsed. After the siege failed, Mawdud advanced upon Saruj, a part of Edessa which was then garrisoned by Joscelin, who sallied out and routed Mawdud's army. The Turks then returned to invest Edessa where Joscelin discovered a plot between Mawdud's agents and the Armenian soldiers to overthrow Baldwin, helping him thwart the plan.

By 1113, Joscelin had carved out a semi-autonomous state around Turbessel to the west of the Euphrates, while Baldwin's lands around Edessa itself were devastated. Due to fears of another invasion, agricultural workers slackened their work, which was among multiple reasons for a famine in 1113. Perhaps because of jealousy, and due to rumors of betrayal and impudence, Baldwin began to distrust Joscelin. Feigning sickness, he convinced Joscelin to travel to Edessa to discuss the succession before imprisoning him and forcing him to renounce Turbessel.

=== Prince of Galilee ===
Joscelin travelled to the Kingdom of Jerusalem, where King Baldwin made him the prince of Galilee. Joscelin launched frequent and successful raids towards Tyre. Toghtekin of Damascus and Mawdud invaded Jerusalem in the summer of 1113, and after failed negotiations, Baldwin and Joscelin set out to meet him in battle, with Joscelin as the commander of the Frankish host under Baldwin. The Franks were lured out and defeated at the Battle of Al-Sannabra. However, the Turks did not advance further into Jerusalem, as Baldwin received expected reinforcements from Pons of Tripoli and Roger of Antioch. Around this time, Joscelin had a son, Joscelin II.

Little else is known about Joscelin's rule in Galilee and Tiberias. Most of the sources attribute to Joscelin a series of military successes against the Turks. He made and approved land grants to the church in 1115 and 1119. There may have been a rapprochement with Baldwin, as Baldwin appointed Joscelin's relatives to positions in Edessa. King Baldwin I of Jerusalem died heirless in 1118. When the nobles assembled to discuss who should succeed him, Joscelin urged them to elect Baldwin of Edessa while reminding them that he had been dispossessed by Baldwin and had little reason to like him. Joscelin's voice was greatly influential, as he had become a powerful baron in Jerusalem. Baldwin II thus prevailed over Baldwin I's brother Eustace III of Boulogne and became king.

In retaliation to Toghtekin's raid against Tiberias and Ascalon in May 1118, Joscelin and Baldwin counterattacked and defeated Toghtekin's son at Daraa. Joscelin then devastated Bosra, and launched a raid against a Bedouin tribe in Transjordan alongside 120 cavalry. It was unsuccessful, as Joscelin lost his way and his allies were ambushed.

== Count of Edessa ==
=== First years ===
The crusader states around 1135

With Baldwin tied up in Jerusalem, Joscelin was rewarded with the County of Edessa in late August or early September of 1119. To receive the county, Joscelin swore an oath of fealty to the new king. According to Runciman, Joscelin delayed his travel to Edessa, which was then governed by Waleran of Le Puiset, to defend Galilee, but others date Joscelin's journey to Edessa to September 1119, implying that this fighting had already taken place earlier.

Throughout his reign, Joscelin would align himself with the Armenian population of the county, winning their support and aid. His new crusader state was arranged in a manner similar to feudalism, with lordships in Marash, Saruj, Aintab, Birejik, and other lordships established by his predecessors. Joscelin's accession came in the immediate aftermath of the Crusader defeat at the Battle of Ager Sanguinis, in which the entire Antiochene army was destroyed and its prince, Roger of Salerno, slain. (Note: Roger had sent a distress signal before battle, but there is no evidence that Joscelin heeded Roger's call, as he was preoccupied in Galilee. He may have only marched north at the summons of Baldwin. Waleran, Baldwin, and Pons had rushed towards Antioch. Bernard of Valence had counselled Roger against advancing without their support, but the prince campaigned ahead and was defeated and killed.)

Joscelin subsequently devastated the Dhahab valley, Manbij, and land east of Aleppo, before being repulsed at Ravenden. Ilghazi of Aleppo took advantage of this and invaded the county in May of 1120. Joscelin raised an army at Behesni and attacked the Muslim convoy, dealing heavy casualties, but could not prevent Ilghazi from continuing towards Antioch, where he besieged Zardana. Toghtekin of Damascus arrived with reinforcements for the Turks, but Baldwin raised an army and rushed north, where he and Joscelin signed a truce with Ilghazi. Believing that he was not obligated by the truce, however, Joscelin ravaged Naqirah and the Dhahab valley once again, before attacking Bizaah and burning a section of its walls.

The citizens paid off Joscelin, and the Frankish offensive continued in the summer of 1121, eventually threatening Aleppo itself so severely that Ilghazi offered a truce, sending his son to negotiate for him. With Joscelin present in the parley and Baldwin leading the crusader coalition, Ilghazi relinquished his claims to castles within the Principality of Antioch that he had seized following Ager Sanguinis, including Sarmin, Zardana, and Atarib. In June of 1122, Joscelin and Baldwin repulsed Ilghazi's attempted siege of Zardana. Ilghazi died on 8 November 1122. Around this time, Joscelin married his second wife, Maria of Salerno, who was the late prince Roger of Salerno's sister.

=== Second captivity and return ===
The Seljuk warlord Belek Ghazi besieged Edessa in late 1122 but was unsuccessful, finding the resistance too stout. As he began to retreat, Waleran of Le Puiset requested to Joscelin that they ambush Belek, as he was concerned over his presence in the county. With a hundred knights, the two set out, but Belek lead them to marshy territory near Saruj. On 18 September at the Battle of Saruj, The Franks were mired in the bog, and Joscelin was taken prisoner alongside Waleran and dozens of knights. Despite Joscelin's imprisonment, the free Edessene knights were able to continue raiding Aleppo. Baldwin II was concerned by these developments, and after assuming government in Edessa, launched a counterattack, seizing Bizaah. However, Baldwin himself was captured on 18 April 1123 while on a campaign against Belek, and joined Joscelin as a prisoner at Kharput. They were rescued by fifty Armenian soldiers hired by Baldwin's wife, Queen Morphia, who was Armenian herself; the troops disguised themselves as merchants and infiltrated the fortress where the prisoners were kept. The Armenians then killed the guards and freed the hostages.

However, Kharput was soon besieged by a large Artuqid force, and it was decided that Joscelin should seek assistance to secure Baldwin's freedom. Joscelin was accompanied by three servants when he made his escape, having to slip past Belek's lines and then cross the Euphrates, supposedly on inflated wineskins. With an Armenian guide, he made his way back to Turbessel. He then went to Antioch, but found the principality unable to provide troops, and travelled for Jerusalem by August 1123. Once there, he appealed for aid, but by the time an army was assembled, Kharput had already been reclaimed by the Artuqids, and Baldwin, still in captivity, was moved to Harran.

In late 1123 and early 1124, Joscelin made little headway; he laid waste to Aleppo's hinterlands and repulsed a counterattack at Azaz, while Belek defeated a Frankish force later on. Despite not being able to force Baldwin's release, the Christian pressure convinced Belek to move Baldwin from Harran to Aleppo in February or March of 1124. When Hassan, the governor of Manbij, was captured by Belek's kinsmen in April 1124, Joscelin feared the prospect of Belek becoming his direct neighbour, and launched an attack against Manbij. A battle took place with Belek where Joscelin was decidedly defeated, and he was forced to flee for Turbessel.

=== Offensive campaigns ===
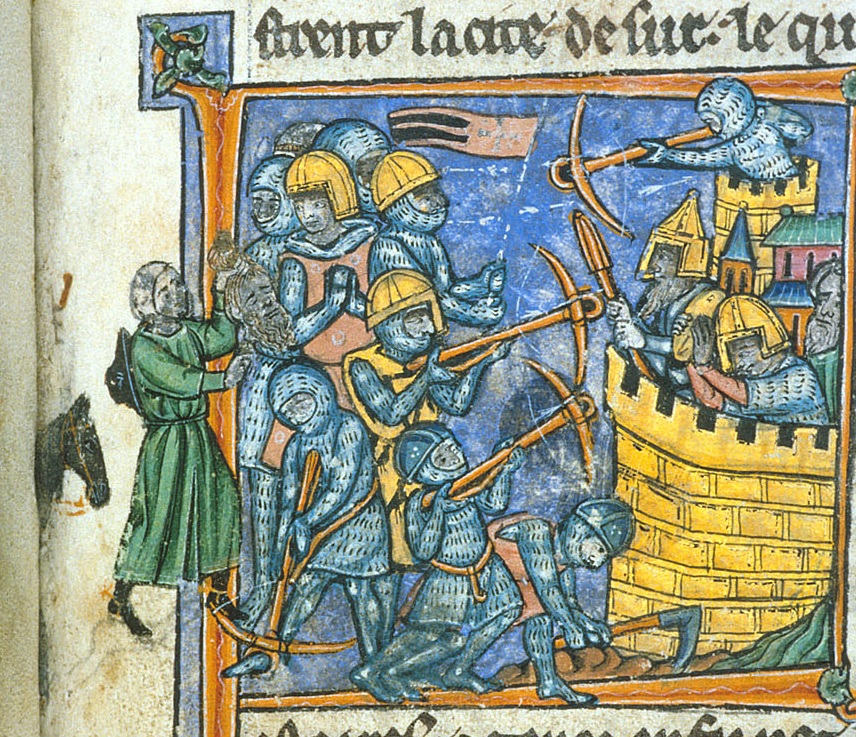
Miniature of the siege of Tyre. The Christian besiegers show Belek Ghazi's head.

Belek executed his prisoners from the battle near Manbij and left his cousin Timurtash to besiege the town, but Belek was killed on 6 May 1124 when attempting to relieve Tyre—which had been attacked by the Venetian Crusade—and Timurtash took over his lands. Timurtash released Baldwin on June 24 on the promise that he would surrender Atarib, Zardana, Azaz, Kafartab, and Jasr; a promise that Baldwin broke in September. On the other hand, Waleran of Le Puiset received no ransom and was executed. Joscelin granted the late Waleran's estates to the Abbey of Saint Mary of Jehoshaphat and its Abbot Gilduin, Waleran's brother in 1126, with the instruction that it should be used for the salvation of his soul.

Baldwin then formed an alliance with Dubais, the Bedouin emir, and besieged Aleppo. After devastating Bizaah, Joscelin and Dubais joined with Baldwin. The siege lasted four months, but was lifted by Aqsunqur al-Bursuqi, atabeg of Mosul. Joscelin returned to Jerusalem, but al-Bursuqi besieged Azaz, forcing King Baldwin to respond. A coalition between Joscelin, Baldwin, Pons of Tripoli, and Mahuis of Duluk was assembled. Baldwin managed to execute a feigned retreat to draw al-Bursuqi away from Aleppo and into an ambush, which was decidedly successful in the ensuing Battle of Azaz, a Christian victory in which Joscelin was "the terror of the enemy". In the ensuing peace treaty, the crusaders secured the release of Joscelin's only son, Joscelin II, who had been surrendered as a hostage for Baldwin's release.

In the same year, the Franks launched a campaign against Homs and Damascus. The forces of Edessa, Tripoli, and Jerusalem besieged Rafaniya on March 31, and devastated Homs' environs in May. al-Bursuqi attempted to besiege Atarib, but Baldwin and Joscelin compelled him to retreat. al-Bursuqi was killed by the Order of Assassins on 26 November, and his son, Mas’ûd ibn Bursuqî, was poisoned soon after, causing a succession crisis in Aleppo.

Fresh conflict broke out in September of 1126 when Prince Bohemond II, the son of Bohemond I, sailed to Antioch in September 1126 with the intention of taking up rule, arriving at the Port of St. Simeon in September or November. He had come in response to an invitation sent to him by the Antiochenes during Baldwin's imprisonment, but relations rapidly declined between Bohemond and Joscelin, to the point that Joscelin, with Turkish allies, devastated Antioch in the summer of 1127 and attained their submission. Baldwin rushed towards Antioch to arrange a reconciliation. Joscelin fell severely ill, and seeing it as divine punishment, agreed to surrender all his booty before swearing fealty to Bohemond. With recognition of his supremacy from Joscelin and Pons, Bohemond married Baldwin's daughter Alice and entered Antioch with an army in late September of 1127.

Taking advantage of the unrest, Joscelin attacked Aleppo in October 1127, hoping to seize the city, but was bought off by the Aleppans. Baldwin capitalised on Toghtekin's death in February 1128 to launch an invasion of Damascus in 1129 alongside Joscelin, Bohemond, and Pons of Tripoli. They obtained the surrender of Baniyas, but soon afterwards became disorganized and were defeated by Taj al-Muluk Buri, Toghtekin's son, at Marj al-Suffar.

=== Last years ===
During the 1120s, the religious framework of the County of Edessa developed, with grants to the Hospitallers. Sometime in 1129, conflicts between Mar Athanasius VII, patriarch of the Jacobite Church, and Bar Cabouni, metropolitan of Edessa, came to a head when the former went into voluntary exile at Diyarbakır. Mar Athanasius came to regret his decision and Joscelin strong-armed the emir of Diyarbakr to release the patriarch, who died soon afterwards. At a synod, Bar Cabouni and the bishop of Sijistan, both excommunicated by Mar Athanasius, received absolution.

Bohemond II died in February of 1130 in an ambush against the Danishmendids, and his wife, Alice, soon began plotting to take over the regency of their daughter, Constance. To enact her plan, she sought aid from Zengi, but her messenger was captured and confessed completely to Alice's father, King Baldwin, who then rushed to Antioch. Breaking Alice's orders to forbid him entry, the citizens granted entrance to the king, his son-in-law Fulk, and Joscelin. Alice was expelled from Antioch and Joscelin was granted rule of the principality until Constance married.

A new Muslim threat arose in Imad al-Din Zengi, who established effective control of Muslim Syria, including Aleppo and Damascus. Zengi's rise was also aided by Frankish disunity from the conflict between Joscelin and Bohemond and internal discontentment within the Kingdom of Jerusalem. Zengi launched a campaign in the spring of 1130 in which he besieged Atarib, and the crusaders' relief effort was soundly defeated. After capturing the fortress, he progressed towards Harim, but was bought off by the citizens of the town, who offered him half of their revenue. Joscelin launched attacks against the territory north of Aleppo, and successfully battled against Sevar, Zengi's commander. When his Muslim ally Dubais fell out of the Seljuk sultan's favour, Joscelin refused him asylum, possibly hoping for the sultan's aid against Zengi.

In 1131, during the siege of a small castle northeast of Aleppo, a sapper's mine collapsed and Joscelin was gravely injured. Following this, he received word that emir Gazi Gümüshtigin was besieging the fortress town of Kaysun. When Joscelin's son, Joscelin II, refused to attack Gazi, Joscelin commanded that his own army should march to Kaysun. Joscelin was borne on a litter, and when Gazi heard that Joscelin's army was approaching, he lifted the siege and retreated. Joscelin won his final battle and died soon after.

== Legacy ==
The expansion of the County of Edessa from 1098 to 1131 (the territory conquered by Joscelin is depicted with the lightest color)

Joscelin was strongly liked by the Armenian community under his rule, and he was less difficult with them than Baldwin had been. Matthew of Edessa calls Joscelin "a brave and mighty warrior." He comments on Joscelin's reconciliation with the Armenians in Edessa, attributing to him a "very humane and compassionate attitude". William of Tyre attributed to Joscelin temperance, prudence, and care, and called him "a man well endowed with worldy wisdom, circumspect in all he did". (Note: MacEvitt stresses the inconsistency and contradiction in Matthew's evaluation of the crusaders.) Nicholson calls his death a "disaster, indeed, for a state facing the readily waxing ambitions of Zengi," and characterizes his son, Joscelin II, as "markedly inferior." The County of Edessa would be conquered by the Zengids in 1146, less than a generation after his death.

Much of Matthew's enmity towards the Franks disappeared upon the rise of Joscelin to the county. Although it is apparent that both Baldwin and Joscelin pursued personal relationships with the Armenian populace of the county, Joscelin was evidently more successful. He is displayed positively in Arabic and Armenian sources as a capable warrior and ruler, and Muslims seem to have seen him as an intermediary for the rest of the Franks. In 1129, it was Joscelin that Zengi made peace with.

== Family ==
Joscelin married Beatrice, daughter of Prince Constantine I of Armenia. They had a son, Joscelin II of Edessa. She died in 1119. In 1122, Joscelin married Maria, daughter of Richard of Salerno and sister of Roger, regent of the Principality of Antioch. They had a daughter, Stephanie.

Joscelin's close family and relationship with Frankish leaders

Guy I of Montlhéry	Hodierna of Gometz
Hugh I of Rethel	Melisende of Montlhéry	Isabella of Montlhéry	Joscelin of Courtenay
Morphia of Melitene	Baldwin II of Jerusalem	Leo I of Armenia	Beatrice of Armenia	Joscelin I of Edessa	Maria of Salerno	Roger of Salerno
Fulk V of Anjou	Melisende of Jerusalem	Bohemond II of Antioch	Alice of Jerusalem	Hodierna of Jerusalem	Ioveta of Jerusalem	Joscelin II of Edessa	Stephanie of Courtenay
Constance of Antioch

== Sources ==
- Asbridge, Thomas (2000). The Creation of the Principality of Antioch, 1098–1130. Boydell & Brewer. ISBN 978-0-85115-661-3.
- Barber, Malcolm (2012-08-02). The Crusader States. Yale University Press. ISBN 978-0-300-18931-5.
- Elisseeff, N. (1991). "Manbidj". In Bosworth, C. E.; van Donzel, E. & Pellat, Ch. (eds.). The Encyclopaedia of Islam, Second Edition. Volume VI: Mahk–Mid. Leiden: E. J. Brill. pp. 377–383. ISBN 978-90-04-08112-3.
- Cate, James L. (1969). "The Crusade of 1101". In Setton, Kenneth M. (ed.). A History of the Crusades. Vol. 11. Madison, Milwaukee, and London: University of Wisconsin Press.
- Fink, Harold S. (1969) [1955]. "The Foundation of the Latin States, 1099–1118". In Setton, Kenneth M.; Baldwin, Marshall W. (eds.). A History of the Crusades, Volume I: The First Hundred Years. Vol. 1 (Second ed.). Madison, Milwaukee, and London: University of Wisconsin Press. ISBN 0-299-04834-9.
- La Monte, John L. (January 1942). "The Lords of Le Puiset on the Crusades". Speculum. 17 (1): 100–118. doi:10.2307/2856610. JSTOR 2856610. S2CID 225089973.
- Lock, Peter (2006). The Routledge Companion to the Crusades. Routledge. ISBN 9-78-0-415-39312-6.
- MacEvitt, Christopher (2010). The Crusades and the Christian World of the East: Rough Tolerance. University of Pennsylvania Press. ISBN 978-0-8122-4050-4.
- MacEvitt, Christopher (2019). "Joscelin, Count of Edessa". Middle East Conflicts from Ancient Egypt to the 21st Century. ABC-CLIO.
- Morton, Nicholas (2020). The Crusader States and Their Neighbours: A Military History, 1099–1187. Oxford University Press.
- Murray, Alan V. (2022). Baldwin of Bourcq: Count of Edessa and King of Jerusalem, 1100-1131. Rulers of the Latin East. Routledge. ISBN 9780367545307.
- Nicholson, Robert Lawrence (1954). Joscelyn I, Prince of Edessa. University of Illinois Press.
- Nicholson, Robert L. (1969) [1955]. "The Growth of the Latin States, 1118–1144". In Setton, Kenneth M.; Baldwin, Marshall W. (eds.). A History of the Crusades, Volume I: The First Hundred Years. Vol. 1 (Second ed.). Madison, Milwaukee, and London: University of Wisconsin Press. ISBN 0-299-04834-9.
- Richards, D. S. (2010). The Chronicle of Ibn al-Athīr for the Crusading Period from al-Kāmil fī'l-ta'rīkh: The Years 491–541/1097–1146: The Coming of the Franks and the Muslim Response. Crusade texts in translation. Ashgate Publishing. ISBN 978-0-7546-6950-0.
- Riley-Smith, Jonathan (1997). The First Crusaders, 1095-1131. Cambridge University Press. ISBN 0521646030.
- Runciman, Steven (1989). A History of the Crusades, Volume II: The Kingdom of Jerusalem and the Frankish East, 1100-1187. Cambridge University Press. ISBN 0-521-06163-6.
- Stevenson, William Barron (1907). The Crusaders in the East: A Brief History of the Wars of Islam with the Latins in Syria During the Twelfth and Thirteenth Centuries. Cambridge: The University Press.
- Tuley, K. A. (2014). The Personal and the Political: Marriage Alliances in Antioch and Edessa. Ohio State University.

Preceded by Tancred	Prince of Galilee; 1112–1119	Succeeded by William I
Preceded by Baldwin II	Count of Edessa; 1118–1131	Succeeded by Joscelin II
