= The Crusades Through Arab Eyes =

French language historical essay by Amin Maalouf

- First edition (French)
- Author: Amin Maalouf
- Language: French
- Subject: History
- Publisher: JC Lattès France; Schocken Books United States of America
- Publication date: 1983; 1984 English translation
- Publication place: France
- ISBN: 0-8052-0898-4
- OCLC: 22435105

The Crusades Through Arab Eyes (French: Les Croisades vues par les Arabes) is a French language historical essay by Lebanese author Amin Maalouf.

As the name suggests, the book is a narrative retelling of primary sources drawn from various Arab chronicles that seeks to provide an Arab perspective on the Crusades, and especially regarding the Crusaders – the Franj, as the Arabs called them – who were considered cruel, savage, ignorant, and culturally backward.

From the first invasion in the eleventh century through till the general collapse of the Crusades in the thirteenth century, the book constructs a narrative that is the reverse of that common in the Western world, describing the main facts as bellicose and displaying situations of a quaint historic setting, where Western Christians are viewed as "barbarians", and unaware of the most elementary rules of honor, dignity, and social ethics.
