= Thomas Asbridge =

British historian (born 1969)

Thomas Scott Asbridge (born 1969) is a British historian at Queen Mary University of London, a position he has held since 1999. He is the author of The First Crusade: A New History (2004), a book which describes the background, events, and consequences of the First Crusade, as well as of The Crusades: The War for the Holy Land (2010), a volume providing a view on the crusading movement, portraying the ideas of justified violence and jihad.

Asbridge graduated from Cardiff University with a BA in Ancient and Medieval History, before earning his PhD at the Royal Holloway, University of London. Asbridge's first major work was a revised version of his doctoral thesis, titled The Creation of the Principality of Antioch, 1098–1130. Asbridge also wrote and presented a three-part BBC Two series on The Crusades, and was the historical consultant for Kingdom of Heaven (2005).

Asbridge has, more recently, expanded his output with books on Medieval England and France, the first major release being The Greatest Knight: The Remarkable Life of William Marshal, the Power behind Five English Thrones in 2015, based on the life of William Marshal, a knight within Eleanor of Aquitaine, Henry the Young King, and Richard I's retinue. Asbridge presented a BBC documentary on Marshal in 2014. He wrote a book for the Penguin Books monarch series on Richard I, which came out in 2018.

== Bibliography ==
- Walter the Chancellor, Walter the Chancellor's The Antiochene Wars, eds. & trans. T. S. Asbridge & S. B. Edgington (Aldershot, 1999).
- Asbridge, T. S., The Creation of the Principality of Antioch, 1098-1130 (Woodbridge, 2000).w
- Asbridge, T. S., 'Alice of Antioch: A Case Study of Female Power in the Twelfth Century', The Experience of Crusading: Defending the Crusader Kingdom, eds. P. W. Edbury & J. P. Philips (Cambridge, 2003).
- Asbridge, T., The First Crusade: A New History (London, 2005).
- Asbridge, T., The Crusades: The War for the Holy Land (London, 2010).
- Asbridge, T., Talking to the Enemy: The Role and Purpose of Negotiations between Saladin and Richard the Lionheart During the Third Crusade, Journal of Medieval History (2013) vol. 39 (3), pp. 275–296.
- Asbridge, T., The Greatest Knight: The Remarkable Life of William Marshall (London, 2015).
- Asbridge, T., Richard I, The Crusader King (Penguin Monarchs) (London, 2018).
- Asbridge, T., The Black Death: A Global History (London, 2026).
