= Banu Mazyad =

Islamic emirate in Iraq

Mazyadid Emirate إمارة بنو مزيد
- c.961–c.1160
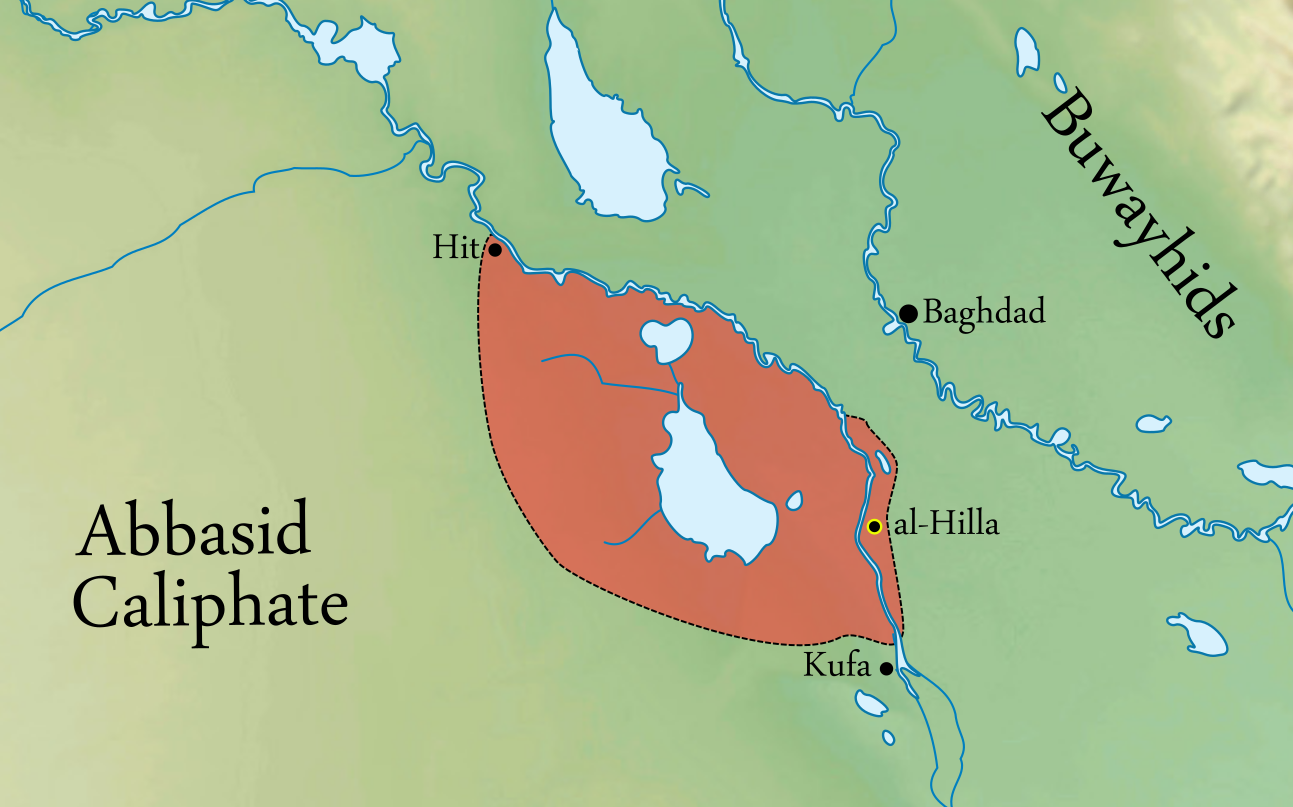
- Emirate of Banu Mazyad c. 1086
- Status: Largely autonomous Emirate under the Buyids and the Seljuks
- Capital: Ḥilla
- Common languages: Arabic
- Religion: Shia Islam
- Emir
  - 961–1017: Ali I (first)
  - 1150–1160: Muhalhil (last)
- Historical era: Middle Ages
  - Established: c.961
  - Disestablished: c.1160
Preceded by	Succeeded by
Buyid dynasty	Abbasid Caliphate
- Today part of: Iraq

The Banū Mazyad (Arabic: بنو مزيد) or Mazyadids were an Arab dynasty following Shia Islam. They belonged to the clan of Nāshira of the tribe of Banū Asad. They ruled an autonomous emirate in the area around Kūfa and Hīt in central Iraq between c. 961 and c. 1160.

Older sources sometimes mistakenly date the beginnings of Mazyadid rule to the early 11th century, but Ali ibn Mazyad's reign must be dated a half century earlier. The Banu Mazyad first acquired titles and subsidies from the Buyid emir Mu'izz al-Dawla in return for military services between 956 and 963. These included lands between Kūfa and Hīt.

In 1012, Ali founded Ḥilla which would later become their capital. Originally a mere encampment, Ḥilla merged with the earlier settlement of Jami'ayn. Under Sadaqa I (1086–1108), a wall was built around the new city and it became the capital of Mazyadid power.

The Mazyadids' chief rivals were the Uqaylids. Early in the reign of Dubays I (1017–1082), the Uqaylids supported his brother Muqallad when the latter challenged Dubays for the emirate. At the establishment of the Seljuk Empire, Dubays threw his support behind the Shia Fatimid Caliphate and the general al-Basasiri.

The reign of the weak Seljuk sultan Barkiyaruq (1092–1105) corresponds to the height of Sadaqa I's power. To the First Crusaders, he was the "king of the Arabs" (rex Arabum in Latin chronicles). After Malik-Shah II succeeded Barkiyaruq, he moved against Sadaqa, who was defeated and killed in battle in 1108. His successor, Dubays II, was equally famous to the Latins and as an Arabic poet.

The later Mazyadid emirs allied with local Turkish emirs against Sultan Ghiyath ad-Din Mas'ud (1134–1152). Seljuk forces occupied Ḥilla on several occasions. Dubays II died in 1135 and was succeeded by his son, Ali II, who reigned until 1150. He was succeeded in turn by his son, Muhalhil, about whose reign nothing is known, including its length. In 1163, Ḥilla was occupied by Abbasid forces and Mazyadid rule came to an end.

The Mazyadids did not mint coin.

== Mazyadid rulers ==
- c.961–1017 : Sana al-Dawla Ali (I) ibn Mazyad al-Asadi al-Nashiri
- 1017–1082 : Nur al-Dawla Abu'l-A'zz Dubays (I) ibn Ali
- 1082–1086 : Abu Kamil Baha al-Dawla Mansur ibn Dubays
- 1086–1108 : Sayf al-Dawla Fakhr al-Din Abu'l-Hasan Sadaqa (I) ibn Mansur
- 1108–1135 : Nur al-Dawla Abu'l-A'zz Dubays (II) ibn Sadaqa
- 1135–1138 : Sayf al-Dawla Sadaqa (II) ibn Dubays
- 1138–1145 : Muhammad ibn Dubays
- 1145–1150 : Ali (II) ibn Dubays
- 1150–???? : Muhalhil ibn Ali
