= Elephant clock =

Medieval invention by Al-Jazari

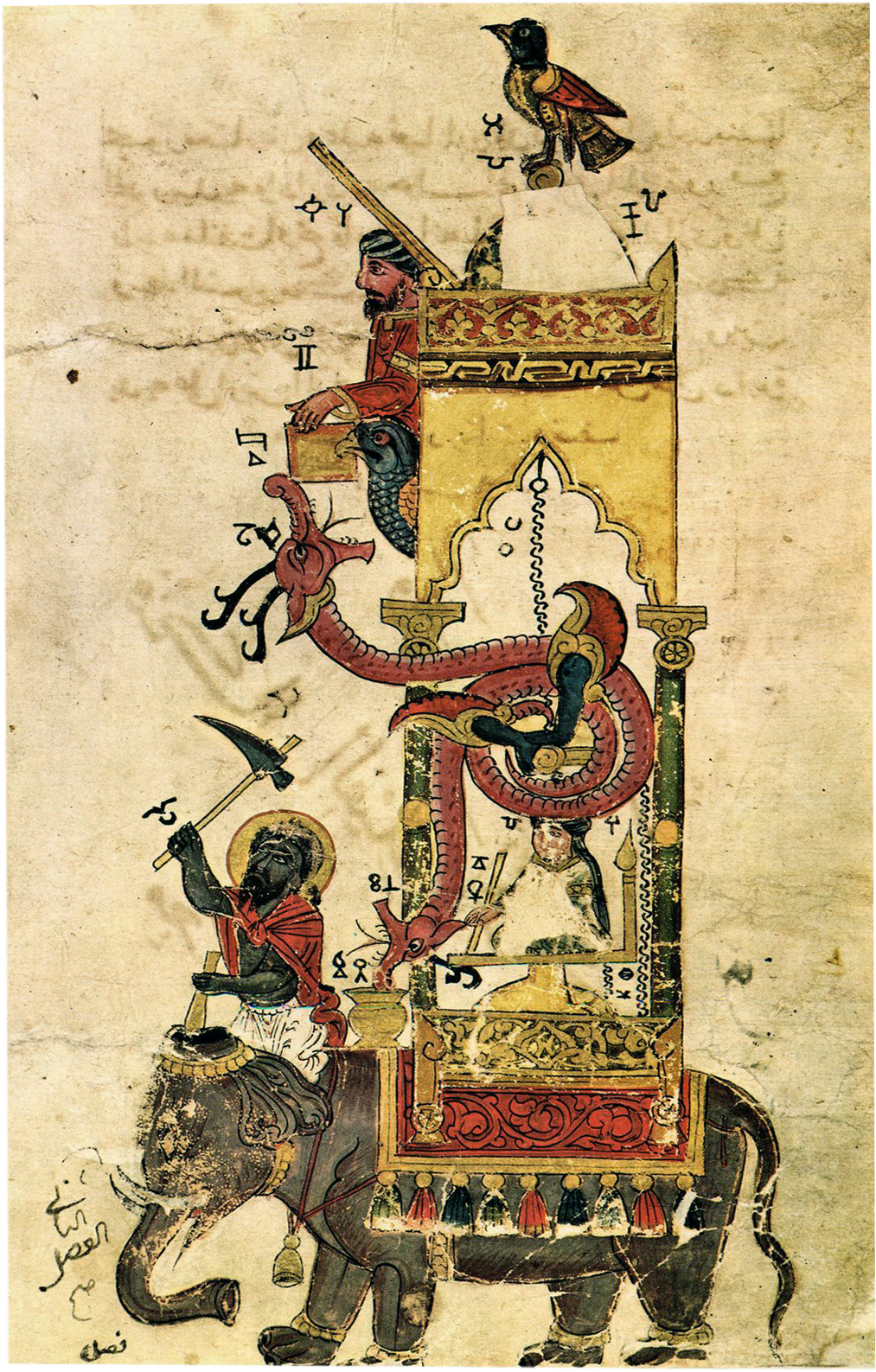
The elephant clock in a manuscript by Al-Jazari (1206 AD) from The Book of Knowledge of Ingenious Mechanical Devices.

The elephant clock was a model of water clock invented by the medieval Islamic engineer Ismail al-Jazari (1136–1206). Its design was detailed in his book, The Book of Knowledge of Ingenious Mechanical Devices.

== Mechanism ==
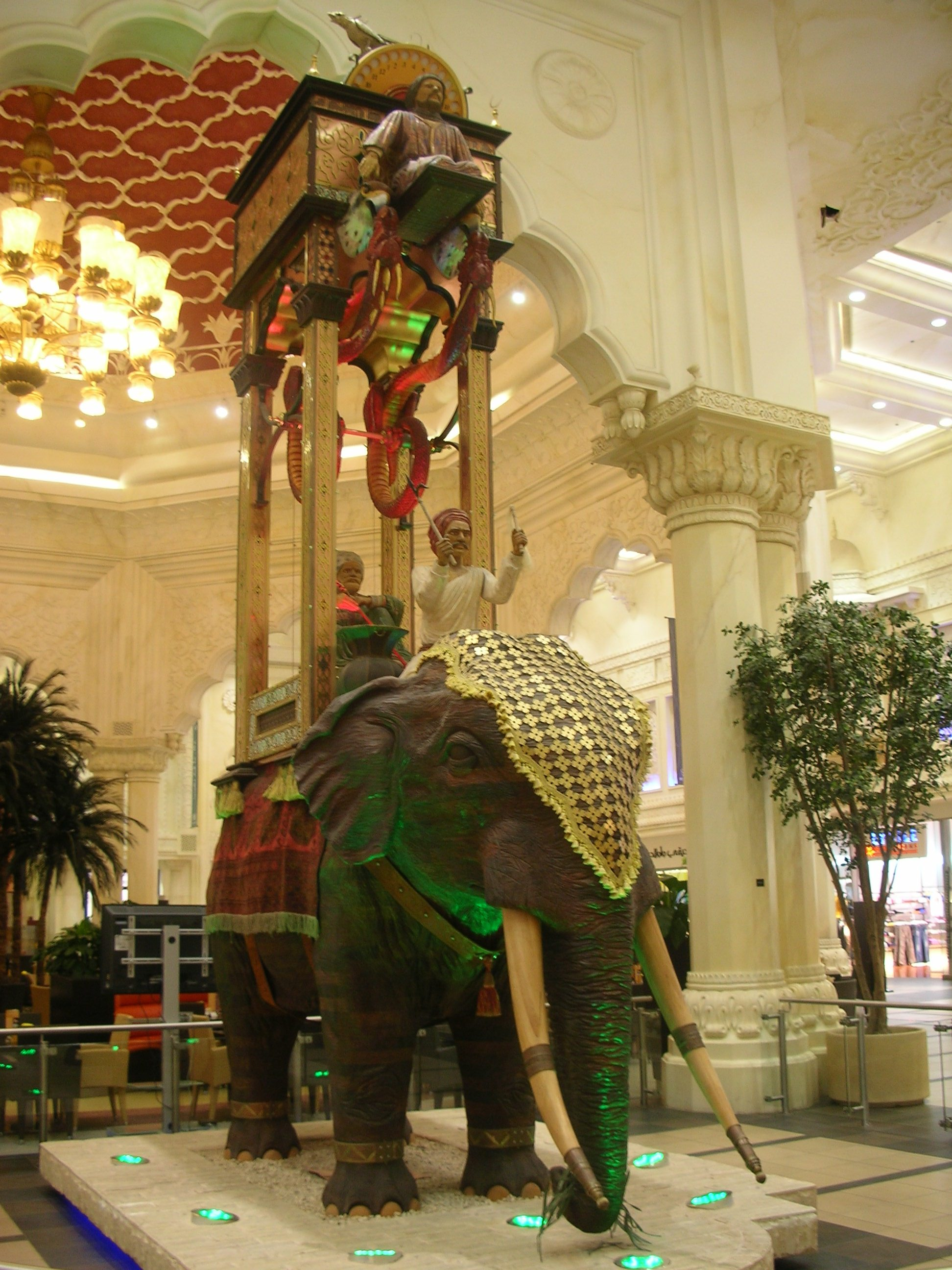
A reproduction of the elephant clock in the Ibn Battuta Mall, Dubai.

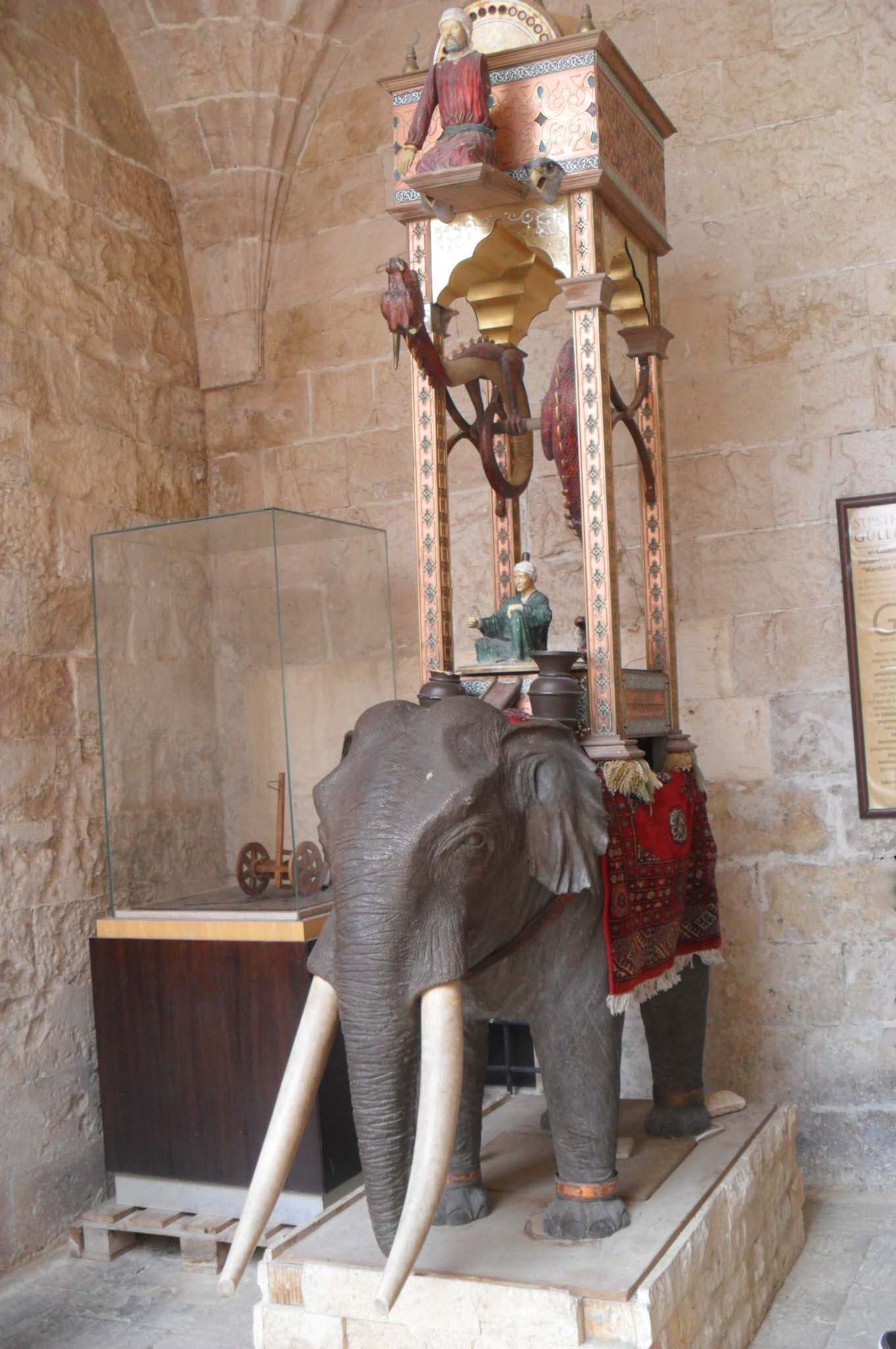
A reproduction in Kasımiye Medrese, Mardin, Turkey

The timing mechanism is based on a water-filled basin hidden inside the elephant. In the bucket is a deep bowl floating in the water, but with a small hole in the centre. The bowl takes half an hour to fill through this hole. In the process of sinking, the bowl pulls a string attached to a see-saw mechanism in the tower on top of the elephant. This releases a ball that drops into the mouth of a serpent, causing the serpent to tip forward, which pulls the sunken bowl out of the water via strings. At the same time, a system of strings causes a figure in the tower to raise either the left or right hand and the mahout (elephant driver at the front) to hit a drum. This indicates a half or full hour. Next, the snake tips back. The cycle then repeats, as long as balls remain in the upper reservoir to power the emptying of the bowl.

=== Automaton ===
In the mechanism, a humanoid automaton strikes the cymbal and a mechanical bird chirps, as in the cuckoo clock.

=== Passage of temporal hours ===
Another innovative feature of the clock was how it recorded the passage of temporal hours, which meant that the rate of flow had to be changed daily to match the uneven length of days throughout the year. To accomplish this, the clock had two tanks. The top tank was connected to the time-indicating mechanisms and the bottom was connected to the flow control regulator. At daybreak, the tap was opened and water flowed from the top tank to the bottom tank via a float regulator that maintained a constant pressure in the receiving tank.

== Modern reproductions ==
Several modern reproductions of the Elephant Clock have been created by the 1001 Inventions organization. These reproductions are featured as part of the 1001 Inventions educational science shows that have been touring around the world since 2006. During a visit to the London Science Museum in January 2010, BBC journalist Nick Higham described the five metre high, working Elephant Clock replica produced by 1001 Inventions as "spectacular".

A modern full-size working reproduction can be found as a centerpiece in the Ibn Battuta Mall, a shopping mall in Dubai, United Arab Emirates. Another working reproduction can be seen outside the Musée d'Horlogerie du Locle, Château des Monts, in Le Locle, Switzerland. Another can be found in the Museum of Science and Technology in Islam in the King Abdullah University of Science and Technology in Saudi Arabia.

== See also ==
- Inventions in the Muslim world
- Dar al-Magana
- Dar al-Muwaqqit
