= Dar al-Muwaqqit =

Type of structure attached to a mosque

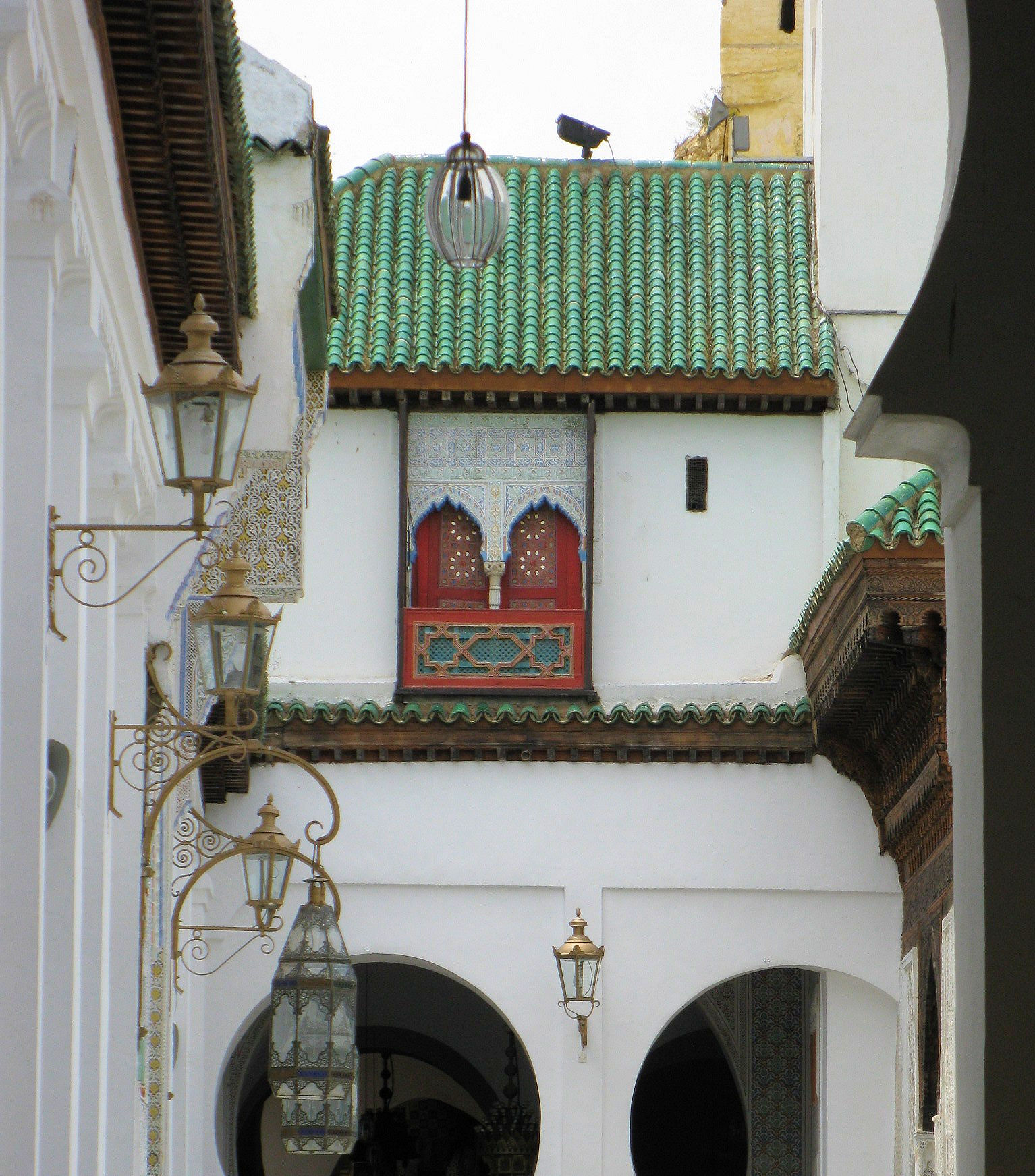
The Dar al-Muwaqqit of the al-Qarawiyyin Mosque (marked by the double-arched window overlooking the courtyard)

A Dar al-Muwaqqit (Arabic: دار المؤقت), or muvakkithane in Turkish, is a room or structure accompanying a mosque which was used by the muwaqqit or timekeeper, an officer charged with maintaining the correct times of prayer and communicating them to the muezzin (the person who issued the call to prayer). Dar al-Muwaqqit was the Arabic term given to such structures added to many mosques in Morocco from the Marinid period onward. In the Ottoman Empire the equivalent of such structures were known in Turkish as a muvakkithane ("lodge of the muwaqqit").

== Role of the Muwaqqit ==
Muslims observe salah, the daily ritual prayer, at prescribed times based on the hadith or the tradition of Muhammad (c. 570–632). Each day, there are five obligatory prayers with specific ranges of permitted times determined by daily astronomical phenomena. For example, the time for the maghrib prayer starts after sunset and ends when the red twilight has disappeared.

Because the start and end times for prayers are related to the solar diurnal motion, they vary throughout the year and depend on the local latitude and longitude when expressed in local time. The term mīqāt in the sense of "time of a prayer" is attested to in the Quran and hadith, although the Quran does not explicitly define those times. The term ʻilm al-mīqāt refers to the study of determining prayer times based on the position of the Sun and the stars in the sky and has been recorded since the early days of Islam.

Before the muwaqqits appeared, the muezzin or mu'azzin (Arabic: مُؤَذِّن) had been the office most associated with the regulation of the prayer times. The post can be traced back to Muhammad's lifetime and its role and history are well documented. The main duty of a muazzin is to recite the adhan to announce the beginning of a prayer time. Before the use of a loudspeaker, this was usually done from the top of a minaret. The minaret provided the muezzin with a vantage point to observe phenomena such as sunset which marks the start time of maghrib.

The main duty of the muwaqqit was timekeeping and the regulation of daily prayer times in mosques, madrasas, or other institutions using astronomy and other exact sciences. At its zenith in the fourteenth and fifteenth centuries, major mosques often employed prominent astronomers as muwaqqits. In addition to regulating prayer times, they wrote treatises on astronomy, especially on timekeeping and the use of related instruments such as quadrants and sundials. They were also responsible for other religious matters related to their astronomical expertise, such as the keeping of the Islamic calendar and the determination of the qibla (the direction to Mecca used for prayers).

== The Dar al-Muwaqqit in Morocco ==
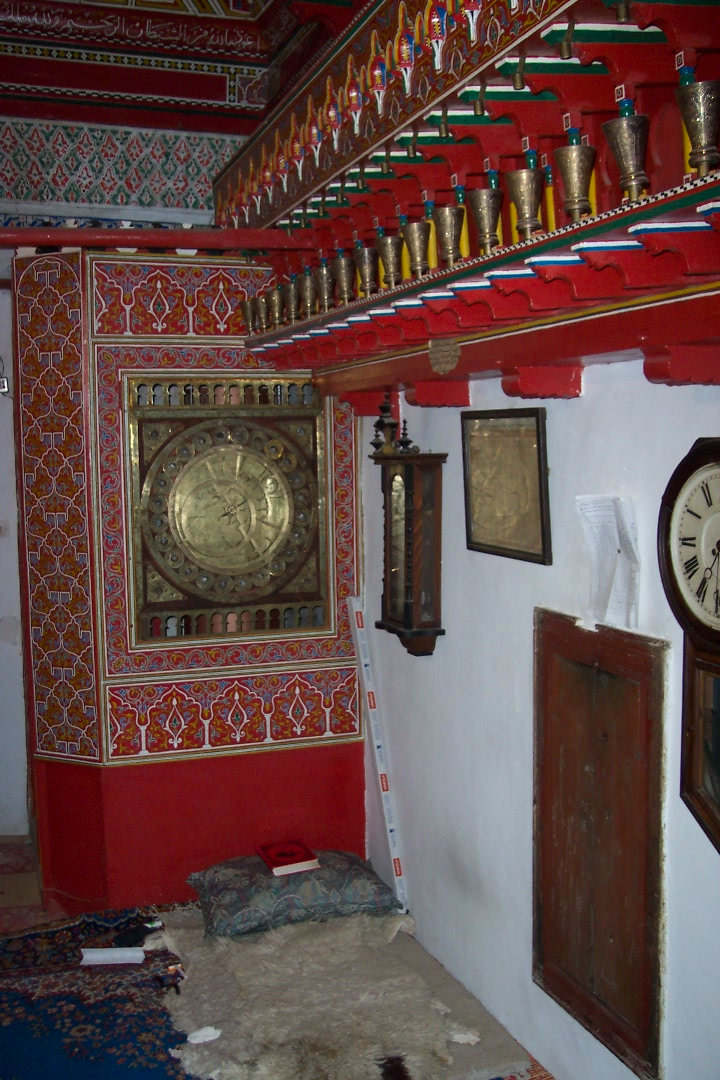
The clock inside the Dar al-Muwaqqit of the Qarawiyyin Mosque

=== Dar al-Muwaqqit of the Qarawiyyin Mosque ===
The Dar al-Muwaqqit of Fes's most important mosque was added by the Marinids in 1286 when renovations were carried out on the mosque's old minaret. The chamber was equipped with astrolabes and all manner of scientific equipment of the era in order to aid in this task. It also housed a number of historical water clocks mentioned in historical sources, of which one survives today. The first was commissioned by the Marinid Sultan Abu Yusuf Ya'qub in the 13th century and designed by Muhammad ibn al-Habbak, a faqih and muwaqqit. Another one was constructed on the orders of Sultan Abu Sa'id in 1317 and was restored in 1346. However, the only one to survive today (though no longer functional) is the water clock of Al-Laja'i. It was made on the order of the Sultan Abu Salim Ali II (r. 1359-1361) by the muwaqqit Abu Zayd Abd al-Rahman ibn Sulayman al-Laja'i (d. 1370). Al-Laja'i had studied mathematics with Ibn al-Banna al-Marrakushi at the Al-Attarine Madrasa. The clock was finished and put in place on 20 November 1361, two months after the death of the sultan.

=== The Borj Neffara or Dar al-Muwaqqit of Fes ===
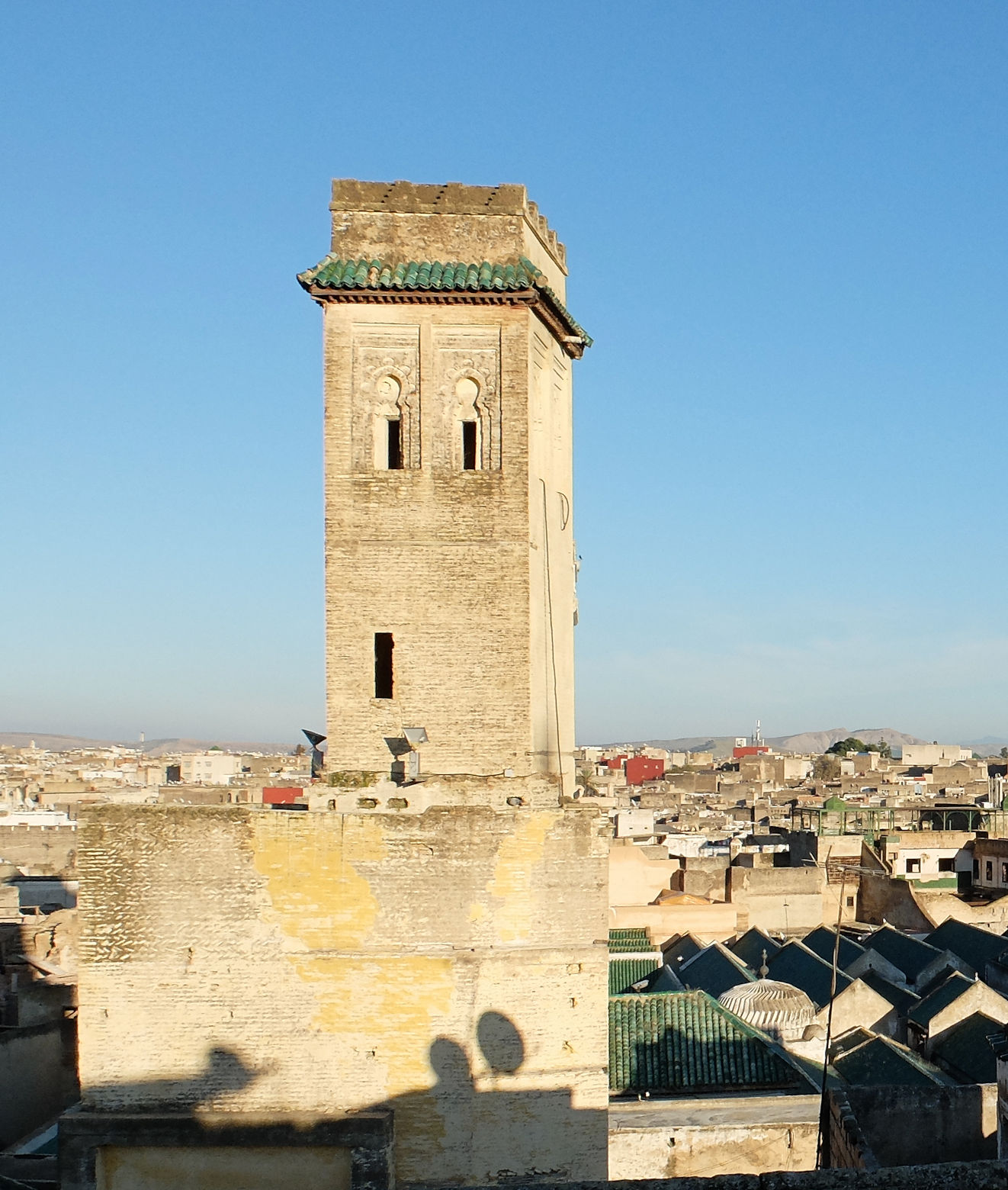
The tower of Borj Neffara in Fes

Another structure known as the "Dar al-Muwaqqit" was built across the street from the Qarawiyyin Mosque by sultan Abu Inan in the mid-14th century. It includes a prominent tower known as the Borj Neffara, which is often mistaken for a minaret. The structure consists of a house with two floors arranged around a central courtyard, with the tower rising on the house's southern side. The tower is reported to have served several functions, including as fire lookout tower, but the principal function appears to have been as a platform for astronomical observation carried out by the muwaqqit.

=== Dar al-Magana at the Bou Inania Madrasa ===
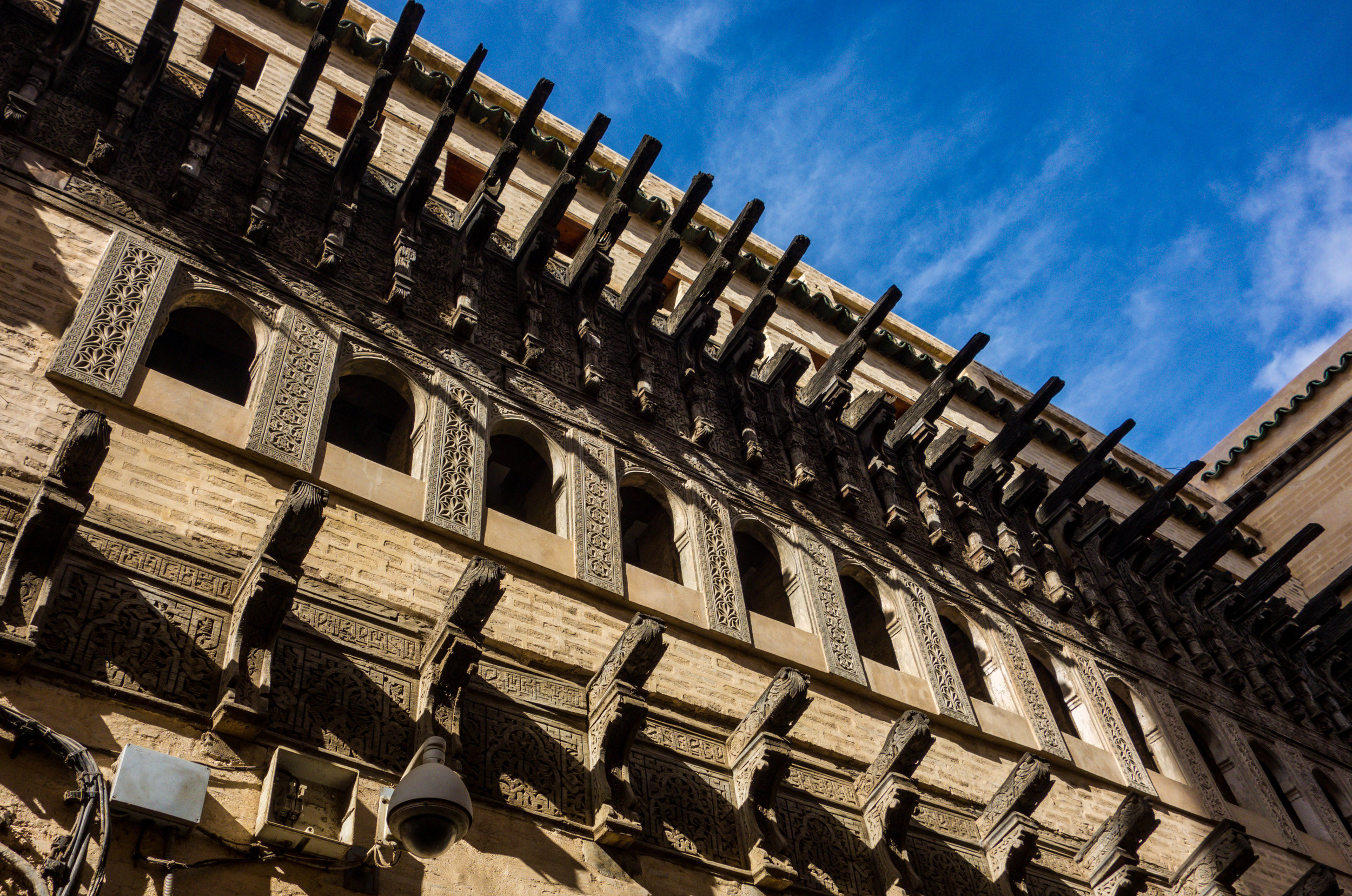
Remains of the hydraulic clock on the facade of the Dar al-Magana in Fes

The Dar al-Magana is a house on Tala'a Kebira street in Fes which stands opposite the Bou Inania Madrasa and Mosque. The structure is believed to have also been built by Abu Inan alongside his madrasa complex, with one chronicler (al-Djazna'i) reporting that it was completed on May 6, 1357 (14 Djumada al-awwal, 758 AH). Its street facade features a famous but poorly-understood hydraulic clock, which was overseen by the mosque's muwaqqit (timekeeper). The Bou Inania's clock may have followed similar principles as the earlier water clock built for the Dar al-Muwaqqit of the Qarawiyyin Mosque by Sultan Abu Said in 1317.

=== Other Dar al-Muwaqqits in Morocco ===
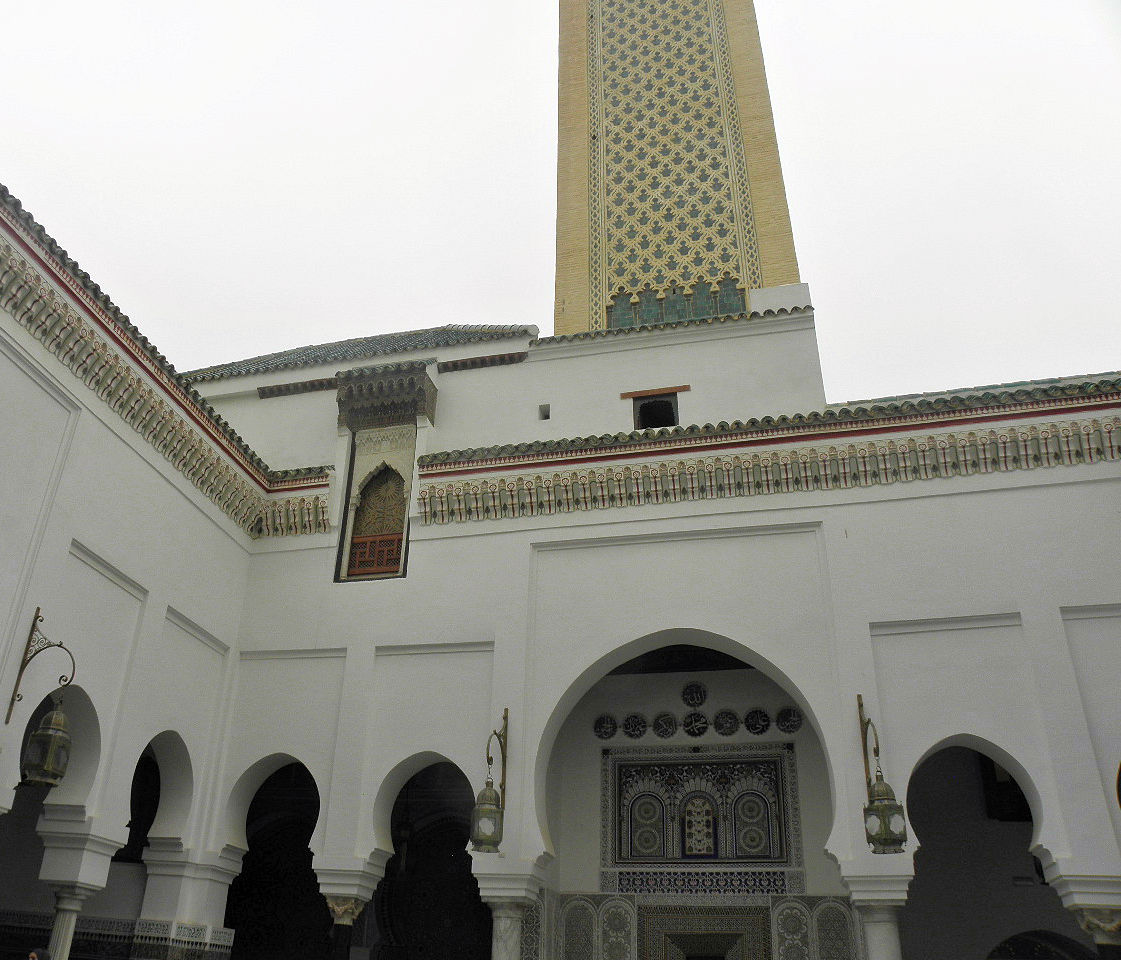
The 18th-century Dar al-Muwaqqit of the Zawiya of Moulay Idris II in Fes, marked by the ornate upper-floor window on the left, next to the minaret

Many mosques in Morocco had a dedicated Dar al-Muwaqqit, especially from the Marinid period onward. Like the one found in the Qarawiyyin Mosque, they were almost always adjoined to the mosque's minaret, often on a second floor above the gallery overlooking the mosque's sahn (courtyard), and marked by an ornate double-arched window. The Dar al-Muwaqqit of the Grand Mosque of Fes el-Jdid, built around 1276, may have been the earliest example of this type of chamber in Marinid architecture, and served as a model for the one built soon after at the Qarawiyyin Mosque. Other later examples include the Dar al-Muwaqqit of the Alaouite-era Lalla Aouda Mosque in Meknes (between 1672 and 1678 under Sultan Moulay Isma'il) and the Dar al-Muwaqqit of the Zawiya of Moulay Idris II in Fes (probably from its expansion by Moulay Isma'il between 1717 and 1720). The Dar al-Muwaqqit of the Zawiya of Moulay Idris II is also notable for featuring marble spolia from the Saadian palaces of Marrakesh (from the Badi Palace or another structure), looted by Sultan Moulay Isma'il.

== The muvakkithane in the Ottoman Empire ==
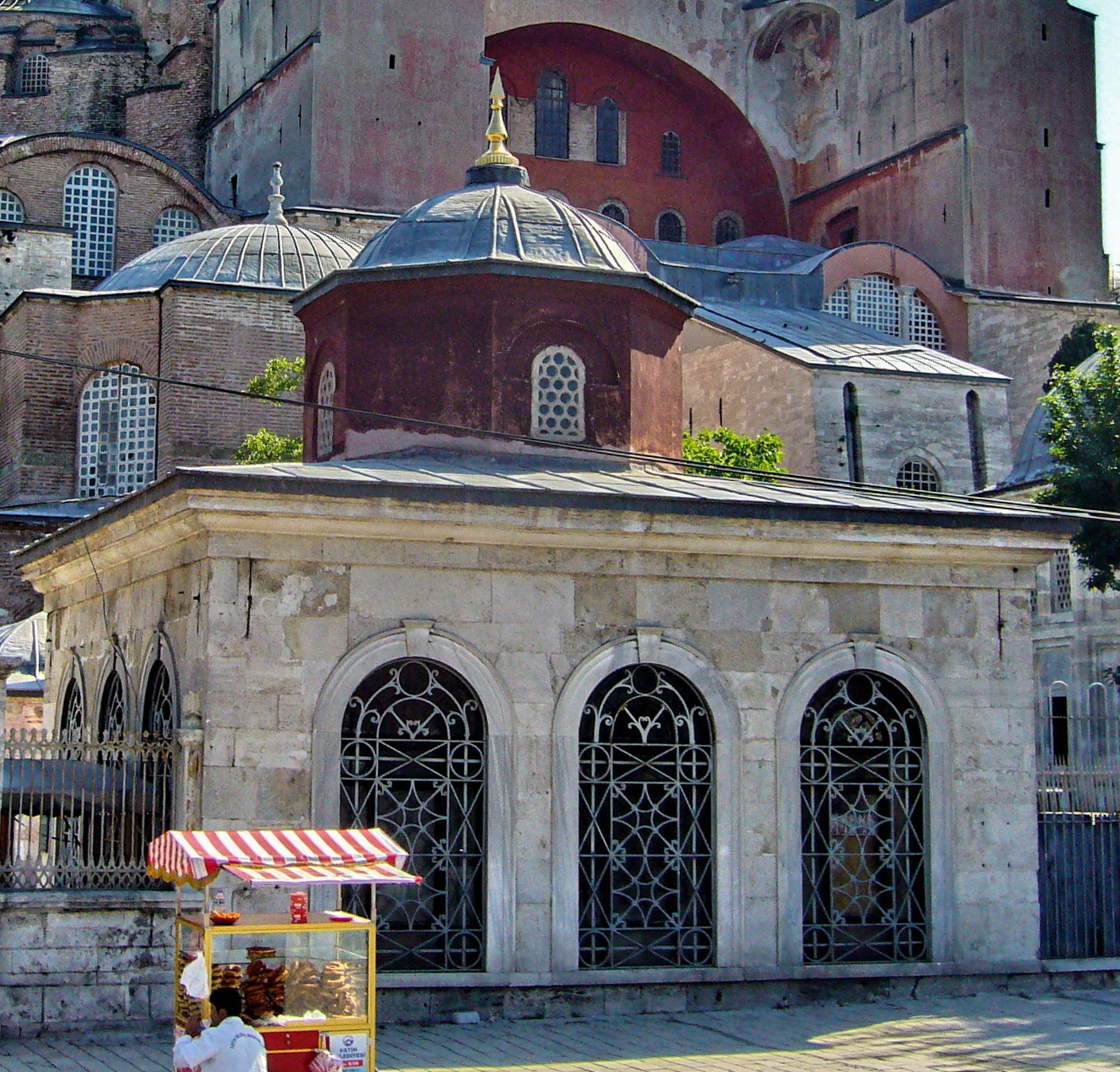
The muvakkithane ("lodge of the muwaqqit") at the Hagia Sophia in Istanbul

The Turkish historian of science Aydın Sayılı noted that many mosques in Istanbul have buildings or rooms called a muvakkithane ("lodge of the muwaqqit"). Ottoman sultans and other notables built and patronized them as acts of piety and philanthropy. Such constructions became more common over time, peaking during the late eighteenth and the nineteenth century. Ottoman astronomers produced prayer timetables in locations previously without them, and in the eighteenth century, the architect Salih Efendi wrote timekeeping tables which were popular among the muwaqqits of the imperial capital.

As the use of mechanical clocks became common during the eighteenth century, the muwaqqits included them as part of their standard tools and many became experts at making and repairing clocks. Ottoman muwaqqits also adapted existing tables to the Ottoman convention of defining 12:00 o'clock at sunset, requiring varying amounts of time shifts each day. Setting one's personal watch according to the clocks at muvakkithanes was a common practice after the spread of personal timepieces in late eighteenth century. Activities of the muwaqqits were also recorded in Syria (especially the Umayyad Mosque) and Egypt up to the nineteenth century.

== See also ==
- Elephant clock of al-Jazari
- Astronomy in the medieval Islamic world

== Bibliography ==
- Brentjes, Sonja (2008). "Shams al-Din al-Sakhawi on Muwaqqits, Mu'adhdhins, and the Teachers of Various Astronomical Disciplines in Mamluk Cities in the Fifteenth Century". In Emilia Calvo; Mercè Comes; Roser Puig; Mònica Rius (eds.). A Shared Legacy: Islamic Science East and West. Edicions Universitat Barcelona. ISBN 978-84-475-3285-8.
- Hadi Bashori, Muhammad (2015). Pengantar Ilmu Falak. Jakarta: Pustaka Al Kautsar. ISBN 978-979-592-701-3.
- King, David A. (1983). "The Astronomy of the Mamluks". Isis. 74 (4): 531–555. doi:10.1086/353360. JSTOR 232211. S2CID 144315162.
- King, David A. (1993). "Mīḳāt: Astronomical aspects". In Bosworth, C. E.; van Donzel, E.; Heinrichs, W. P. & Pellat, Ch. (eds.). The Encyclopaedia of Islam, Second Edition. Volume VII: Mif–Naz. Leiden: E. J. Brill. pp. 27–32. ISBN 978-90-04-09419-2.
- King, David A. (1996). "On the role of the muezzin and the muwaqqit in medieval Islamic society". In E. Jamil Ragep; Sally P. Ragep (eds.). Tradition, Transmission, Transformation. E.J. Brill. pp. 285–345. ISBN 90-04-10119-5.
- King, David A. (1998). "Mamluk astronomy and the institution of the muwaqqit". In Thomas Philipp; Ulrich Haarman (eds.). The Mamluks in Egyptian Politics and Society. Cambridge University Press. pp. 153–162. ISBN 978-0-521-59115-7.
- Wensinck, Arent Jan (1993). "Mīḳāt: Legal aspects". In Bosworth, C. E.; van Donzel, E.; Heinrichs, W. P. & Pellat, Ch. (eds.). The Encyclopaedia of Islam, Second Edition. Volume VII: Mif–Naz. Leiden: E. J. Brill. pp. 26–27. ISBN 978-90-04-09419-2.
- Wishnitzer, Avner (2015). Reading Clocks, Alla Turca: Time and Society in the Late Ottoman Empire. University of Chicago Press. ISBN 978-0-226-25772-3.
