= Borj Neffara =

Tower in Morocco

Borj (an-)Neffara
- برج النفارة
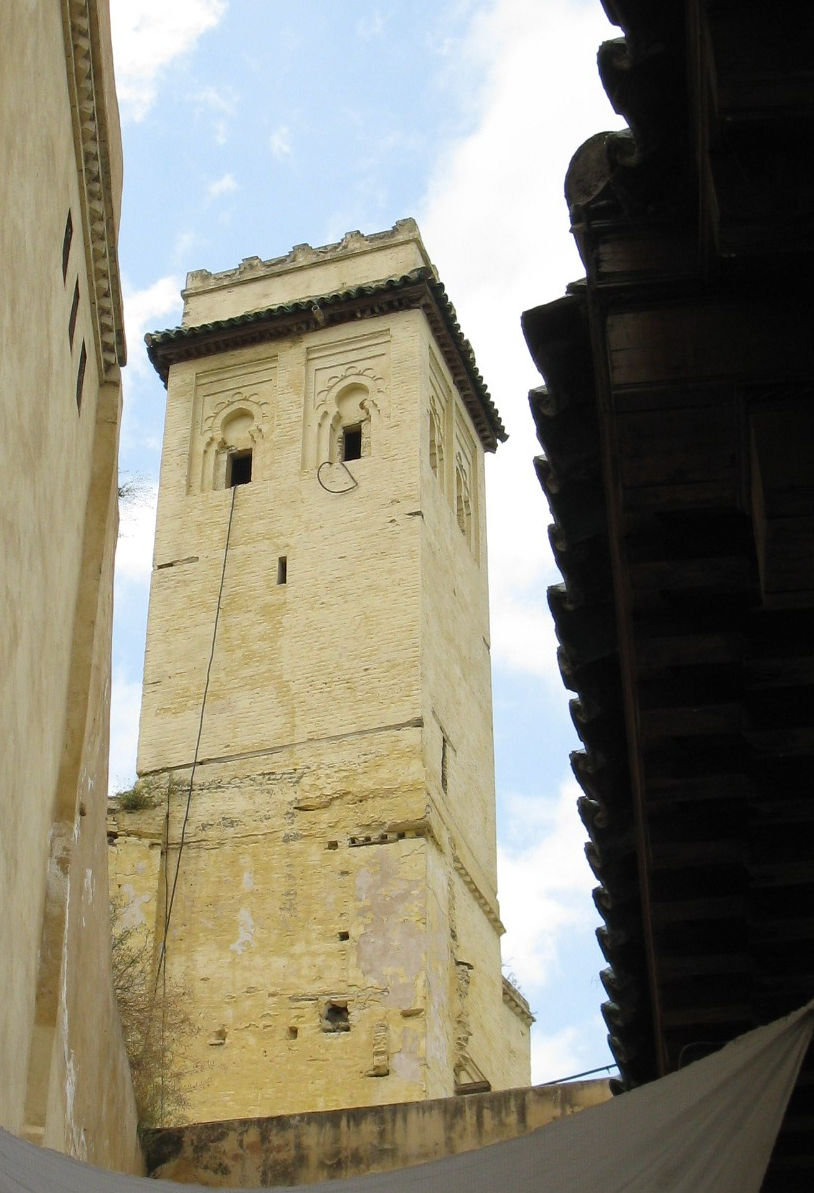
- The Borj Neffara, seen from the street next to the Qarawiyyin Mosque.
- Interactive map of the Borj (an-)Neffara area

General information
- Type: observation tower
- Architectural style: Marinid, Moroccan
- Location: Fez, Morocco
- Coordinates: 34°03′53.3″N 4°58′26″W
- Completed: mid-14th century

Technical details
- Material: brick

The Borj Neffara (Arabic: برج النفارة , "Tower of the Trumpeters") is a historic observation tower and landmark near the Qarawiyyin Mosque in Fes el-Bali, the old city of Fes, Morocco. It is also referred to as the Dar al-Muwaqqit (not to be confused with another Dar al-Muwaqqit inside the nearby Qarawiyyin Mosque and in other mosques).

== Description ==
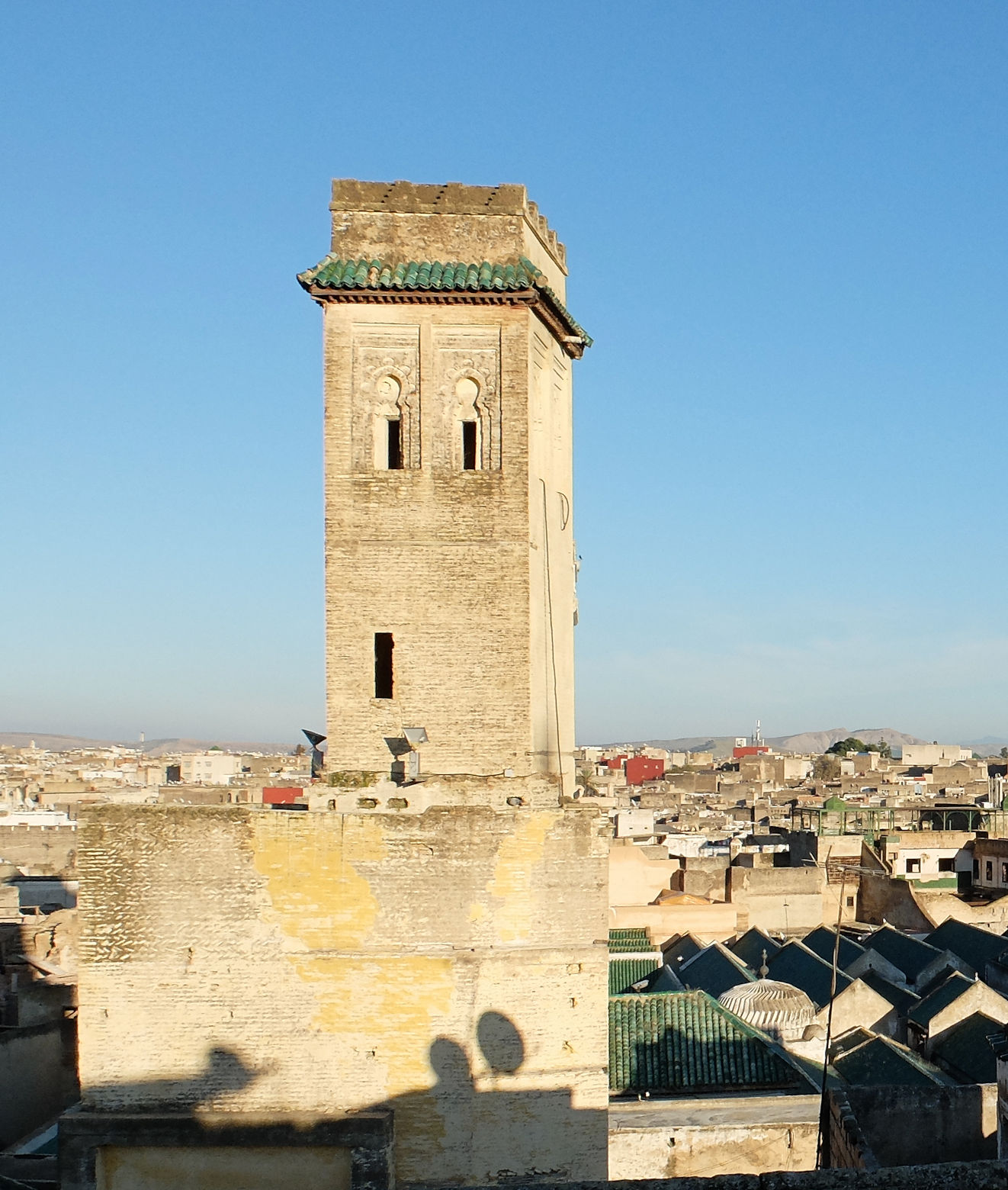
The Borj Neffara seen from nearby rooftops.

The construction of the tower is attributed to the Marinid sultan Abu Inan in the mid-14th century. The tower is often mistaken for a minaret, but is architecturally distinguished from a minaret in part by the lack of a lantern structure (a kind of mini-tower) at its top (though the nearby minaret of the Qarawiyyin Mosque also lacks this). The tower is part of a slightly larger structure called the Dar al-Muwaqqit ("House of the Timekeeper"), a term also used for the room or residence of the timekeeper (muwaqqit) in various mosques. The structure here consists of a house with two floors arranged around a central courtyard, with the tower rising on the house's southern side.

The tower is reported to have served several functions, but the principal function appears to have been as a platform for astronomical observation carried out by a muwaqqit (timekeeper). Many mosques already had a muwaqqit who was responsible for establishing the times of prayers and other time-related functions. This tower was meant to assist in determining the accurate beginning of the months (including Ramadan) in the Islamic lunar calendar, something for which astronomical observation was crucial. The muwaqqit himself presumably lived and/or worked in the adjoining house.

The tower reportedly also doubled as a fire lookout tower. The tower's name, meaning "Tower of the Trumpeters", is a reference to the fact that during the fasting month of Ramadan, trumpeters would climb the tower and wake the people of the city just before dawn so that they could take their last meal (suhur) before the fasting period during the day.
