= Februniye Akyol =

Turkish politician

- Fabronia Benno

Co-mayor of Mardin
- In office 2014–2016
- Co-mayor: Ahmet Türk

Personal details
- Born: 1988 (age 37–38) Mardin, Turkey
- Education: Mardin Artuklu University
- Occupation: Politician

Februniye Akyol (Christian name: Fabronia Benno) is a Syriac Christian politician and was co-mayor of Mardin. She is a part of the Syriac Orthodox Church, and thus the first Christian woman to lead one of Turkey's 30 metropolitan municipalities.

== Early life and education ==
Born to a silversmith and baptized as Fabronia Benno she studied the Assyrian language at the Artuklu University in Mardin. While she was still studying at the University pursuing her master's degree, she was asked by politicians of the Peace and Democracy Party (BDP) to become a candidate for the mayorship of Mardin together with the Kurdish politician Ahmet Türk. It was the imprisoned Abdullah Öcalan who suggested that a female Syriac should run for the co-mayorship in Mardin. She first had doubts due to the Kurdish role in the Armenian and Assyrian genocides but Türk, who as one of the first Kurds who apologized to the Armenian and Assyrian communities, eventually compelled her to run.

== Political career ==
Akyol had to run for office with the Turkish name Februniye Akyol, due to long-standing limitations for the cultures and languages of ethnic and religious minorities in Turkey. Syriac Christians are not recognized as a Turkish religious minority, nor are they permitted to teach the Syriac language. Put forward as a candidate by the BDP two months before the elections, she was elected co-mayor in the municipal elections on the 30 March 2014. The BDP splits all top posts between a man and a woman to boost female participation in politics. On the 17 November 2016 she and Ahmet Türk were dismissed as the Co-Mayors of Mardin.
