= Mardin Castle =

Castle in Mardin, Turkey

- Mardin in Turkey
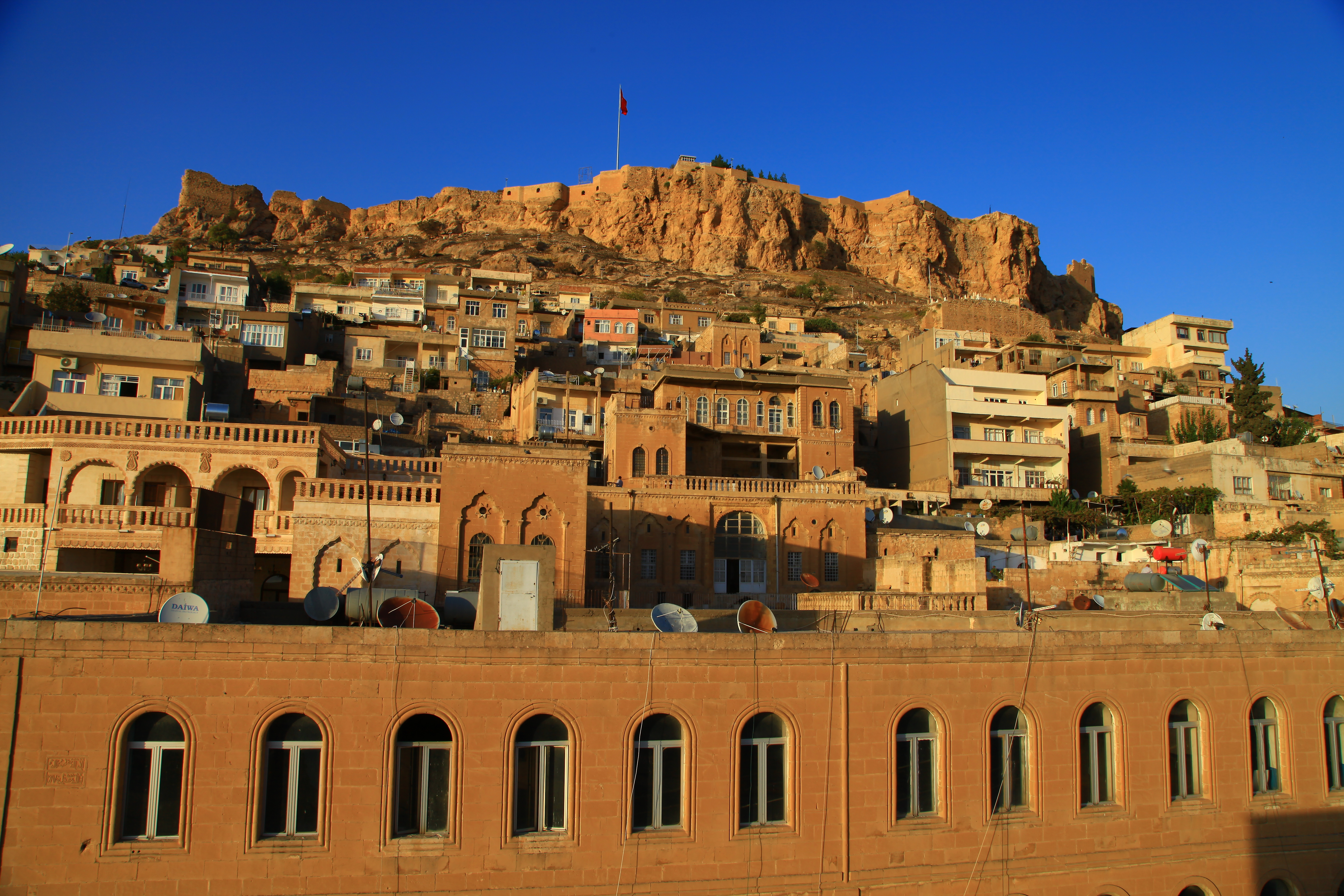
- Mardin, with the castle above

Location
- Coordinates: 37°18′55.9″N 40°44′32.9″E

Mardin Castle is a 3,000 year old defensive fortification in the city of Mardin, Turkey. It is known as the Eagle's Nest. The castle has been used as a military base as part of a NATO agreement and hosts a radar station due to its position 1,000 meters above the Mesopotamian plain.

One legend states that the castle was constructed in the 4th century BC by a Babylonian Zoroastrian called Shad Buhari, who "recovered from a serious illness while staying up on the hill, and so he decided to erect a palace there".

The castle was constructed during the 10th century rule of the Hamdanid dynasty to the Artuqid dynasty from the 11th to 13th century. The castle was partly restored during the reign of Ottoman Sultan Selim III, but by the end of the Ottoman Empire had again fallen into disrepair.

During the Armenian genocide, Mardin Castle served as a prison and holding place for Orthodox and Catholic Armenians prior to their execution.

More recently, works were carried out to strengthen the castle structure and prevent loose rocks falling down onto the city. The castle has seen numerous attempts to open it to tourism which have often been blocked by bureaucratic obstacles.In 2014, Mardin Deputy Governor Ali Güldoğan told Hurriyet that the civilian administration "had applied many times since 2008 for the military unit to leave the castle and open it to tourism".

In June, 2015, former Mardin co-mayor Ahmet Türk of the People's Democratic Party "initiated a campaign in collaboration with non-governmental organizations with the slogan “Mardin Castle belongs to the people of Mardin” and demanded the castle to be open to visitors", according to Hurriyet.

In 2017, the Justice and Development Party deputy Orhan Miroğlu suggested that the site could be opened to tourism. As of 2021 the castle remains a military base, but it is possible to walk almost to the top to see views of the city.
