= Kasımiye Medrese =

Madrasa in Mardin, Turkey

Kasımiye Medrese Turkish: Kasımiye Medresesi
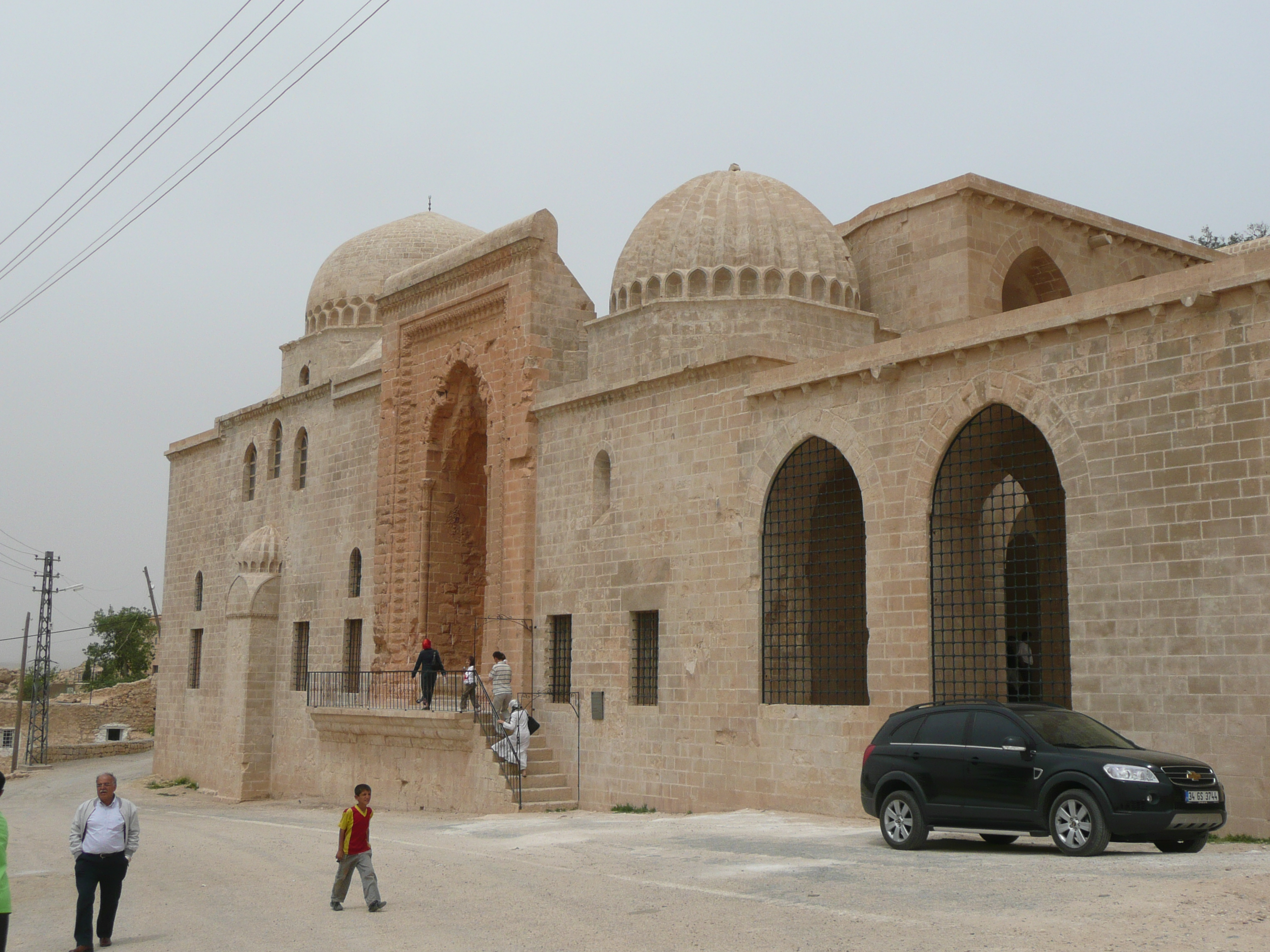

Location
- Mardin; Turkey
- Coordinates: 37°18′29″N 40°43′12″E

Information
- Type: madrasa
- Religious affiliation(s): Islam

The Kasımiye Medrese (Turkish: Kasımiye Medresesi) or Kasim Pasha Medrese is a former madrasa (Turkish: medrese) in Mardin, Turkey.

== Geography ==
The medrese is located southwest of the city centre of old Mardin. The altitude of the Kasımiye is about 975 metres (3,199 ft).

== History ==
The medrese was begun sultan Al-Zahir Majd al-Din 'Isā ibn Dāwūd (or İsa Bey) of the Artuqid dynasty, rulers of an Anatolian beylik. However, he was killed in a battle against the Karakoyunlu in 1407, before the building was fully constructed. The construction was resumed after the city fell to the Akkoyunlu Turkmens. Kasım, a son of Akkoyunlu sultan Mu'izz-al-Din, is credited with completing the medrese in 1445.

In 1924, all medreses in Turkey were closed down within a general attack on religious life and a top-down attempt to secularise society.

== The building ==
The main building is rectangular. The entrance through an ornamented portal is from the south. In the courtyard there is a pool. The water source is a funnel in the wall that represents birth. The water from the pool drains through a narrow slit that represents death and sırat (in Islamic belief a narrow bridge on hell which leads to paradise) . The classrooms surround the pool. The classroom doors are kept deliberately low to ensure students would bow reverently before their teachers as they entered.

== Elephant clock ==
On the north of the iwan there is the reproduction of an elephant clock designed by al-Jazari, a 12th-century Muslim engineer.
