= Mardin =

Metropolitan municipality in Turkey

- Metropolitan municipality
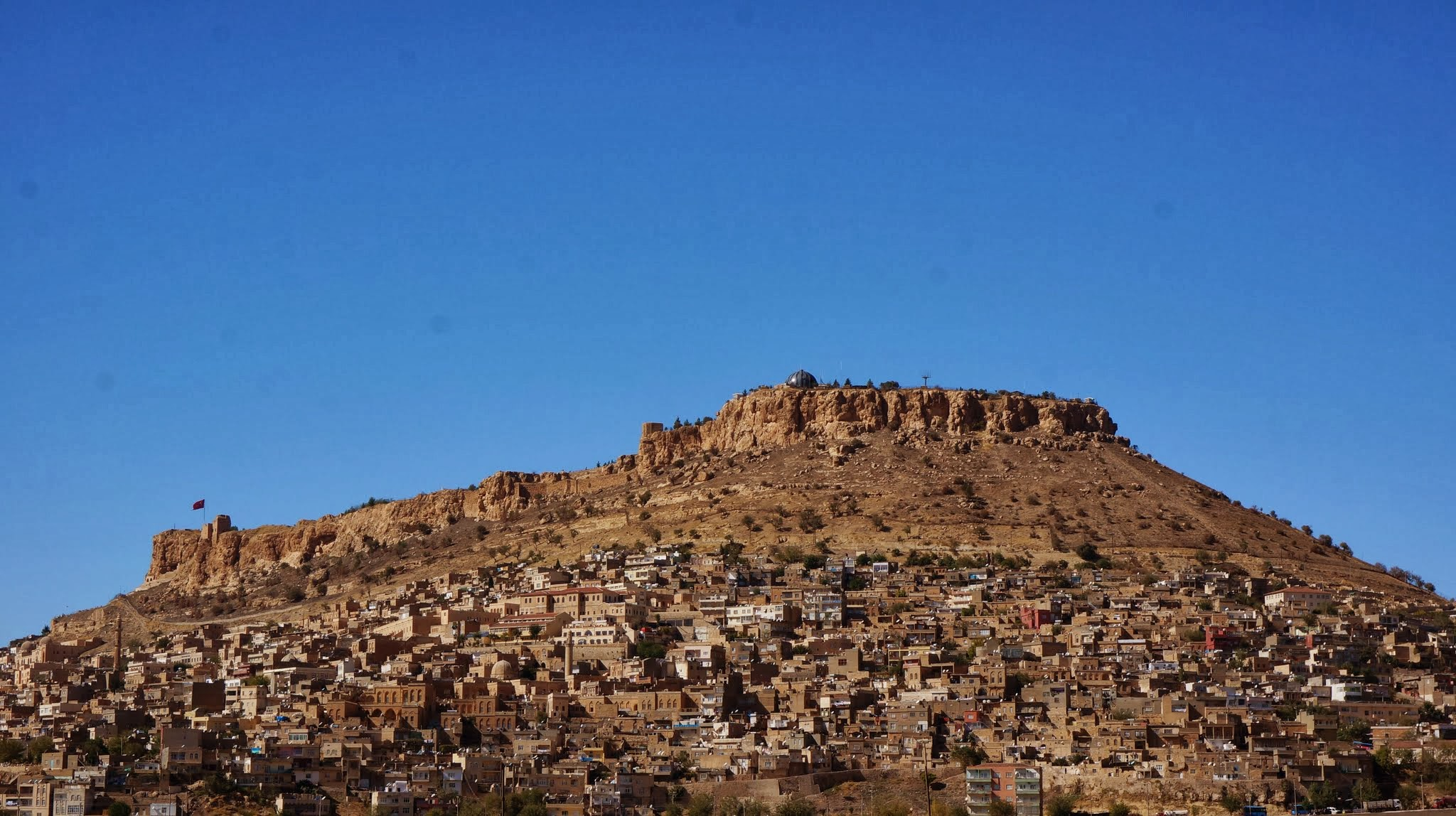
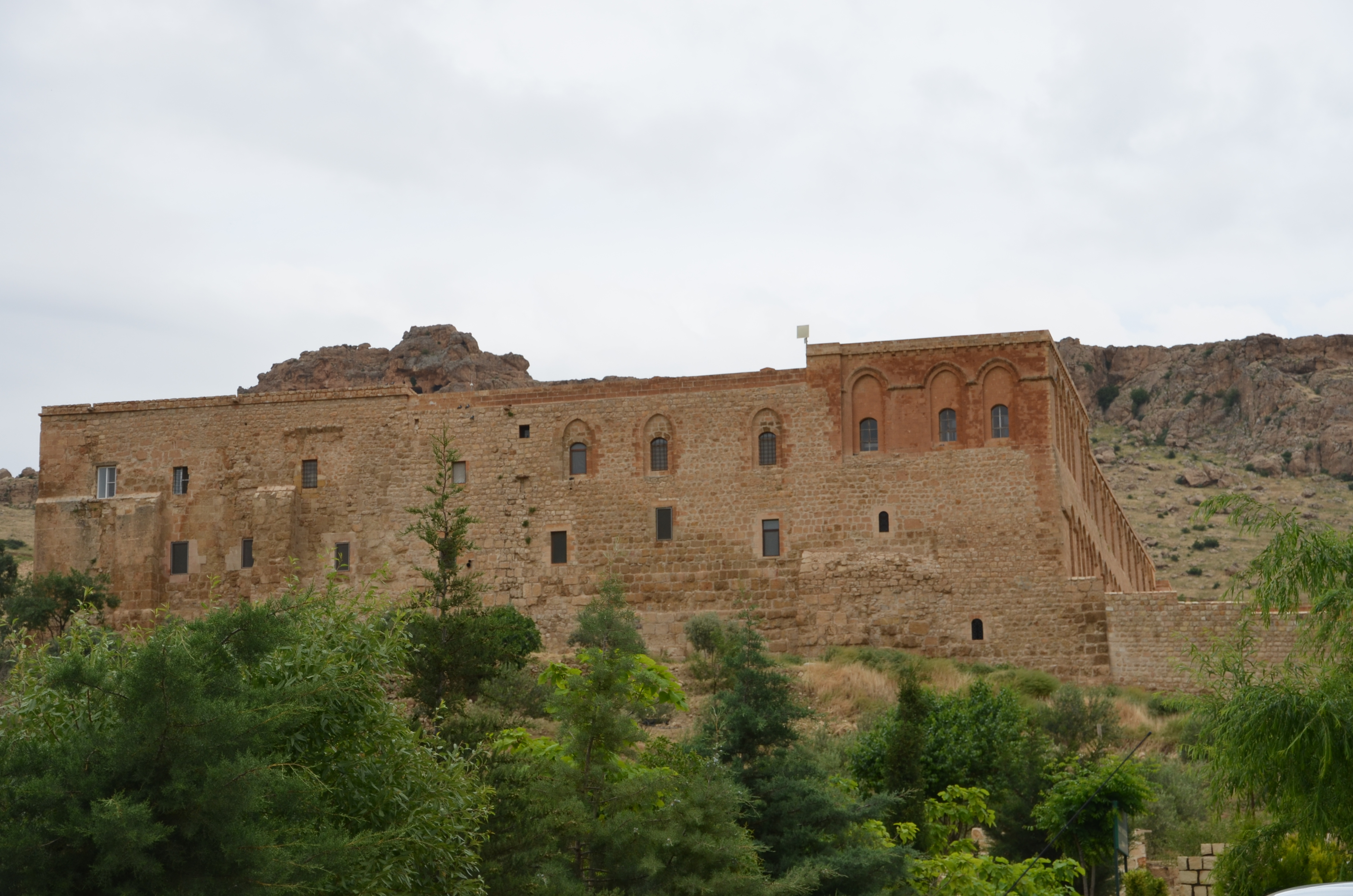
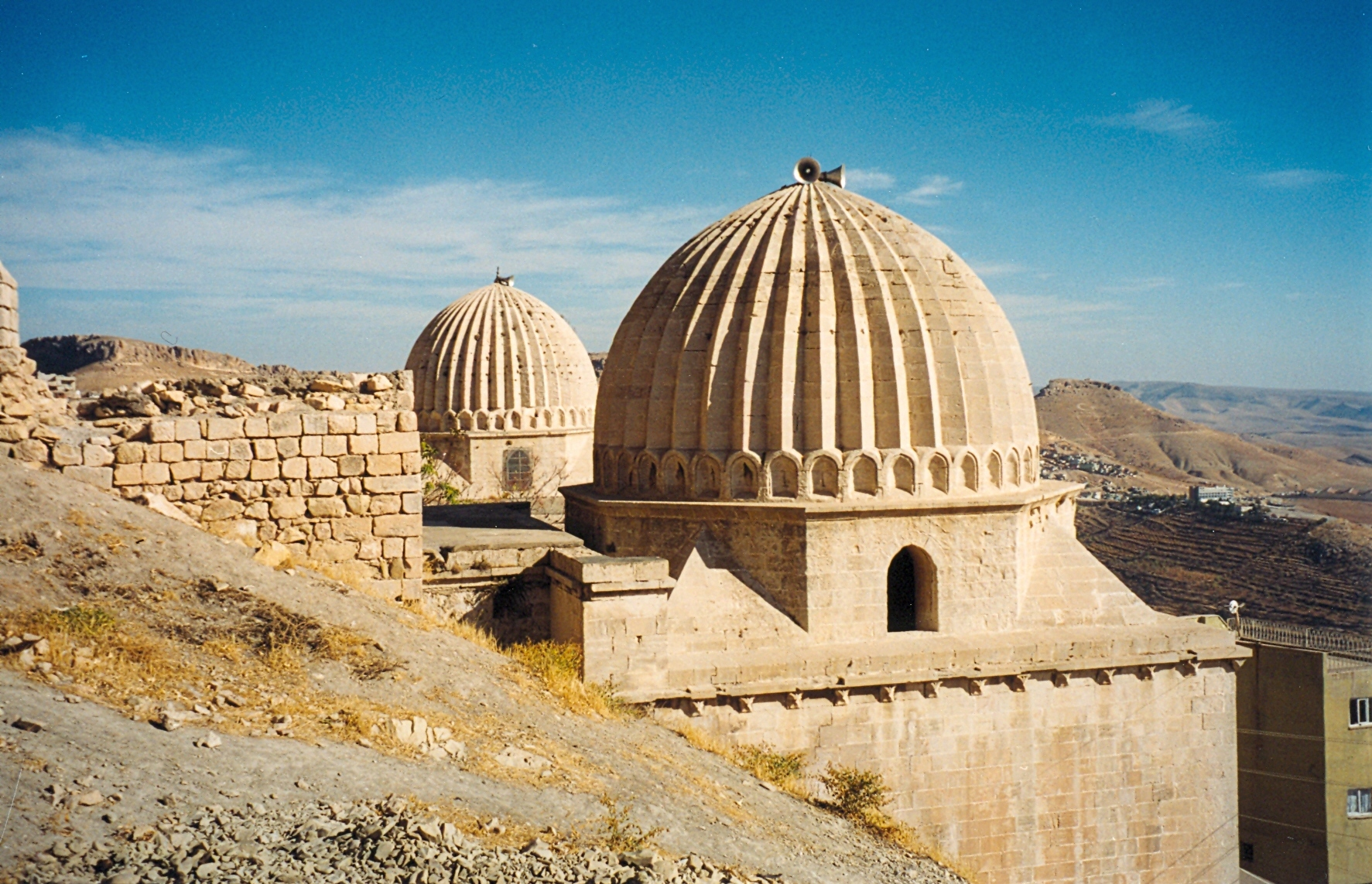
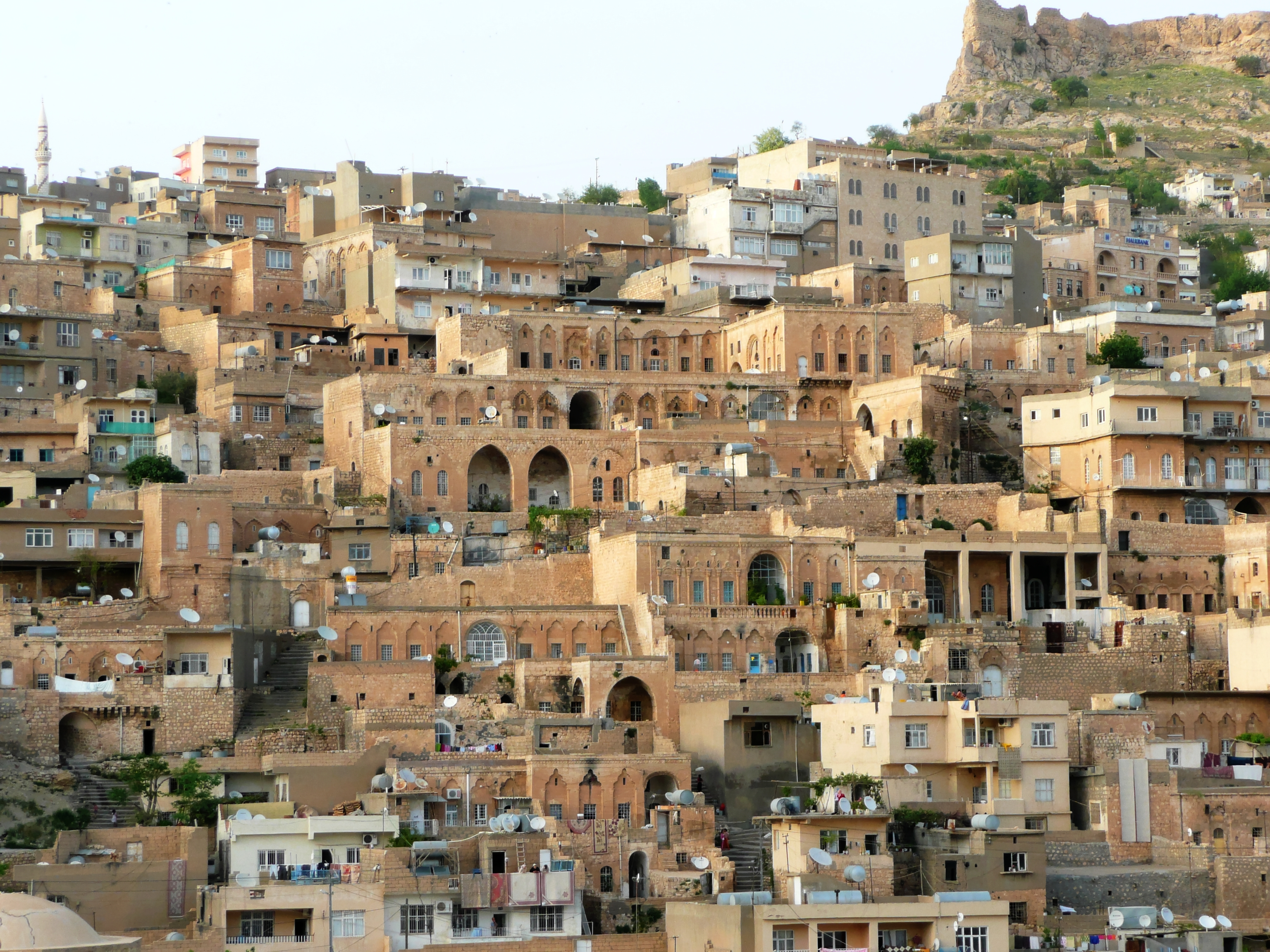
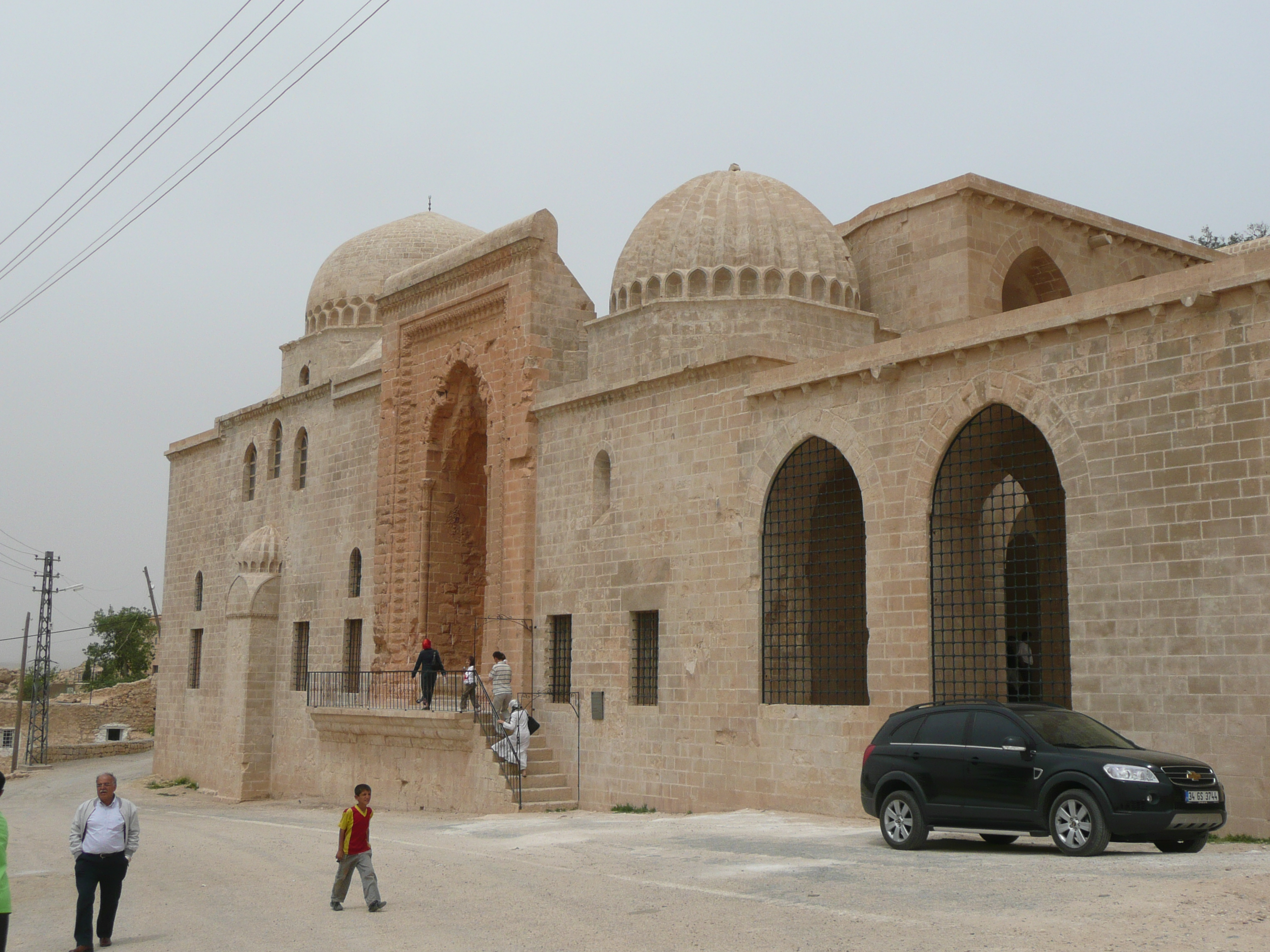
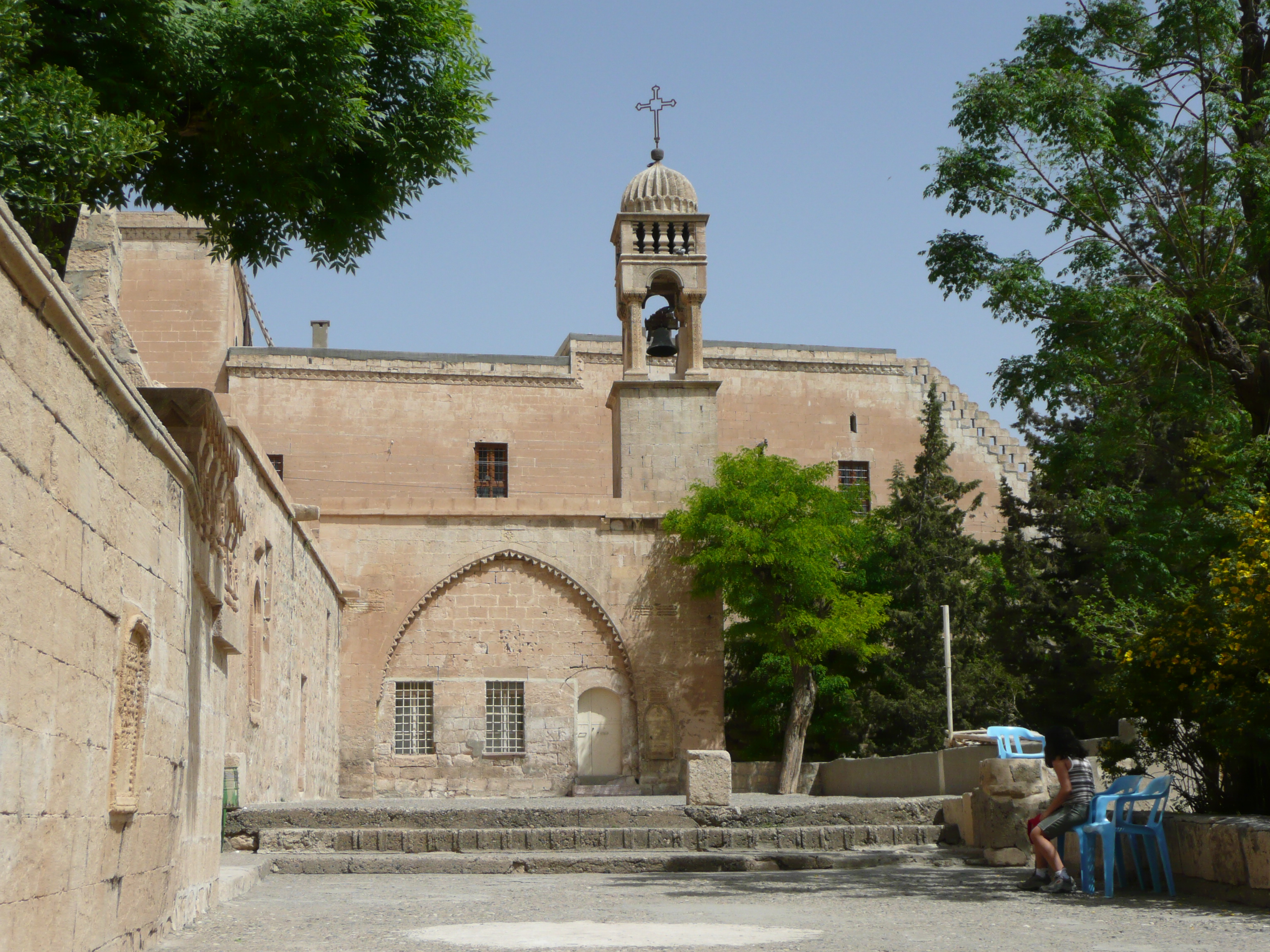
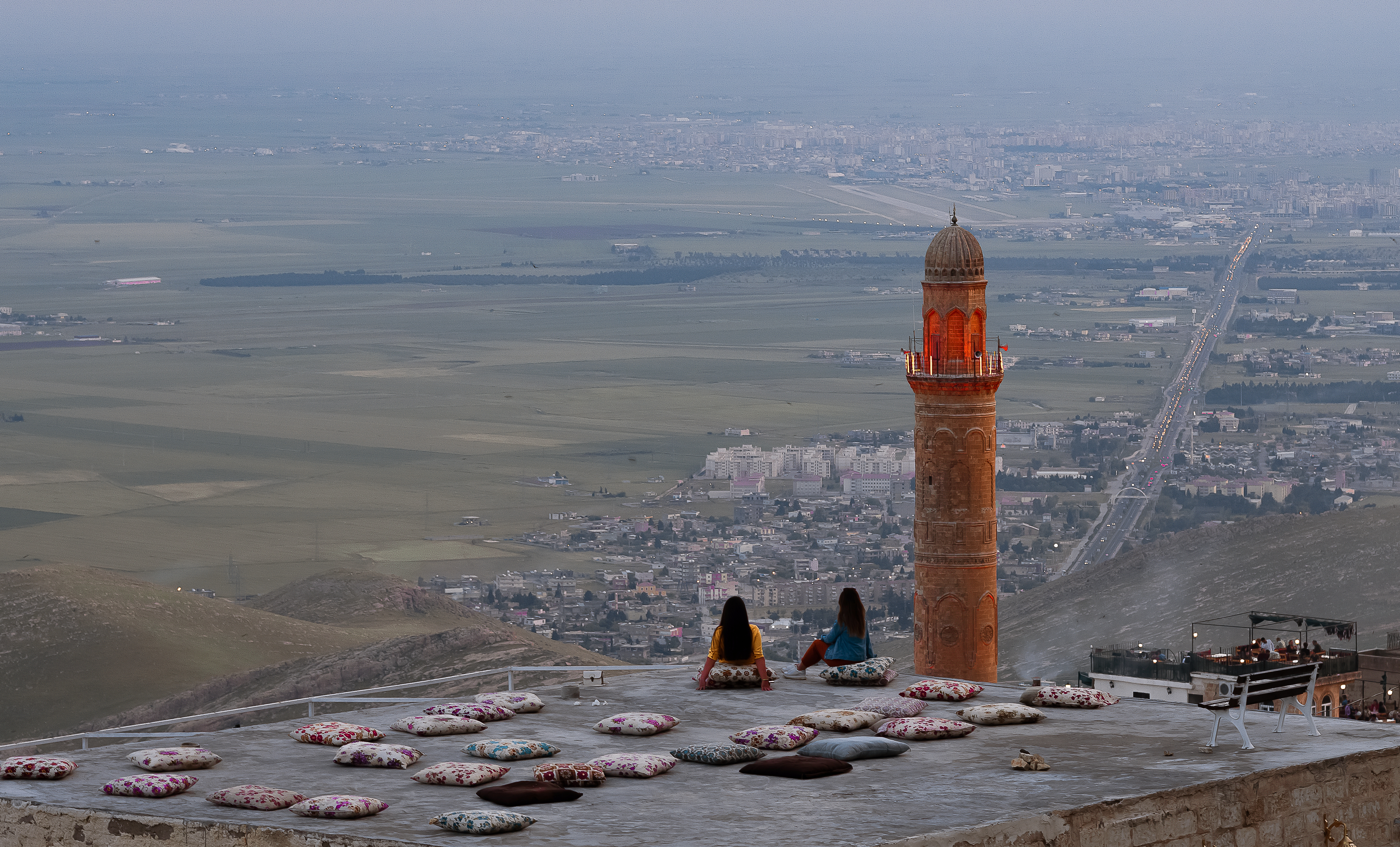
- Clockwise from top: view of the old city and citadel; Sultan Isa Medrese; Kasımiye Medrese; view from the top of the Mesopotamian plain from the city; Mor Behnam Church; houses of the old city; Mor Hananyo Monastery

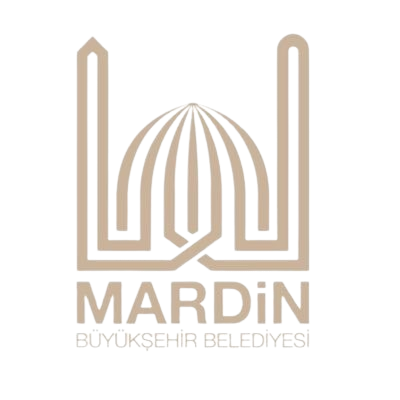
- Emblem of Mardin Metropolitan Municipality

- Location within Turkey
- Coordinates: 37°18′47″N 40°44′06″E
- Country: Turkey
- Province: Mardin

Government
  - Mayor: Tuncay Akkoyun (acting)

Population (2021)
  - Total: 129,864
- Time zone: UTC+3:00 (Time in Turkey)
- Website: www.mardin.gov.tr

Mardin (Kurdish: مێردین, romanized: Mêrdîn; Arabic: ماردين, romanized: Mārdīn; Syriac: ܡܪܕܝܢ, romanized: Mardīn; Armenian: Մարդին) is a city and seat of the Artuklu District of Mardin Province in Turkey. It is known for the Artuqid architecture of its old city, and for its strategic location on a rocky hill near the Tigris River.

In February 2000, the Turkish Ministry of Culture placed Mardin and its surrounding cultural landscape on the country’s Tentative List for UNESCO World Heritage nomination.

The city had a population of 129,864 in 2021. The population is a mix of Kurds, Arabs, Mhallami, and Assyrians.

== History ==
=== Antiquity and etymology ===
A legal document from the Neo-Assyrian period mentions a road to Mardiānê (commonly identified with modern Mardin), showing that the name was already in use at that time. Adad-nirari II campaigned just south of Mardin, and the Arameans offered strong resistance. As Aramean settlement increased in and around the city, the older Akkadian name Mardiānê was dropped and fell out of use, giving rise to the Aramaic name Mardin.

The city survived into the Syriac Christian period as the name of Mount Izla on which in the early 4th century stood the monastery of Nisibis, housing seventy monks. In the Roman period, the city itself was known as Marida (Merida), from a Syriac word translating to "fortress".

Between c. 150 BC and c. AD 250, it was part of Osroene, which was ruled by the Abgarid dynasty.

=== Medieval history ===
During the early Muslim conquests, the Byzantine city was captured in 640 by the Muslim commander Iyad ibn Ghanm. In many periods control of the city changed hands frequently between different dynasties. Hamdan ibn Hamdun captured the city in 885 and it remained under intermittent Hamdanid control until the second half of the 10th century, at which point it became contested between the Marwanids and the Uqaylids, with the Marwanids probably holding the upper hand over this area. Marwanid control in the region was ended by the arrival of the Great Seljuks under Malik-Shah I in 1085, which inaugurated an era of Turkish political domination and immigration in the region.

From 1103 onwards, Mardin served as the capital of one of the two main branches of the Artuqid dynasty, an Oghuz Turkish family who had earlier fought alongside the Seljuks. Many of Mardin's major historic buildings were constructed under Artuqid control, including several mosques and madrasas, along with other types of Islamic architecture. The lands of the Artukid dynasty fell to the Mongol invasion sometime between 1235 and 1243, but the Artuqids submitted to Mongol khan Hülegü and continued to govern as vassals of the Mongol Empire.

Hayton of Corycus's 1307 chronicle notes that, unlike the rest of Mesopotamia's population, Kurds who dwelled in Mardin were skilled archers, while the geographer al-'Umari, writing a few decades later (1340s), likewise confirms a Kurdish presence in al-Jazira and Mardin.

When Timur invaded the region in 1394, the local Artuqid ruler, 'Isā, submitted to Timurid suzerainty, but the region continued to be disputed between different powers. The last Artuqid ruler, al-Salih, finally yielded the city to Qara Yusuf, the leader of Qara Qoyunlu, in 1408–9, and left for Mosul. The city continued to be contested between the Qara Qoyunlu and their rivals, the Timurid-allied Aq Qoyunlu. In 1451 the Qara Qoyunlu besieged the city after it had been captured by the Aq Qoyunlu, but failed to retake the stronghold. Aq Qoyunlu rule thus continued in the city for the rest of the 15th century. Coins were struck here under the rule of Uzun Hasan and his son, Ya'qub. After Ya'qub, Aq Qoyunlu rule began to fragment, but Mardin remained the center of an independent Aq Qoyunlu principality for many years, while the Safavids in the east grew stronger. In 1507, the Safavid ruler Ismail I succeeded in capturing the city and the castle, expelling the local Aq Qoyunlu ruler.

During the medieval period, the town retained significant Syriac and Armenian populations and became the centre for episcopal sees of Armenian Apostolic, Armenian Catholic, Church of the East, Syriac Catholic, churches, as well as a stronghold of the Syriac Orthodox Church, whose patriarchal see was headquartered in the nearby Saffron Monastery from 1034 to 1924. A Venetian merchant who visited the town in 1507 wrote that there were still more Christian Armenians and Jews in the city than Muslims.

=== Ottoman Empire ===
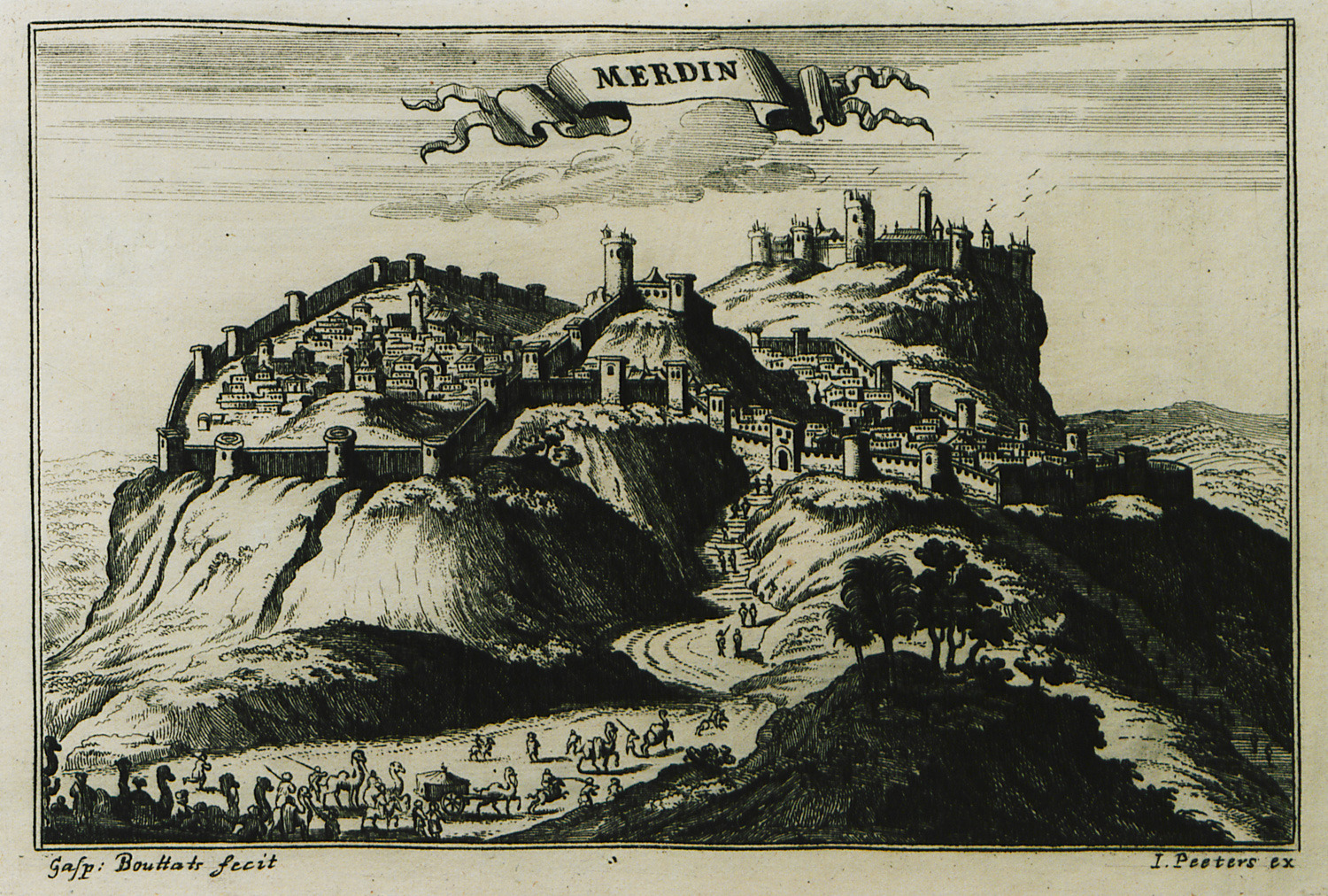
Engraving of Mardin by Jacob Peeters (Flemish traveler) in 1690

After the Ottoman victory against their bitter rivals, the Safavids, at the Battle of Chaldiran in 1514, the balance of power in the region changed. The Safavid commander in the region, Ustajlu, was killed in the battle with the Ottomans and was replaced by his brother, Kara Khan (or Karahan). In 1515 Mardin briefly yielded to the Ottomans, but the castle remained under Safavid control and the Ottomans were forced to leave after a few days, leaving Kara Khan to re-occupy it. The following year, the Ottoman commander, Bıyıklı Mehmed Pasha, defeated Kara Khan and Safavid control in the region crumbled. The Ottomans besieged Mardin again, which resisted under the command of Kara Khan's brother, Sulayman Khan. After the Battle of Marj Dabiq in August 1516, Bıyıklı Mehmed Pasha returned with reinforcements from Syria and finally forced the city's surrender in late 1516 or early 1517. After this, Mardin was administered by a governor directly appointed under the Ottoman Sultan's authority.

The city experienced a relatively tranquil period under Ottoman rule, without any significant conflicts or plights. European travelers who visited the city in the late 18th and early 19th centuries gave highly variable estimates of the population, but generally indicate that Muslims (or "Turks") were the largest group, with sizeable Armenian and Syriac communities and other minorities, while Arabic and Kurdish were the predominant languages.

The period of peace was finally halted when the Ottoman Empire came into conflict with the Khedivate of Egypt. During this time the city came under the rule of insurgents associated with the Kurdish Milli clan. In 1835, the Milli tribe was subdued by the military troops of the Wāli of Diyarbekir Eyalet, Reşid Mehmed Pasha. During the siege the city's Great Mosque was blown up. Between 1847 and 1865 the city's population suffered from a notable cholera epidemic, with the exact number of fatalities not known. During World War I Mardin was one of the sites of the Syriac and Armenian genocides. On the eve of World War I, Mardin was home to over 12,000 Syriacs and over 7,500 Armenians. During the course of the war, many were sent to the Ras al-'Ayn Camps, though some managed to escape to the Sinjar Mountain with help from local Chechens. Kurds and Arabs of Mardin typically refer to these events as "fırman" (government order), while the Syriac Christians call it "Seyfo" (sword). After the Armistice of Mudros Mardin was one of the Turkish cities that was not occupied by the troops of the Allied Powers.

=== Modern history ===
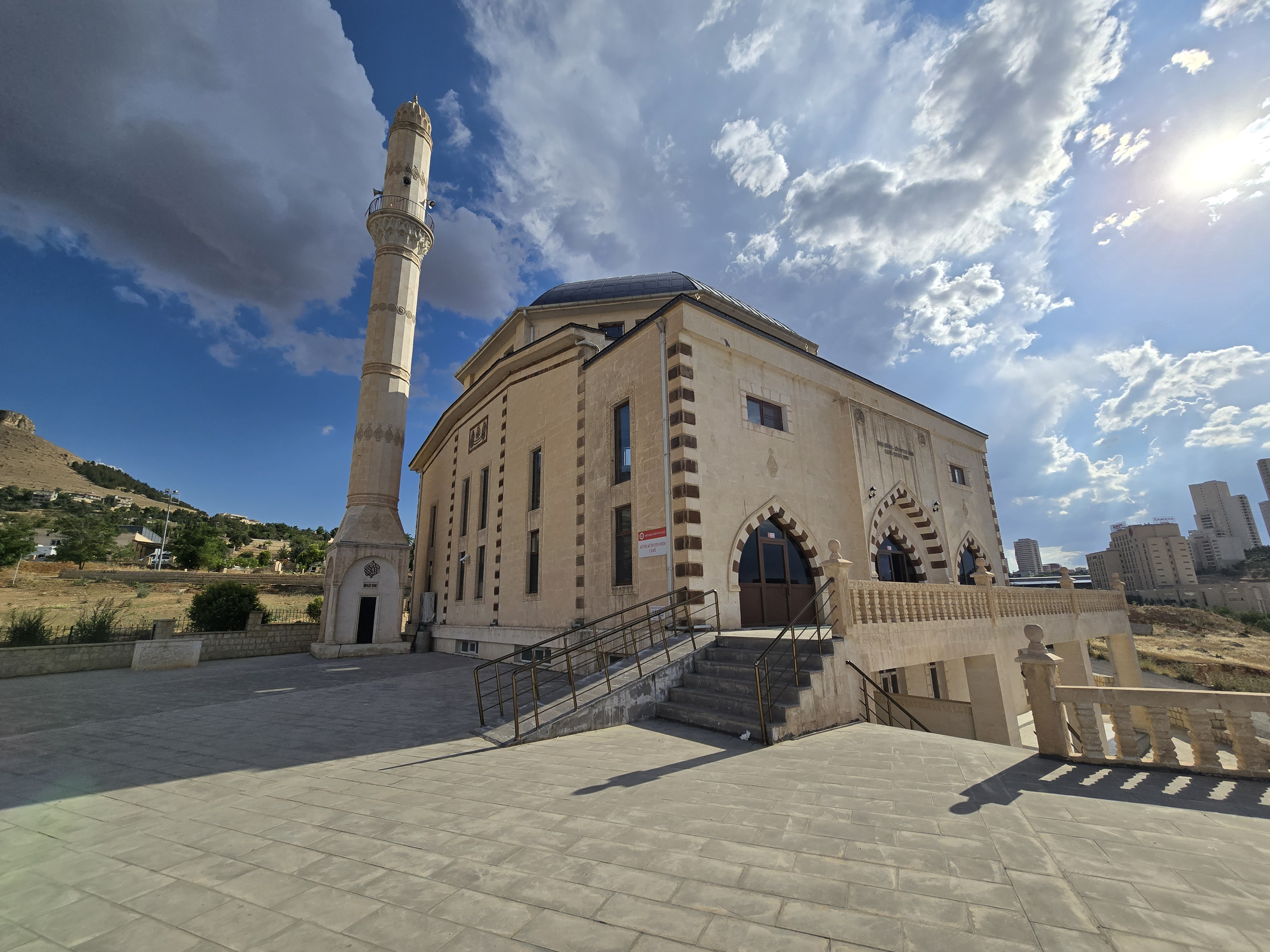
Münir Müzeyyen Dede Mosque in Artuklu District

In 1923, with the founding of the Republic of Turkey, Mardin was made the administrative capital of a province named after it. Many Syriac Christian survivors of the violence, later on, left Mardin for nearby Qamishli in the 1940s after their conscription in the Turkish Army became compulsory. As the Turkish Government subdued the Kurdish Sheikh Said rebellion in 1925, the first and the fourteenth cavalry division were stationed in Mardin.

Mardin industrialized significantly during the 1990s, when inhabitants moved in greater numbers to the modern parts of the city that were developing on lower ground at the foot of the old city hill. Through a passed law in 2012 Mardin became a metropolitan municipality, which took office after the Turkish local elections in 2014. The city has a significant Arab population.

== Geography ==
The city is located near the Syrian border and is the center of Mardin province. The old city is built mostly on the southern slope of a long hill topped by a rocky ridge. The slope descends towards the Mesopotamian plain. The top of the ridge is occupied by the city's historic citadel. The newer parts of the city are located on lower ground to the northwest and in the surrounding area and feature modern amenities and institutions. Mardin Airport is located to the southwest, 20 kilometres (12 mi) from the old town.

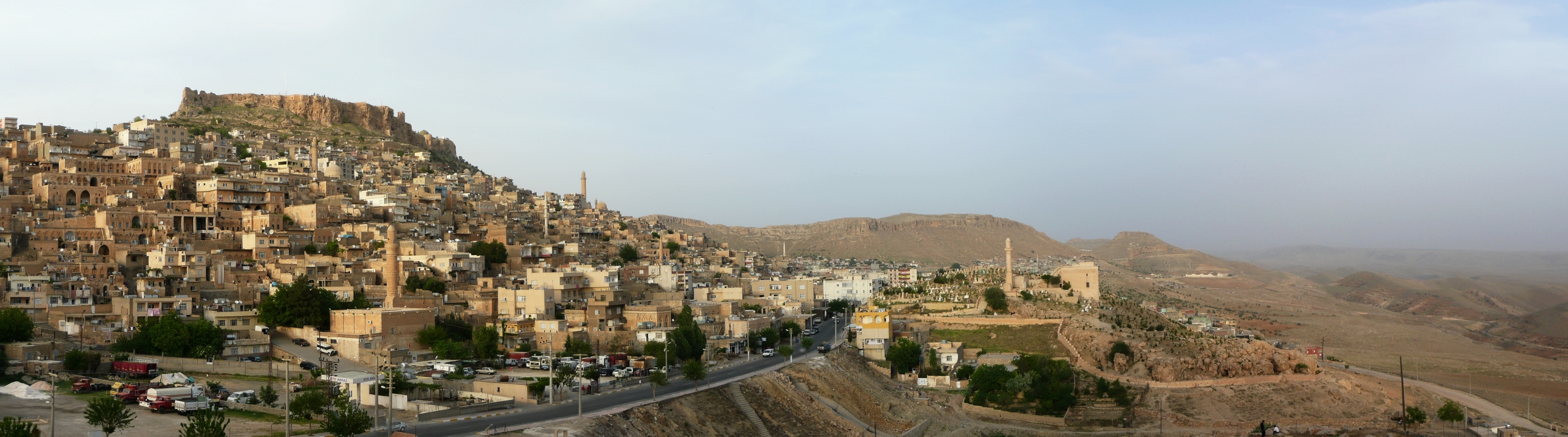
Panorama of the old city of Mardin, with the Mesopotamian Plain opening to the right

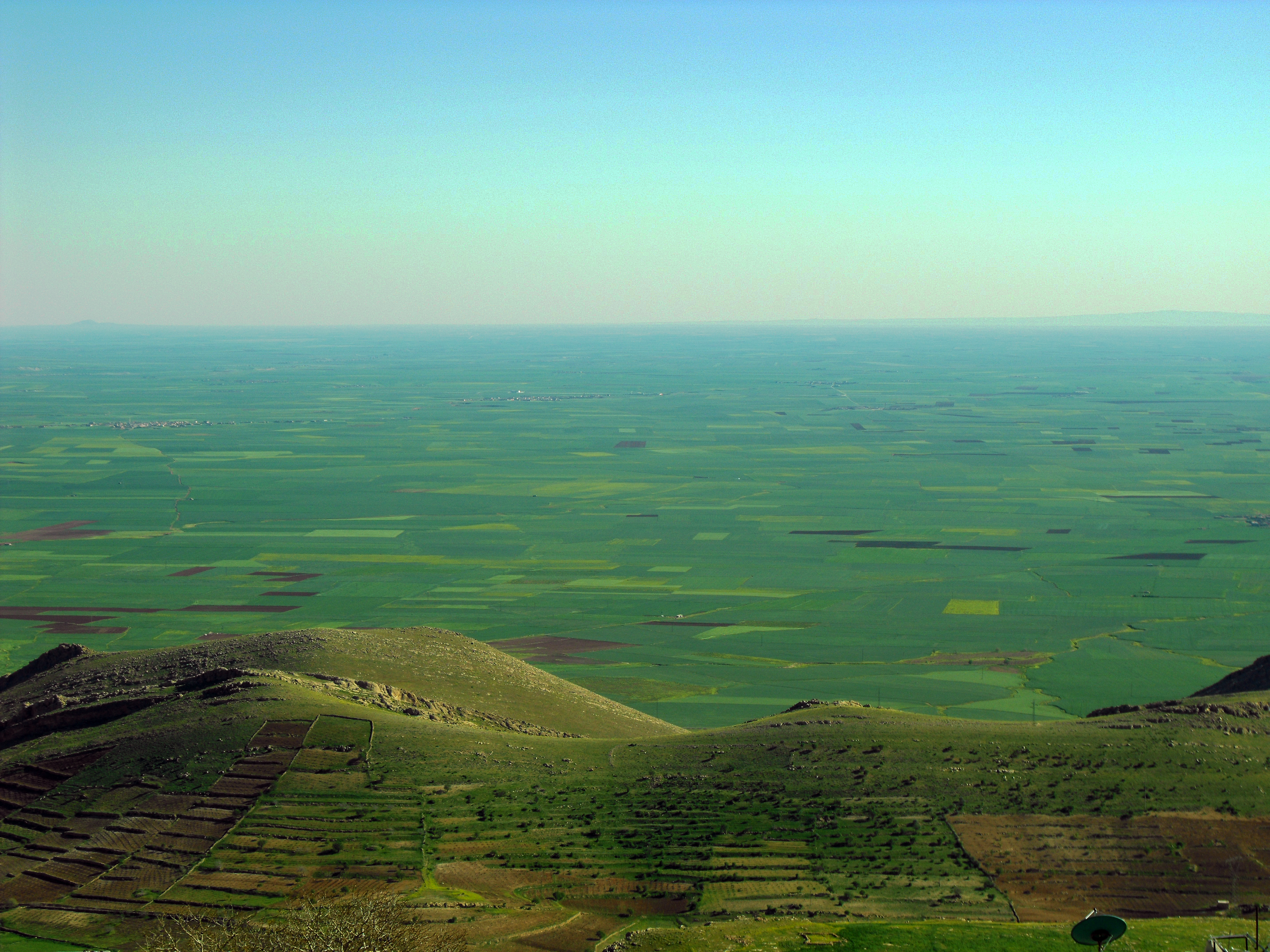
Cultivated plains south of Mardin

=== Neighbourhoods ===
The city is divided into the following neighborhoods: 13. Mart, Cumhuriyet, Çabuk, Diyarbakırkapı, Eminettin, Ensar, Gül, Hamzabey, İstasyon, Kayacan, Kotek, Latifiye, Medrese, Necmettin, Nur, Ofis, Saraçoğlu, Savurkapı, Şar, Şehidiye, Teker, Yalım (Mansuriye), Ulucami, Yenıkapı and Yenişehir.

=== Climate ===
Mardin has a hot-summer Mediterranean climate (Köppen: Csa, Trewartha: Cs) with very hot, dry summers and chilly, wet, and occasionally snowy winters. Mardin is very sunny, with over 3000 hours of sun per year. While temperatures in summer can easily reach 40 °C (104 °F), because of its continental nature, wintry weather is still somewhat common between the months of December and March, and it usually snows for a week or two. The highest recorded temperature is 42.5 °C (108.5 °F) on 31 July 2000, and the coldest recorded was −14.0 °C (6.8 °F) on 22 February 1985.

Climate data for Mardin (1991–2020 normals, extremes 1941–2023)
Month	Jan	Feb	Mar	Apr	May	Jun	Jul	Aug	Sep	Oct	Nov	Dec	Year
Record high °C (°F)	19.4 (66.9)	19.5 (67.1)	27.5 (81.5)	33.6 (92.5)	36.1 (97.0)	40.0 (104.0)	42.5 (108.5)	42.0 (107.6)	40.5 (104.9)	35.6 (96.1)	26.1 (79.0)	24.1 (75.4)	42.5 (108.5)
Mean daily maximum °C (°F)	6.7 (44.1)	8.2 (46.8)	12.8 (55.0)	18.2 (64.8)	24.6 (76.3)	31.6 (88.9)	35.9 (96.6)	35.5 (95.9)	30.7 (87.3)	23.9 (75.0)	14.9 (58.8)	8.8 (47.8)	21.0 (69.8)
Daily mean °C (°F)	3.7 (38.7)	4.7 (40.5)	8.8 (47.8)	14.0 (57.2)	19.9 (67.8)	26.1 (79.0)	30.3 (86.5)	30.2 (86.4)	25.6 (78.1)	19.3 (66.7)	11.2 (52.2)	5.8 (42.4)	16.6 (61.9)
Mean daily minimum °C (°F)	1.3 (34.3)	1.8 (35.2)	5.5 (41.9)	10.2 (50.4)	15.4 (59.7)	20.9 (69.6)	25.2 (77.4)	25.5 (77.9)	21.3 (70.3)	15.5 (59.9)	8.1 (46.6)	3.4 (38.1)	12.8 (55.0)
Record low °C (°F)	−13.4 (7.9)	−14.0 (6.8)	−11.7 (10.9)	−5.3 (22.5)	2.6 (36.7)	0.6 (33.1)	11.8 (53.2)	12.8 (55.0)	8.0 (46.4)	−2.5 (27.5)	−9.5 (14.9)	−11.9 (10.6)	−14.0 (6.8)
Average precipitation mm (inches)	95.4 (3.76)	92.2 (3.63)	83.5 (3.29)	66.8 (2.63)	51.7 (2.04)	8.8 (0.35)	4.8 (0.19)	4.2 (0.17)	5.4 (0.21)	31.7 (1.25)	64.6 (2.54)	101.0 (3.98)	610.1 (24.02)
Average precipitation days (≥ 1 mm)	9.5	9.1	9.0	7.8	6.0	2.0	1.4	1.4	1.4	4.5	6.0	8.9	67.0
Average snowy days	3	1.9	1.2	0	0	0	0	0	0	0	0	1.4	7.5
Average relative humidity (%)	64.7	62.1	57.0	51.9	41.3	30.5	25.9	26.9	31.7	42.6	52.9	62.7	45.8
Mean monthly sunshine hours	141.9	144.3	188.8	228.7	307.8	368.0	389.0	354.5	311.6	236.2	179.8	134.4	2,985
Source 1: Turkish State Meteorological Service
Source 2: NOAA (precipitation days, humidity, sun 1991-2020), Meteomanz (snow days 2013-2023)

== Demographics ==
The English traveler Mark Sykes recorded Mardin as a city inhabited by Arabs, Armenians, and Jacobites in the early 20th century. 12,609 Orthodox Syriacs and 7,692 Armenians (most of them Catholic) lived in the town, all of them Arabic-speaking. During the late Ottoman genocides, most of the Christians were killed, no matter their ethnicity.

Mother tongue, Mardin District, 1927 Turkish census
Turkish	Arabic	Kurdish	Circassian	Armenian	Unknown or other language
5,820	25,698	15,640	15	5	309

Religion, Mardin District, 1927 Turkish census
Muslim	Christian	Jewish	Unknown or other religion
41,675	1,617	2	4,513

Today, the city is predominantly Kurdish and Arab, with significant communities of Syriac Christians. Official census data does not record the number and proportion of citizens from different ethnicities and religions, but a 2013 study estimated that around 49% of the population identified as Arab and around 49% identified as Kurdish. The city can be divided into three parts: the Old Mardin (Eski Mardin) which is predominantly populated by Arabs with some Kurdish and Syriac families, the Slums (Gecekondu) which are mainly inhabited by Kurds who have escaped the Kurdish Turkish conflict in the 1980-1990s, and the New City (Yenişehir) where the wealthiest people live. The civil servants are mostly Turks, which constitute a minority in the city.

== Ecclesiastical history ==
A bishopric of the Assyrian Church of the East was centered on the town when it was part of the Roman province of Assyria. It was a suffragan see of Edessa, the provincial metropolitan see. It eventually became part of the Catholic Church in the late 17th century AD following a breakaway from the Assyrian Church, and is the (nominal) seat of three sees of the Catholic Church: the current Chaldean Catholic Eparchy of Mardin and two (now) titular sees under the ancient name of the town: former Armenian Catholic Archeparchy of Mardin, now Titular see of Mardin only, and former Syriac Catholic Eparchy of Mardin and Amida, now titular see (initially as mere Eparchy).

== Economy ==
Historically, Mardin produced sesame. Mardin province continues to produce agricultural products including sesame, barley, wheat, corn, cotton, and others. Angora goats are raised in the area and there is small industry that weaves cotton and wool. Agricultural enterprises are often family-based, varying in size. The city was also historically an important regional trading center on the routes between Anatolia, Mesopotamia, and northern Syria. Nowadays, trade with Syria and Iraq depends on political circumstances.

== Architecture ==
Mardin’s architectural landscape reflects centuries of Artuqid, Syriac, and Ottoman influences. Its religious and residential landmarks embody a fusion of Islamic and Christian traditions, which were built almost entirely from beige-colored limestone quarried locally for centuries.

=== Artuqid architecture ===
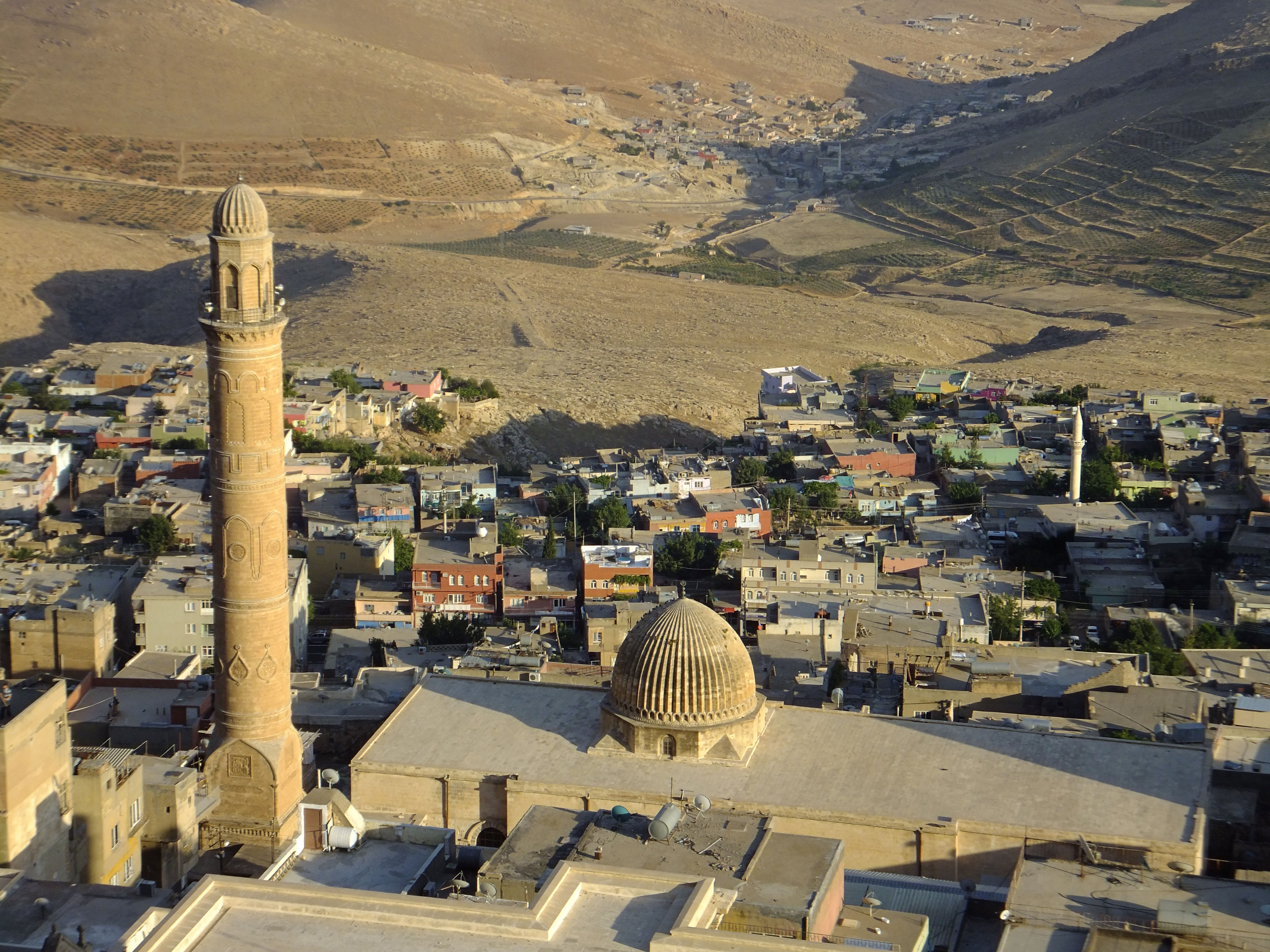
Great Mosque of Mardin

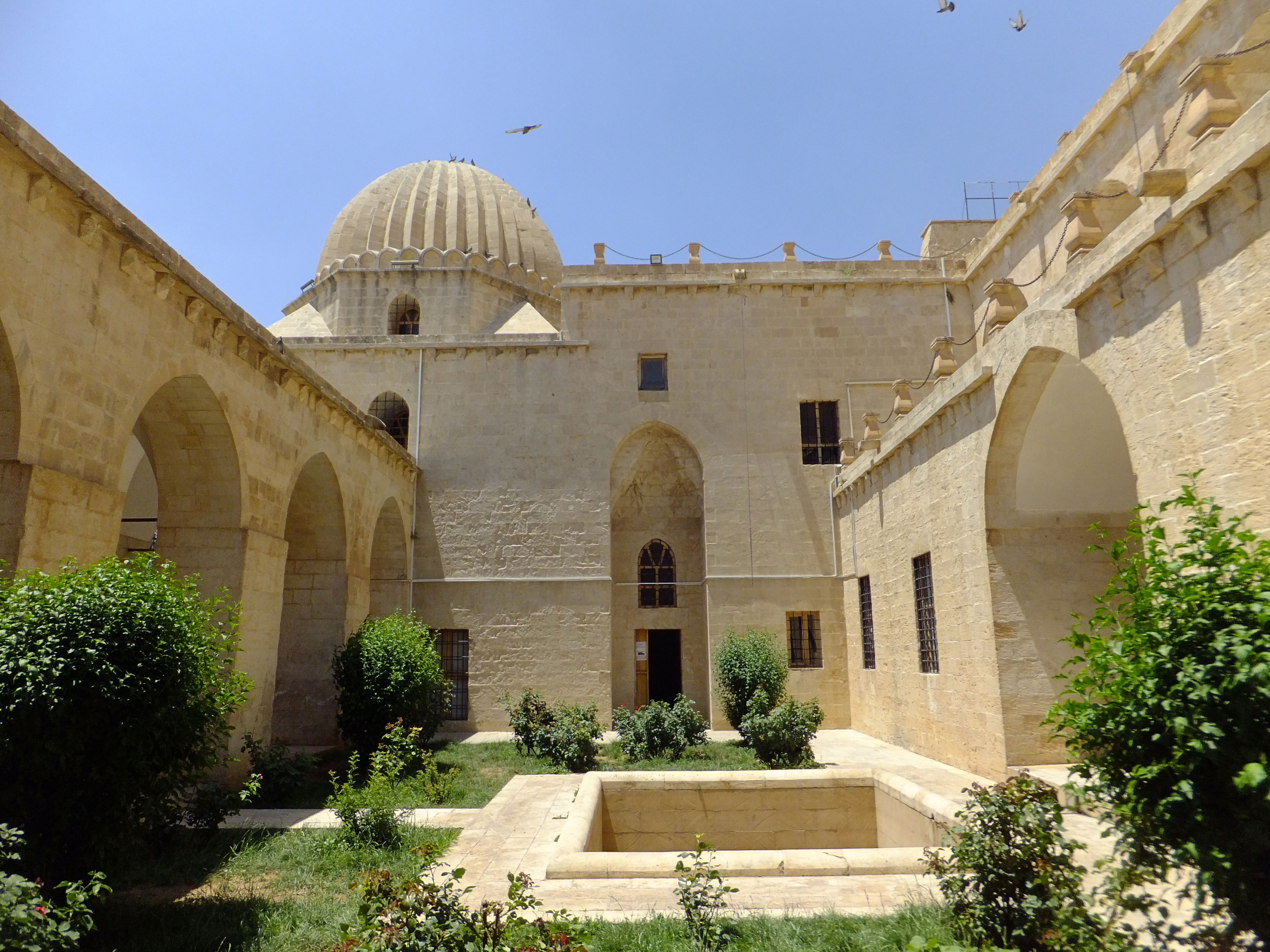
The Sultan Isa or Zincirye Medrese

==== Mosques ====
- Great Mosque of Mardin: The historic main congregational mosque of the city. According to the inscription dated 1176 on the minaret, the mosque, which has sixteen inscriptions, was built by the Artuqid ruler Kutbettin Ilgazi II. According to the inscription in the courtyard, it was built by Hüsameddin Yavlak Arslan, another Artuqid ruler, in 1186. The original structure, which reportedly featured two minarets, was damaged during the Timurid invasions and destroyed during the Battle of Mardin in 1833-1835. It was rebuilt afterward, likely following the original layout. Today, only the north wall and the carved wooden minbar (pulpit) survive from the Artquid period.
- Şehidiye Mosque: It was built by Melik Mansur Nasreddin Artuk Aslan, and later expanded during the Ottoman period. The structure, which presents a madrasa layout with a porticoed courtyard and iwans, with a two-aisled mosque on the south side, has undergone numerous alterations, repairs, and additions, leaving little of the madrasa's original state. Its minaret was rebuilt in 1916/17 by the Ottoman Armenian architect Sarkis Lole.
- Latifiye Mosque: It was built in 1314 by Abdüllatif bin Abdullah, who served during the reign of the Artuqid sultans Melik Saleh and Melik Muzaffar. Its minaret was added in the 19th century by the Egyptian governor Muhammad Ziya Tayyar Pasha.
- Melik Mahmut Mosque: According to the mosque's inscription found at Savur Gate, it was built between 1312-1362 by the Artuqid ruler Melik Salih. The mosque's name is derived from the fact that the tomb of the Artuqid ruler Melik Mahmut is located here. It is known for its richly carved entrance portal and central dome.
- Necmeddin Mosque: It was built by Emineddin Sökmen, the son of Artuk Bey, and completed by his brother Necmeddin Ilgazi as part of the broader Emineddin Külliye, a social complex. Local tradition holds that Necmeddin Ilgazi himself was buried within the mosque, contributing to its identification as the "Yellow Mosque" after his tomb. Today, only portions of the original mosque survive, including the prayer hall and remains of the minaret and arcaded structures.
- Nizameddin Begaz Mosque: It was built under the patronage of Nizameddin Begaz, who served as vizier of Artuqid ruler Kutbettin Ilgazi II, at the Diyarbakır gate in 1186 AD.
- Sheikh Salih Mosque: It is not known when and by whom it was built, though it is accepted to belong to the late Artuqid period. A domed tomb (türbe) next to the mosque contains the burial of a person named Salih, and an additional tomb approximately 50 meters to the west holds the remains of someone named Şirin, both enclosed within chiseled stone sarcophagi.
- Kale Mosque: It is documented that the mosque underwent repairs in 1269, as indicated by an inscription attributed to Necmeddin İlgazi, an Artuqid ruler. However, the exact date of its initial construction remains unknown.
- Hamidiye Mosque: It was built in 1347 by Şeyh Zebuni, who himself is buried within the mosque. It features a single-domed, rectangular floor plan, and is complemented by two courtyards, one of which is arcaded. In the late 19th century, it underwent renovation by Hamit Pasha, at which point the mosque acquired its current name.
- Suleyman Pasha Mosque: Built in 1195 by Kudbeddin ibn Emir Ali Sincari, the vizier of Artuqid ruler Melik Isa, the mosque retains its original Artuqid structure and continues to serve as a local place of worship.
- Şeyh Çabuk Mosque: A mosque of uncertain date, though it is accepted to have been built no later than the 15th century, during the Akkoyonlu period. It is named after Abdullah bin Enes el-Cüheyni, known as "Şeyh Çabuk", a messenger of Prophet Mohammad, whose tomb lies adjacent to the mosque. It was restored in the 19th century, with the gate bearing an inscription dating to 1843, and the old minaret was rebuilt in 1969 by a philanthropist from Mardin named Haci Izzi Çaçan.
- Tekiye Mosque: Foundation records indicate that the mosque was built by Ibrahim Tekye in 1445, the nephew of the Akkoyunlu Kasim Bey, and that the madrasa building, the bulk of which has survived to this day, was commissioned by Ibrahim Tekye's wife, Şah Sultan Hatun.
- Zeynel Abidin Mosque Complex: It is an Islamic complex built in 1159, according to the inscription on the tomb of Molla Zeynel Abidin, a reputed 13th-generation descendant of Prophet Muhammad, and his sister Sitti Zeynep, within the mosque.
- Kızıltepe Ulu Mosque: Its construction began by Hüsâmeddin Yavlak Arslan (1184-1200) and was completed during the reign of his son Nasireddin Artuk Arslan (1200-1239). It repeats the plan of the Grand Mosque of Mardin with the mihrab section placed on the axis. The mosque underwent major restoration from 2015 to 2019.
- Reyhaniye Mosque: Mosque of uncertain date, probably of the Akkoyonlu or early Ottoman period (15th-16th centuries).

==== Medreses ====
- Sultan İsa (or Zinciriye) Medrese: One of the most impressive Islamic monuments in the city, dated to 1385, during the reign of Artuqid sultan Al-Zahir Majd al-Din 'Isa (r. 1376–1407). Built as a madrasa, it also includes a mosque (prayer hall) and a mausoleum, arranged around two inner courtyards. The mausoleum was likely intended to be Sultan 'Isā's burial site, but he was never buried here after his death in battle. It has an imposing entrance portal carved with muqarnas, and two ribbed domes over the mausoleum and the mosque that are visible on the city's skyline.
- Kasım Pasha (or Kasımiye) Medrese: Another major Islamic monument begun by Sultan 'Isa but left unfinished upon his death in 1407. It was completed in 1445, under Akkoyonlu rule. It is located to the west, just outside of the town. It has a large central courtyard, a monumental portal, and three domes arranged near the front façade.
- Hatuniye Medrese or Sitt Ridwiyya Madrasa: Believed to have been built by the Artuqid sultan Qutb ad-Din Il-Ghazi II (r. 1175–1184), with a mausoleum that may have been intended for the sultan's mother, Sitt Ridwiyya (Sitti Radviyye). The building now serves as a mosque. Both the prayer hall and the mausoleum contain finely-decorated mihrabs.

==== Citadels ====
- Mardin Castle: The citadel occupies a long ridge at the city's highest point. It was probably first built under the Hamdanids (10th century), but its present walls were likely rebuilt in the Akkoyonlu and Ottoman eras, possibly with some reuse of Artuqid materials. Up until the 19th century it was densely inhabited, but is now occupied by a military radar station. The interior includes the remains of a small mosque.

==== Külliyes ====
- Emineddin Külliyesi: A külliye (religious and charitable complex), believed to be the oldest Islamic monument in the city, founded by Emin ed-Din, the brother of Sultan Najm ad-Din Il-Ghazi (r. 1115–1122). Il-Ghazi may have finished the complex after his brother's death. The complex contains a mosque, a former madrasa, a fountain, and a hammam (bathhouse).

==== Churches ====
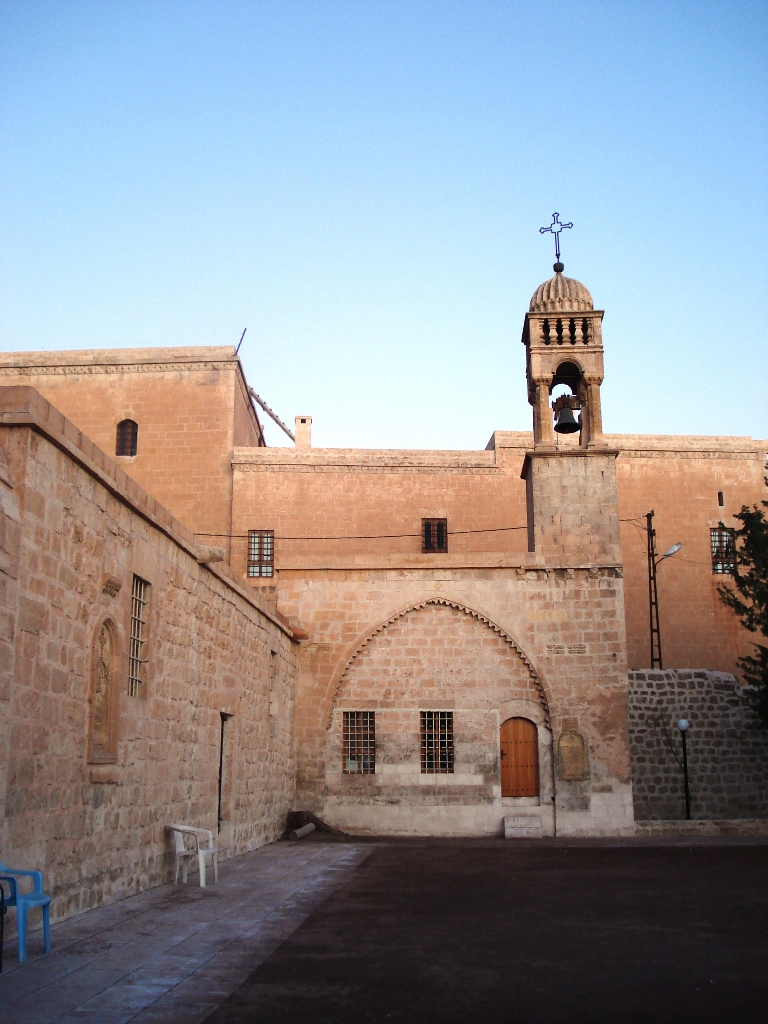
Mor Behnam or Kırklar (Forty Martyrs) Church

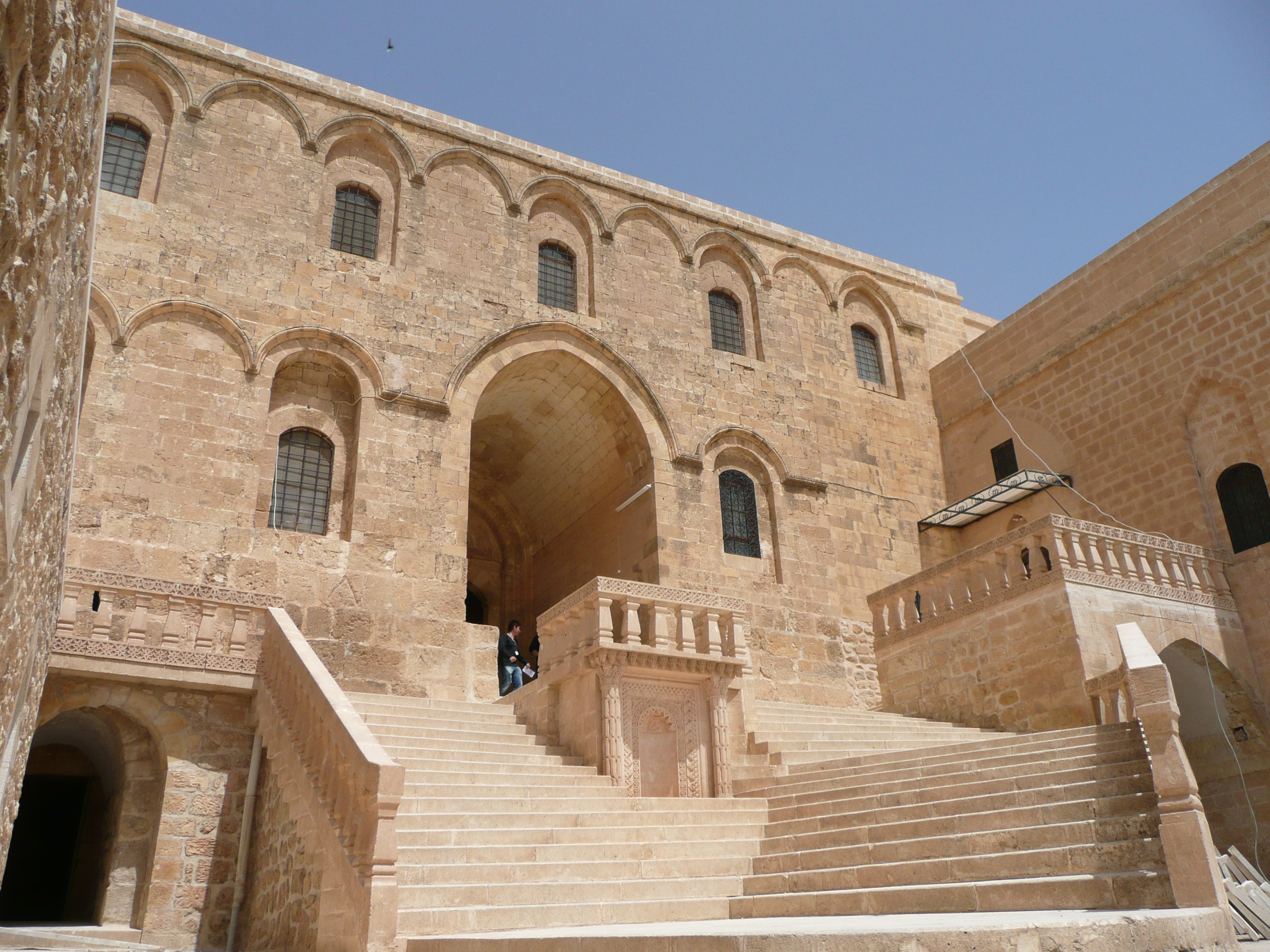
Mor Hananyo Monastery, also known as the Saffron Monastery

- Meryem Ana (Virgin Mary) Church: A Syriac Catholic Church, built in 1895 as the Patriarchal Church, as the Syriac Catholic see was in Mardin up until the Assyrian genocide.
- Red (Surp Kevork) Church: An Armenian Apostolic Church renovated in 2015
- Mor Yusuf (Surp Hovsep; St Joseph) Church: An Armenian Catholic Church
- Mor Behnam or Kırklar (Forty Martyrs) Church: A Syriac Orthodox Church with a niche containing the remains of Mar Behnam. The building dates from the mid-6th century. In 1293 it became the Syriac Patriarchal Church. Residential annexes for the Patriarchate were expanded in the 19th and early 20th centuries.
- Mor Hirmiz Church: A Chaldean Catholic Church in Mardin. It was once the Metropolitan cathedral of the Chaldean Catholic Eparchy of Mardin, prior to it lapsing in 1941. Nevertheless, One Chaldean family remains to maintain it. The building, or at least its overall design, may date from the 16th or 17th century.
- Mor Mihail Church: A Syriac Orthodox Church located on the southern edge of Mardin.
- Mor Simuni Church: A Syriac Orthodox Church with a large courtyard. The building may date from the 12th century.
- Mor Petrus and Pavlus (SS. Peter and Paul) Church: A 160-year-old Syriac Orthodox Church, recently renovated.
- Mor Cercis Church
- Deyrü'z-Zafaran Monastery, or Monastery of St. Ananias, is 5 kilometers southeast of the city. The Syriac Orthodox Saffron Monastery was founded in 493 AD and is one of the oldest monasteries in the world and the largest in Southern Turkey, alongside Mor Gabriel Monastery. From 1160 until 1932, it was the seat of the Syriac Orthodox Patriarch, until the Patriarchate relocated to the Syrian capital Damascus. The site of the monastery itself is said to have been used as a temple by sun worshipers as long ago as 2000 BC.

==== Museums ====
- Mardin Museum: an archeological museum dedicated to the city's history, opened in 2000, housed in the former Syriac Catholic Patriarchate building constructed in 1895, next to the Meryem Ana Church.

=== Architecture ===
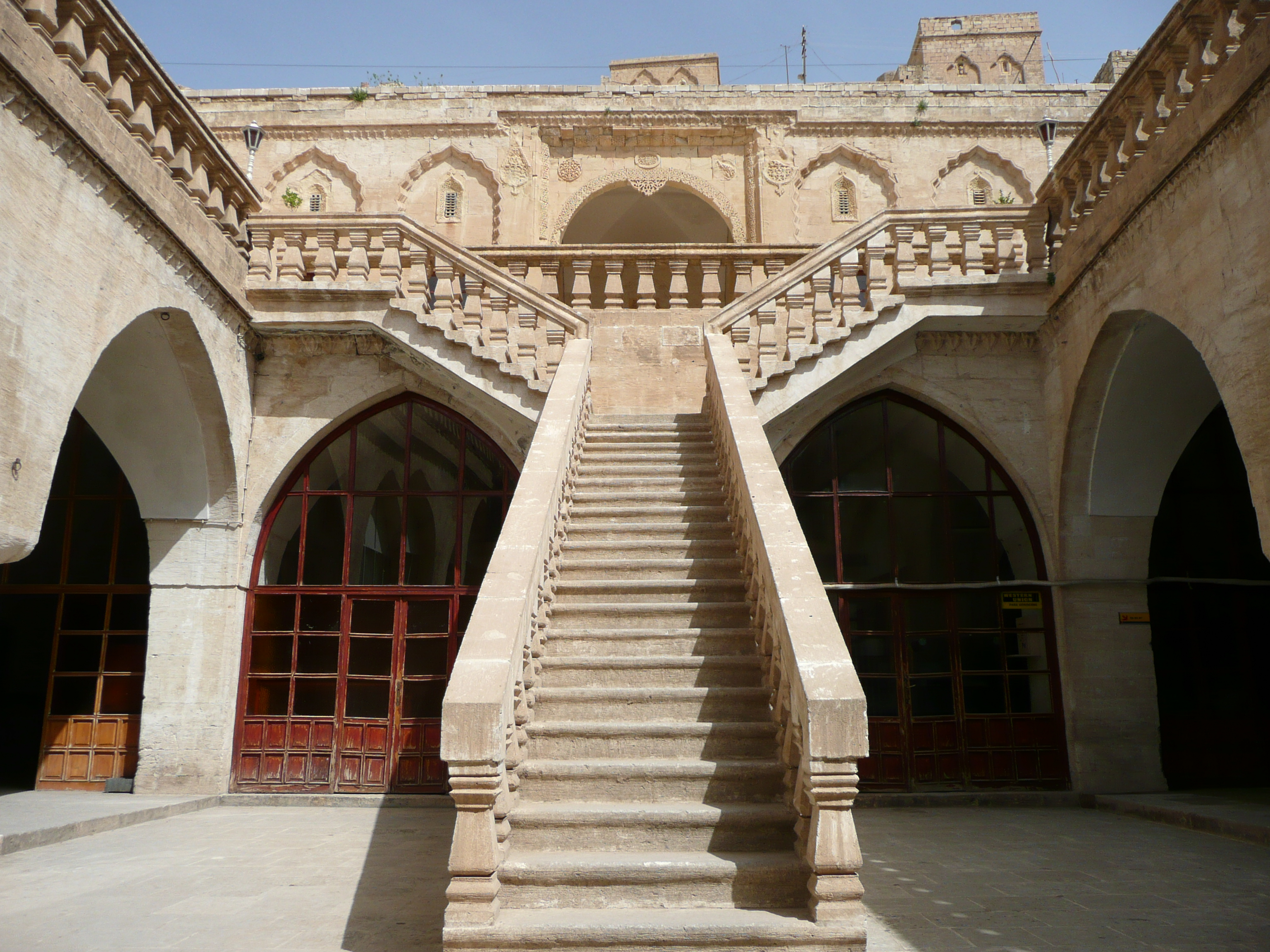
Mardin Post Office, an example of traditional domestic architecture

Houses in Mardin tend to have multiple levels and terraces to accommodate their sloping site, giving the old city its "stepped" appearance from afar. They are typically centered around an internal courtyard, similar to other houses in the region. Larger houses, as well as other public buildings, tend to have stone-carved decoration around their windows. The courtyard of larger houses is often on the lower level, while the upper levels "step back" from this courtyard, giving the house an appearance similar to a "grand staircase" when seen from the courtyard.

== Politics ==
In the 2014 local elections, Ahmet Türk of the Democratic Regions Party (DBP) was elected mayor of Mardin. However, on 21 November 2016 he was detained on terror charges after being dismissed from his post by Turkish authorities. A trustee was appointed as mayor instead. In the Municipal elections in March 2019 Türk was re-elected, but was dismissed from his post in August 2019, accused of supporting terrorism. Mustafa Yaman, the governor of Mardin Province, was appointed as acting mayor.

== Notable locals ==
- Masawaih al-Mardini, 10th-century physician
- Nabia Abbott 1897–1981, scholar of early Islam, papyrologist and paleographer
- Februniye Akyol, Syriac co-mayor of Mardin (2014–2016)
- Keki Abdi Pasha, Ottoman statesman
- Muammer Güler, governor
- Malak Karsh, photographer
- Feyyaz Duman, Turkish actor of Kurdish descent
- Agnes Fenenga (1874–1949), Dutch-born American missionary teacher in Mardin, 1901–1933
- Yousuf Karsh, photographer
- Sultan Kösen, the world's tallest living man since 2009.
- Ignatius Maloyan (1869–1915), Armenian Catholic Archbishop, Christian martyr
- Pervin Chakar, Kurdish opera singer
- Sarkis Lole, Ottoman Armenian chief architect of Mardin
- Murathan Mungan, poet and writer
- Mümtaz Tahincioğlu, head of TOMSFED
- Bülent Tekin, poet and writer
- Masum Türker, former Minister of Finance
- Mem Ararat, Kurdish singer

== International relations ==
=== Twin towns—sister cities ===
Mardin is twinned with:

- Ljubljana, Slovenia, since 2003

== Sport in Mardin ==
- Mardinspor
- Mardin 1969 Spor

== See also ==
- Shamsīyah
- Armenians in Turkey
- Syriacs in Turkey
- Kurds in Turkey
- Yazidis in Turkey

== General sources ==
- Ayliffe, Rosie, et al. (2000). The Rough Guide to Turkey. London: Rough Guides.
- Herbermann, Charles, ed. (1913). "Mardin" . Catholic Encyclopedia. New York: Robert Appleton Company.
- della Valle, Pietro (1843), Viaggi, Brighton, I: 515
- Gaunt, David: Massacres, Resistance, Protectors: Muslim-Christian Relations in Eastern Anatolia During World War I, Gorgias Press, Piscataway (NJ) 2006 I
- Grigore, George (2007), L'arabe parlé à Mardin. Monographie d'un parler arabe périphérique. Bucharest: Editura Universitatii din Bucuresti, ISBN 978-973-737-249-9
- Jastrow, Otto (1969), Arabische Textproben aus Mardin und Asex, in "Zeitschrift der Deutschen Morgenländischen Gesellschaft" (ZDMG) 119 : 29–59.
- Jastrow, Otto (1992), Lehrbuch der Turoyo-Sprache in "Semitica Viva – Series Didactica", Wiesbaden : Otto Harrassowitz.
- Minorsky, V. (1991), Mārdīn, in "The Encyclopaedia of Islam". Leiden: E. J. Brill.
- Niebuhr, Carsten (1778), Reisebeschreibung, Copenhagen, II:391-8
- Sasse, Hans-Jürgen (1971), Linguistische Analyse des Arabischen Dialekts der Mhallamīye in der Provinz Mardin (Südossttürkei), Berlin.
- Shumaysani, Hasan (1987), Madinat Mardin min al-fath al-'arabi ila sanat 1515. Bayrūt: 'Ālam al-kutub.
- Socin, Albert (1904), Der Arabische Dialekt von Mōsul und Märdīn, Leipzig.
- Tavernier, Jean-Baptiste (1692), Les six voyages, I:187
- Wittich, Michaela (2001), Der arabische Dialekt von Azex, Wiesbaden: Harrassowitz.
