= Shamsīyah =

Mesopotamian solar sect

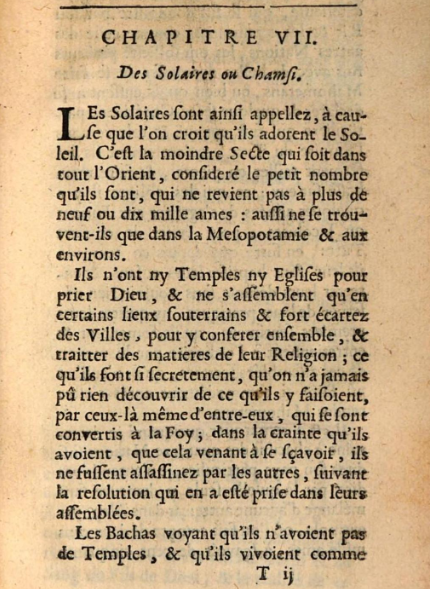
First page on the Solaires ou Chamsi ("sun-people or Chamsi") in Michel Febvre's 1675 L'état present de la Turquie. Febvre identified the Shamsīyah as one of the "fourteen nations" of the Ottoman Empire.

The Shamsīyah (Armenian: Արևորդիներ, romanized: Arevordiner, Syriac: ܫܶܡܫܳܝ̈ܐ, romanized: Šemšāyē) were a tribe or sect of sun-worshippers in northern Mesopotamia, concentrated in the city of Mardin (in modern south-eastern Turkey) and the surrounding Tur Abdin region. They converted to the Syriac Orthodox Church in the 17th century in order to avoid persecution in the Ottoman Empire but retained their own set of beliefs and practices; many travellers who observed and met with them doubted the extent to which they were actually Christian. There were still about a hundred families who identified as Shamsīyah in Mardin in the early 20th century but they appear to have since disappeared.

== Terminology ==
Shamsīyah means "sun-people" or "sons of the sun". Various alternate transliterations and anglicizations of the name have been used through the centuries, including Shamsi, Shamsiyya, Chamsi, Schemsîe, Shemsiye, Shemsi, Shemsy, Shemshi, Shemseeah, Şemsi, and Shemshiehs. The name did not originate as a self-identity, instead being imposed on the Shamsīyah by adherents of the Syriac Orthodox Church. The name derives from the Arabic word Al-Shams (الشمس, "the sun"). (Note: The Arabic word Al-Shams (or šams) is a cognate of the ancient Akkadian word for sun, šamšu, which is also the origin of the name Shamash.) The Armenian inhabitants of Mardin and surrounding settlements called adherents of the sect Arevortik, also meaning "sons of the sun".

The native language used by the Shamsīyah themselves is not known since they spoke different languages and claimed different ethnic origins depending on the ethnicity of the person they spoke with. They have variously been suggested to have been Assyrians, Armenians, Yazidis, or even Oghuz Turks, among other hypotheses. The Shamsīyah considered themselves to be a distinct group and were unwilling to intermarry with other religious groups.

== History ==
=== Origin ===
Remnants of an ancient sun temple, with a small hole in its eastern wall, in the basement of the Mor Hananyo Monastery

According to the Assyriologist Simo Parpola, the Shamsīyah were possibly the last known adherents of a late version of the ancient Mesopotamian religion, an ancient set of beliefs thought to have first formed in Mesopotamia in the sixth millennium BC. This would make them the longest standing pagan community in Mesopotamia.

Mesopotamia was largely Christian by the third century AD. The sun god Shamash (also called Utu in Sumerian) is recorded in ancient Mesopotamian sources from the earliest periods and his cult was particularly strong in Syria and northern Mesopotamia; many early churches in the region were repurposed pagan sun-temples (like churches, these faced east towards the rising sun). The important 5th-century Syriac Orthodox monastery Mor Hananyo, located near Mardin, was built on top of an ancient temple dedicated to Shamash. The present inhabitants of the region connect the builders of the ancient sun-temples to the later Shamsīyah.

In addition to ancient Mesopotamian beliefs, the Shamsīyah may have been influenced by Yazidism (Yazidis also pray facing the sun) and perhaps Gnosticism and Zoroastrianism. The Turkish historian Ugur Ümit Üngör has described the Shamsīyah as "archaic sun-worshippers" and believed them to mostly have their religious origin among the Zoroastrians. The Shamsīyah might have been connected to the "Sabians" of Harran, another poorly understood Mesopotamian sect active in the early Middle Ages; the Harran Sabians have also been suggested to have been adherents of the ancient Mesopotamian religion.

=== Medieval records ===
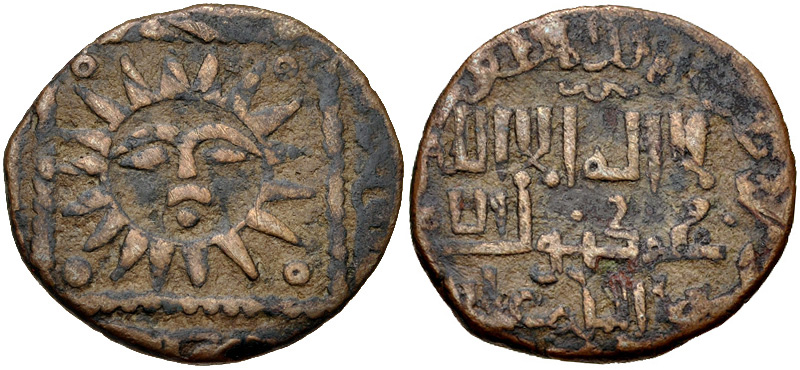
Coin minted at Mardin by the Artuqid ruler Al-Muzaffar Fakhr al-Din Kara Arslan (1260–1292), prominently incorporating solar iconography

Armenian records demonstrate knowledge of the Shamsīyah from at least the fifth century AD onwards.

In the sixth century, Paulicians (a medieval Christian sect) organized rebellions against Armenian nobility and Byzantine authorities. In northern Syria, Paulicians were according to Armenian records joined by Armenian Muslims, the "sun-worshippers" (arevortik), and some Arab sects. Medieval Armenian sources record the presence of sun-worshippers in northern Syria for centuries, sometimes involved in local conflicts and conspiracies. Armenian sources appear to consider the north-Syrian sun-worshippers to be Armenians whose faith was connected either to Paulicianism or Zoroastrianism. Whether these specific sun-worshippers were Armenians has been doubted by modern historians since the first modern study on the subject, by Grigor Vantsian in 1896.

15th-century Syriac-language sources suggest that significant numbers of sun-worshippers converted and were welcomed into the Syriac Orthodox Church already in the sixth century AD. A group of sun- or fire-worshippers living in the city of Samsat, perhaps connected to the Shamsīyah, were reported by the Catholicos Nerses IV the Gracious to have converted to Christianity in the 12th century. Coins minted in Mardin in the Middle Ages during the city's rule by the Turkish Artuqid dynasty and the Mongol Empire are noted for prominently incorporating solar iconography, both in the form of the Lion and Sun emblem but also in the form of just the sun alone.

=== Conversion to Christianity ===
The Shamsīyah, or adherents of similar beliefs, were once numerous in the northern lands around the Tigris river, worshipping in temples throughout a region largely corresponding to the Ottoman Diyarbekir vilayet. By the 17th century, the group was largely confined to Mardin. They had a separate cemetery and their own quarters in the city. The enclosed Shamsīyah neighborhood in Mardin, referred to as Shemsiyye, was located on the southern perimeter of Mardin. This neighborhood corresponds to Mardin's modern-day neighborhood of Babussor/Savurkapı. The Shamsīyah apparently congregated in a temple located in the vicinity of the city gate, remnants of which survived until recent times.

Since the Shamsīyah were few in number, they long remained largely unnoticed to the outside world. They first came to the attention of the government of the Ottoman Empire when Sultan Murad IV (r. 1623–1640) passed through Mardin on his way back following the 1638 capture of Baghdad. The sultan noted that Mardin was home to about hundred families of sun-worshippers, based on tax records about four hundred people. Under Islamic law, depending on the school of thought in Sunni Islam followers of religions not among those of the People of the Book (Islam, Christianity, Judaism and Sabians) are condemned to choose conversion, exile or death mainly in the Hanbali madhab. Since the Shamsīyah freely admitted to the sultan that they were not People by the Book, Murad ordered them all to be executed. The Syriac Orthodox patriarch, Ignatius Hidayat Allah, however took pity on them and agreed to baptize the Shamsīyah to safeguard them from execution and persecution. Although they were from that point on considered to be Christians and outwardly conformed to Syriac Orthodox beliefs and practices, they kept their old name and continued some of their own pre-Christian traditions. The conversion may have been entirely nominal, with many continuing to entirely cling to their old practices, albeit in secret.

Many Shamsīyah who did not wish to convert reportedly also fled to Iran or other settlements in the surrounding Tur Abdin region. According to the missionary Giuseppe Campanile, writing in 1818, the Shamsīyah converted only for protection and abandoned all Christian practices after Murad left the city, only actually adopting them in 1763 under pressure from the Syriac Orthodox and bribed government officials. Campanile reported that the entire Shamsīyah community lived in dire poverty.

=== Contact with travellers ===
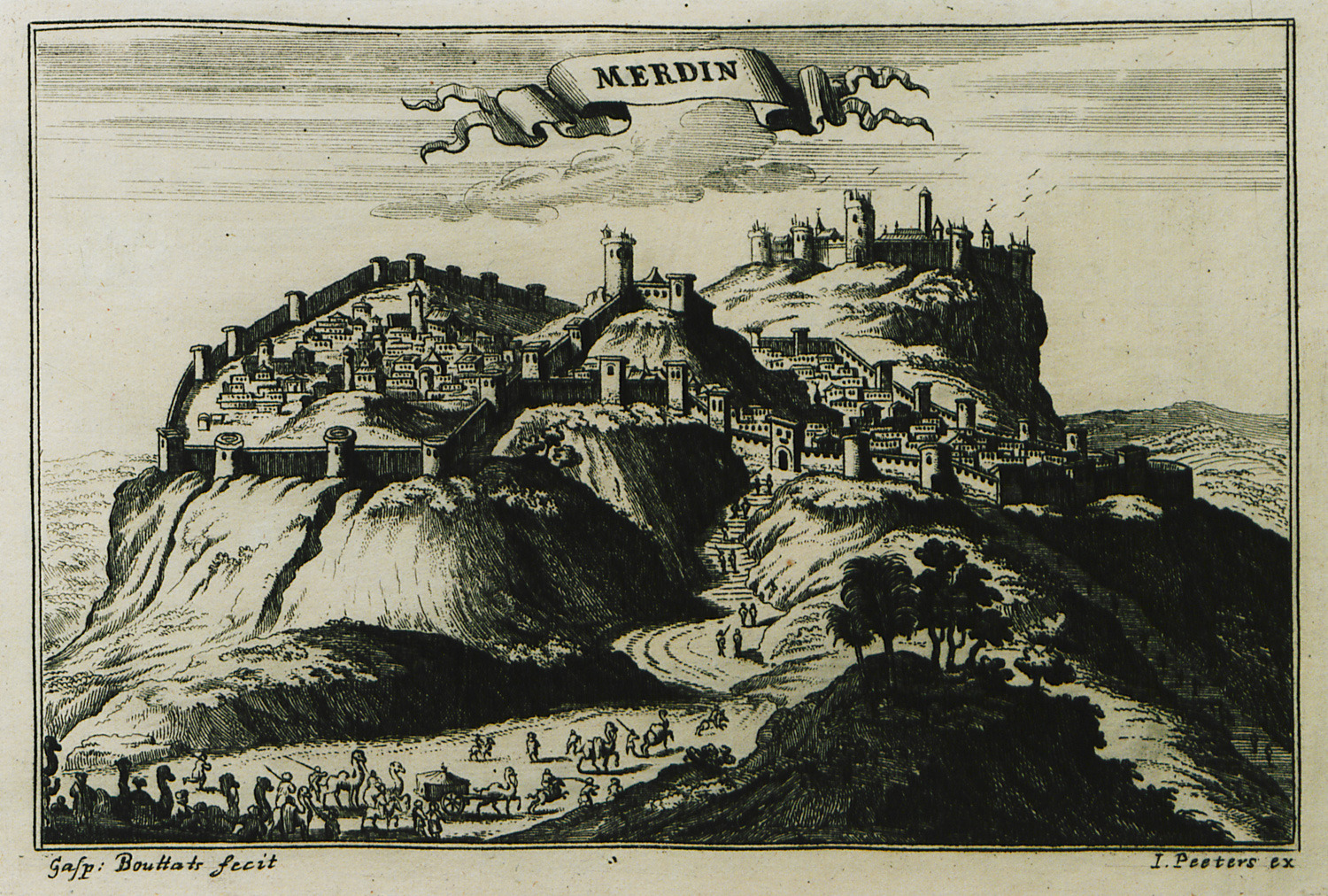
Engraving of Mardin (1690) by the Flemish traveller Jacob Peeters

The Venetian traveller Ambrosio Bembo, who passed through the Ottoman Empire in 1671–1675, noted the presence of five different Christian sects in the city of Diyarbakır (located near Mardin). Among them were the Shamsīyah, who Bembo wrote "were, and still are, worshippers of the sun". The Shamsīyah were considered by the French author Michel Febvre in 1675 to be one of the "fourteen nations" of the Ottoman Empire. Febvre classified them among various "heretical" eastern Christian groups and noted that they had only recently converted from paganism. The German explorer Carsten Niebuhr passed through Mardin in 1766 and noted the presence of the Shamsīyah there. Niebuhr spoke with an old man belonging to the group, who claimed that many of the villages in Tur Abdin had in his youth adhered to their religion but that they by this point were limited to only about a hundred families living in two districts in Mardin and they nominally adhered to the Syriac Orthodox Church. Niebuhr concluded based on the practices he observed that the Shamsīyah were probably adherents of a remnant of the pre-Christian religion in the region.

The Anglican missionary Joseph Wolff, who passed through Mardin in 1824, noted that the Shamsīyah told him that they worshipped "the sun, the moon, and the stars" and that the sun was "their malech, their king"; based on phonetic comparisons Wolff came to the bizarre conclusion that they were idolaters who worshipped the god Moloch. Wolff also noted that they although they dressed like Syriac Christians, they did not intermarry with other members of the Syriac Orthodox Church. According to the British author James Silk Buckingham, the Shamsīyah in 1827 remained "quite distinct, both in belief and practice" and were still sometimes observed to rever the sun. Silk Buckingham claimed that they by this time encompassed about a thousand families. The Austrian historian Joseph von Hammer-Purgstall still considered the Shamsīyah to "worship only the sun" in 1836.

The American missionary Horatio Southgate visited the Shamsīyah in the hills surrounding Mardin in 1837. Southgate reported that they at this time called themselves "sons of Ishmael", though he believed this was only to evade the suspicion of the Ottoman authorities. By 1837, there were around 1,250 Shamsīyah living in Mardin, in 250 households.

=== Disappearance ===
Shamsīyah numbers had shrunk by the late 19th century. When the Guyanese bishop Oswald Parry visited Mardin in 1897 he claimed to have found no trace of the Shamsīyah. Contrary to Parry's report, the British priest and scholar Adrian Fortescue claimed in 1913 that there were still about a hundred families who identified as Shamsīyah in Mardin. Fortescue also doubted the extent to which the Shamsīyah had actually adopted Christianity, referring to them as "a curious group of semi-Christian Jacobites (Note: An informal name sometimes used for followers of the Syriac Orthodox Church.) who were once sun-worshippers".

There were still Shamsīyah in Mardin at the outbreak of World War I but their subsequent fate is unknown and they appear to have since disappeared, perhaps merging into the rest of the Syriac Orthodox Church. They are thus considered to be extinct as a religious group. The only trace of the Shamsīyah in present-day Mardin are architectural traces left behind by the community, most notably the motifs carved by the Shamsīyah at the entrances of their doors, many of which continue to face the sun.

In addition to Syriac Christianity, it is possible that some Shamsīyah converted to Yazidism or Alevism. Yazidi records claim that there were still Shamsīyah living in the region in the 1950s and 1960s. These Shamsīyah are said to have been persuaded by Tahseen Said, the Mîr of the Yazidis, to convert to Yazidism.

== Practices ==
Beyond the fact that the Shamsīyah worshipped the sun, little certain is known of their traditions and practices due to their own unwillingness to disclose them. There are no Shamsīyah-written texts that record the practices and beliefs of the community. Much of what little has been written of their practices is unconfirmed and appears to derive from second-hand sources rather than from direct observation.

Simeon, a Polish traveller who visited Mardin in the early 17th century, claimed that the Shamsīyah gathered in their own temple every Saturday night to pray and hold incestuous orgies; an unlikely claim probably based on prejudices against Eastern religions. According to Febvre in 1675, the Shamsīyah after their conversion adopted the Syriac Orthodox practices of baptisms and burial ceremonies, but kept their own sun-worshipping practices as well, which they performed in secret assemblies.

Niebuhr apparently observed several distinct practices in 1766, including that the Shamsīyah built "the most elegant doors in their house always facing the sunrise", that the prayed facing the sun, and that they pulled the hair from their dead and put a pair of coins in their mouths. Niebuhr also wrote that their weddings were officiated by Syriac Orthodox priests but that the newlyweds after the ceremony were given a ride down a road, passing by a "certain large stone to which they must show great respect". The pulling of hair was also reported by Campanile in 1818, who wrote that they shaved of the beard, hair and body hair of those who were near death since they believed that their sins were tied to their hairs. Similar to Niebuhr, Campanile reported that the Shamsīyah dead were buried with gold and silver jewellery alongside household belongings. The specifics of this differ between the reports; Campanile wrote that the valuables or coins were placed in the hands of the deceased (not the mouths).

According to Campanile, the Shamsīyah prayed three times daily at sunrise, in front of a statue that represented the sun. Campanile further claimed that the Shamsīyah gathered together three times a year to construct a large idol out of dough in the shape of a lamb, cover its head with a piece of cloth, and place it in a tin bowl. Various acts would be performed in front of this idol, such as prayer, adoration, and kissing the idol. In addition to veneration of the sun and this lamb idol, Campanile also claimed that the Shamsīyah venerated cows. In terms of appearance, Campanile stated that members of the group could be distinguished by their white overcoats.

Silk Buckingham wrote in 1827 that the Shamsīyah had refused to give information on their beliefs to other members of the Syriac Orthodox Church and threatened their adherents with death if they did so. According to Silk Buckingham, the Shamsīyah were observed as showing reverence to the sun through removing their turbans during sunrises. Southgate wrote in 1837 that the Shamsīyah by his time were still said to perform their "ancient rites" but did not himself observe any of the practices noted by previous travellers.

In the 20th century, Anastase-Marie al-Karmali met a man who had belonged to a sect but had converted to Christianity. The man told him about the sect's beliefs, which included the belief in a supreme god, the sun, who was male and not female, and that all other gods were under his command, The other gods were the moon, stars, and planets. The sect prostrated themselves before these gods morning, noon, and evening, in secret. At noon, a person would perform several prostrations before the sun. The same ritual was also performed at sunset.

== Opinions regarding the affiliation of the sect ==
Historian Mikael Chamchyan considers Arevordi to be pagans who lived during the time of Gregory the Illuminator in certain border villages of Armenia, where a mixed population — Armenians and other peoples lived. The heretics, who, according to Movses Khorenatsi, were persecuted by Mesrop Mashtots in the 5th century, Chamchyan mistakes for Arevordi and considers them not Armenians, but immigrants from other peoples, who were joined by some of the Armenians.

Another historian B. Sargsyan believes that Arevordi are related by origin to the Manichaeans and were found in Armenia much earlier than the authors of the 11th and subsequent centuries mention them. The English Armenologist F. Conybeare shares the same opinion.

Bishop Karapet Ter-Mkrtchyan writes that the Arevordi have nothing in common with the Paulicians and Tondrakites, but perhaps at times communicated with them and experienced their influence, but what exactly — is unknown. He considers Arevordi to be pagan Armenians who came under the influence of the Babylonian religion. Ter-Mkrtchyan approaches Thomas Metsopetsi’s message that Arevordi, after Tamerlane’s defeat by the machinations of Satan, multiplied again in Merdin and Amid, with doubt, suggesting that the named author under Arevordi could have meant not Arevordi Nerses the Blessed, but modern Yazidi Kurds. It is believed that they are remnants of the Mazdakites.
