= Al-Muzaffar Fakhr al-Din Kara Arslan =

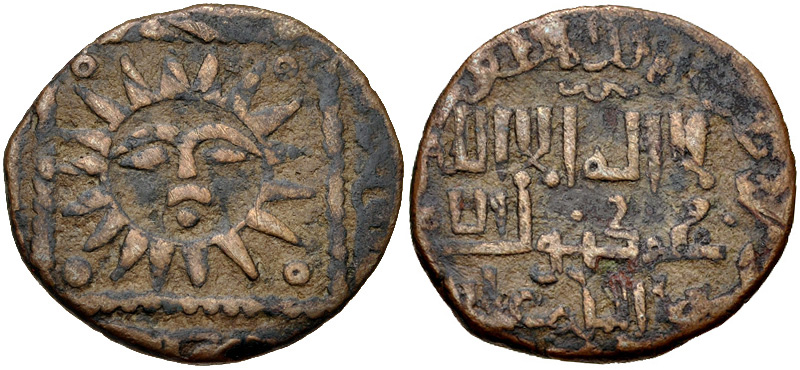
- Coinage of Al-Muzaffar Fakhr al-Din Kara Arslan, Mardin. Sunface surrounded by thick rays within pelleted quadrate border. Kalima and Prophet benediction in four lines; name and titles of al-Muzaffar Fakhr al-Din Qara Arslan in outer margin.

Emir of Mardin
- Reign: 1260–1292
- Predecessor: Al-Sa'id Najm al-Din Ghazi I
- Successor: Al-Sa'id Shams al-Din Dāwūd I
- Issue: Al-Sa'id Shams al-Din Dāwūd I Al-Mansur Najm al-Din Ghazi II
- House: Artuqids
- Father: Al-Sa'id Najm al-Din Ghazi I

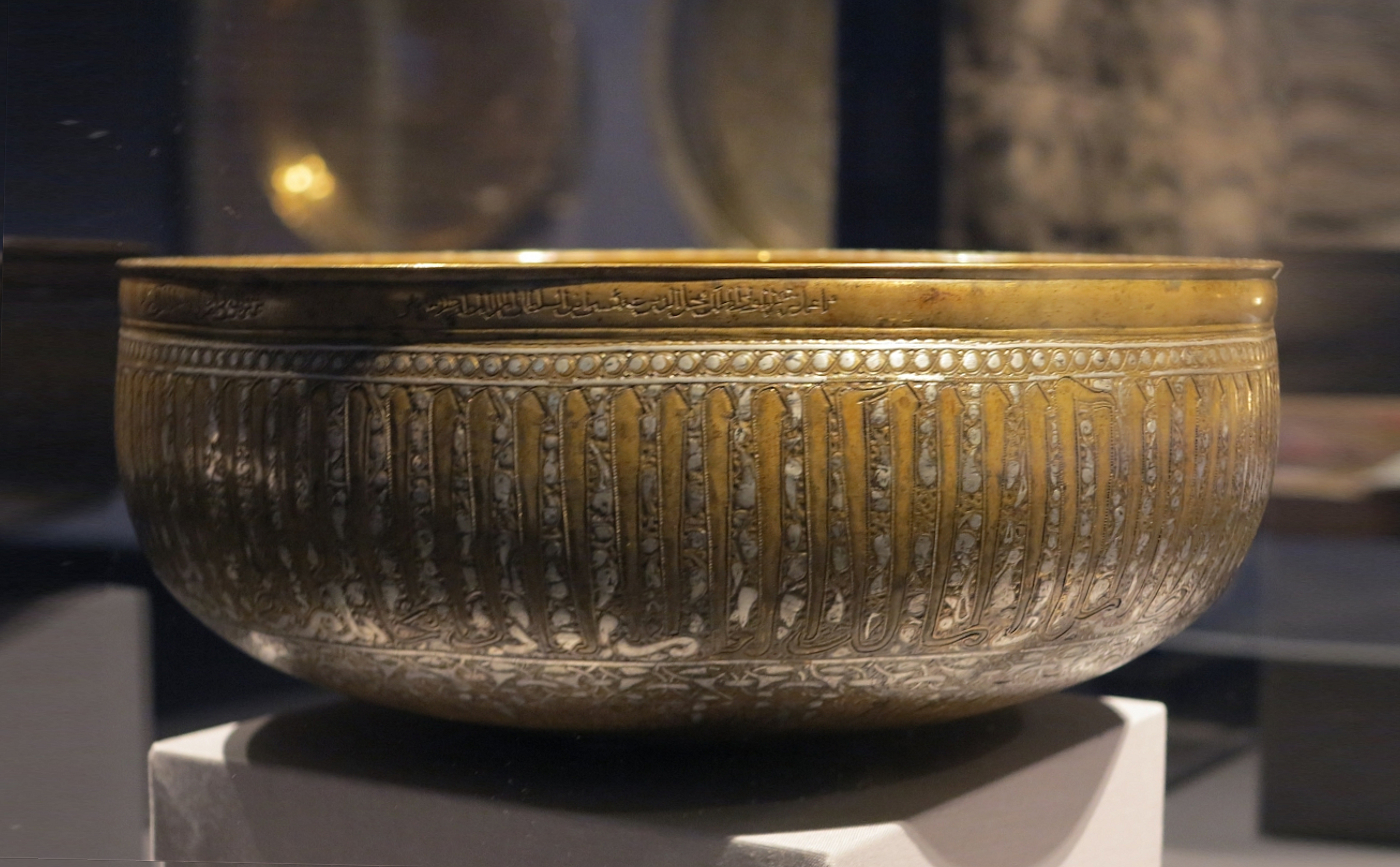
Basin of Sultan Qara Arslan b. Il-Ghazi, Jazira, Syria, or Egypt, late 13th cen. (1289–1292) MIA, Doha.

Al-Muzaffar Fakhr al-Din Kara Arslan was an Artuqid ruler of Mardin (r. 1260–1292), a son of Al-Sa'id Najm al-Din Ghazi I, and grandson of Yuluq Arslan (r.1184–1203). He succeeded his father Al-Sa'id Najm al-Din Ghazi I in 1260, under Mongol suzerainty, following the Mongol siege of Madin.

After the Siege of Mayyafariqin, the Mongol commander Yoshmut was sent to capture Mardin, ruled by Al-Sa'id Najm al-Din Ghazi I. Mardin resisted the siege for over 8 months until the death of Najm al-Din. The new Artuqid bey, his son Kara Arslan (r.1260–1292), surrendered the Mardin castle to Yoshmut in 1260 and accepted Ilkhanate overlordship, submitting to Hulegu.

Qara Arslan struck some copper coinage in his name and that of Hulagu's from 1260 to 1262 CE. Coins minted in Mardin in the Middle Ages during the city's rule by the Artuqid dynasty and the Mongol Empire are noted for prominently incorporating solar iconography, both in the form of the Lion and Sun emblem but also in the form of just the sun alone.

He had two sons who succeeded him in turn:

- Al-Sa'id Shams al-Din Dāwūd I (1292–1294)
- Al-Mansur Najm al-Din Ghazi II (1294–1312)

== Sources ==
- Canby, Sheila R.; Beyazit, Deniz; Rugiadi, Martina; Peacock, A. C. S. (27 April 2016). Court and Cosmos: The Great Age of the Seljuqs. Metropolitan Museum of Art. ISBN 978-1-58839-589-4.
- Bosworth, Clifford Edmund (2004). The New Islamic Dynasties: A Chronological and Genealogical Manual. Edinburgh University Press. ISBN 0-7486-2137-7.
