= Karadeniz Ereğli Museum =

Museum in Ereğli ilçe (district)

Karadeniz Ereğli Museum or Ereğli Museum
- Ereğli Müzesi
- Karadeniz Ereğli Museum
- Established: 1998; 28 years ago
- Location: Orhanlar, Ereğli, Zonguldak, Turkey
- Type: Archaeology, Ethnography
- Collections: Lydian, Hellenistic, Roman, Byzantine, Sassanid, Umayyad, Abbasid, Artukids, Seljukid and Ottoman
- Collection size: 5428
- Owner: Ministry of Culture and Tourism

Karadeniz Ereğli Museum (also known as Ereğli Museum) is a museum in Ereğli ilçe (district) of Zonguldak Province, Turkey. The modifier Karadeniz ("Black Sea") is used to distinguish Ereğli in Zonguldak Province from another similar-named ilçes in Konya and Tekirdağ Provinces.

== Location and history ==
The museum is in Orhanlar neighborhood of Ereğli at 41°16′51″N 31°25′06″E

The museum is actually a 19th-century Ottoman mansion built by Karamahmutoğlu Halil Pasha, a notable of the city. It is a four-storey house (including the ground floor). In past it was used as a women's college. In 1988 it was taken over by the Ministry of Culture. In 1998 after restoration, it was opened as a museum.

== The exhibited items ==
The administrative offices are on the first floor. In the first floor, Hellenistic, Roman and Byzantine artifacts like marble stelai, terracota amphorae and pots, column headings, glass containers, ornaments, metallic items illumination tools and figurines are exhibited. There are also coins from Lydian, Hellenistic, Roman, Byzantine, Sassanid, Umayyad, Abbasid, Artukids, Seljukid and Ottoman eras. In the second floor, ethnographic items such as clothes, Elpek textile (unique to Ereğli area), weapons, ornaments, smoking tools, beads, clocks, kitchen tools, hand written books and bascules are exhibited. The third floor designed as a typical Ereğli house. In the yard there are sarcophagi column headings and plinths, an epitaph and a mausoleum The total number of exhibited items is 5428.
