= Al-Sa'id Najm al-Din Ghazi I =

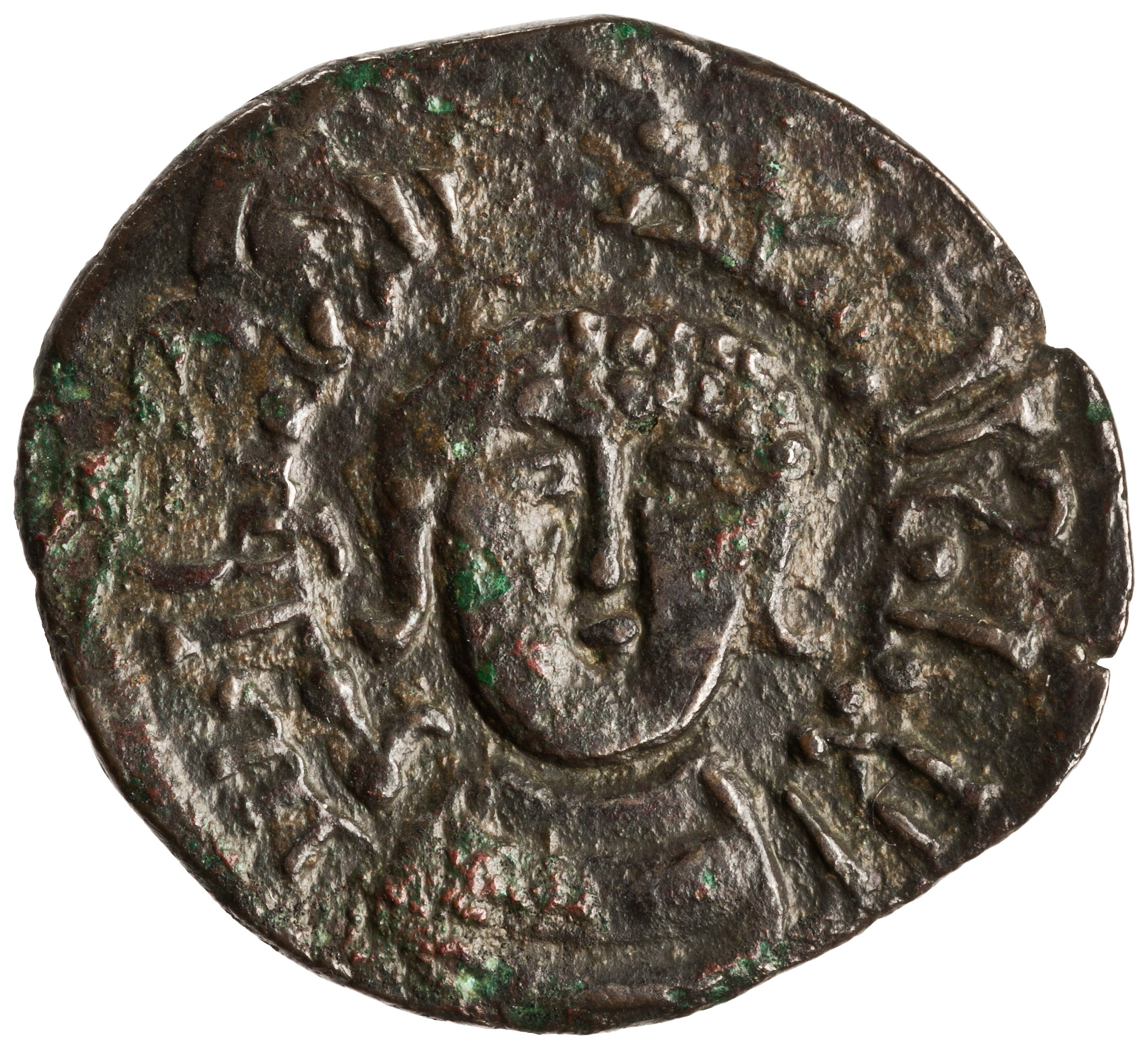
- Coinage of Najm al-Din Ghazi I al-Sa'id, Mardin, 655 H/ 1257–1258 (Obverse).

Emir of Mardin
- Reign: 1239–1260
- Predecessor: Artuk Arslan
- Successor: Al-Muzaffar Fakhr al-Din Kara Arslan
- Issue: Al-Muzaffar Fakhr al-Din Kara Arslan Al-Sa'id Shams al-Din Dāwūd I Al-Mansur Najm al-Din Ghazi II
- House: Artuqids
- Father: Yuluq Arslan

Al-Sa'id Najm al-Din Ghazi I was an Artuqid ruler of Mardin (r. 1239–1260), and a son of Yuluq Arslan (r.1184–1203). He succeeded his brother Artuk Arslan (r. 1203–1239).

After the Siege of Mayyafariqin, the Mongol commander Yoshmut was sent to capture Mardin, ruled by Al-Sa'id Najm al-Din Ghazi I. Mardin resisted the siege for over 8 months until the death of Najm al-Din. The new Artuqid bey, his son Qara Arslan (r.1260–1292), surrendered the Mardin castle to Yoshmut in 1260 and accepted Ilkhanate overlordship, submitting to Hulegu.

== Sources ==
- Bosworth, Clifford Edmund (2004). The New Islamic Dynasties: A Chronological and Genealogical Manual. Edinburgh University Press. ISBN 0-7486-2137-7.
