= Yedi Kardeş Tower =

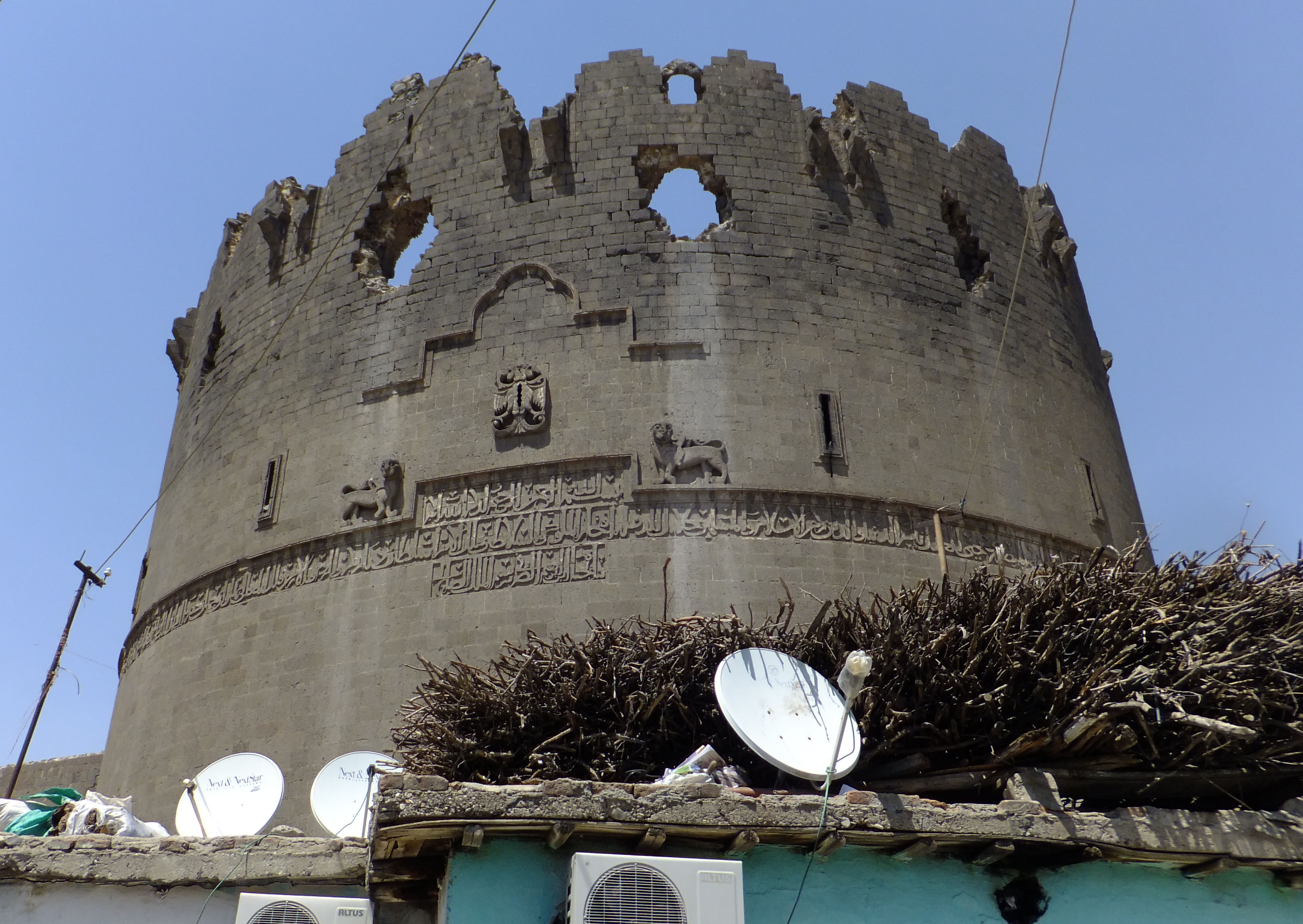
Yedi Kardeş Tower

Yedi Kardeş / Heft Birayan Tower (Yedi Kardeş Burcu / Birca Heft Birayan, "Tower of the Seven Brothers") is a cut basalt tower in Diyarbakir. It was built in 1208 in honor of the leader of the Artukid Turkish dynasty, Melik Salih Mahmut, and designed by the architect Yahya Ibrahim Sufi. It is adorned with the Artukid symbols, Koranic inscriptions and nature reliefs.
