= Yoshmut =

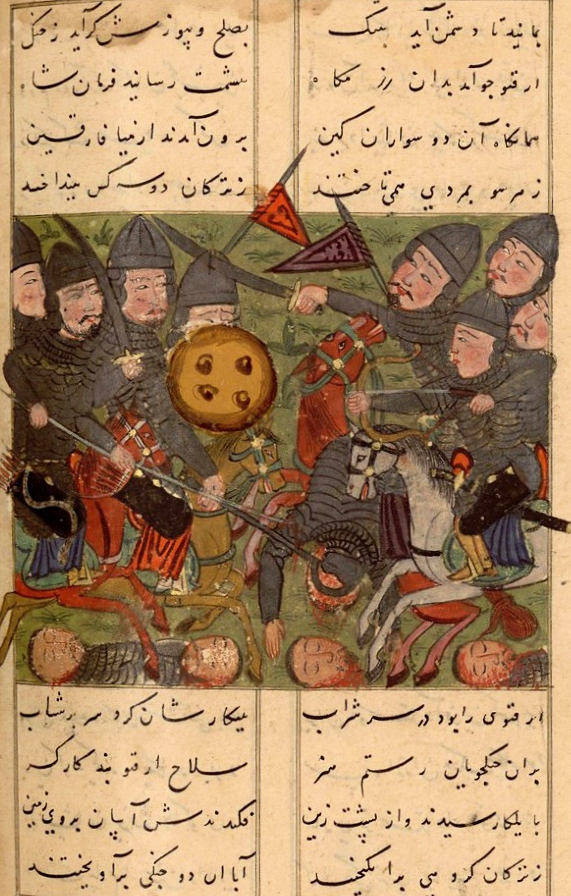
- Battle of Mayyafaraqin (1259) headed by Yoshmut; Shams al-Dîn Kâshânî, 15th century

Viceroy of Arran and Azerbaijan
- Tenure: 1265 - 1271
- Born: after 1234; Mongolia
- Died: July 18, 1271 (aged 36–37)
- House: Borjigin
- Father: Hulagu
- Mother: Nogachin Aghachi

Yoshmut (Persian: يوشموت) was an Ilkhanate prince and one of the eldest sons of Hulagu. According to Dai Matsui and Daniel King, his name was of Christian Uyghur origin and ultimately derived from the Sogdian word "ʿywšmbt" (cognate with Persian: دوشنبه, romanized: Dushanbah, lit. 'Monday').

== Life ==
He was born to Hulagu and his concubine Nogachin Aghachi, a lady of Chinese of Khitan origin from camp of Qutui Khatun in Mongolia. One of the three eldest sons of Hulagu, he accompanied his father with Abaqa in his Nizari campaign in Persia from 1253.

== Under Hulagu ==
His first assignment was subjugation of Mayyafaraqin with Sontai Noyan and Ilga Noyan of Jalairs in 1259 after Hulagu's conquest of Diyar Bakr. However Ayyubid malik of the city al-Kamil Muhammad resisted Yoshmut for a while, despite reinforcements from Mosul sent by Badr al-Din Lu'lu'. This angered Hulagu who recalled Yoshmut after 10 months. City held until April 1260 when al-Kamil finally surrendered to Mongol army. Turned over to Hulagu's camp in Tell Bashir, al-Kamil was forced to eat his own flesh. After Mayyafaraqin, Yoshmut was sent to Mardin, which was ruled by Artuqid bey Al-Sa'id Najm al-Din Ghazi I. Mardin resisted the siege for over 8 months until death of Najm al-Din. New bey Qara Arslan surrendered castle to Yoshmut and accepted Ilkhanate overlordship. Nevertheless, angry Hulagu reprimanded Yoshmut for his inability and banned him from the army that was going to battle Golden Horde in 1262. Despite all, before his death in 1265, Hulagu appointed his sons Abaqa to viceroyalty of Khorasan and Yoshmut to Azerbaijan, Arran, Shirvan and in general march of Derbent. Yoshmut arrived at Derbent on 16 February 1265, a week after his father's death.

== Under Abaqa ==
Hearing news of his father's death, Yoshmut rushed to capital, unsuccessfully campaigning for kurultai but losing hope returning to Derbent after 2 days. In turn, Abaqa reaffirmed his position in Derbent on 19 June 1265, on day of his coronation. After Abaqa's election, Ilkhanate faced another invasion by Golden Horde. Yoshmut fought with Golden Horde commander Nogai on banks of Aqsu river in Shirvan on 19–20 July 1265 and managed to shoot him in the eye after a fierce battle, forcing him to retreat. Abaqa pursued Nogai's army across the Kur, hoping to wipe it out, but Abaqa was forced to withdraw when Berke arrived with reinforcements.

Yoshmut participated in his brother's war with 10.000 soldiers in 1270 against Chagatai khan Baraq, who was threatening Ilkhanate borders. While Abaqa was dealing with Tegüder in west, Yoshmut battled with Baraq, often faced with defeats. After Abaqa's arrival on vicinity of Herat, he was given command of left flank with Arghun Aqa, Atabeg Yusufshah of Yazd, Muzaffar al-Din Hajjaj, Sontai Noyan, Buriltai Noyan, Shiktur Noyan and Abdallah Aqa commanding under him. Battle was won after three assaults on 22 July 1270 and resulted with Baraq's flee.

== Death and legacy ==
Yoshmut died on 18 July 1271. He was known for his hot temper and unpopularity among military. One of his descendants - Ilyas - became a figurehead Ilkhan with the regnal name Suleiman Khan.

== Family ==
He had at least four sons:

1. Qara Noqai — took part in Nawruz's revolt, executed by Arghun on 7 Oct 1289 with his children in Damghan.
2. Sogai — executed by Ghazan in 1296 for Sulamish's revolt in Anatolia.
  1. Yusufshah
    1. Ilyas
3. Janbu — died on 31 December 1291, on Jaghatu plains

Another son of Yoshmut was attested in Turkish sources named Jumudar (Ottoman Turkish: جمود, romanized: Cumudâr). His mummified body was found in Amasya and his death was dated to 1296, Ghazan's reign. It is being displayed in Amasya Museum.
