= Artuq Arslan =

Artuqid ruler of Mardin from 1200 to 1239

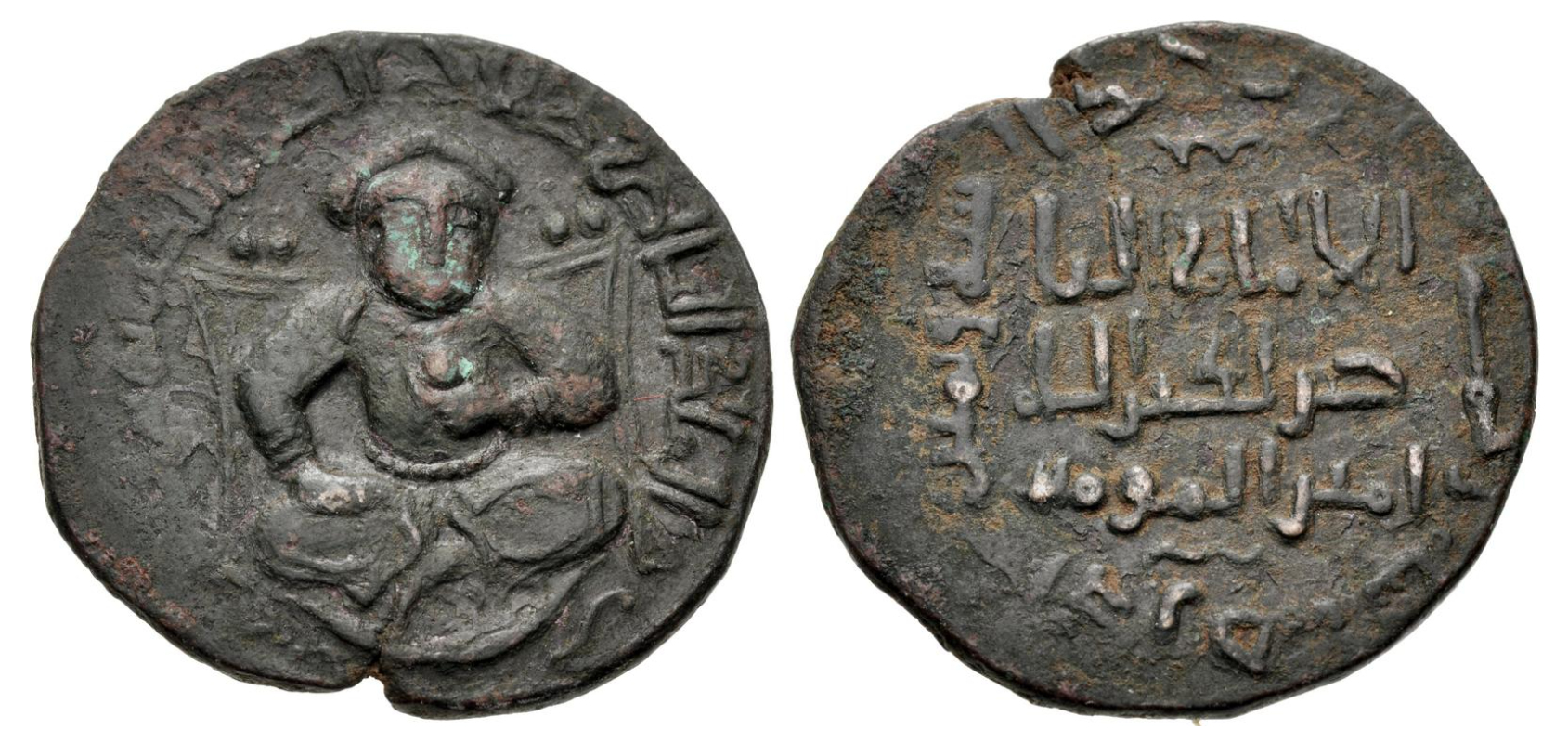
- Artuqids of Mardin. Nasir al-Din Artuq Arslan. 1200-1239 CE Mardin mint. Dated 1237-8 CE. Obverse: Male figure seated facing with legs crossed, resting right hand on thigh and holding globe in left; name and titles of the Seljuk overlord around. Reverse: Legend in five lines citing the Abbasid Caliph al-Mustansir and Artuq Arslan; mint and date in margins.

Emir of Mardin
- Reign: 1200-1239
- Predecessor: Yuluq Arslan
- Successor: Al-Sa'id Najm al-Din Ghazi I
- Issue: Al-Sa'id Najm al-Din Ghazi I
- House: Artuqids
- Father: Yuluq Arslan

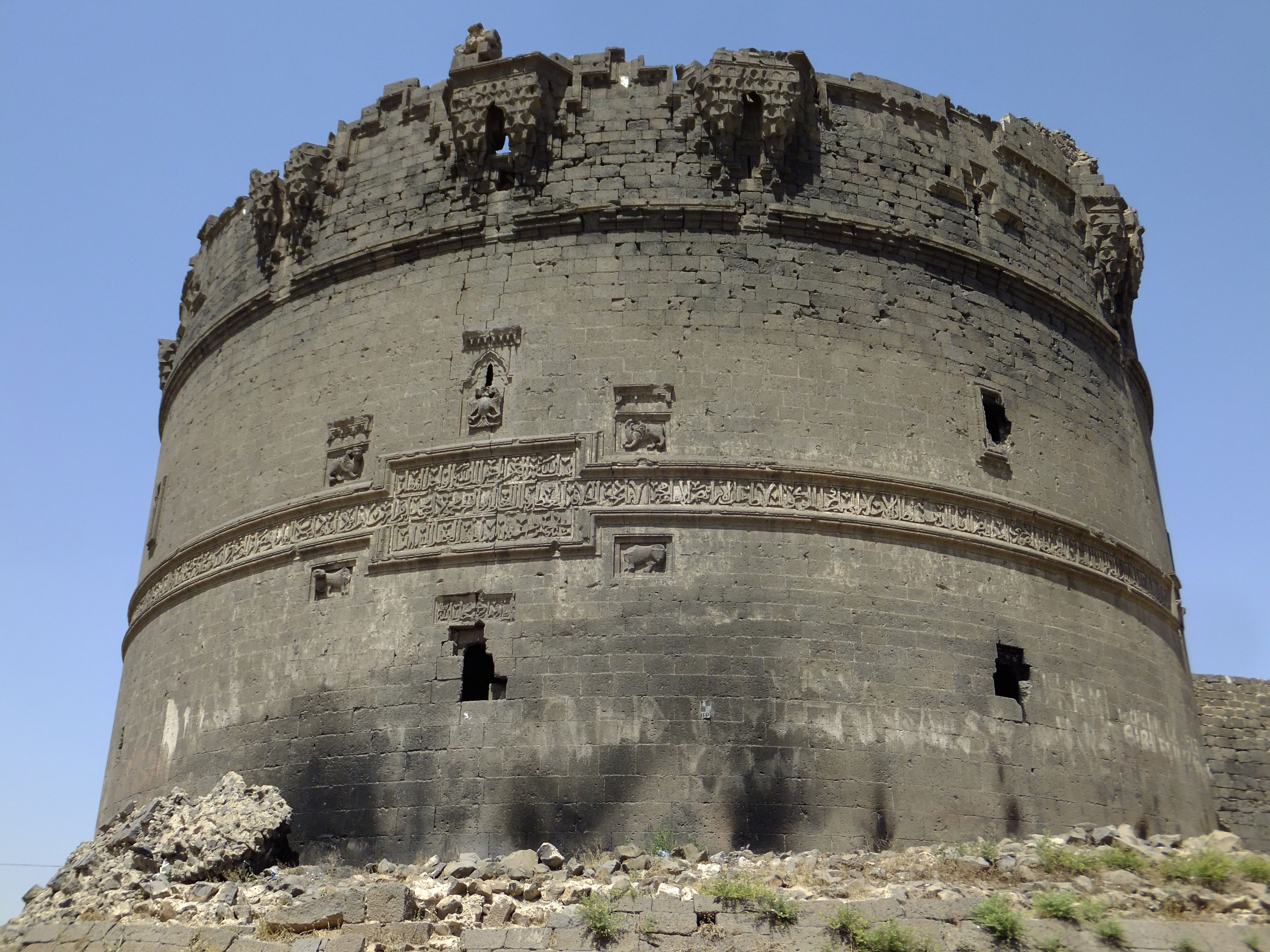
The Evli Beden or Ulu Beden Tower in the southern city walls of Amid, built in 1208 during the Artuqid period by Nasir al-Din Artuq Arslan, whose name appears in the inscription.

Nasir al-Din Artuq Arslan (ruled 1200–1239) was a ruler of the Artuqids of Mardin. The "Mardin branch" of the Artuqids ruled in Mardin and Mayyafariqin from 1101 to 1409, and were primarily descendants of Ilghazi and his brother Alp-Yaruq. His predecessor was his father Yuluq Arslan.

On the reverse of his coins dated AH 628 (1230 CE), Artuq Arslan inscribed the names of two overlords, the Abbasid Caliph al-Mustansir and the Ayyubid ruler al-Kamil. At that time, in 1229, the Ayyubids were allied with various Turkomans, including Artuq Aslan, in order to repel the offensive of the exiled Khwarazmian ruler Jalal al-Din from his base in Iranian Azerbaijan. They defeated Jalal al-Din and his Artuqid ally Rukhun al-Din Mawud (cousin of Artuq Aslan) in 1230.

The Ayyubids continued their expansion into Diyarbakr by attacking the Artuqid ruler Rukn al-Dīn Mawdūd (r.1222–1232/33) in his territories of Hisn Kayfa and Amid in 1231-1232. Around 1234, Artuq Aslan changed his allegiance to the Seljuk Rums, fearing further Ayyubid expansion into his territory of Mardin. The Ayyubids were defeated by the Seljuk Rums ruler Kayqubad I in 1234. The Ayyubids ceased their hostilities towards the Seljuks when they learnt of the Mongol invasion of Jazira from the east.

The lands of the Artukid dynasty fell to the Mongol invasion sometime between 1235 and 1243. The Artuqids submitted to Mongol khan Hülegü and continued to govern as vassals of the Mongol Empire.

He was succeeded by his brother Al-Sa'id Najm al-Din Ghazi I.
