= As-Salih Shams al-Din Mahmūd =

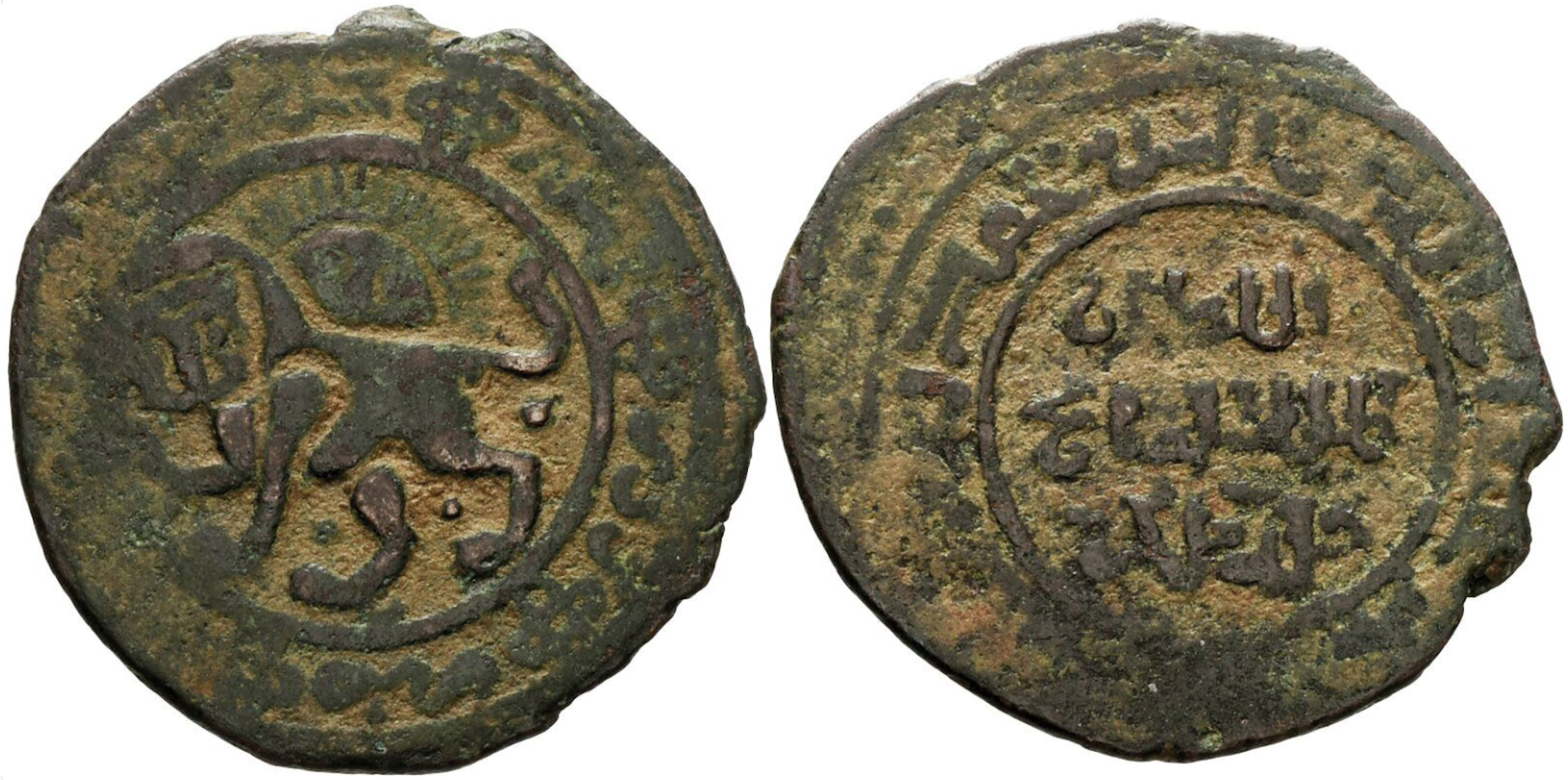
- Coinage of Al-Salih Salih I (r.1312-1364). Mardin mint, dated AH 747 (1346–7). Lion walking left, sunface behind.

Emir of Mardin
- Reign: 1312-1364
- Predecessor: Al-Mansur Najm al-Din Ghazi II
- Successor: Al-Mansur Husam al-Din Ahmad
- Issue: Al-Mansur Husam al-Din Ahmad; Al-Muzaffar Fakhr al-Din Dāwūd II
- House: Artuqids
- Father: Al-Mansur Najm al-Din Ghazi II

As-Salih Shams al-Din Mahmūd (r.1312-1364) was a son of the Artuqid ruler of Mardin Al-Mansur Najm al-Din Ghazi II (r.1294-1312). He ruled Mardin after his brother 'Ali Alpï II (r. 1312), from 1312 to 1364.

As-Salih Shams al-Din Mahmūd remained under Mongol Il-khanid rule following the Mongol siege of Mardin in 1260, when the Mardin line of Artuqid rulers submitted to Hulegu.

He ruled a second time in 1367, after the reign of his first son Al-Mansur Husam al-Din Ahmad, (r.1364–1367).

Coins minted in Mardin in the Middle Ages during the city's rule by the Artuqid dynasty and the Mongol Empire are noted for prominently incorporating solar iconography, both in the form of the Lion and Sun emblem but also in the form of just the sun alone.

He had two sons who succeeded him in turn:

- Al-Mansur Husam al-Din Ahmad, (r.1364–1367)
- Al-Muzaffar Fakhr al-Din Dāwūd II (r.1367–1376)

The Mardin branch of the Artuqids were to fall under the Qara Qoyunlu ruler Qara Mahammad, as he invaded Mardin in 1384 and received the submission of its Artuqid ruler Majd al-Din Isa Al-Zahir (1376–1407). From this point onwards, the Artuqids operated as a vassal state of the Qara Qoyunlu. The Qara Qoyunlu under Qara Yusuf captured Mardin and finally put an end to Artuqid rule in 1409.

== Sources ==
- Bosworth, Clifford Edmund (2004). The New Islamic Dynasties: A Chronological and Genealogical Manual. Edinburgh University Press. ISBN 0-7486-2137-7.
