= Al-Mansur Najm al-Din Ghazi II =

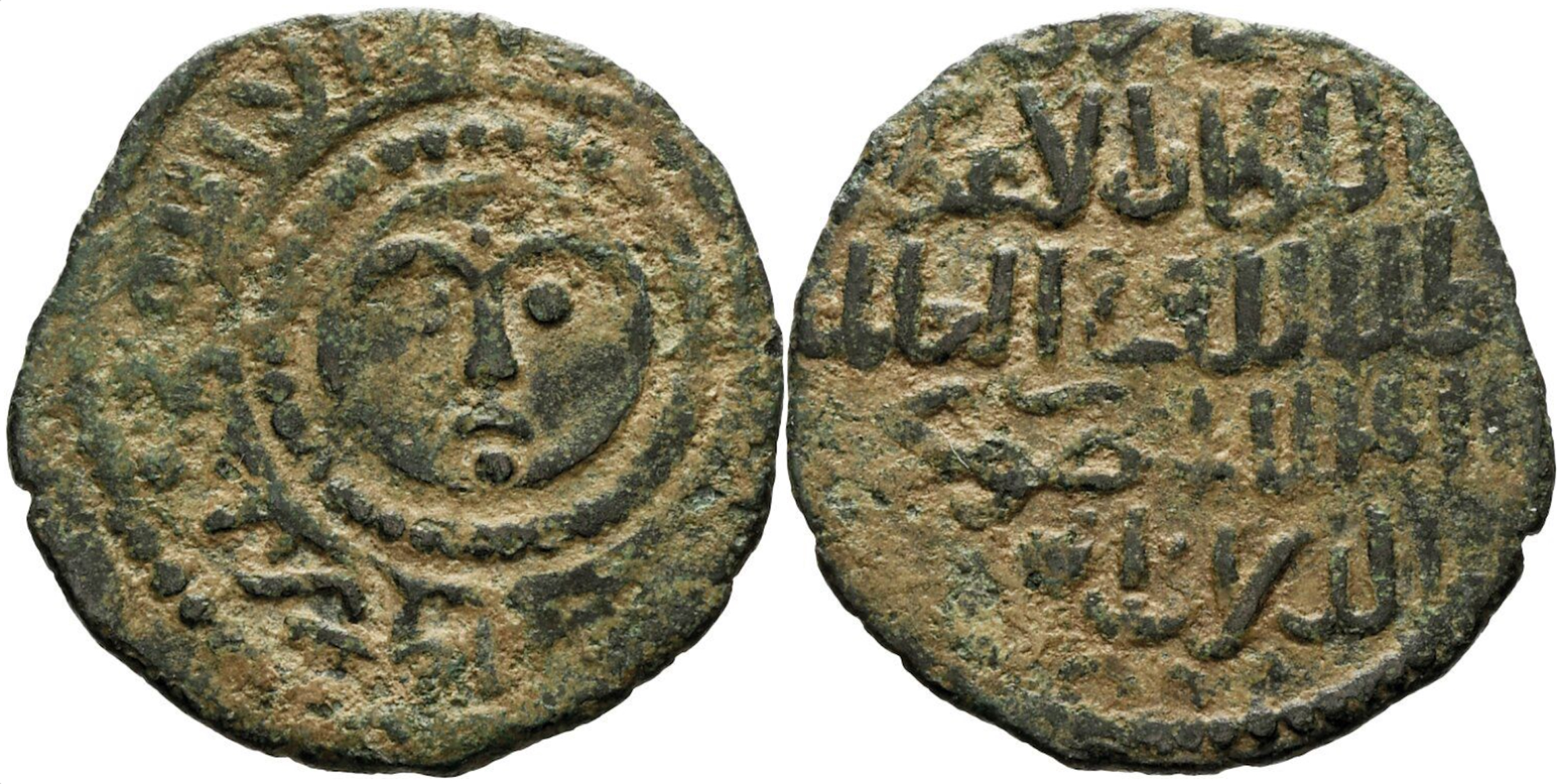
- Coinage of Najm al-Din Ghazi II, Mardin. Round face within circle.

Emir of Mardin
- Reign: 1294-1312
- Predecessor: Al-Sa'id Shams al-Din Dāwūd I
- Successor: 'Ali Alpï II
- Issue: 'Ali Alpï II; As-Salih Shams al-Din Mahmūd
- House: Artuqids
- Father: Al-Muzaffar Fakhr al-Din Kara Arslan

Al-Mansur Najm al-Din Ghazi II (r.1294-1312) was a son of the Artuqid ruler of Mardin Al-Muzaffar Fakhr al-Din Kara Arslan (r. 1260–1292). He ruled Mardin after his brother Al-Sa'id Shams al-Din Dāwūd I (r.1292–1294), from 1294 to 1312.

Al-Mansur Najm al-Din Ghazi II remained under Mongol Il-khanid rule following the Mongol siege of Mardin in 1260, when the Mardin line of Artuqid rulers submitted to Hulegu.

Coins minted in Mardin in the Middle Ages during the city's rule by the Artuqid dynasty and the Mongol Empire are noted for prominently incorporating solar iconography, both in the form of the Lion and Sun emblem but also in the form of just the sun alone.

He had two sons who succeeded him in turn:

- 'Ali Alpï II (r. 1312)
- As-Salih Shams al-Din Mahmūd (r.1312–1364)

== Sources ==
- Bosworth, Clifford Edmund (2004). The New Islamic Dynasties: A Chronological and Genealogical Manual. Edinburgh University Press. ISBN 0-7486-2137-7.
