= Yuluq Arslan =

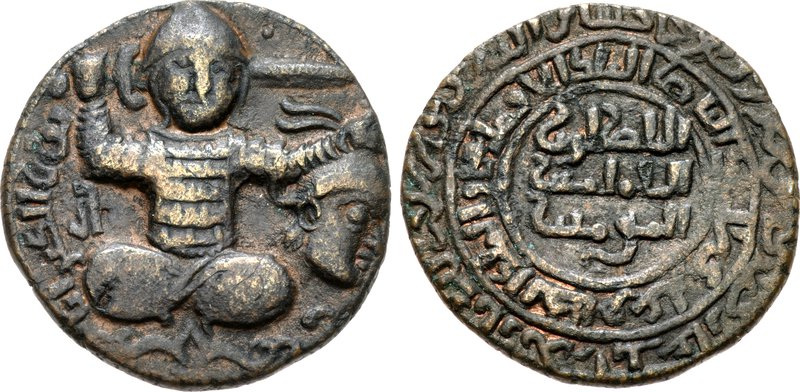
- Coinage of Husam al-Din Yuluq Arslan (1184–1200) probably Mardin mint. Dated AH 596 (1199–1200 CE). Obverse: Turk, in military outfit and cross legged, seated facing, holding severed head and raised sword; name and title of Nur al-Din Arslan Shah to left; ornamental scrollwork in exergue. Reverse: Name and titles of Abbasid caliph in three lines; names and titles of Ayyubid overlord in inner margin; name of Husam al-Din Yuluq Arslan and AH date in outer margin.

Emir of Mardin
- Reign: 1200-1239
- Predecessor: Ilghazi II
- Successor: Artuq Arslan
- Issue: Artuq Arslan; Al-Sa'id Najm al-Din Ghazi I
- House: Artuqids
- Father: Ilghazi II

Husam al-Din Yuluq Arslan (r.1184–1204) was an Artuqid dynasty ruler of the regions of Mardin and Mayyafariqin.

Some of his coinage displays an armoured Turk ruler holding a severed head in his left hand. The obverse contains the name "Nur al-Din Atabeg", a likely allusion to his contemporary Nur al-Din Arslan Shah, although it remains unclear why he would show the effigy of his rival from Mossul. The reverse acknowledges the religious affiliation to the Abbasid caliph.

Yuluq Arslan was a vassal of Saladin. When Saladin died in 1193, he issued a coin showing four women mourning the death of Saladin.

He was succeeded by his son Artuq Arslan.

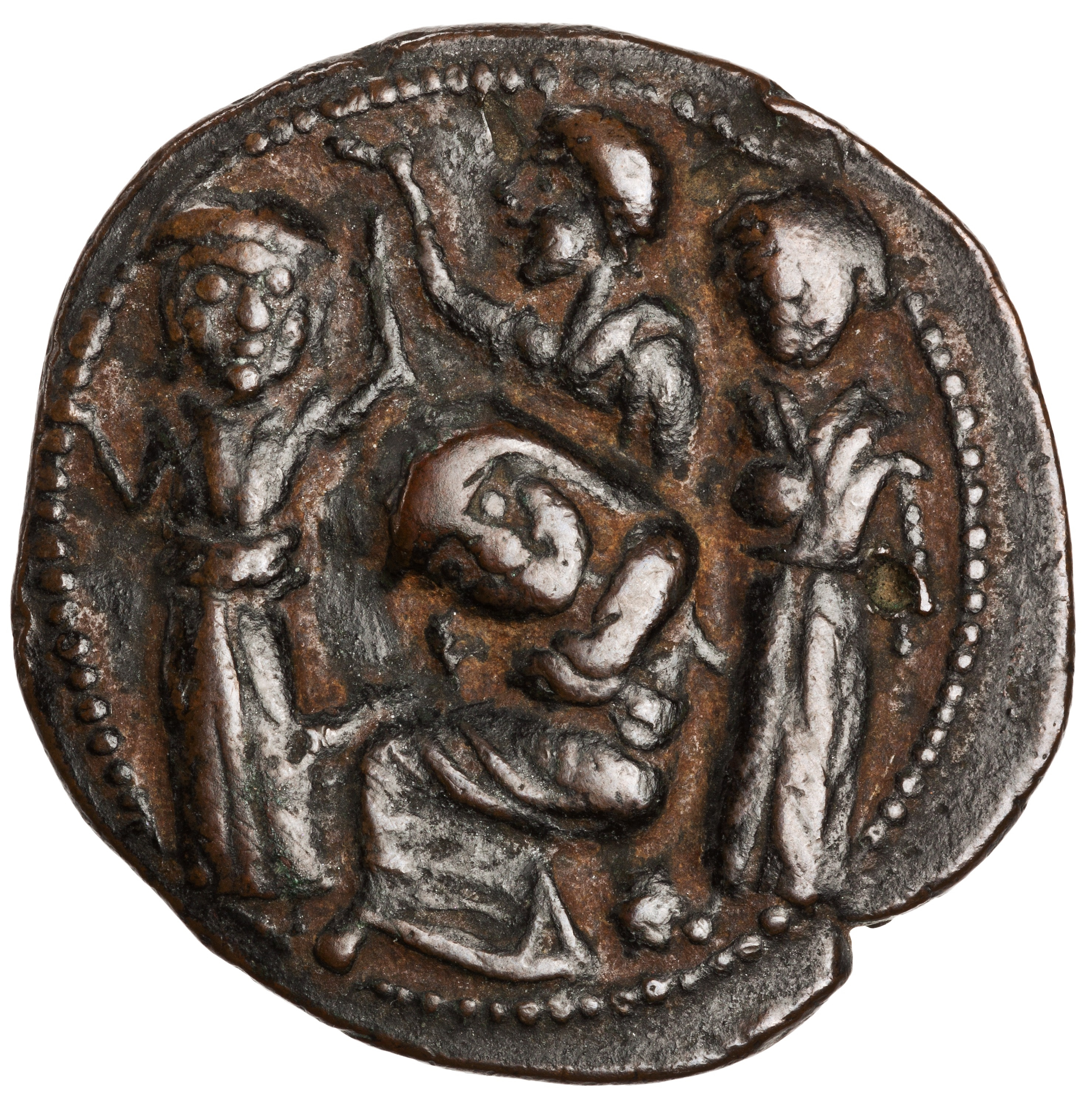
Four women mourning the death of Saladin, on a coin of Husam al-Din Yuluq Arslan, a vassal of Saladin, 589 H (1193 CE).

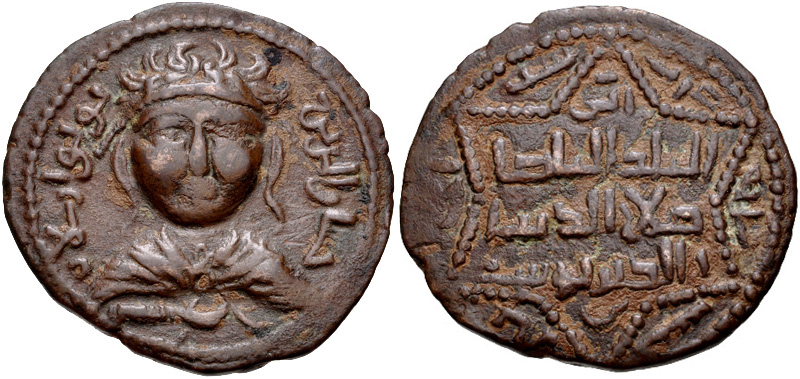
Coinage of Husam al-Din Yuluq Arslan. AH 580–597 (AD 1184–1200) Dated AH 582 (AD 1186–7). Diademed and draped half-length facing male bust.
