= Artuqids =

Medieval Turkoman dynasty

Artuqid State Artuklu Beyliği
- 1102–1409
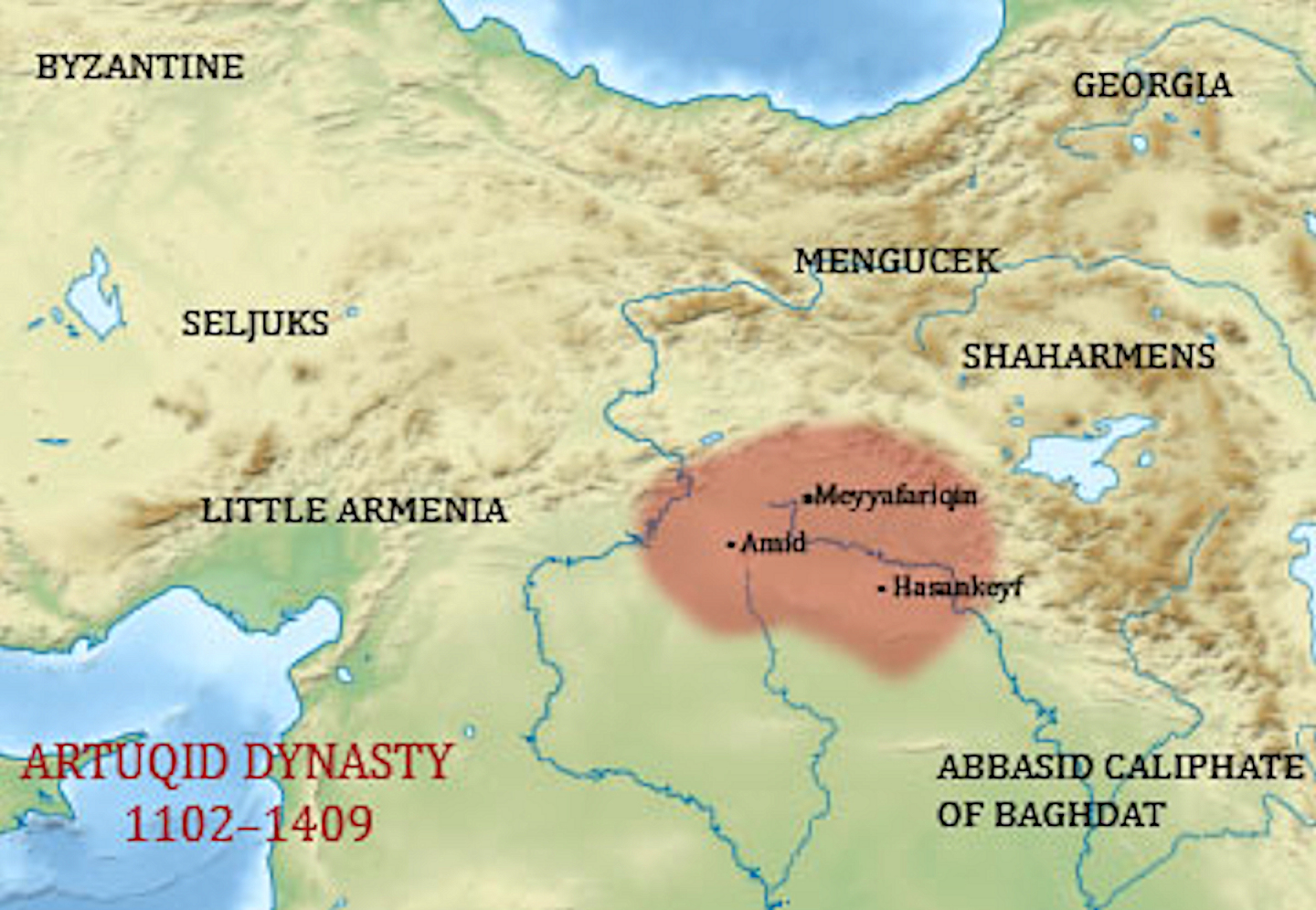
- Capital: Hasankeyf, Diyarbakır, Harput, Nisibin, Mardin, in chronological order
- Common languages: Oghuz Turkic (nomads, military elite, rulers).; Arabic (administrative, literary). (Note: "Society, language and culture in the age of the Seljuqs and their successors (...) The Turkish language did not spread beyond the nomads, the military elite, and the rulers. Instead, the Turkish elite increasingly came to be at home in Arabic and/or Persian. (...) In the Jazira and Syria, the Zangids and Artuqids used Arabic as their administrative and literary language, whereas Syriac (an Aramaic dialect) was favored among the Christian population and was also important as a medium for the transmission of scholarship books into Arabic."); Syriac (Christian populations).
- Religion: Sunni Islam
- Bey
- History
  - Establishment: 1102
  - Takeover by Zengid Dynasty (Aleppo): 1127
  - Vassal of the Ayyubid Sultanate (Hasenkeyf): 1232
  - Takeover by Sultanate of Rum (Harput): 1234
  - Annexation by Qara Qoyunlu (Mardin): 1409
- Currency: Akçe (after 1300), Dirhem
| Preceded by | Succeeded by |
| Seljuk Empire; Marwanids (Diyar Bakr) | Qara Qoyunlu |
- Today part of: Syria; Turkey

The Artuqid dynasty (alternatively Artukid, Ortoqid, or Ortokid; Turkish: Artuklu Beyliği, Artuklular, pl. Artukoğulları) was established in 1102 as a Turkish principality of the Seljuk Empire. It formed a Turkoman dynasty rooted in the Oghuz Döger tribe, and followed the Sunni Muslim faith. (Note: The Artuqids, descendants of Artuq b. Ekseb, were a Turkmen dynasty established in Diyarbakr...) (Note: "Artuqids. Turkmen dynasty which reigned over....") It ruled in Northern Syria and Upper Mesopotamia in the eleventh through thirteenth centuries. The Artuqid dynasty took its name from its founder, Artuk Bey, who was a member of Döger branch of the Oghuz Turks and ruled one of the Turkmen principalities of the Seljuk Empire. Artuk's sons and descendants ruled the three branches in the region: Sökmen's descendants ruled the region around Hasankeyf between 1102 and 1231; Ilghazi's branch ruled from Mardin and Mayyafariqin between 1106 and 1186 (until 1409 as vassals) and Aleppo from 1117–1128; and the Harput line starting in 1112 under the Sökmen branch, and was independent between 1185 and 1233.

== History ==
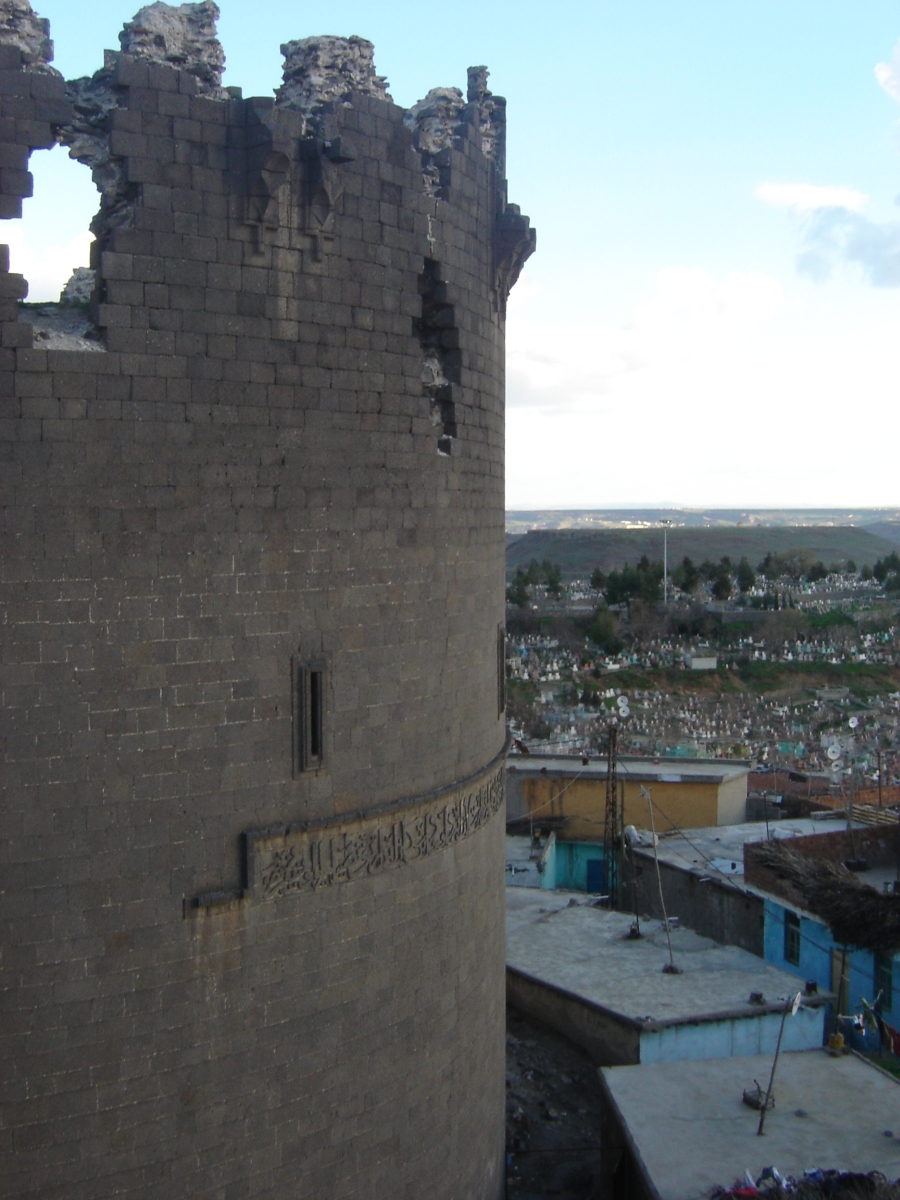
City walls of Diyarbakır.

The dynasty was founded by Artuk, son of Eksük, a general originally under Malik-Shah I and then under the Seljuk emir of Damascus, Tutush I. Tutush appointed Artuk governor of Jerusalem in 1086. Artuk died in 1091, and was succeeded by his sons Sökmen and Ilghazi who were expelled from Jerusalem by the Fatimid vizier al-Afdal Shahanshah in 1098; the Fatimids lost the city to the Crusaders the following year after the siege of Jerusalem of 1099.

Sökmen and Ilghazi established themselves in Diyarbakır, Mardin, and Hasankeyf in al-Jazira where they came into conflict with the Seljuk sultanate. Sökmen, bey of Mardin, defeated the Crusaders at the Battle of Harran in 1104. Ilghazi succeeded Sökmen in Mardin and imposed his control over Aleppo at the request of the qadi Ibn al-Khashshab in 1118. The next year, Ilghazi defeated the Crusader state Principality of Antioch at the Battle of Ager Sanguinis of 1119.

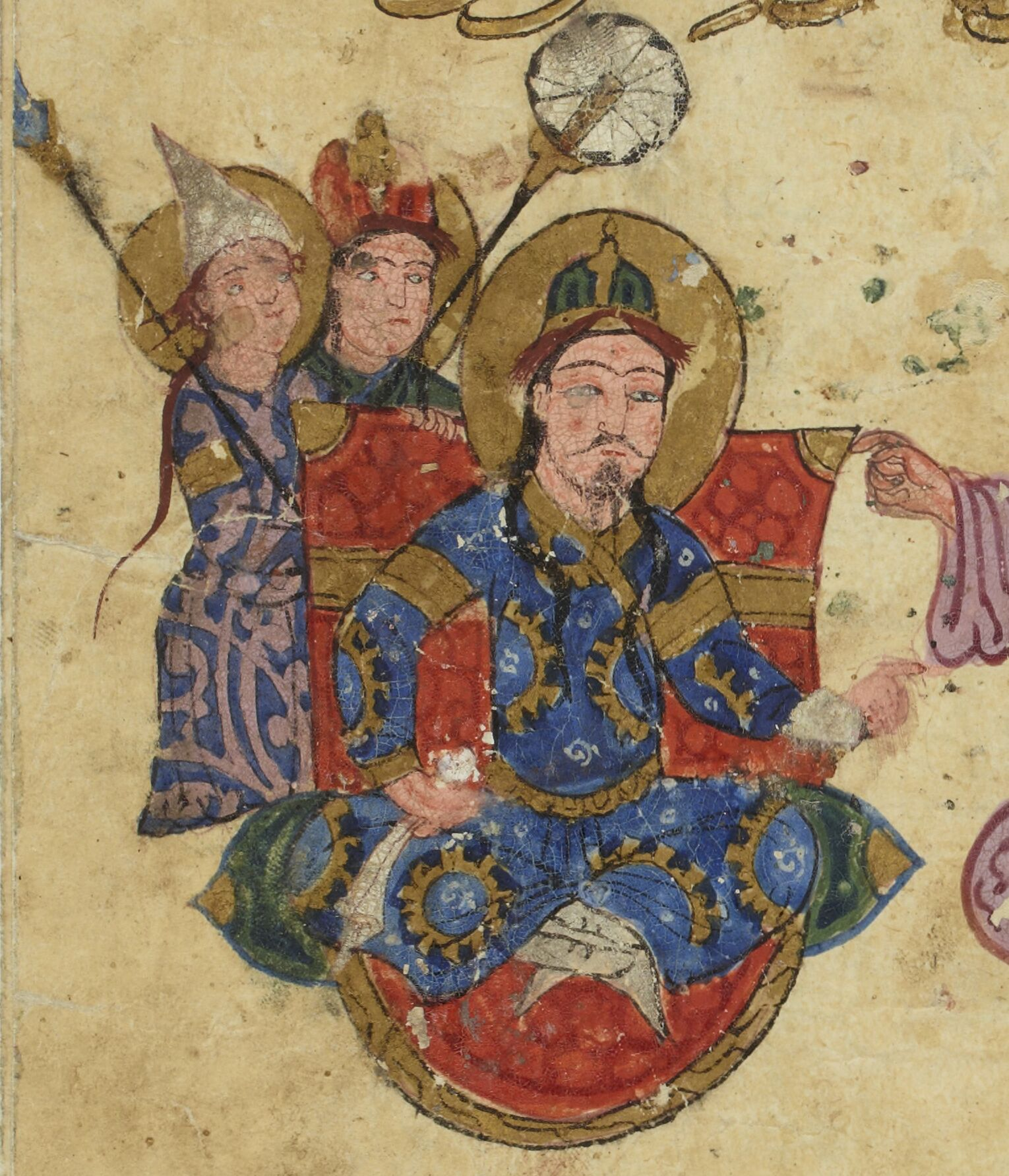
The "Sheikh" of Diyarbakır in Turkic dress, wearing the sharbūsh with tall cap. Picture from Maqamat 43 "Encounter at Al-Bakriya" . "Al-Bakriya" = Diyar Bakr, Painted in Amid, modern-day Diyarbakır, Turkey, ca. 1200–1210, probably Artukid (Maqamat al-Hariri, BNF Arabe 3929).

After pillaging the County of Edessa, Ilghazi made peace with the Crusaders. In 1121, he went north towards Armenia with his son-in-law Mazyad Dubais II ibn Sadaqah and Sultan Malik of Ganja. Ilghazi invaded Georgia and was defeated by David IV of Georgia at the Battle of Didgori of 1121. Ilghazi died in 1122, and although his nephew Belek Ghazi nominally controlled Aleppo, the city was really controlled by ibn al-Khashshab. Ibn al-Kashshab was murdered by Assassins in 1125, and Aleppo fell under the control of Zengi, atabeg of Mosul, in 1128. After the death of Belek Ghazi, the Artuqids were split between Harput, Hasankeyf and Mardin. Sokman's son Rukn al-Dawla Dāʾūd, bey of Hasankeyf, died in 1144, and was succeeded by his son Kara Aslan. Kara Aslan allied with Joscelin II of Edessa against the Zengids, and while Joscelin was away in 1144, Zengi recaptured Edessa, the first of the Crusader states to fall (see Siege of Edessa). The Artuqids became vassals of the Zengids during the reign of Nur al-Din Zengi (r. 1146–1174), (Note: "The rise of the Zangids halted the Artuqids' expansionist plans, and they had to become vassals of Nur al-Din. Then the Ayyubids whittled their power down further, and they lost Hisn Kayfa, Amid and Mayyafariqin to them. In the early thirteenth century, they were for a time vassals of the Rum Seljuqs and of the Khwarazm Shah Jalal al-Dln Mengiibirti. Eventually, only the Mardin line survived, with Qara Arslan submitting to the Mongol II Khan Hulegu.") supporting the Zengids at the battle of Artah in 1164.

Kara Aslan's son Nūr al-Dīn Muḥammad allied with the Ayyubid sultan Saladin against Kilij Arslan II, Seljuk sultan of Rûm, whose daughter had married Nur ad-Din Muhammad. In the peace settlement with Kilij Arslan II, Saladin gained control of the Artuqid territory, even though the Artuqids were still technically vassals of Mosul, which Saladin did not control. The Seljuk Empire completely disintegrated soon after that in 1194.

The Artuqid dynasty remained in nominal command of al-Jazira, but their power declined under Ayyubid rule. The Hasankeyf branch conquered Diyarbakır in 1198 and its center was moved here, but was demolished by the Ayyubids in 1231 when it attempted to form an alliance with the Seljuks. The Harput branch was destroyed by the Sultanate of Rum due to following a slippery policy between the Ayyubids and Seljuks. The Mardin branch survived for longer, but as a vassal of the Ayyubids, Sultanate of Rûm, Il-Khanate, Timurids and the Qara Qoyunlu. Qara Arslan (r.1260–1292), ruler of Mardin, submitted to the Mongol Hulegu. Qara Qoyunlu ruler Qara Mahammad invaded Mardin in 1384 and received the submission of its Artuqid ruler Majd al-Din Isa Al-Zahir (1376-1407). From this point onwards, the Artuqids operated as a vassal state of the Qara Qoyunlu. The Qara Qoyunlu captured Mardin and finally put an end to Artuqid rule in 1409.

== Art ==
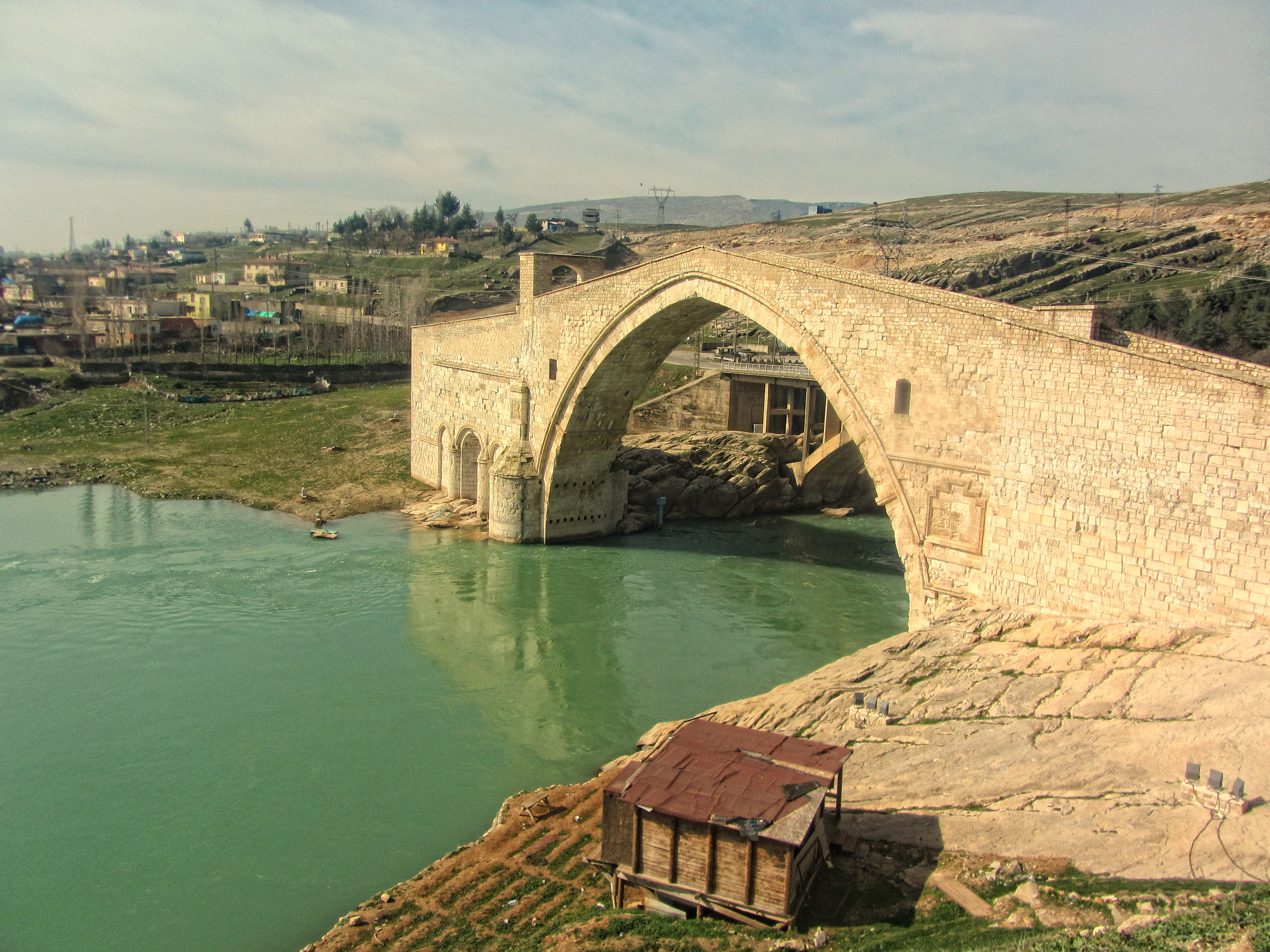
Malabadi Bridge was built by the Artuqids.

Despite their constant preoccupation with war, members of the Artuqid dynasty left many architectural monuments. Artuqid rulers commissioned many public buildings, such as mosques, bazaars, bridges, hospitals and baths for the benefit of their subjects. They left an important cultural heritage by contributing to literature and the art of metalworking. The door and door handles of the great Mosque of Cizre are unique examples of Artuqid metal working craftsmanship, which can be seen in the Turkish and Islamic Arts Museum in Istanbul, Turkey.

They made the most significant additions to Diyarbakır City Walls. Urfa Gate was rebuilt by Muhammad, son of Kara Arslan. In the same area of the western wall, south of Urfa Gate, two imposing towers, Ulu Beden and Yedi Kardeş were commissioned in 1208 by the Artuqid ruler Nāṣir al-Dīn Maḥmūd who designed the Yedi Kardeş tower himself and apposed the Artuqid double-headed eagle on its walls.

A large caravanserai in Mardin as well as the civil engineering feat of Malabadi Bridge are still in regular use in our day. The partially standing Old Bridge, Hasankeyf, was built in 1116 by Kara Arslan.

The Great Mosques of Mardin and Silvan were possibly but in any case considerably developed over the 12th century by several Artuqid rulers on the basis of existing Seljuk edifices. The congregational mosque of Dunaysir (now Kızıltepe) was commissioned by Yülük Arslan (1184–1203) and completed after his death in 1204 by his brother Artuk Arslan (1203–1239).

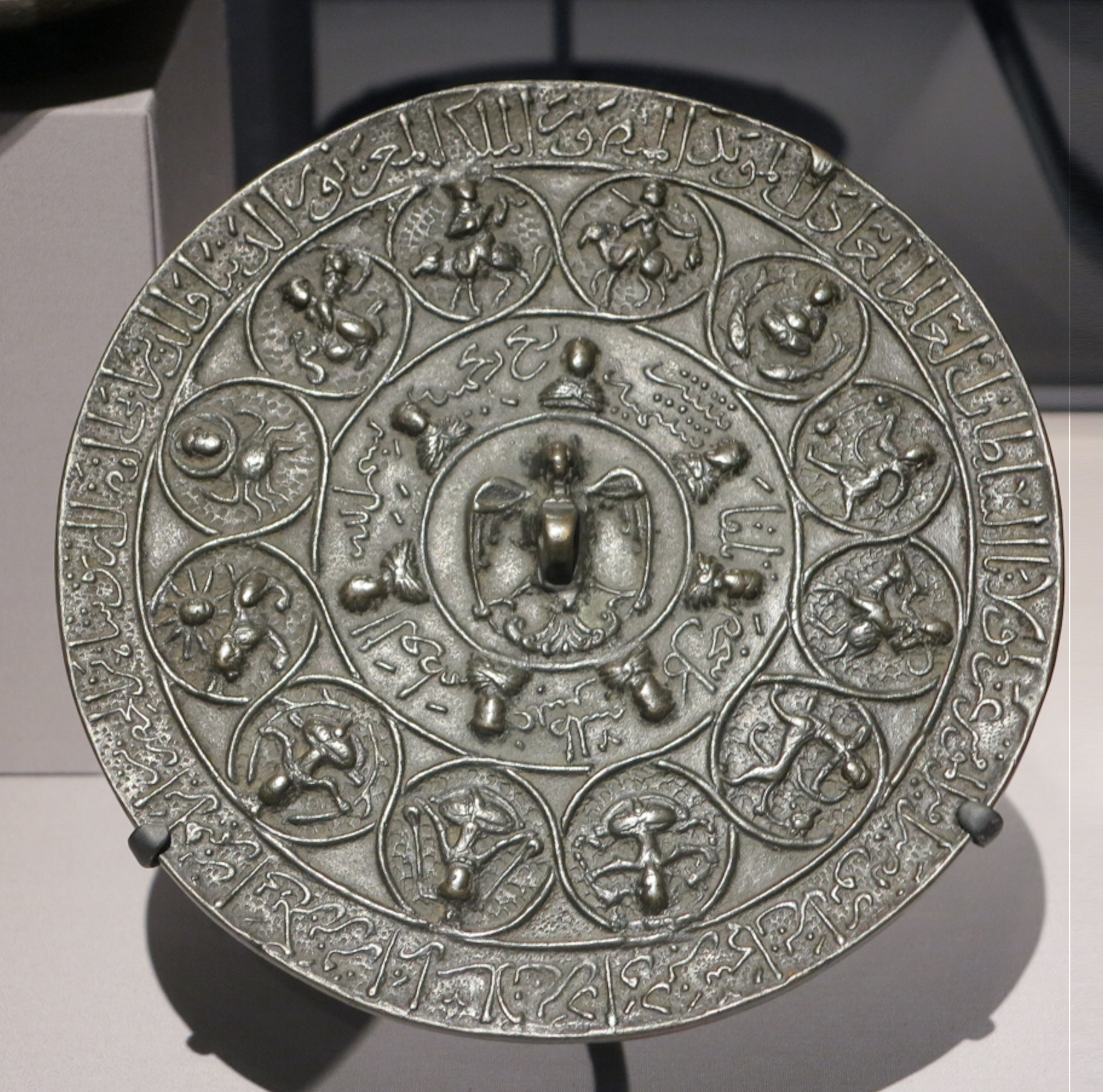
Magic Mirror of Abu-l-Fadl Artuq Shah of Harput, ca. 1220–1230, David Collection. It is "representative of medieval Islamic examples of the “Chinese” type".

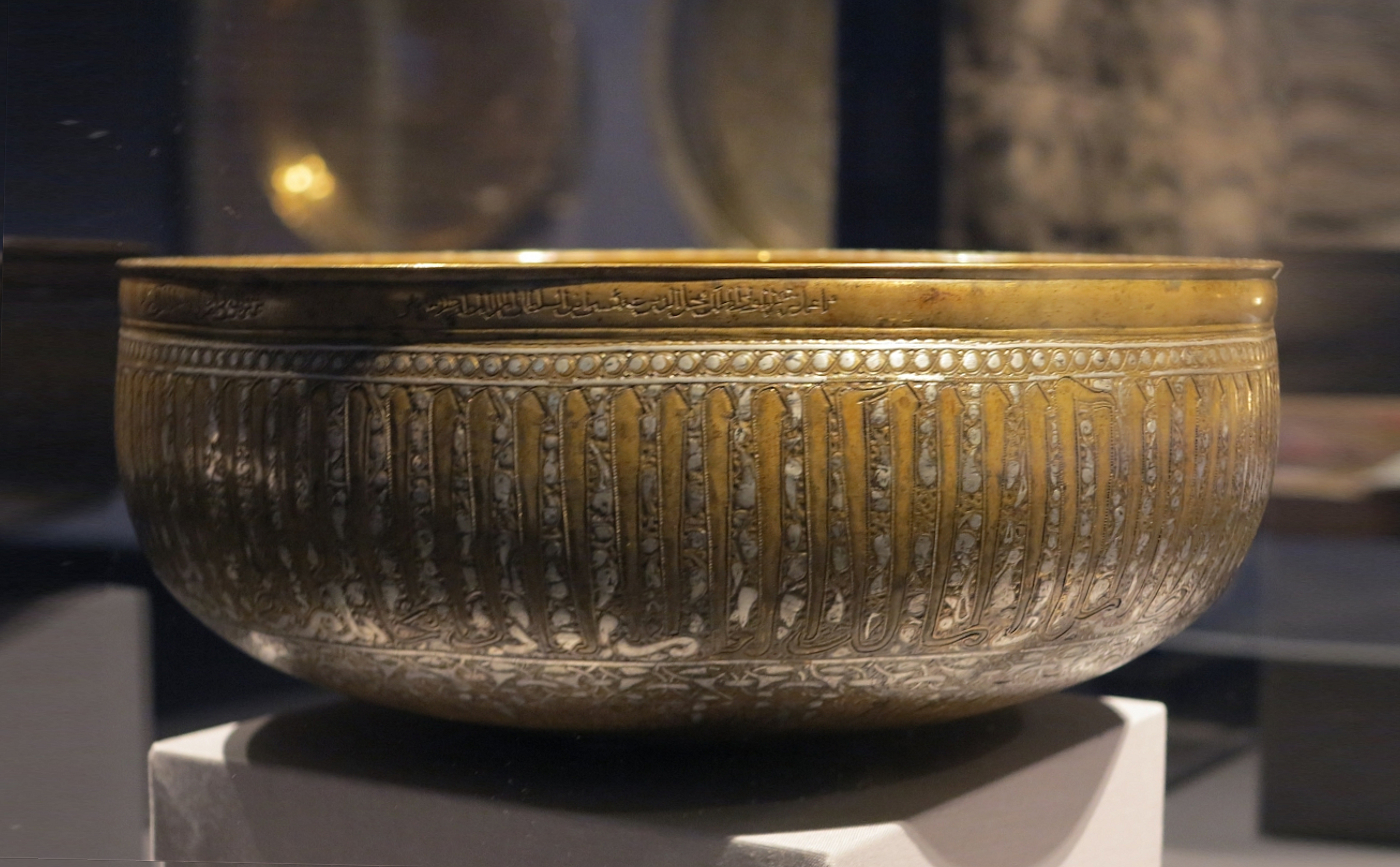
Basin of Sultan Qara Arslan b. Il-Ghazi, Jazira, Syria, or Egypt, late 13th cen. (1289–1292) MIA, Doha.

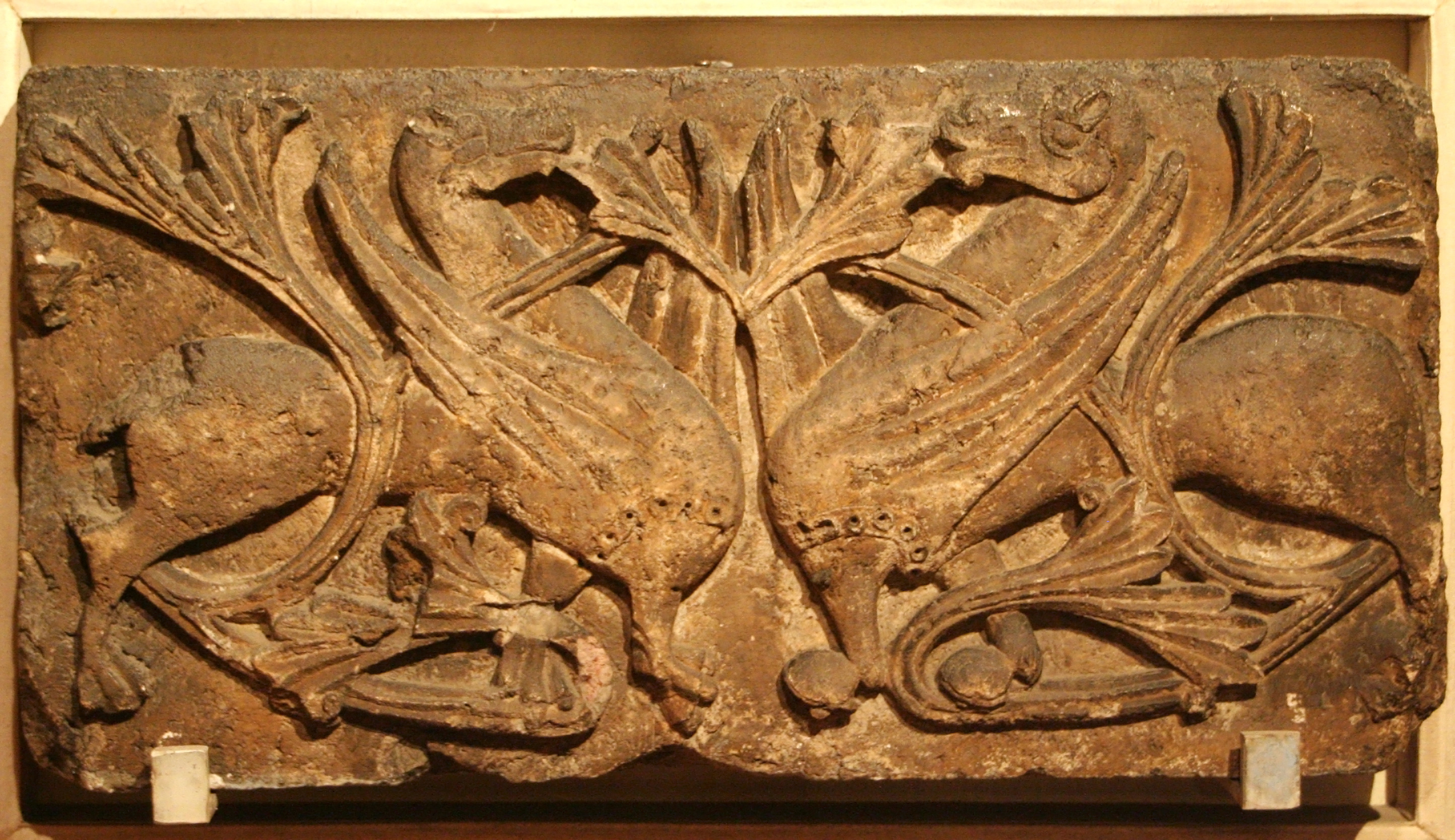
Figurative Architectural Piece Turkish and Islamic Arts Museum, Istanbul

=== Literature ===
The Artuqids are known for their sponsoring of literary works in Arabic. A copy of al-Sufi's book on astronomy The Book of Fixed Stars, a synthesis of Ptolemy's Almagest and Arabic astronomical traditions, was made in 1131 in Artuqid Mardin. Topkapı Palace Museum Library, TSMK, A. 3493 in Kara Arslan (1148–1174 CE) commissioned a new Arabic translation of De Materia Medica by an Arab Christian author named Abu Salim al-Malti, probably from Malatya. Ibn al-Azraq who worked as a mutawalli ishraf al-waqf (Note: Supervisor of charitably endowed property) for the Artuqids, wrote a historical chronicle called, Tarīkh Mayyāfāriqīn, concerning them and the Marwanids and Hamdanids.

The Artuqid ruler Nasr al-Din Mahmud (r. 1201–1222) is known to have commissioned an edition of the Al-Jāmi‘ fī ṣinā‘at al-ḥiyal of Ibn al-Razzaz al-Jazari, devoted to the depiction of mechanical devices, in April 1206 at the Artuqid court (Ahmet III 3472, Topkapı Sarayı Library). The miniatures are thought to reflect various aspects of the Artuqid court at the time. Ibn al-Razzaz al-Jazari was employed at the Artuqid court during the last quarter of the 12th century, and this is the earliest known manuscript of his opus. Many of the figures in the manuscript wear the characteristic Turkic dress, with long coat and boots, and the sharbush headgear (of a special type seen only in Artuqid manuscripts, with a very tall cap behind the headplate and the limited usage of fur around the rim).

An early edition of the Maqamat al-Hariri (Bibliothèque Nationale de France, Arabe 3929) is also considered as probably belonging to the same Artuqid school of painting.

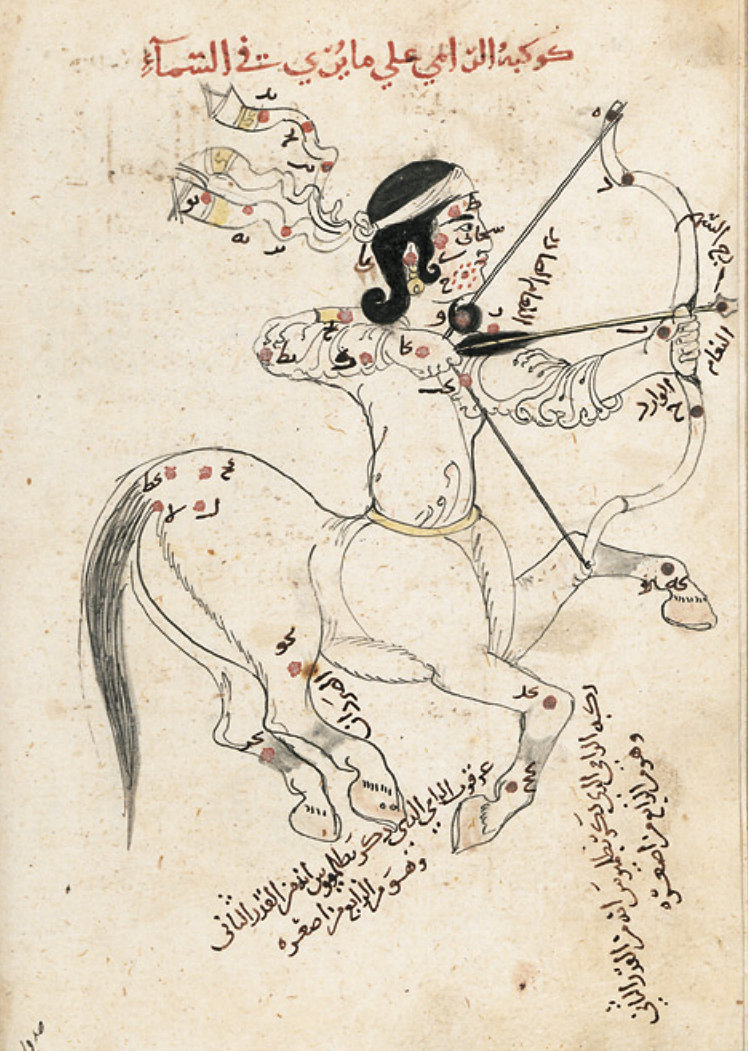
"Sign of Sagittarius" by al-Sufi in his book Ṣuwar al-kawākib al-thābita, Artuqid Mardin, 1131 CE (TSMK, A. 3493).

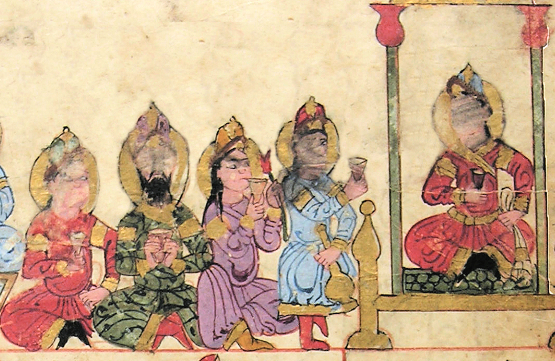
Court scene. Amid, modern-day Diyarbakır, Turkey, 1206 (Ms. Ahmet III 3472).

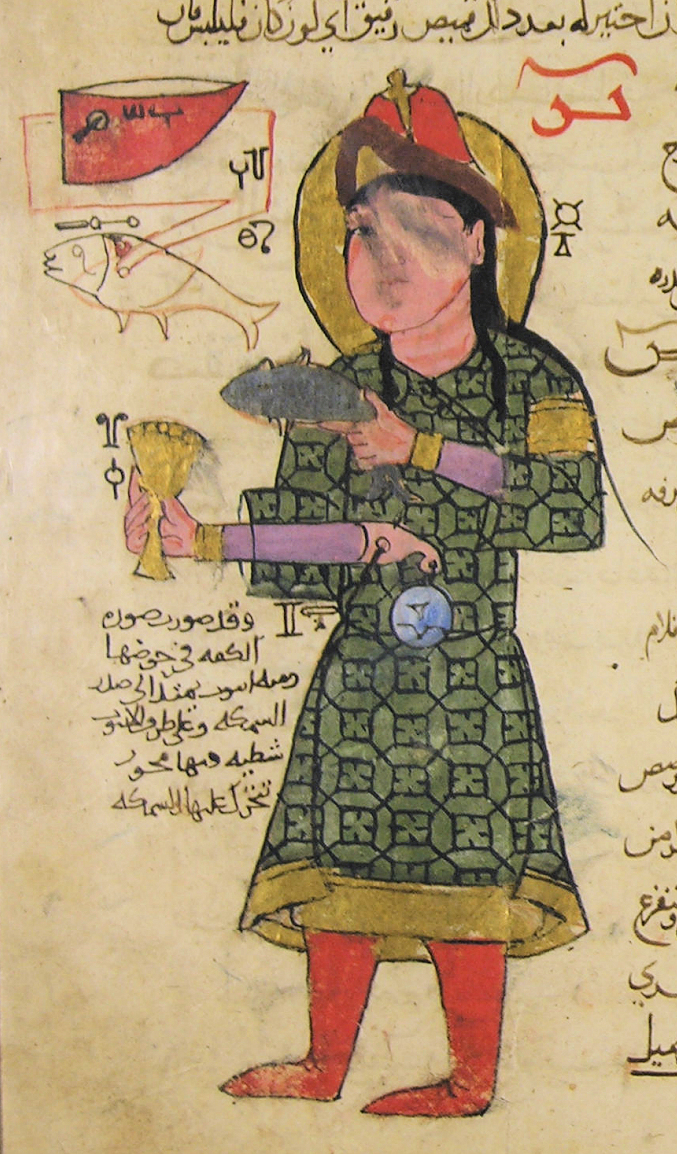
Turkic figure. Amid, modern-day Diyarbakır, Turkey, 1206 (Ms. Ahmet III 3472).

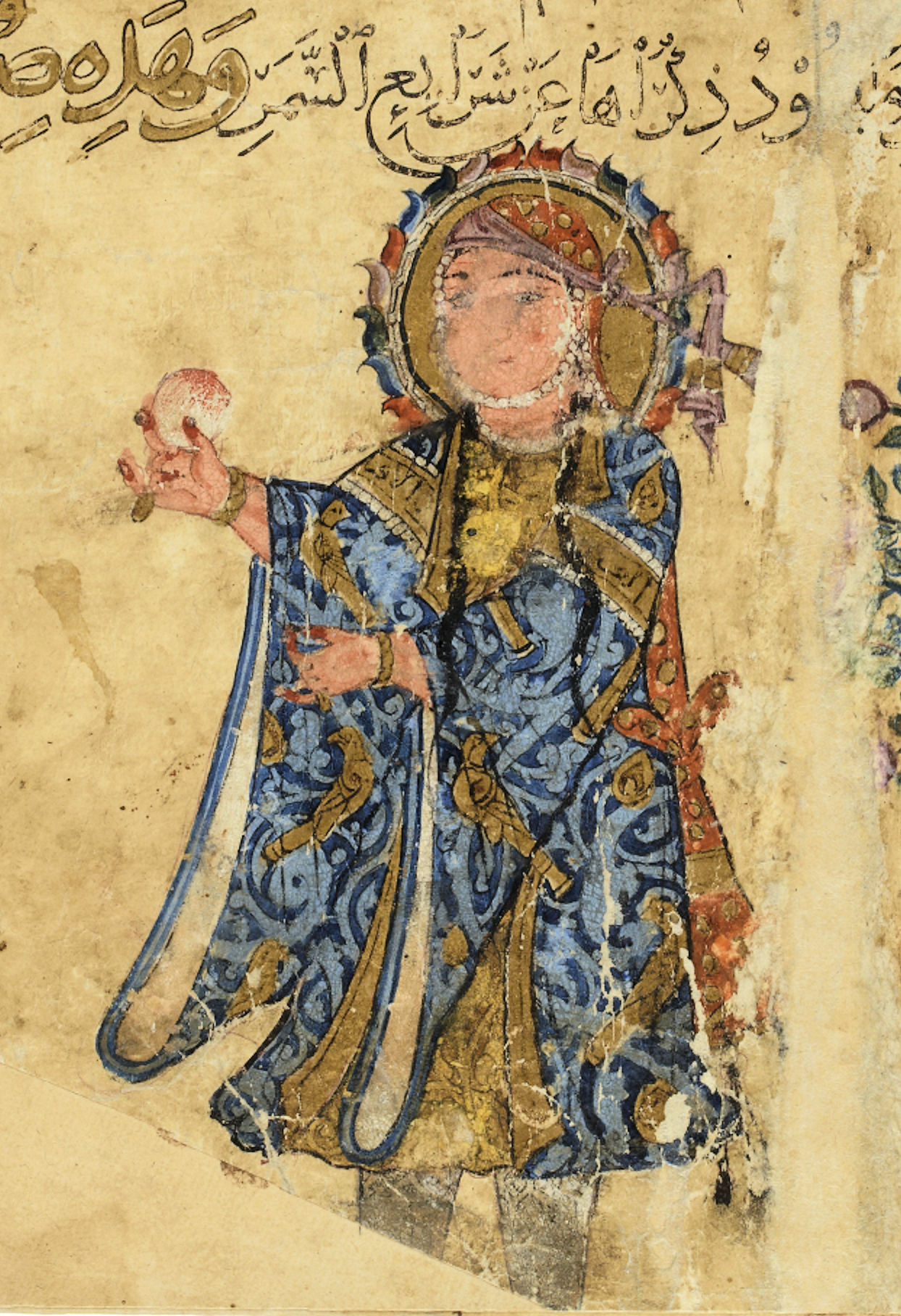
A Jariya prostitute, in the Maqamat al-Hariri (Arabe 3929), also thought to belong to the same Artuqid school of painting.

== List of rulers ==
The major branches of the Artuqid dynasty were those based in Hasankeyf, Harput, Mardin and Aleppo.

=== Hasankeyf branch ===
This branch was initially based at Hasankeyf (Ḥiṣn Kaifā). The capital moved to Diyarbakır (Amid) in 1183.

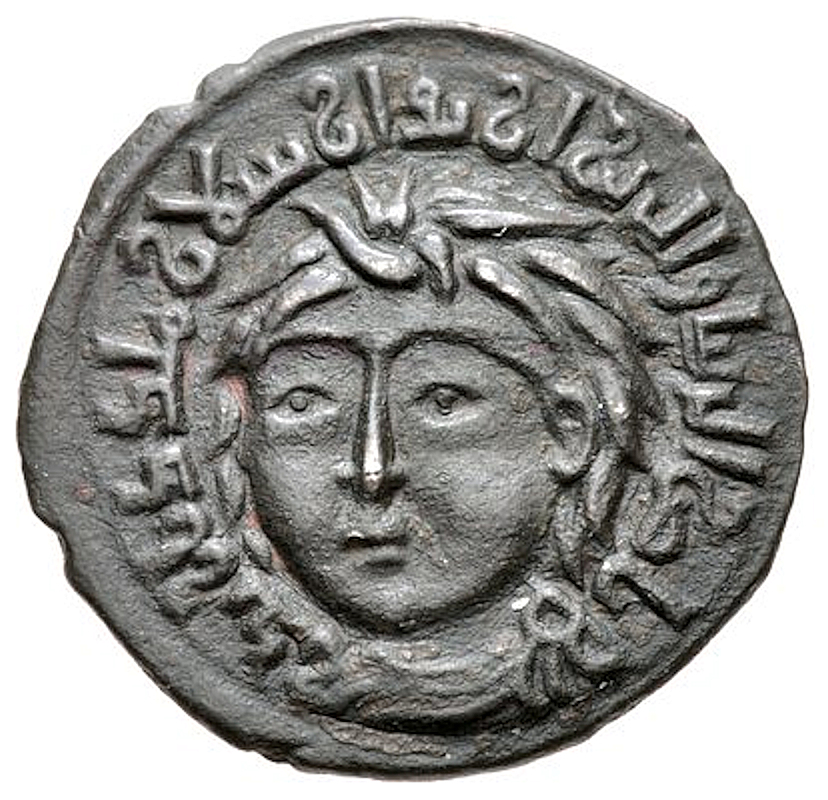
Male bust on a coin of Nasir al-Din Artuq Arslan, probably Mardin, dated AH 611 (1214–1215 CE)

- Sökmen, son of Artuk, 1102–1104
- Ibrahim of Ḥiṣn Kaifā, son of Sökmen, 1104–1109
- Rukn al-Dawla Dāʾūd (Dāʾūd), son of Sökmen, 1109–1144
- Kara Arslan, son of Dāʾūd, 1144–1174)
- Nūr al-Dīn Muḥammad, son of Kara Arslan, 1174–1185
- Sökmen II, son of Nūr al-Dīn Muḥammad, 1185–1201
- Nāṣir al-Dīn Maḥmūd, son of Nūr al-Dīn Muḥammad, 1201–1222
- Rukn al-Dīn Mawdūd, son of Nāṣir al-Dīn Maḥmūd, 1222–1232/33.

Following the rule of Rukn al-Dīn Mawdūd, the territories of the Hasankeyf branch of the Artuqids were taken over by the Ayyubids.

=== Harput branch ===
The Harput branch was initially part of the Hasankeyf branch until 1185, gaining independence from Kara Arslan.

- Imad ud-din Abu Bakr, son of Kara Arslan, 1185–1204
- Ibrahim ibn Abu Bakr, son of Abu Bakr, 1203–1223
- Ahmad Khidr, son of Ibrahim, 1223–1234
- Artuq Shah, son of Ahmad Khidr, 1234.

Harput was conquered by Kayqubad I, Seljuk sultan of Rûm, in 1234.

=== Mardin branch ===
The Mardin branch of the Artuqids ruled in Mardin and Mayyafariqin from 1101–1409 and were primarily descendants of Ilghazi and his brother Alp-Yaruq.

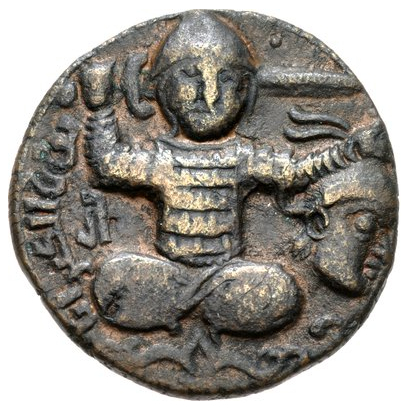
Turk seated facing with legs crossed, holding sword and crowned severed head, with legend to left "Nur al-Din Atabeg" (نور الدين اتا / بك), probably the Zengid ruler Nur al-Din Arslan Shah I, on a coin of the Artuqid Husam al-Din Yuluq Arslan, dated AH 596 (1199–1200 CE). (Note: "But who was the "Nur al-Din Atabeg” featured on the obverse side of most coins of this type, and why was he also recognized? He is not further identified on the coins, but the most logical candidate would appear to be Nur al-Din Arslan Shah I, the Zengid Atabeg of Mosul (589—607 / 1193—1210), the only atabeg with the laqab Nur al-Din known to have been active at that time. This identification was first advanced by Mitchiner in 1977 and was repeated by Hennequin in the Paris catalog.") (Note: "But who was the "Nur al-Din Atabeg” featured on the obverse side of most coins of this type, and why was he also recognized? He is Nur al-Din Arslan Shah I, the Zengid Atabeg of Mosul (1193–1210), which was discovered by Mitchiner in 1977. Why the Artuqid Yuluq Arslan of Mardin should put his rival's name on his coins is not altogether clear.")

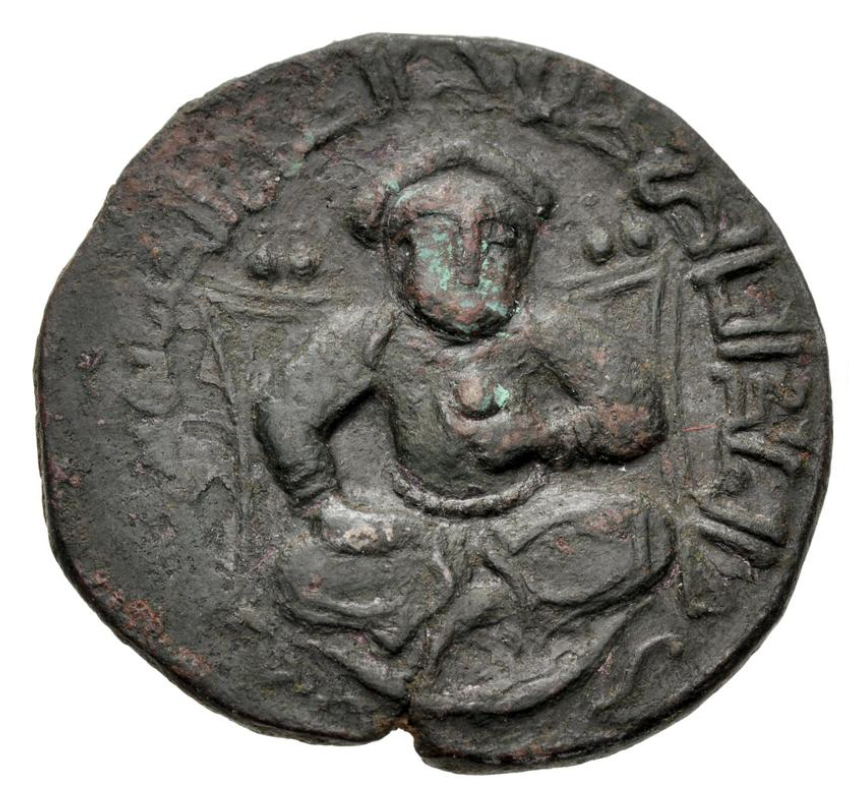
Coinage of Artuk Arslan. Dated 1237–1238 CE

- Yāqūti, son of Alp-Yaruq (son of Artuk), 1101–1104
- 'Ali ibn Yāqūti, son of Yāqūti, 1104
- Sökmen, son of Artuk, 1101–1104
- Ilghazi, son of Artuk, 1107–1122
- Timurtash, son of Ilghazi, 1122–1154
- Alpï I, son of Timurtash, 1154–1176
- Ilghazi II, son of Alpï I, 1176–1184
- Yülük Arslan, son of Ilghazi II, 1184–1203
- Artuk Arslan, son of Yülük Arslan, 1203–1239
- Al-Sa'id Najm al-Din Ghazi I, son of Yülük Arslan, 1239–1260
- Al-Muzaffar Fakhr al-Din Kara Arslan, son of Ghazi I, 1260–1292. Submitted to Hulegu.
- Al-Sa'id Shams al-Din Dāwūd I, son of al-Muzaffar Fakhr al-Din Kara Arslan, 1292–1294
- Al-Mansur Najm al-Din Ghazi II, son of al-Muzaffar Fakhr al-Din Kara Arslan, 1294–1312
- 'Ali Alpï II, son of Ghazi II, 1312
- As-Salih Shams al-Din Mahmūd, son of Ghazi II, 1312–1364
- Al-Mansur Husam al-Din Ahmad, son of Mahmūd, 1364–1367
- As-Salih Shams al-Din Mahmūd (second rule), 1367
- Al-Muzaffar Fakhr al-Din Dāwūd II, son of Mahmūd, 1367–1376
- Al-Zahir Majd al-Din 'Isā, son of Dāwūd II, 1376–1407
- Al-Salih Şhihab al-Din Ahmad, son of Al-Zahir Majd al-Din 'Isā, 1407–1409.

Mardin was conquered by the Qara Qoyunlu, a Turkoman tribe, in 1409.

=== Aleppo subbranch ===
The Artuqid branch that ruled Aleppo was an offshoot of the Mardin branch and included descendants of Ilghazi and his brothers Abd al-Jabar and Bahram ibn Artuk. See also Rulers of Aleppo.

- Ilghazi, son of Artuk, 1117–1121
- Badr ad-Dawlah Süleiman, son of Abd al-Jabar (son of Artuk), 1121–1123
- Belek Ghazi, son of Bahram ibn Artuk (son of Artuk), 1123–1124
- Timurtash, son of Ilghazi, 1124–1125
- Seljuks under al-Bursuqi and various others, 1125–1127
- Badr ad-Dawlah Süleiman (second rule), 1127–1128.

Aleppo was taken by Zengi in 1128 and ruled by the Zengid dynasty until 1183.

== Genealogy of House of Artuq ==
House of Artuq

Artuqid Beylik (Hasankeyf)
Artuqid Beylik (Harput)
Artuqid Beylik (Mardin)
Artuqid Beylik (Aleppo)

Artuq
Suqman I r. 1102–1104 | Il-Ghazi I r. 1104–1122 r. 1117–1122 | Alp-Yaruq | Bahram | Abdul-Jabbar
Ibrahim r. 1104–1109 | Dawud r. 1109–1144 | Timur-Tash r. 1122–1154 r. 1124–1125 | Yaquti r. 1102–1104 | Balak r. 1123–1124 | Sulayman r. 1122–1123, 1127–1128
Qara-Arslan r. 1144–1174 | Alpi I r. 1154–1176 | Ali r. 1104–1104
Muhammad r. 1174–1185 | Abu Bakr r. 1185–1204 | Il-Ghazi II r. 1176–1184
Suqman II r. 1185–1201 | Mahmud r. 1201–1222 | Ibrahim r. 1204–1223 | Yuluq-Arslan r. 1184–1203
Maw'dud r. 1222–1232 | Ahmad-Khidr r. 1223–1234 | Artuq-Arslan r. 1203–1239 | Ghazi I r. 1239–1260
Artuq-Shah r. 1234–1234 | Qara-Arslan r. 1260–1292
Dawud I r. 1292–1294 | Ghazi II r. 1294–1312
Alpi II r. 1312–1312 | Mahmud r. 1312–1364, 1367–1367
Ahmad I r. 1364–1367 | Dawud II r. 1367–1376
Isa r. 1376–1407
Ahmad II r. 1407–1409

== Coinage ==
Artuqids coinage was very figural, "with its apparent classical and Byzantine motifs and representations".

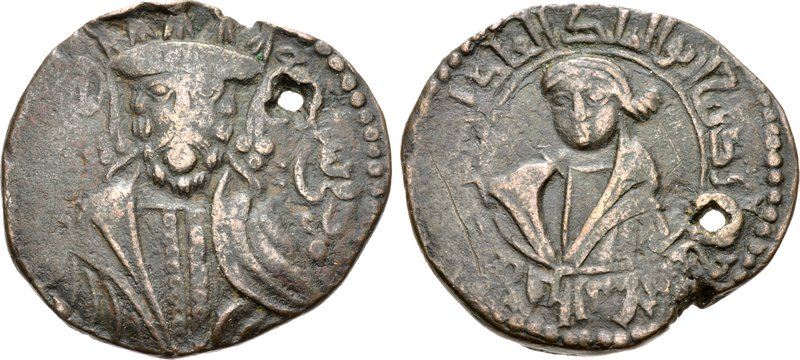
Crowned, bearded Byzantine-style bust, with clean-shaven Fakhr al-Din Qara Arslan, Hisn Kayfa or Amid mint. Dated AH 559 (1163–1164 CE).

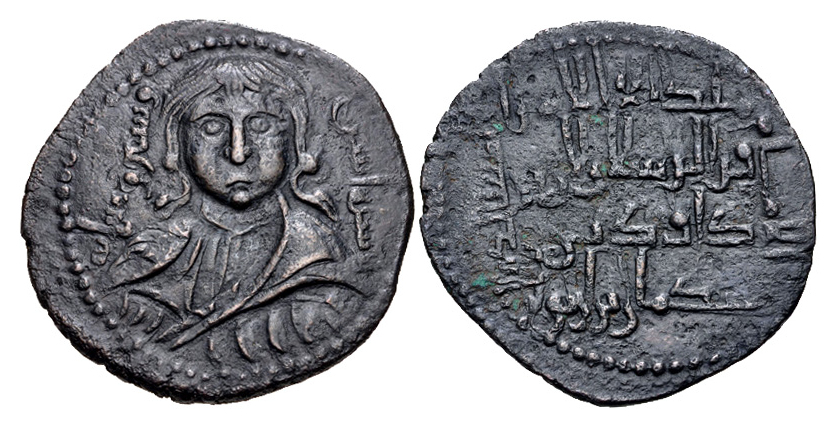
Coinage of Kara Arslan, dated AH 562 (1166–1167 CE). Artuqid coinage was very figural, "with its apparent classical and Byzantine motifs and representations".

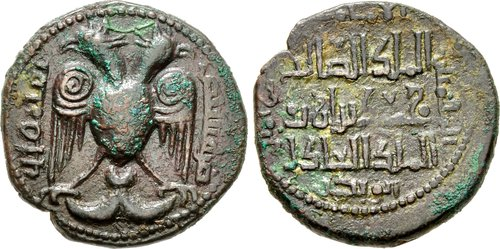
Nasir al-Din Mahmud, dirham, 619 AH (1213–1214 CE)

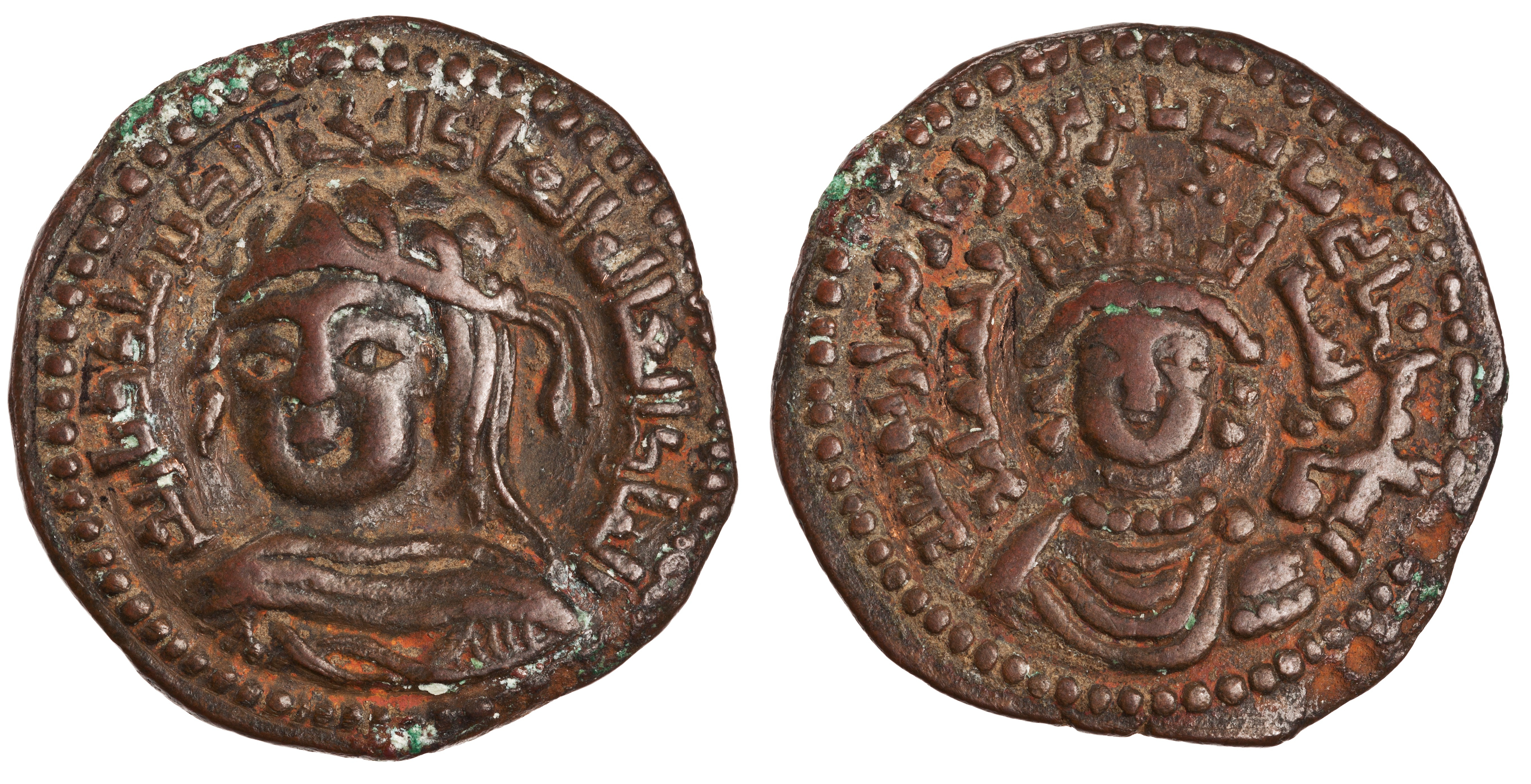
Najm al-Din Alpi, Mardin, 558 H (1162–1163 CE)

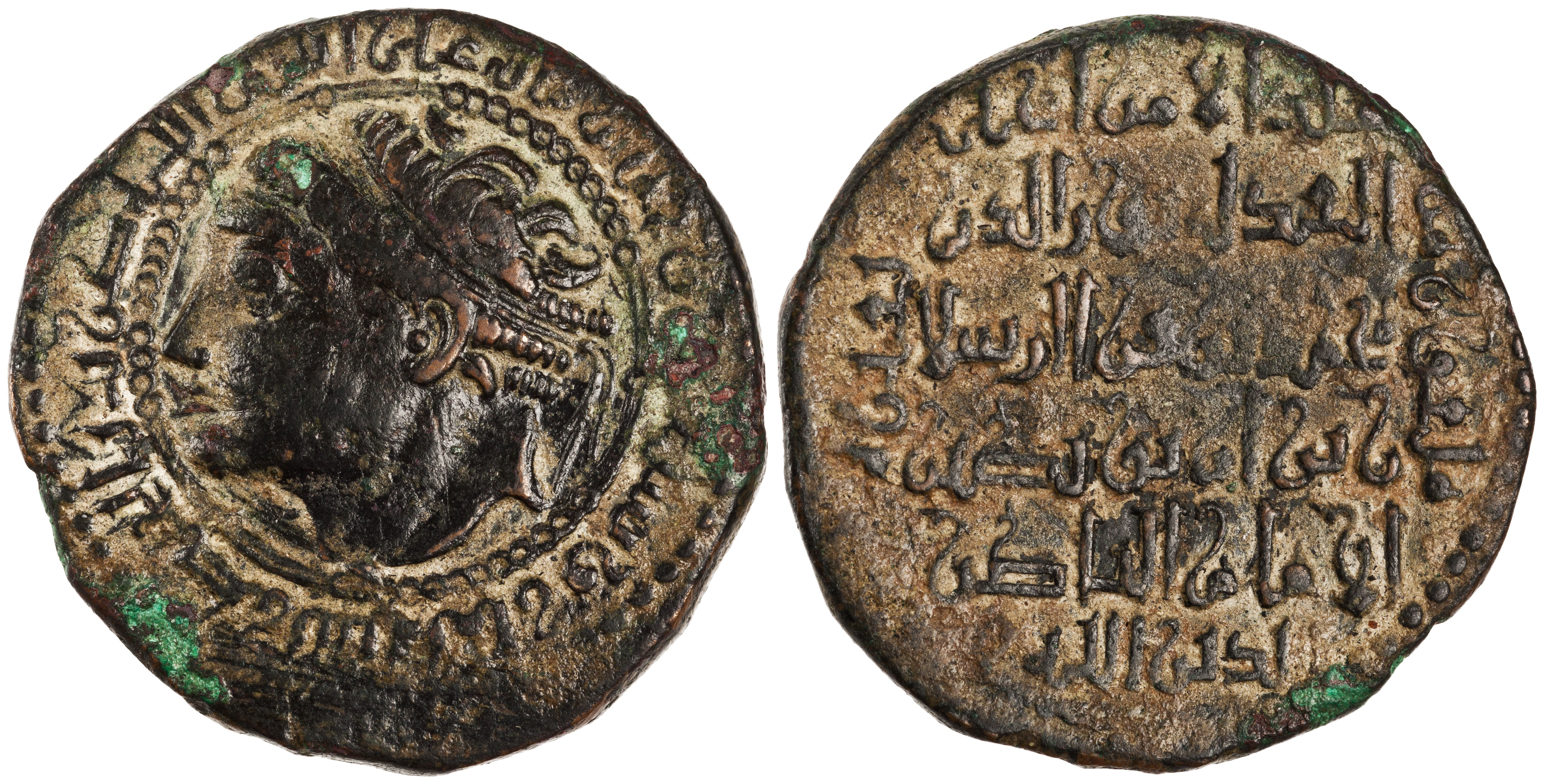
Nur al-Din Muhammad, al-Hisn, 578 H (1182–1183 CE), with youthful Seleucid head.

== See also ==
- List of Sunni Muslim dynasties
- Artuklu Palace
- Tarīkh Mayyāfāriqīn

== Sources ==
- Aslanapa, Oktay (1991). Anadolu'da ilk Türk mimarisi: Başlangıcı ve gelişmesi [Early Turkish Architecture in Anatolia: Beginnings and Development] (in Turkish). Ankara: AKM Publications. ISBN 975-16-0264-5. Archived from the original on 2004-08-30.
- Atbaş, Zeynep (1 August 2019). Artistic Aspects of Sultan Bayezid II's Book Treasury Collection: Extant Volumes Preserved at the Topkapı Palace Museum Library (Treasures of Knowledge: An Inventory of the Ottoman Palace Library (1502/3–1503/4) (2 vols)). Brill. p. 195. doi:10.1163/9789004402508_005.
- Balafrej, Lamia (2022). "Automated Slaves, Ambivalent Images, and Noneffective Machines in al-Jazari's Compendium of the Mechanical Arts, 1206". 21: Inquiries into Art, History, and the Visual. 3 (4): 737–774. doi:10.11588/xxi.2022.4.91685. ISSN 2701-1569.
- Bosworth, Clifford Edmund (1976). The Mediaeval Islamic Underworld: The Banū Sāsān in Arabic life and lore. E.J. Brill. ISBN 9789004045026.
- Bosworth, Clifford Edmund (2004). The New Islamic Dynasties: A Chronological and Genealogical Manual. Edinburgh University Press. ISBN 0-7486-2137-7.
- Canby, Sheila R.; Beyazit, Deniz; Rugiadi, Martina; Peacock, A. C. S. (27 April 2016). Court and Cosmos: The Great Age of the Seljuqs. Metropolitan Museum of Art. ISBN 978-1-58839-589-4.
- Contadini, Anna (2012). A world of beasts: a thirteenth-century illustrated Arabic book on animals (the Kitāb Na't al-Ḥayawān) in the Ibn Bakhtīshū' tradition. Leiden Boston: Brill. ISBN 978-90-04-20100-2.
- Eger, A. Asa (18 November 2014). The Islamic-Byzantine Frontier: Interaction and Exchange Among Muslim and Christian Communities. Bloomsbury Publishing. ISBN 978-0-85772-685-8.
- Hillenbrand, Carole (1979). The History of the Jazīra 1100–1150: the contribution of Ibn Al-Azraq al-Fāriqī (PhD thesis). University of Edinburgh. hdl:1842/7341.
- Hillenbrand, Carole (1990). A Muslim Principality in Crusader Times: The Early Artuqid State. Nederlands Historisch-Archaeologisch Instituut. ISBN 9789062580668.
- Hillenbrand, Carole (2000), The Crusades: Islamic Perspectives, Routledge
- Hillenbrand, Carole (2019). "Artuqid dynasty". In Tucker, Spencer C. (ed.). Middle East Conflicts from Ancient Egypt to the 21st Century: An Encyclopedia and Document Collection. Vol. 1: A-F. Bloomsbury. ISBN 979-8216117292.
- Holt, P.M. (1989), The Age of the Crusades: The Near East from the Eleventh Century to 1517, Longman
- Künker, Fritz Rudolf (2008). Künker Auktion 137 – The De Wit Collection of Medieval Coins, 1000 Years of European Coinage, Part III: England, Ireland, Scotland, Spain, Portugal, Italy, Balkan, the Middle East, Crusader States, Jetons und Weights. Numismatischer Verlag Künker.
- Öztuna, Yılmaz (1996). Devletler ve Hanedanlar (in Turkish). Vol. 2. Kültür Bakanlığı Yayınları.
- Runciman, Steven (1952), A History of the Crusades, vol. 2, Cambridge University Press
- Setton, Kenneth, ed. (1969–1989), A History of the Crusades, Madison: University of Wisconsin Press, archived from the original on 2003-04-01
- Shah, Amina (1980). The assemblies of al-Hariri : fifty encounters with the Shaykh Abu Zayd of Seruj. Octagon Press. pp. 212–220. ISBN 978-0-900860-86-7.
- Snelders, B. (2010). Identity and Christian–Muslim interaction : medieval art of the Syrian Orthodox from the Mosul area. Peeters, Leuven.
- Spengler, William F.; Sayles, Wayne G. (1992). Turkoman Figural Bronze Coins and Their Iconography: The Artuquids. Clio's Cabinet. ISBN 978-1-879080-02-7.
- Van Donzel, E. J., ed. (1994). Islamic Desk Reference. Brill.
- Ward, Rachel (1 January 1985). "Evidence for a School of Painting at the Artuqid Court". Oxford Studies in Islamic Art. 1: 69–83.
- Whelan, Estelle (1988), "Representations of the Khassakiyah and the Origins of Mamluk Emblems", in Soucek, Priscilla (ed.), Content and Context of Visual Arts in the Islamic World, University Park, Pennsylvania: Pennsylvania State University Press
