= 1385 =

1385 in various calendars
- Gregorian calendar: 1385; MCCCLXXXV
- Ab urbe condita: 2138
- Armenian calendar: 834; ԹՎ ՊԼԴ
- Assyrian calendar: 6135
- Balinese saka calendar: 1306–1307
- Bengali calendar: 791–792
- Berber calendar: 2335
- English Regnal year: 8 Ric. 2 – 9 Ric. 2
- Buddhist calendar: 1929
- Burmese calendar: 747
- Byzantine calendar: 6893–6894
- Chinese calendar: 甲子年 (Wood Rat); 4082 or 3875 — to — 乙丑年 (Wood Ox); 4083 or 3876
- Coptic calendar: 1101–1102
- Discordian calendar: 2551
- Ethiopian calendar: 1377–1378
- Hebrew calendar: 5145–5146
- Hindu calendars
- Vikram Samvat: 1441–1442
- Shaka Samvat: 1306–1307
- Kali Yuga: 4485–4486
- Holocene calendar: 11385
- Igbo calendar: 385–386
- Iranian calendar: 763–764
- Islamic calendar: 786–787
- Japanese calendar: Shitoku 2 (至徳２年)
- Javanese calendar: 1298–1299
- Julian calendar: 1385; MCCCLXXXV
- Korean calendar: 3718
- Minguo calendar: 527 before ROC 民前527年
- Nanakshahi calendar: −83
- Thai solar calendar: 1927–1928
- Tibetan calendar: ཤིང་ཕོ་བྱི་བ་ལོ་ (male Wood-Rat); 1511 or 1130 or 358 — to — ཤིང་མོ་གླང་ལོ་ (female Wood-Ox); 1512 or 1131 or 359

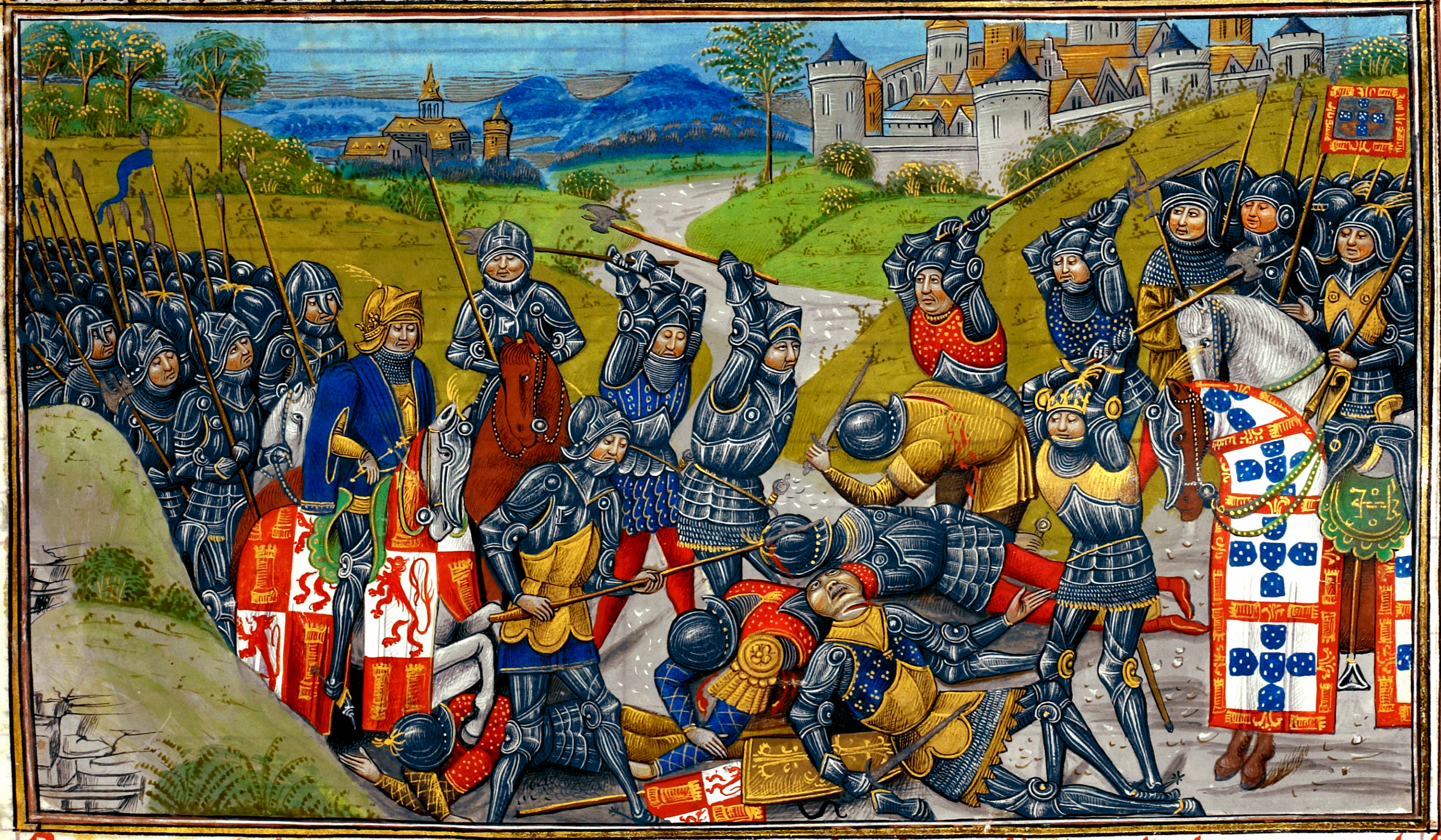
August 14: The Battle of Aljubarrota is fought in Portugal to determine which of two claimants— King Juan of Castile or Joao, Master of Aviz— will become the King of Portugal.

Year 1385 (MCCCLXXXV) was a common year starting on Sunday of the Julian calendar.

== Events ==
=== January–March ===
- January 11 – After learning that several of his cardinals had been debating whether to depose him on grounds that he is insane, Pope Urban VI orders the arrest of all of the cardinals within his reach. Giovanni da Amelia, Gentile di Sangro, Adam Eston, Ludovico Donato, Bartolomeo da Cogorno, and Marino del Giudice are all arrested and imprisoned and tortured at the castle of Nocera. Except for Eston, the cardinals arrested are put to death in Genoa by the end of 1386.
- February 3 – (2 Muharram 787 AH) The madrasa (a religious school) of the Emir of Artuqid Empire, Majd al-Din Isa Al-Zahir, is dedicated and the date is placed on an inscription on the wall. The building is now a historic landmark in the city of Mardin, now located in Turkey.
- February 14 – John of Gaunt, Duke of Lancaster, son of the late King Edward III of England and uncle of King Richard II, flees London after learning during a joust that he has been targeted for assassination by the King's advisors Thomas Mowbray, 1st Duke of Norfolk and Robert de Vere, 9th Earl of Oxford; and John de Montacute, Earl of Salisbury
- February – Bugaya becomes the new Sultan of Kano in what is now northern Nigeria, upon the death of his brother Yaji I.
- March 13 – Officials in the Kingdom of Scotland discover that 700 pounds sterling of bullion has been taken from the customs collectors of Edinburgh by John Stewart, the Earl of Carrick, who diverted the funds while acting as Guardian of Scotland.
- March 22 – From the port of Sluis (now in the Netherlands), the Kingdom of France dispatches a fleet of ships, carrying an army of 1,315 soldiers, 300 crossbowmen and 200 assistants, to aid the Kingdom of Scotland in defense of an invasion by the Kingdom of England. The fleet arrives at the Scottish port of Leith, near Scotland's capital, Edinburgh, on March 25.

=== April–June ===
- April 6 – At Coimbra, João, Master of Aviz, son of the late King Pedro I of Portugal, is declared by the Cortes of Coimbra to be the new King of Portugal.
- May 6 – Gian Galeazzo Visconti leads a coup d'etat against his uncle, Bernabò Visconti, Lord of Milan and begins conquests to transform Milan into a Duchy, with himself as the Duke of Milan.
- May 14 – The two-day Battle of Sluys concludes on the North Sea off of the coast of the Netherlands as England's Royal Navy, led by the Admiral, Thomas Percy, 1st Earl of Worcester attempts to blockade the Flemish port of Sluis and more than 100 ships stationed there. Jean de Vienne, Admiral of France, makes a successful counter-attack and the Royal Navy ships sail back to England to defend London.
- May 29 – The Battle of Trancoso is fought between the Kingdom of Portugal and the Crown of Castile after a Castilian army pillages and burns the city of Viseu. As the Castilians are marching back with their plundered loot and prisoners, they are met by the Portuguese Army, which kills more than 400 soldiers along with six of the seven Castilian officers, then recovers the stolen treasure and releases all of the Portuguese citizens taken prisoner.
- June 10 – English invasion of Scotland (1385): Preparing to lead invade Scotland as soon as the truce between England and Scotland expires on July 15, King Richard II of England assembles an army at Nottingham.

=== July–September ===
- July 8 – English invasion of Scotland (1385): King Robert II of Scotland sends two armies of Scottish soldiers and French mercenaries south from Edinburgh and raids the English county of Northumberland.
- July 16 – King Richard II directs suppliers in Durham, Yorkshire, Northumberland, Cumberland and Westmorland to be prepared to supply food to the English Army, to be purchased "at a reasonable price for ready payment."
- July 17 – Charles VI of France marries Isabeau of Bavaria; the wedding is celebrated with France's first court ball.
- July 21 – King Juan of Castile asserts in his will that he is the King of Portugal by virtue of his marriage in 1383 to Queen Beatriz of Portugal
- August 6 –
  - English invasion of Scotland (1385): After setting off from Berwick-upon-Tweed, the English Army invades Scotland. The English soldiers quickly run out of food, since to supply lines have been created and the residents of the border towns in Scotland have fled, taking their food with them.
  - Edmund of Langley is elevated to become the first Duke of York in England.
- August 11 – English invasion of Scotland (1385): The English Army reaches Edinburgh, capital of Scotland, and finds it deserted as its civilian residents have fled and the Scottish and French soldiers have retreated to Ettrick Forest. The frustrated English soldiers burn and loot the city.|
- August 14
  - Battle of Aljubarrota: John of Aviz defeats John I of Castile in the decisive battle of the 1383–85 Crisis in Portugal. John of Aviz is crowned King John I of Portugal, ending Queen Beatrice's rule, and Portugal's independence from the Kingdom of Castile is secured.
  - The Union of Krewo establishes the Jagiellonian dynasty in Poland and Lithuania, through the proposed marriage of Queen regnant Jadwiga of Poland and Grand Duke Jogaila of Lithuania, and sees the acceptance of Roman Catholicism by the Lithuanian elite, and an end to the Greater Poland Civil War.
- August 15 – English invasion of Scotland (1385): With England's Army having left its borders undefended, Scottish and French troops invade England and plunder Cumberland in retaliation for the burning of Edinburgh.
- August 17 – English invasion of Scotland (1385): Having accomplished nothing but destruction of property, the English Army begins its withdrawal from Scotland and returns to England.
- August 23 – In celebration of the marriage of Wilhelm the Courteous, Duke of Austria, to Jadwiga, Queen of Poland, the leaders of the city of Kraków grant amnesty to the prisoners in the city jail.
- August 31 – King Richard II of England begins an invasion of Scotland. The English burn Holyrood and Edinburgh, but return home without a decisive battle.
- September 7 – Scottish and French troops unsuccessfully try to besiege the walled city of Carlisle in England, but Sir Henry Percy, nicknamed "Hotspur" breaks the siege and the attackers withdraw to Scotland, ending the war between the two kingdoms.
- September 18 – Battle of Savra: Serbian forces under Balša II and Ivaniš Mrnjavčević are defeated by Ottoman commander Hayreddin Pasha, near Berat.

=== October–December ===
- October 15 – Battle of Valverde: The armies of Portugal defeat Castile.
- November 1 – Sigismund of Luxembourg, Margrave of Brandenburg and son of the late Charles IV, Holy Roman Emperor, enforces a 1373 agreement of betrothal and marries Mary, Queen of Hungary, citing an agreement that had been made by King Louis I of Hungary.
- December 31 – King Carlo III, ruler of the Kingdom of Naples, is crowned as King Károly II of Hungary by the Archbishop Demeter of Esztergom at Székesfehérvár after a group of Hungarian nobles helps him overthrow Queen Maria.

=== Date unknown ===
- Tokhtamysh of the Golden Horde conquers parts of the Jalayirid Sultanate in western Persia, causing a rift between himself and Timur of the Timurid Empire, who had also wanted to conquer Persia.
- Olav IV of Norway is elected as titular King of Sweden, in opposition to the unpopular King Albert.
- The Hongwu Emperor of China's Ming dynasty relents after eighteen tribute missions over the previous eight years, and agrees to invest King U of Goryeo.
- Construction is completed on
  - Castello Estense in Ferrara (now in Italy)
  - Bodiam Castle (East Sussex, England)

== Births ==
- June 23 – Stephen, Count Palatine of Simmern-Zweibrücken (d. 1459)
- August 1 – John FitzAlan, 13th Earl of Arundel, English noble (d. 1421)
- August 15 – Richard de Vere, 11th Earl of Oxford, English noble (d. 1417)
- date unknown
  - Jean I, Duke of Alençon (d. 1415)
  - Jan van Eyck, Flemish painter (approximate date; d. 1441)
  - Margaret Holland, Duchess of Clarence, English noble (d. 1429)
  - Mircea I of Wallachia (d. 1418)

== Deaths ==
- June 28 – Andronikos IV Palaiologos, co-ruler of the Byzantine Empire
- August 7 – Joan of Kent, Dowager Princess of Wales, widow of Edward the Black Prince (b. 1328)
- September 18 – Balša II, ruler of Zeta
- October 15 – Dionysius I, Metropolitan of Moscow
- December 19 – Bernabò Visconti, Lord of Milan (b. 1319)
- date unknown
  - Xu Da, Chinese military leader (b. 1332)
