= Teriakovce =

Village and municipality in Slovakia

- Municipality
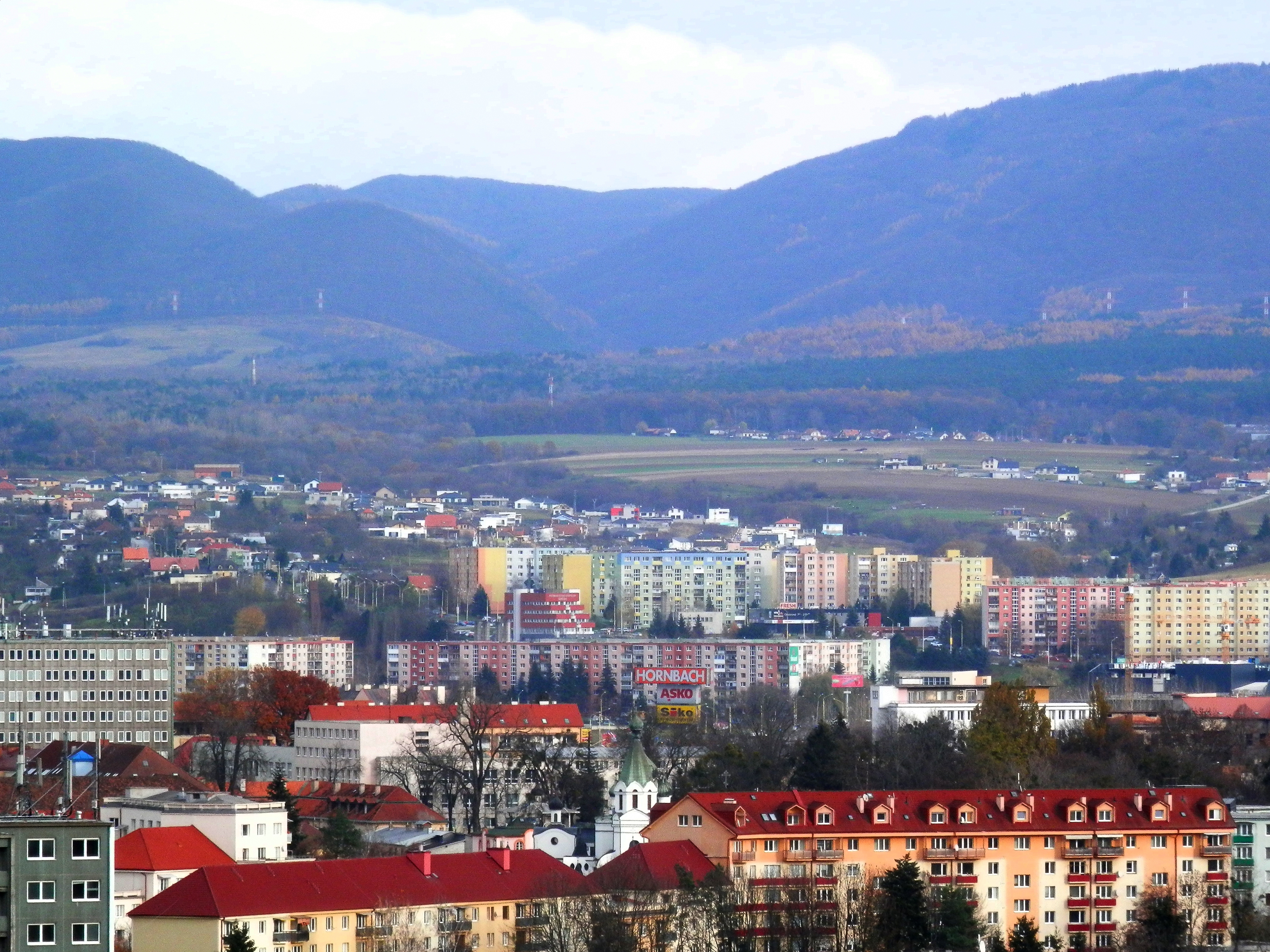

- Flag

- Location of Teriakovce in the Prešov Region Location of Teriakovce in Slovakia
- Coordinates: 48.98°N 21.32°E
- Country: Slovakia
- Region: Prešov Region
- District: Prešov District
- First mentioned: 1385

Area
  - Total: 3.18 km^{2} (1.23 sq mi)
- Elevation: 358 m (1,175 ft)

Population (2025)
  - Total: 1,284
- Time zone: UTC+1 (CET)
  - Summer (DST): UTC+2 (CEST)
- Postal code: 800 5
- Area code: +421 51
- Vehicle registration plate (until 2022): PO
- Website: teriakovce.sk

Teriakovce (Hungarian: Terjékfalva) is a village and municipality in Prešov District in the Prešov Region of eastern Slovakia. The village was first mentioned in the historical records in 1385.

== Geography ==
The municipality lies at an altitude of 358 metres (1,175 ft) and covers an area of 3.18 km^{2} (1.23 sq mi) (2025).

== Population ==
Population statistic (10 years)
Year	1995	2005	2015	2025
Count	385	403	698	1284
Difference		+4.67%	+73.20%	+83.95%

Population statistic
Year	2024	2025
Count	1241	1284
Difference		+3.46%

It has a population of 1284 people (31 December 2025).

=== Ethnicity ===
Census 2021 (1+ %)
Ethnicity	Number	Fraction
Slovak	819	96.35%
Rusyn	28	3.29%
Not found out	18	2.11%
Total	850	

In year 2021 was 850 people by ethnicity 819 as Slovak, 28 as Rusyn, 18 as Not found out, 5 as Other, 4 as Ukrainian, 2 as Czech, 2 as Russian, 2 as Polish, 2 as Albanian, 1 as Turkish, 1 as Hungarian and 1 as Bulgarian.

Note on population: The difference values of population numbers in the table "Population statistic" and in the sections "Ethnicity" & "Religion" is caused by the use of various statistical methods.

=== Religion ===
Census 2021 (1+ %)
Religion	Number	Fraction
Roman Catholic Church	578	68%
None	121	14.24%
Greek Catholic Church	80	9.41%
Evangelical Church	32	3.76%
Not found out	16	1.88%
Total	850	

In year 2021 was 850 people by religion 578 from Roman Catholic Church, 121 from None, 80 from Greek Catholic Church, 32 from Evangelical Church, 16 from Not found out, 6 from Eastern Orthodox Church, 4 from Seventh-day Adventist Church, 3 from Jehovah's Witnesses, 3 from Church of the Brethren, 2 from Paganism and natural spirituality, 2 from Other and not ascertained christian church, 2 from Other and 1 from Calvinist Church.
