= Sultan Isa Medrese =

Historic monument in Mardin, Turkey

- Sultan İsa Medresesi
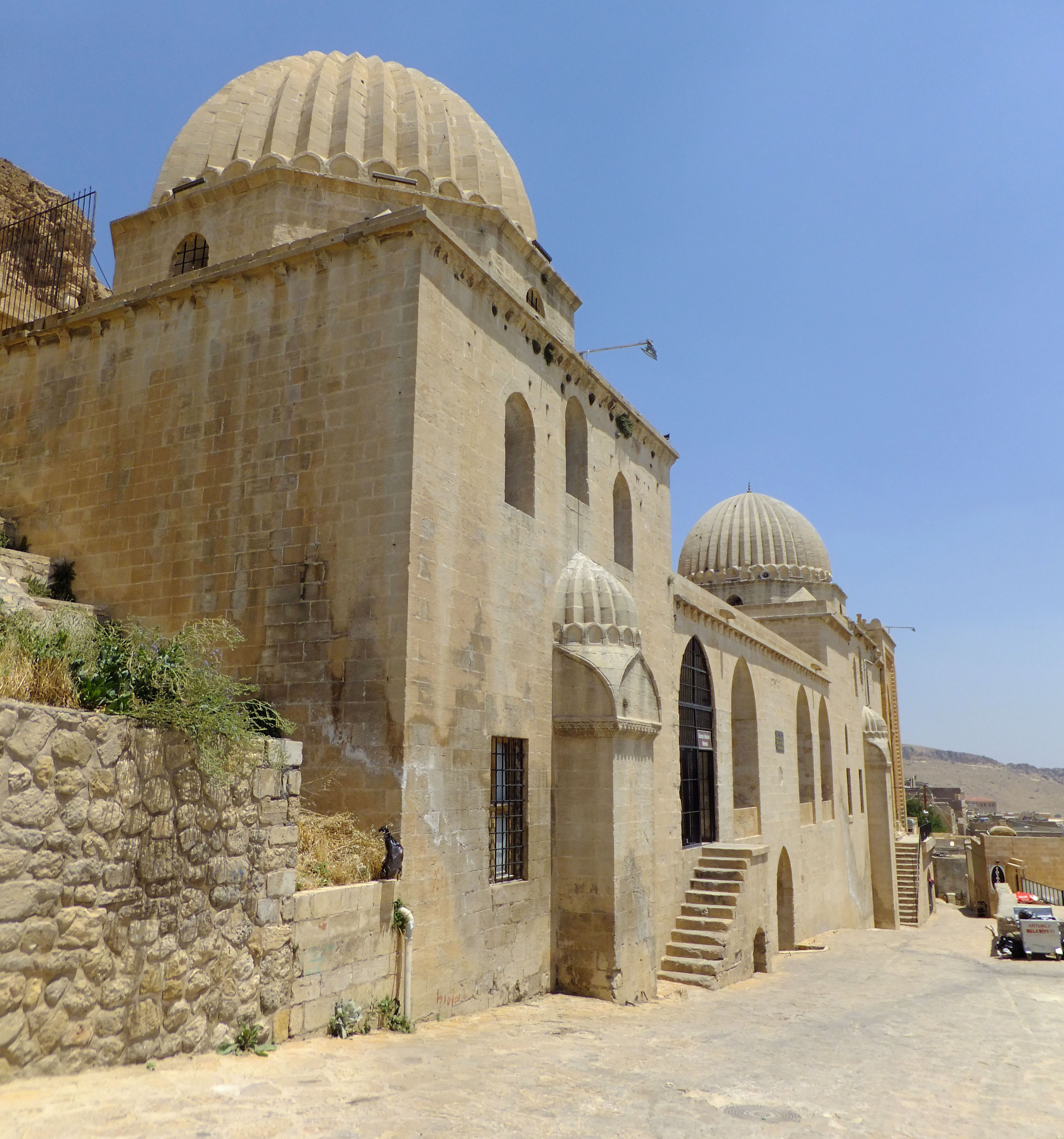
- Interactive map of the Sultan Isa Medrese area
- Alternative names: Zinciriye Medrese

General information
- Type: Madrasa
- Architectural style: Artuqid (Seljuk), Islamic
- Location: Mardin, Turkey
- Coordinates: 37°18′51″N 40°44′23.5″E
- Named for: Al-Zahir Majd al-Din 'Isā

Technical details
- Material: stone

The Sultan Isa Medrese or Sultan 'Isa Madrasa (Turkish: Sultan İsa Medresesi), also known as the Zinciriye Medrese or Isa Bey Medresesi, is a historic landmark and former madrasa in Mardin, Turkey. It was commissioned by Sultan Isa (r. 1376–1407), the penultimate Artuqid ruler of Mardin, and its construction was completed in 1385. The building was actually a külliye, or religious complex, consisting of a madrasa, a mosque, a mausoleum for the founder, and other elements arranged around two courtyards. The building previously housed the Mardin Museum.

== History ==
The foundation of the complex is well-documented thanks to several surviving inscriptions on the building which record the founder, Isa the Artuqid, and the date, 2nd Muharram 787 AH (3 February 1385 AD). The complex contains what appears to be a mausoleum chamber intended for the founder, but Isa was never buried here. The building went through a major restoration sometime during the Ottoman period, when much of the masonry was redone. Between 1932 and 1950s, the southern portico of the main courtyard partially collapsed and some of the decoration at the top of the portal disappeared. These elements, along with the northern gallery of the upper terrace, were restored over the course of the 20th century. In the early 21st century, around 2006, the building was restored again, cleaned, and much of the old masonry replaced with new stone.

== Description ==
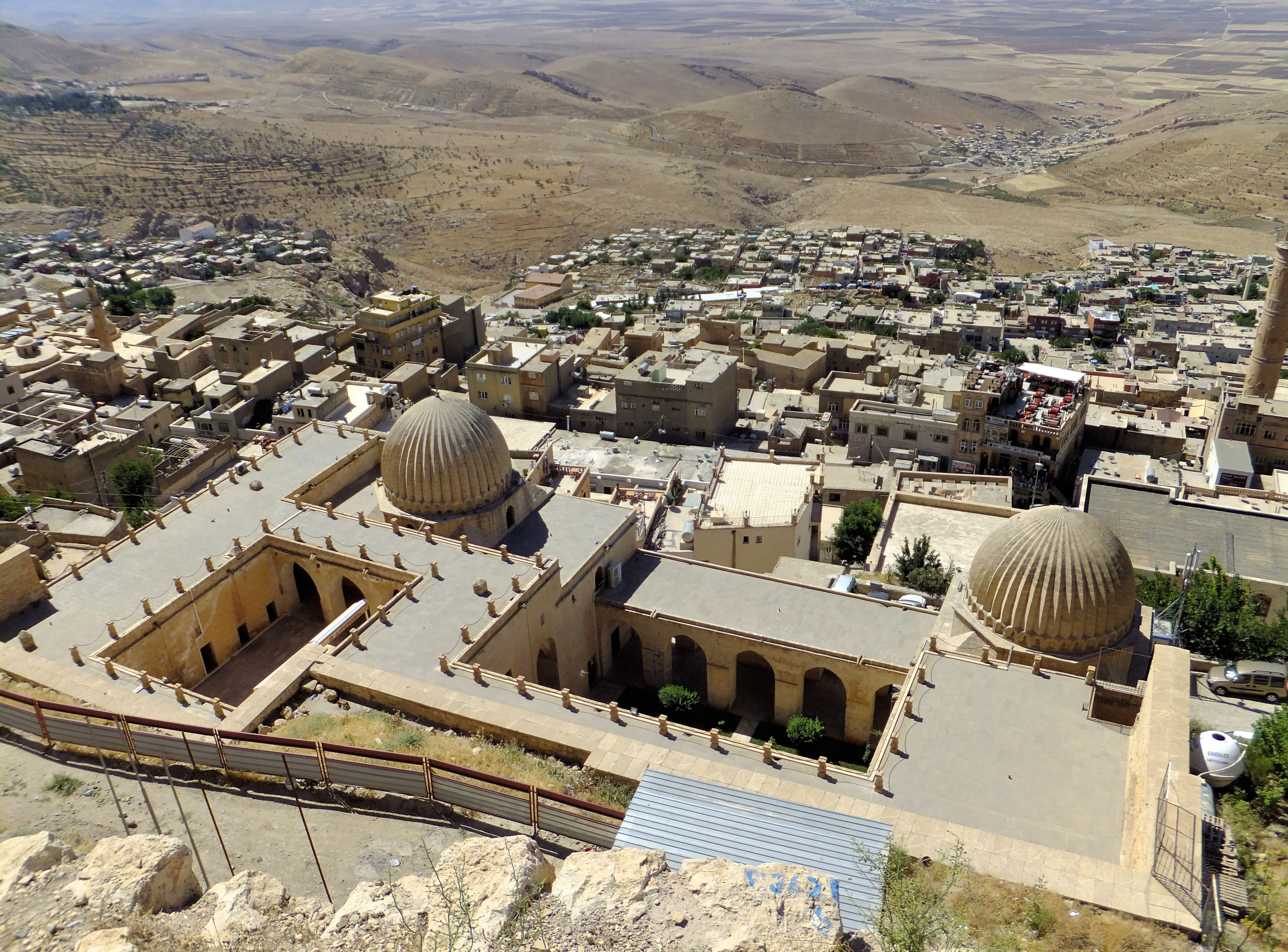
View of the complex above, showing the two courtyards and two domes

=== General layout ===
The structure was built on a slope overlooking the city and as a result it is laid out on two terraced levels, with the upper level extending further north. The rooms and sections are arranged around two courtyards: one on the ground floor and another on the upper level. The whole complex occupies a space about 45 metres long and 25 metres deep. While traditional madrasas were almost always arranged around one central courtyard, the Sultan Isa Medrese is the culmination of a trend in Artuqid designs where the building is configured around two courtyards, a more complex arrangement requiring careful planning.

=== Exterior ===
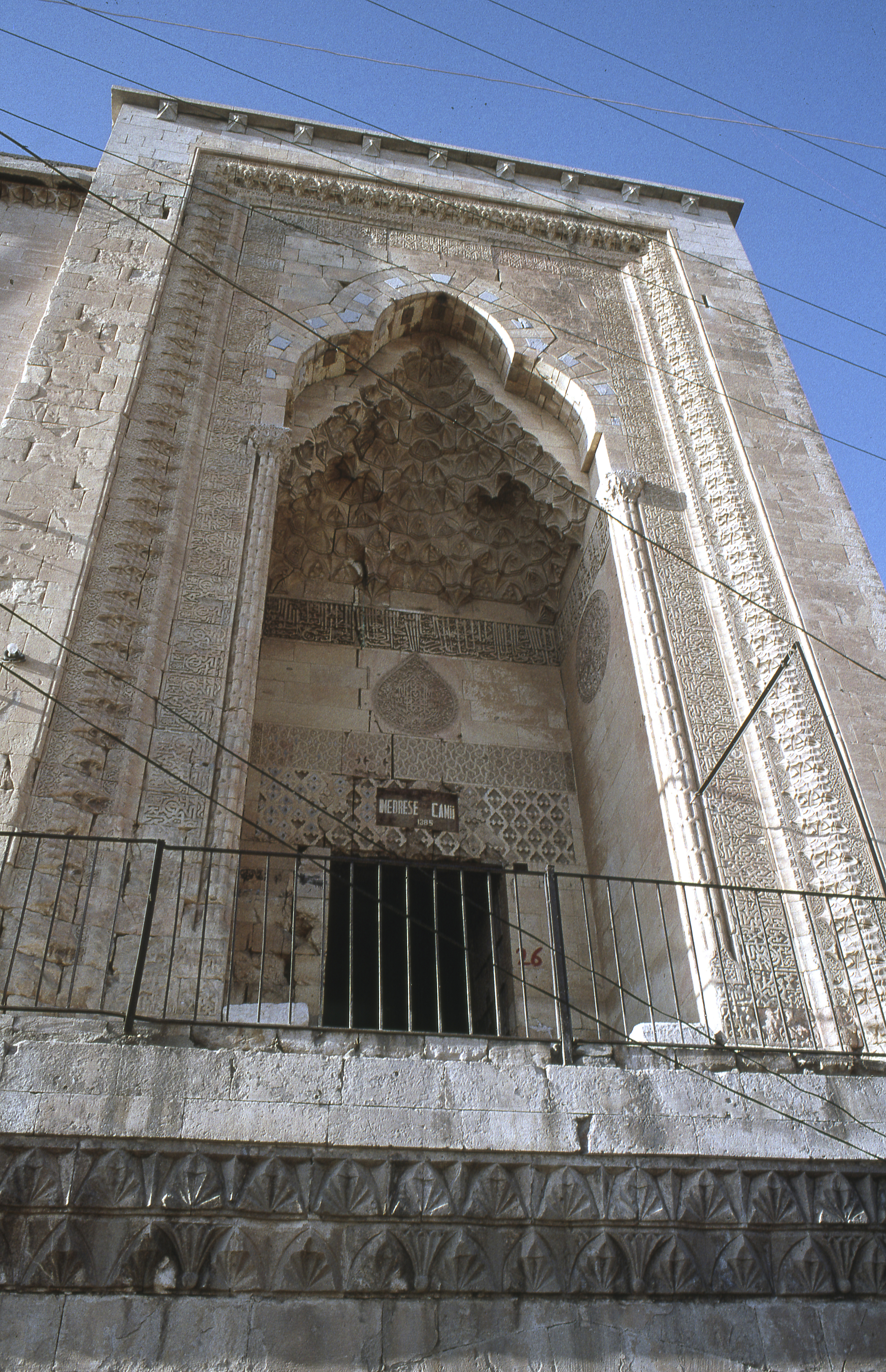
Main entrance portal, at the east end of the street façade

The long southern façade of the building is easily visible, arranged along a street on higher ground overlooking the city below. The other sides of the building are largely obscured by the sloping terrain around it. The two fluted domes of the complex, visible from the outside, correspond to the mosque and the mausoleum. Two buttresses on the southern façade, topped by small half-domes (also fluted like the main domes), reinforce each of the domed sections and are each located behind a mihrab (niche symbolizing the qibla or direction of prayer) of the chambers inside. A wall fountain is also located in the middle of the façade, below the portico of the courtyard (discussed below).

The building is entered through a monumental portal at the southeast corner, standing around 12 metres tall. The recessed portal is decorated with a muqarnas vault over the doorway. The wall right above the door is covered by zone of stone inlay, followed by a band of geometric decoration above it. In the area above this is a teardrop-shaped medallion carved with calligraphic motifs, while on the side walls to the right and left of this are circular medallions carved with intricate arabesques. The design of the teardrop medallion consists of a symmetrical calligraphic composition (known as muthannā or muṣanna) featuring the phrase tawakkulī 'alā Allāhi ta'ālā ("I place my trust in God, may He be exalted"), arranged around a vertical axis of symmetry and topped by a vegetal motif of palmettes. A band of text containing a Qur'anic verse (At-Tawbah, 9:18), in a form of thuluth script, wraps around this composition. Above these medallions is another horizontal inscription band running across the three inner walls of the portal, containing a long foundation text including a Qur'anic excerpt (part of 27:19 or 46:14), the name of the building's founder (Sultan Isa), some praise of the founder's piety, and the date (2nd Muharram 787 AH).

The front corners of portal's recess are carved into ornate engaged columns. Around the edges of the portal are several bands of ornamentation forming a decorative frame around the portal. A muqarnas cornice is accompanied by arabesque (vegetal) decoration bands. Inside this is another inscription band that consists of the same phrase found in the center of the teardrop medallion, except here it is repeated over and over in Kufic script. The top part of this decoration was restored in modern times.

Exterior and entrance portal

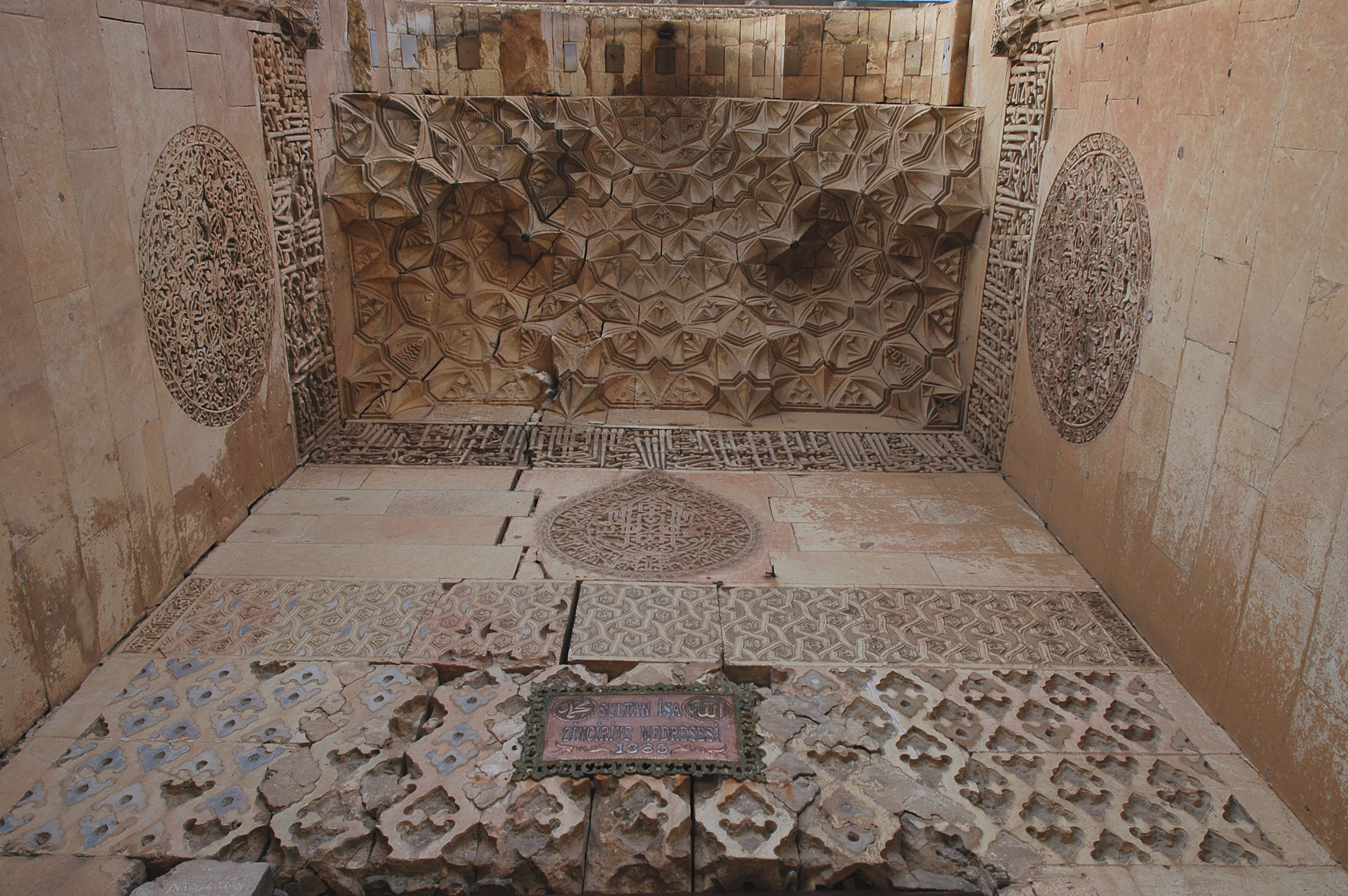
View from below of the stonework inlay, reliefs, and muqarnas vault in the portal

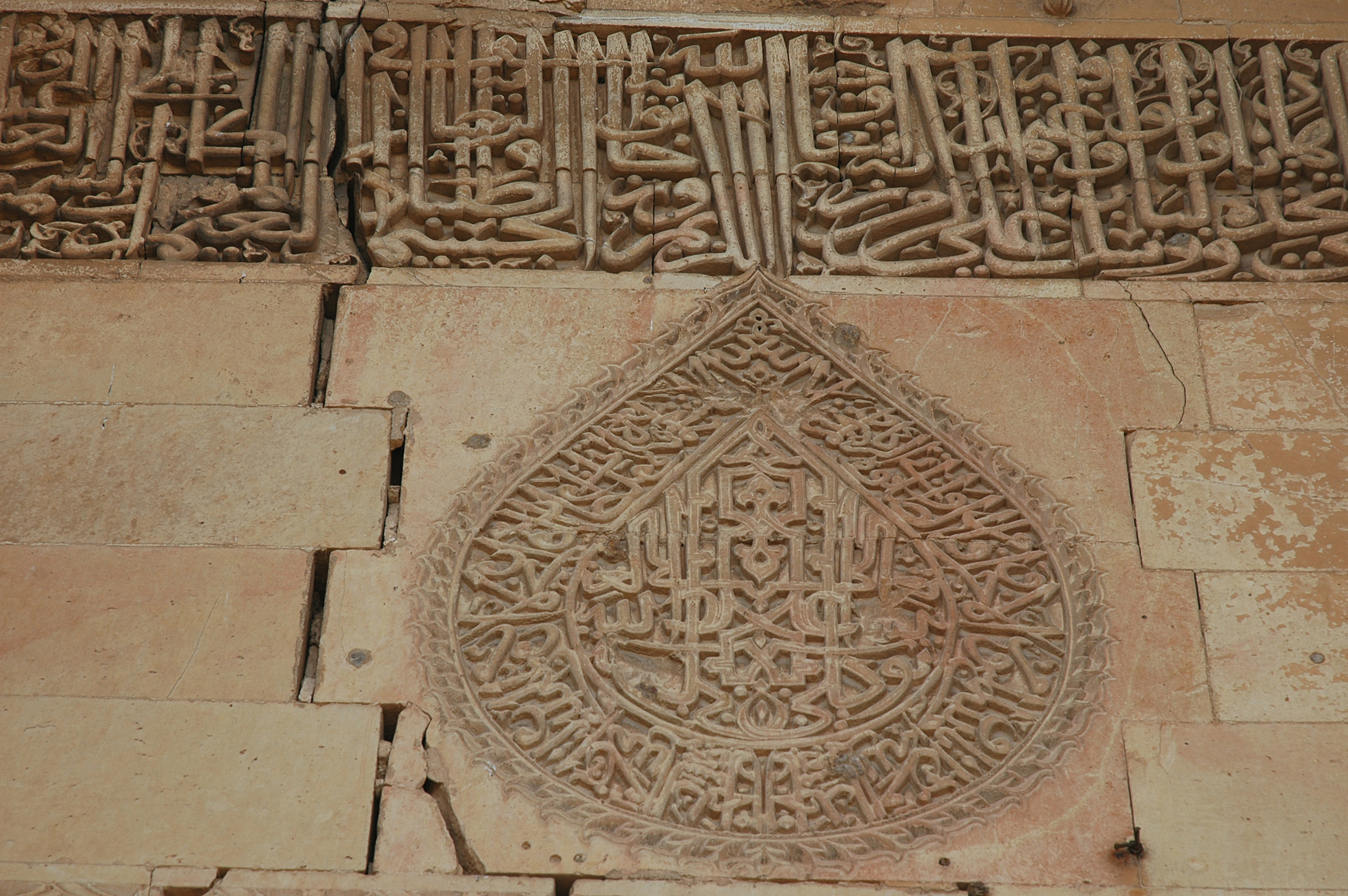
The carved foundation inscription (above), and the teardrop medallion (below) containing a symmetrical calligraphic composition

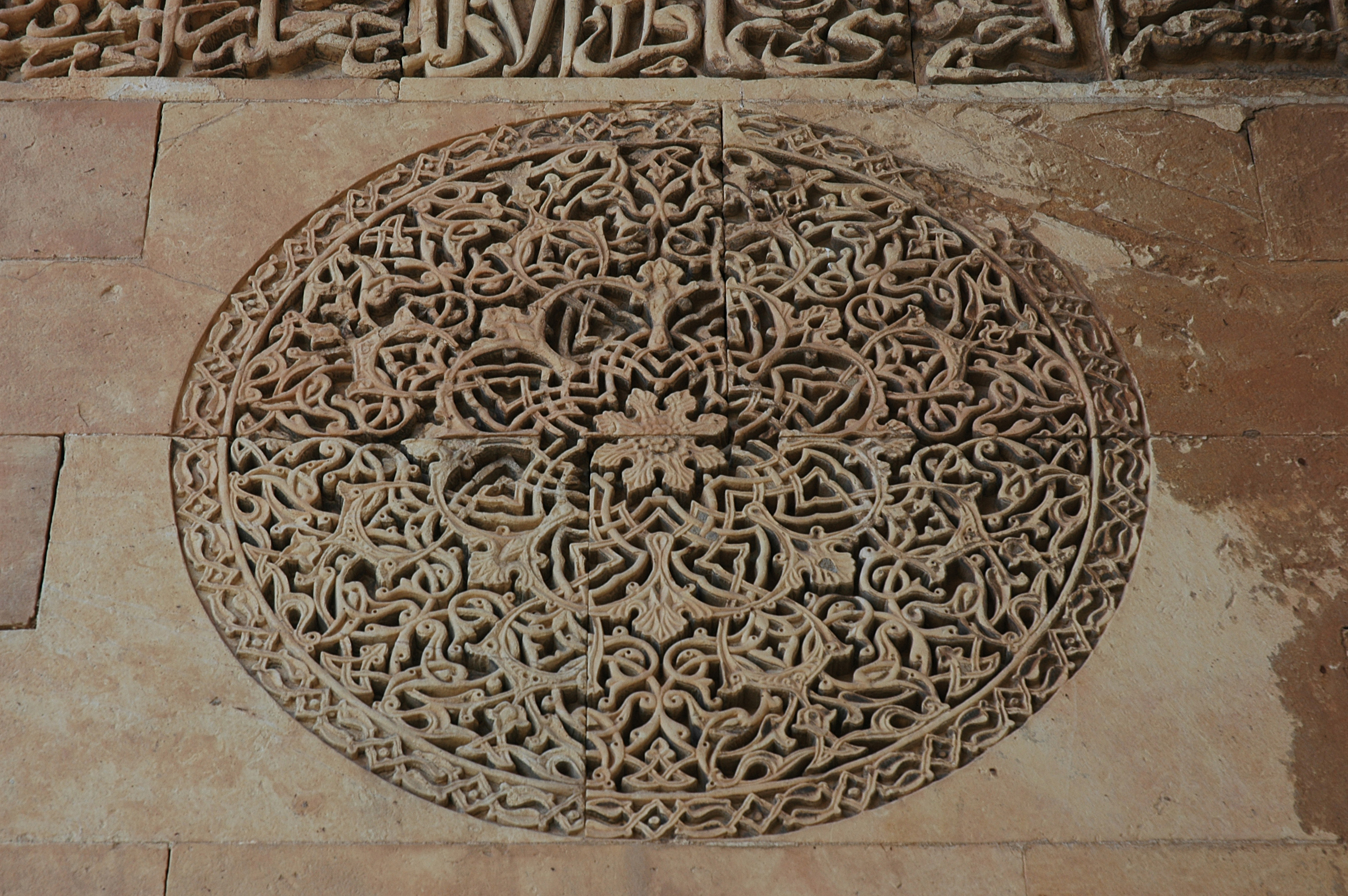
One of the arabesque medallions in the side of the portal

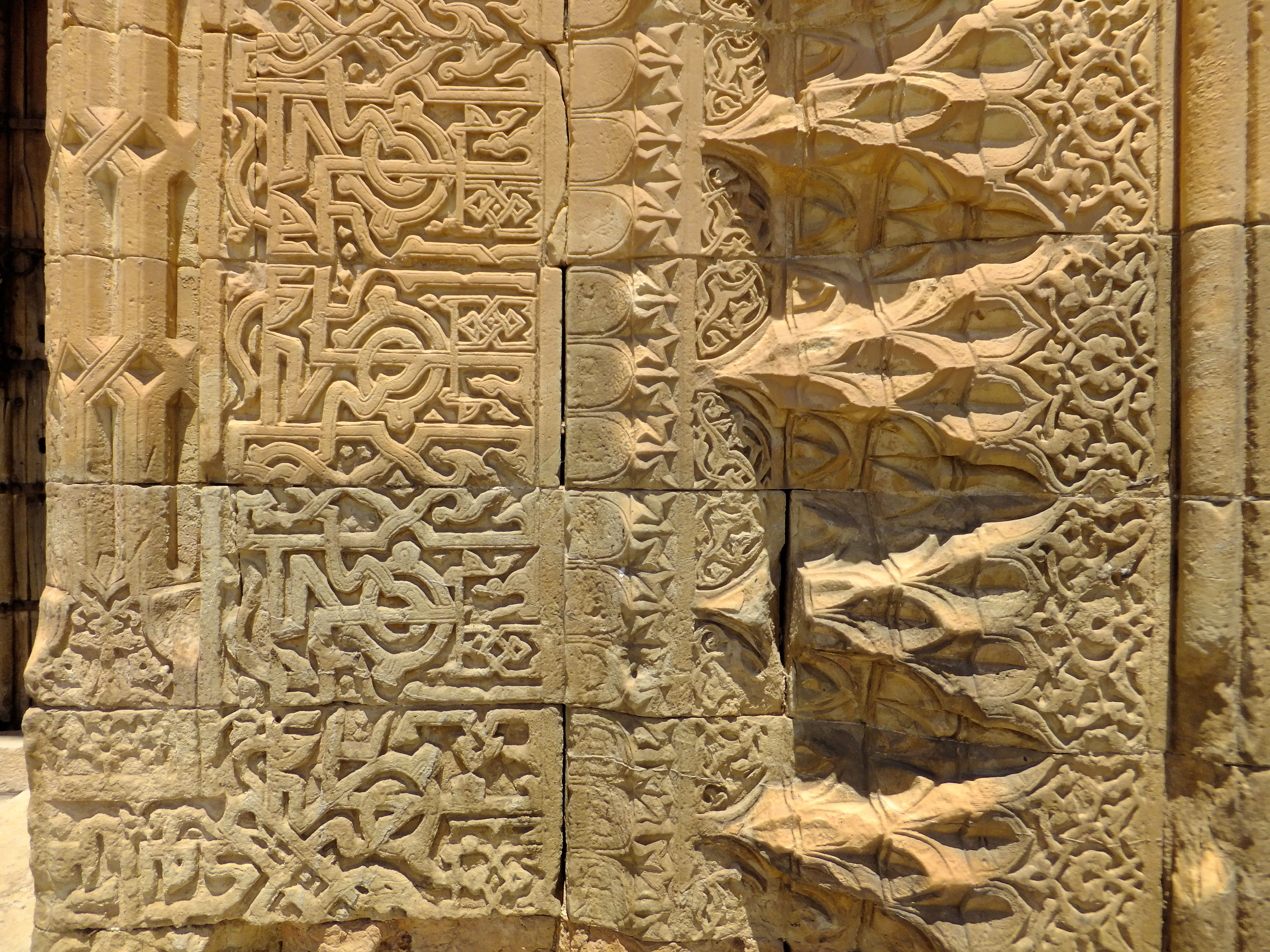
Decoration around the frame of the portal: Kufic calligraphy on the left and muqarnas corniche on the right

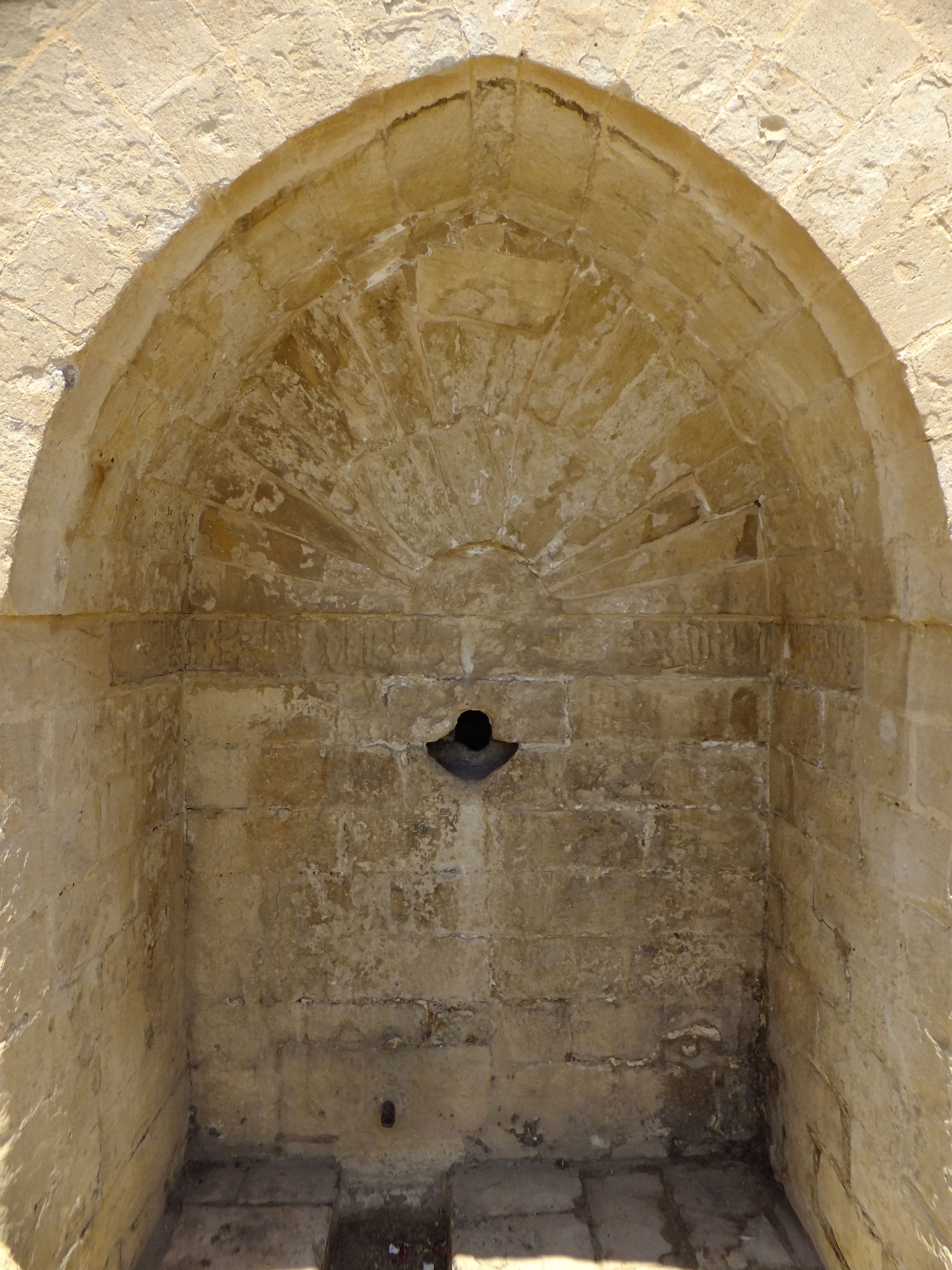
Small wall fountain in the middle of the street faâde

=== Interior ===
==== Entrance corridor ====
Upon entering, a corridor runs north until it reaches a corner covered by a star vault ceiling. On the left, the corridor continues to the west, past the mosque and to the ground-floor courtyard. Straight ahead, a stairway climbs north to the second floor. In the middle of the western corridor, on the north wall, is a niche covered by muqarnas canopy, opposite which is the entrance to the mosque chamber.

Entrance corridor

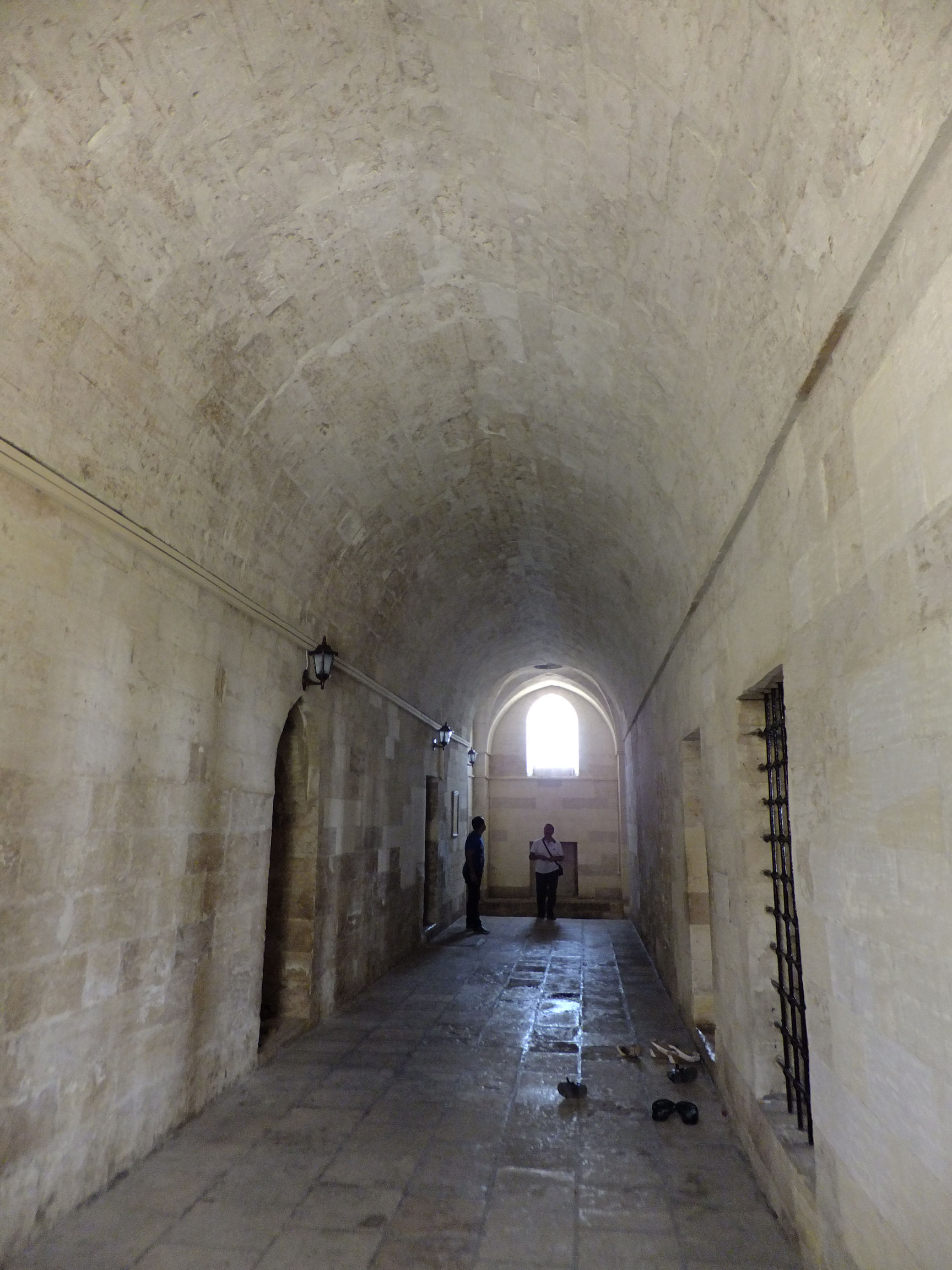
The corridor from the entrance to the courtyard (looking east, with the mosque entrance on the right)

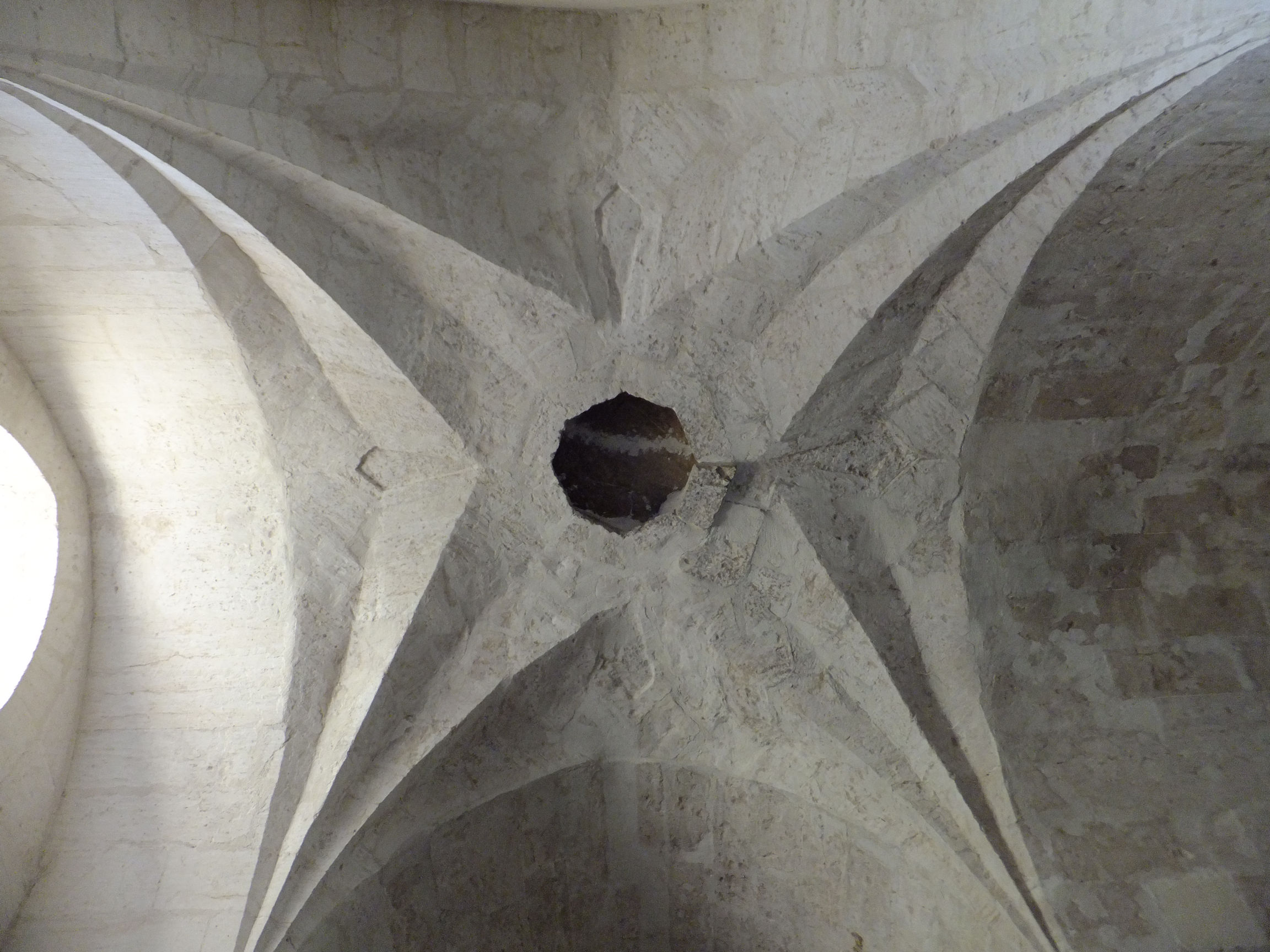
The star vault in the entrance corridor

==== Mosque ====
The mosque, accessed through a doorway on the south side of the ground-floor corridor, is a large rectangular chamber. It is divided into three square sections: the two on the sides are covered by groin vaults and the square space in the middle is covered by a dome. The dome transitions to the square space below it through the use of squinches sculpted into muqarnas corners with ablaq (two-coloured) stonework around them. The mosque is well-lit thanks to many windows. The mihrab niche is located in the middle of the south wall, directly opposite the entrance. The niche is topped by a plain semi-dome which is framed by carved relief decoration on the wall around it, including an inscription band around the arch, arabesques in the spandrels, a rectangular frame filled with a geometric motif, and ablaq stones. The entrance doorway, opposite the mihrab, is set inside a small recess surrounded by decoration very similar to that of the mihrab, except that instead of a plain semi-dome it is topped by a muqarnas canopy. The nearby minbar (pulpit) to the west of the mihrab is made of stone. Above both the doorway and the mihrab is a teardrop medallion similar to the one in the entrance portal, featuring the same phrase again in a symmetrical calligraphic composition, but in a smaller scale and with a different design. Much of the masonry of the mosque, except for the decorated parts, was restored in a later period.

The mosque chamber

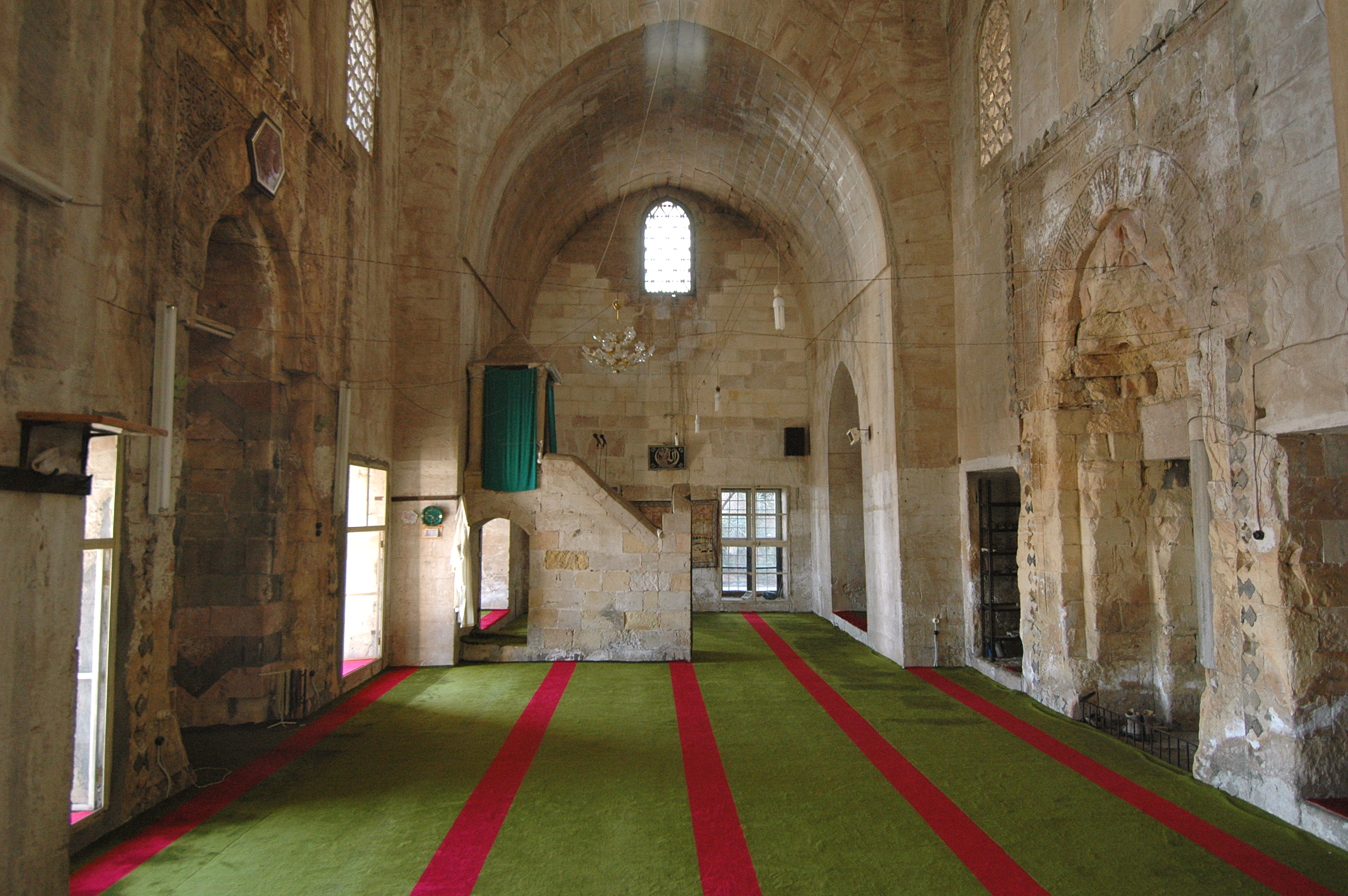
View of the mosque's prayer hall, with the mihrab on the left and the entrance portal on the right. The minbar is also visible past the mihrab.

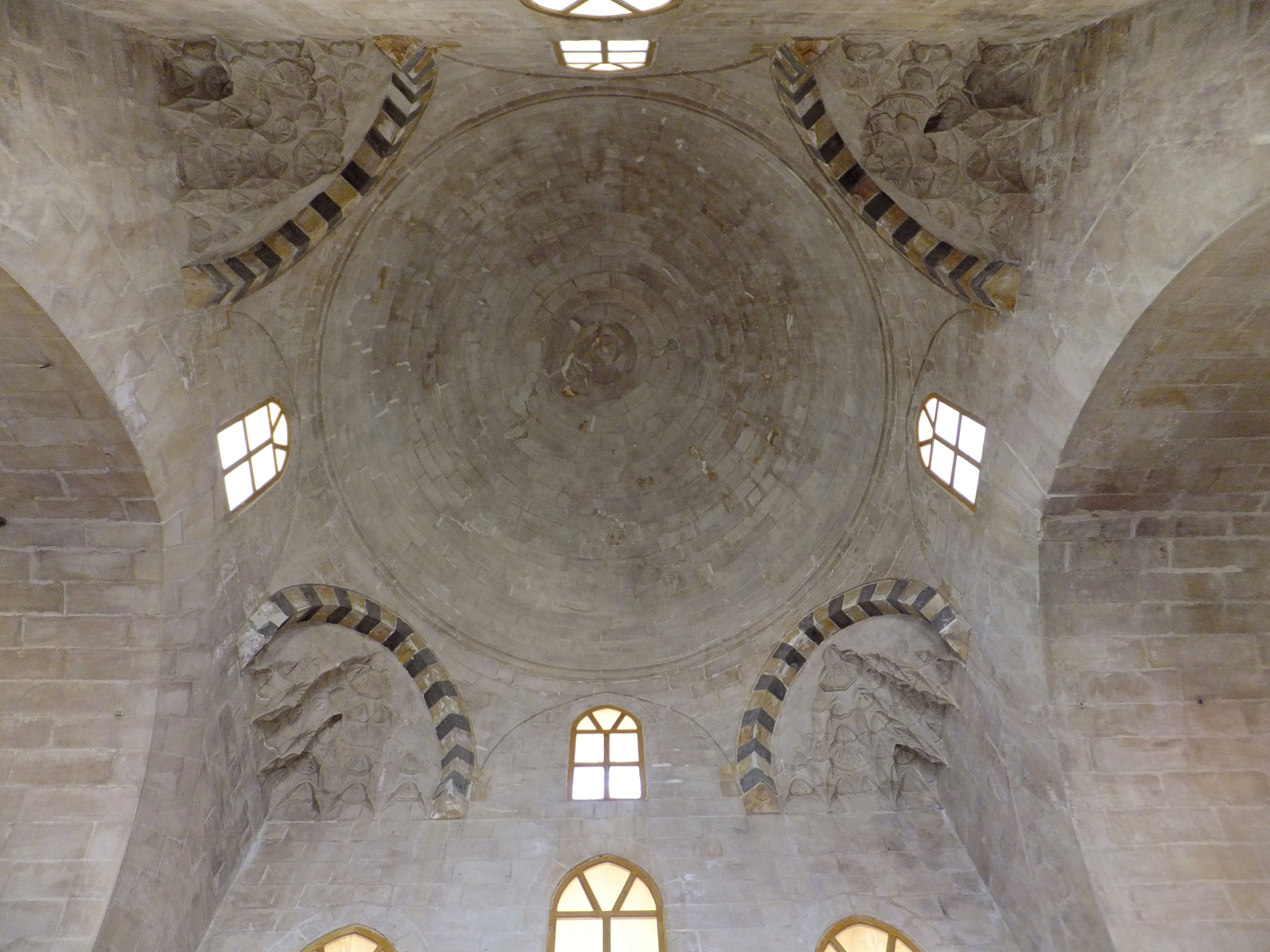
Dome over the center of the prayer hall

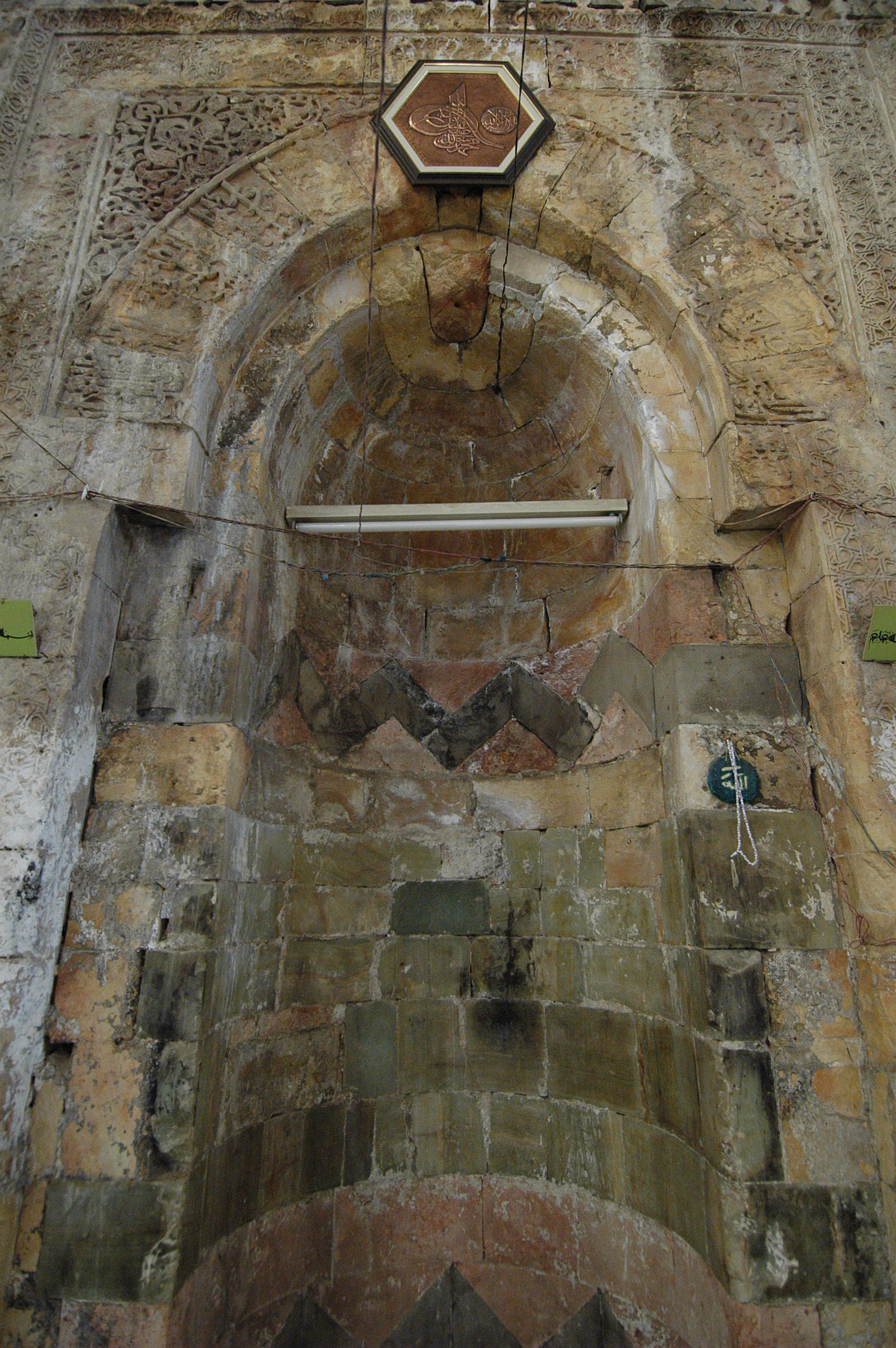
The mihrab of the prayer hall, on the south side

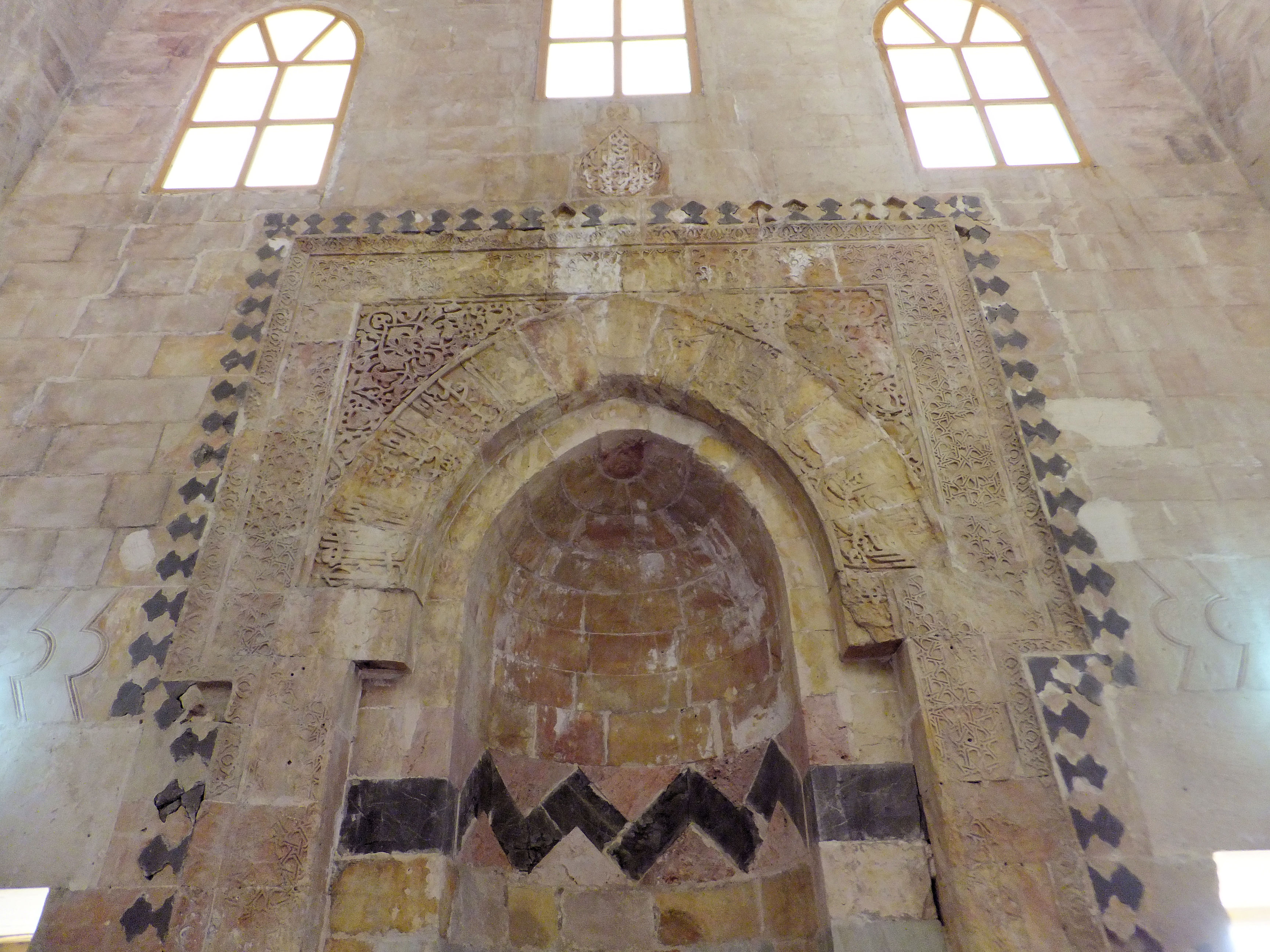
Decoration around the mihrab

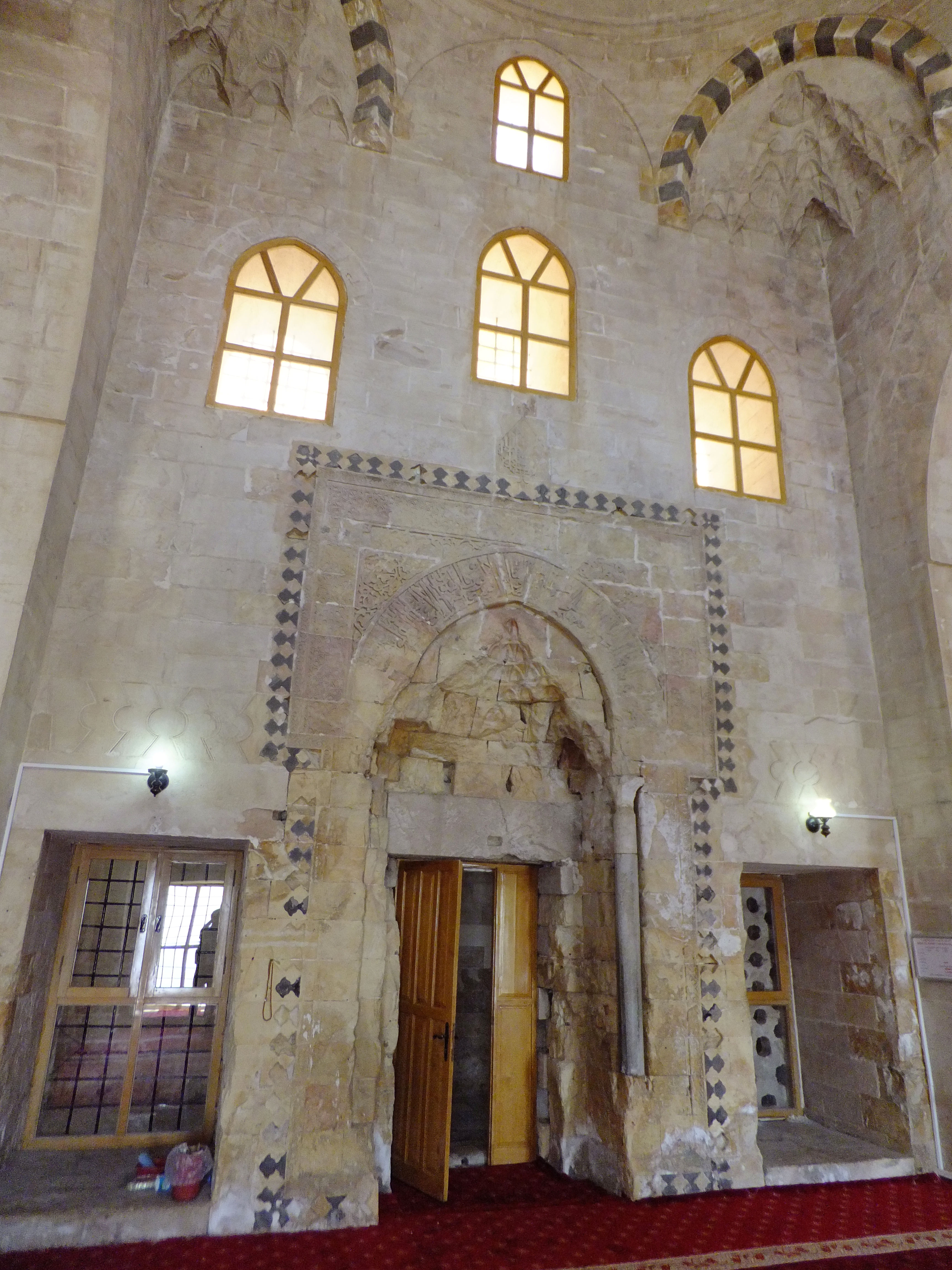
Entrance of the prayer hall, on the north side

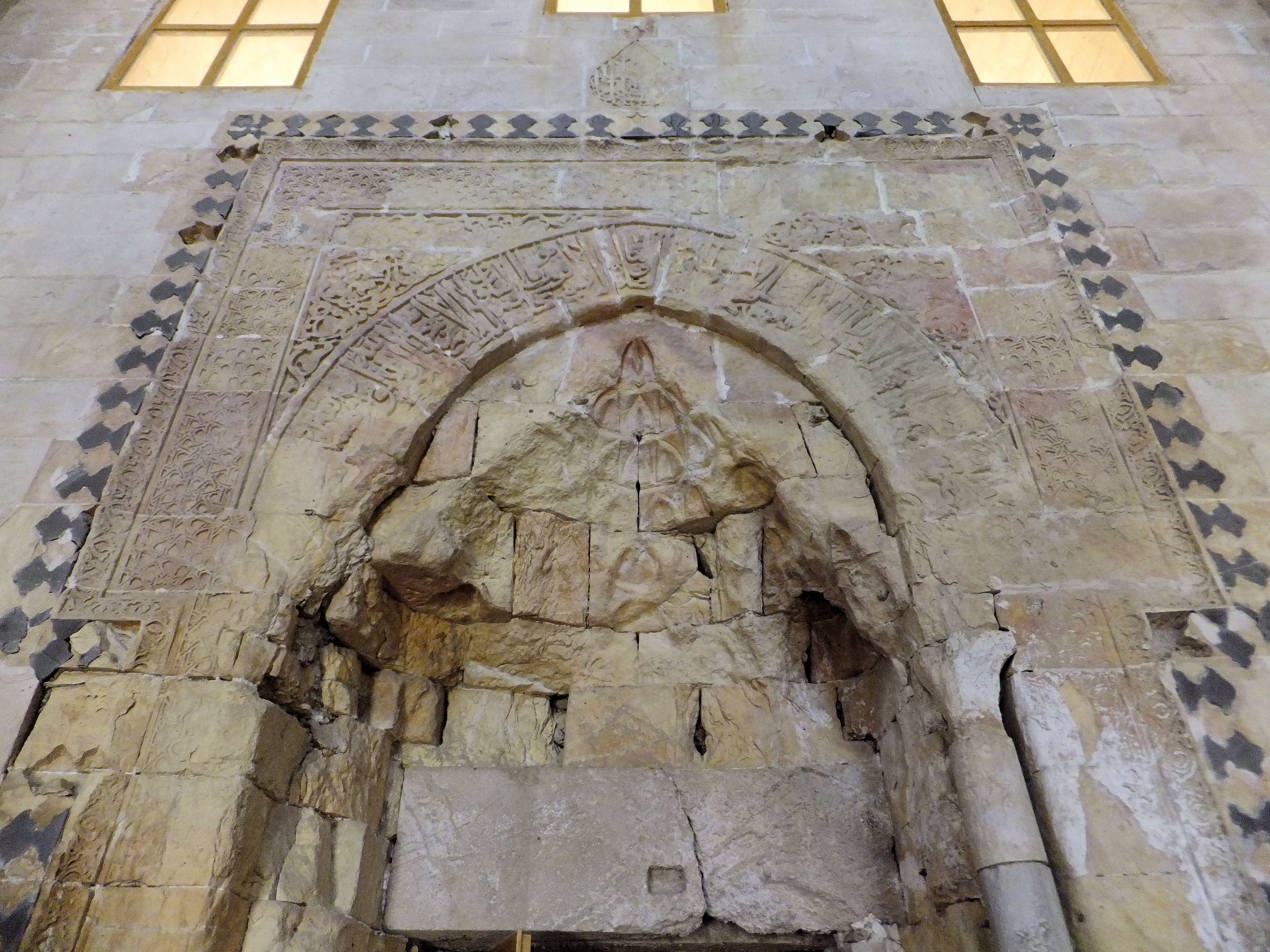
Decoration around the entrance

==== Courtyard ====
The large ground-floor courtyard, to the west of the mosque, occupies the center of the complex. The corridor from the entrance is accessed through a recessed portal on the east side, while directly opposite this, on the western side, is another recessed portal leading to a passage and vestibule chamber that leads to the mausoleum. Both portal recesses are vaulted with a muqarnas canopy. The center of the courtyard is occupied by a rectangular water basin. To the north of this basin is a central iwan (vaulted space open on one side). At the back of the iwan is a wall fountain, framed by ablaq decoration, which feeds a water channel in the middle of the floor that empties in the courtyard's pool. On either side of the iwan are two large chambers, accessed through side corridors from other parts of the building. From the western chamber a passage and stairway grants access to the upper level of the complex. The windows between the iwan and these side chambers were pierced during the Ottoman period. On the south side of the courtyard runs a vaulted portico and gallery which gives views onto the city and landscape below. In the middle of this gallery, on the south wall, is a small mihrab consisting of a plain niche with simple semi-dome. This gallery was once covered by more ornate star vaults but these have not survived and have been replaced by plain groin vaults. On the north side of the courtyard, above the iwan and the chambers, is a terrace accessed from the upper floor and overlooking the courtyard.

Main courtyard, ground level

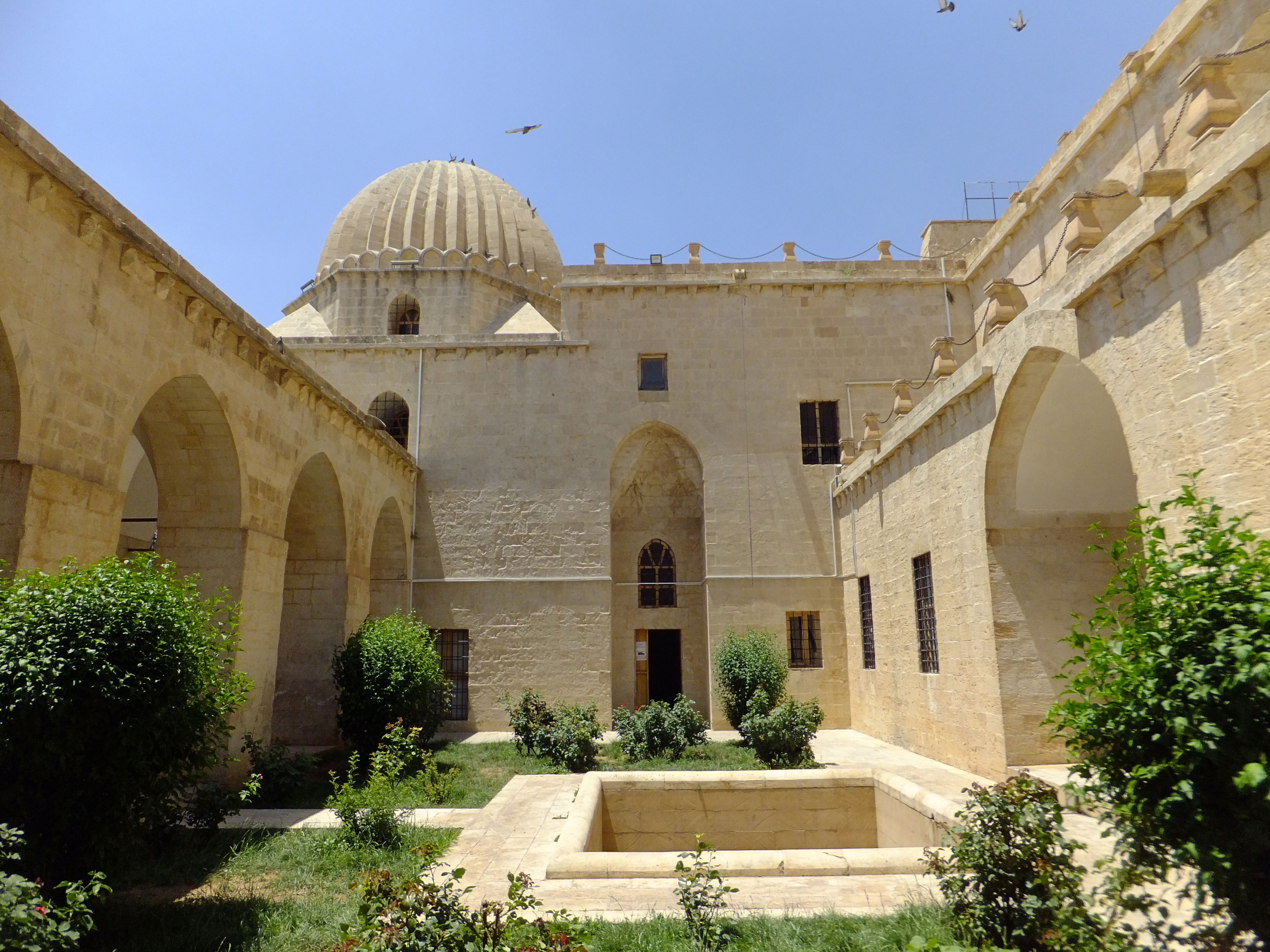
View of the main interior courtyard, looking west towards the mausoleum section

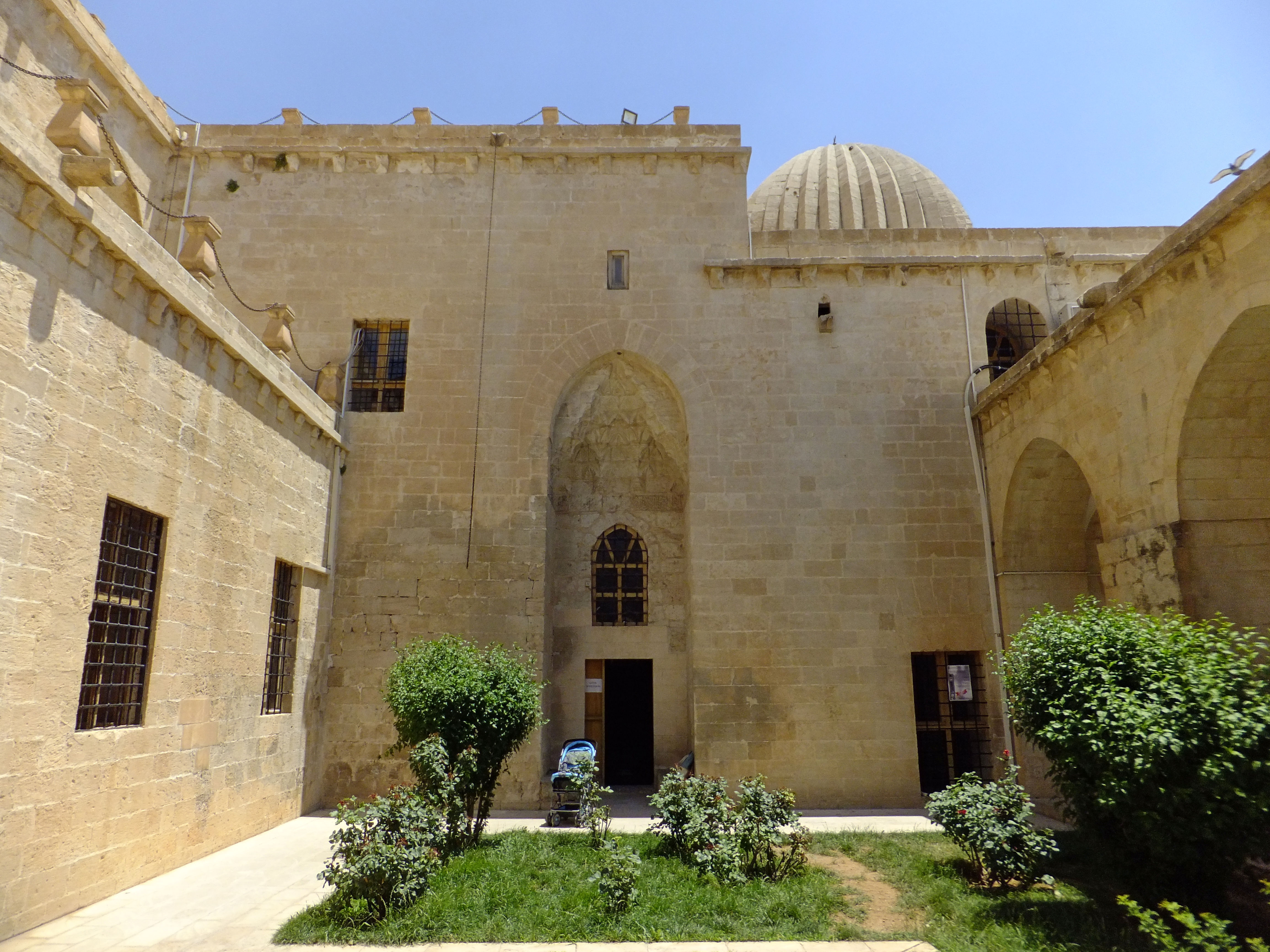
Main courtyard, looking east towards the mosque section

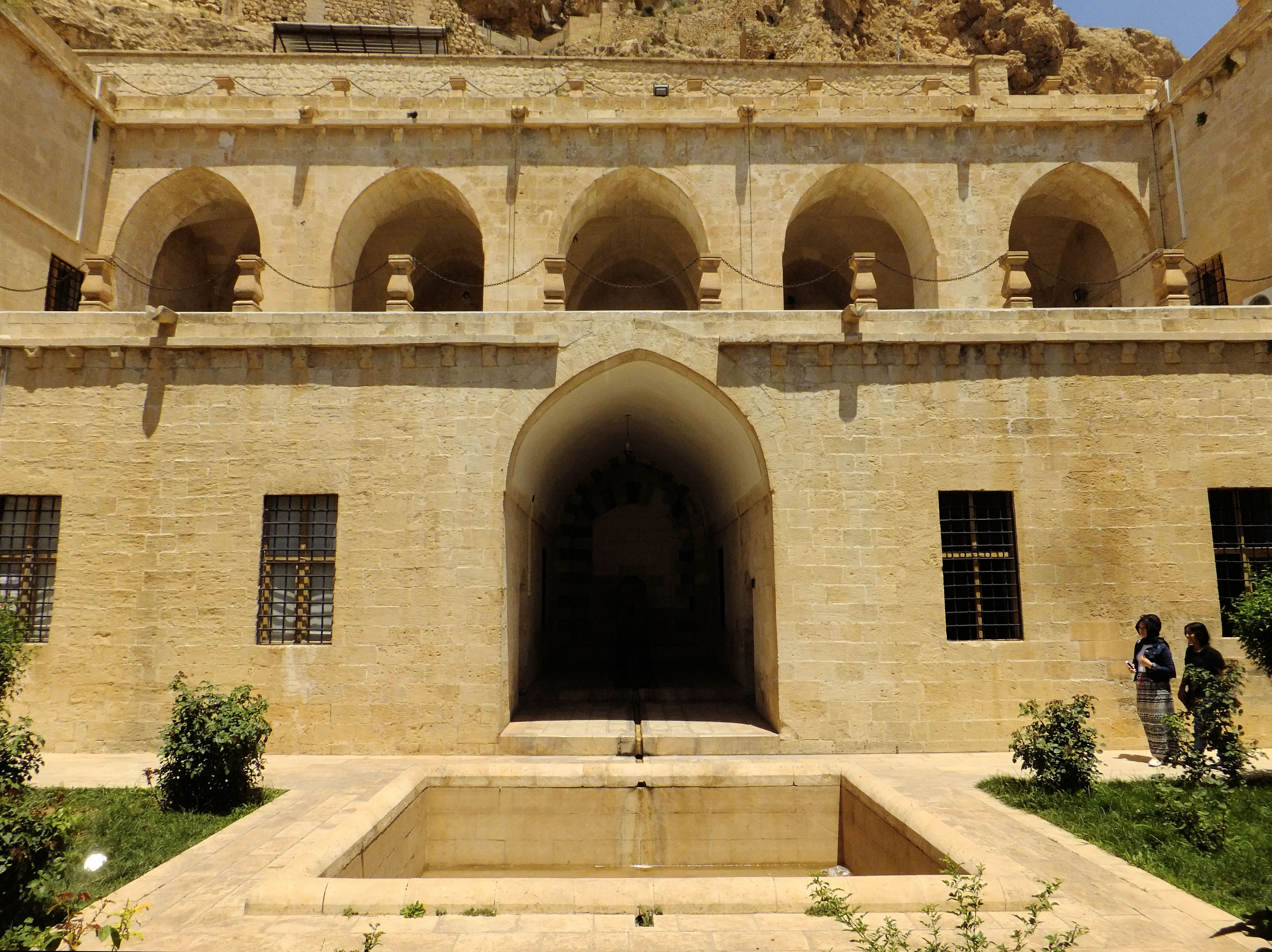
View of the main courtyard, looking north to the central iwan and the terrace of the upper floor

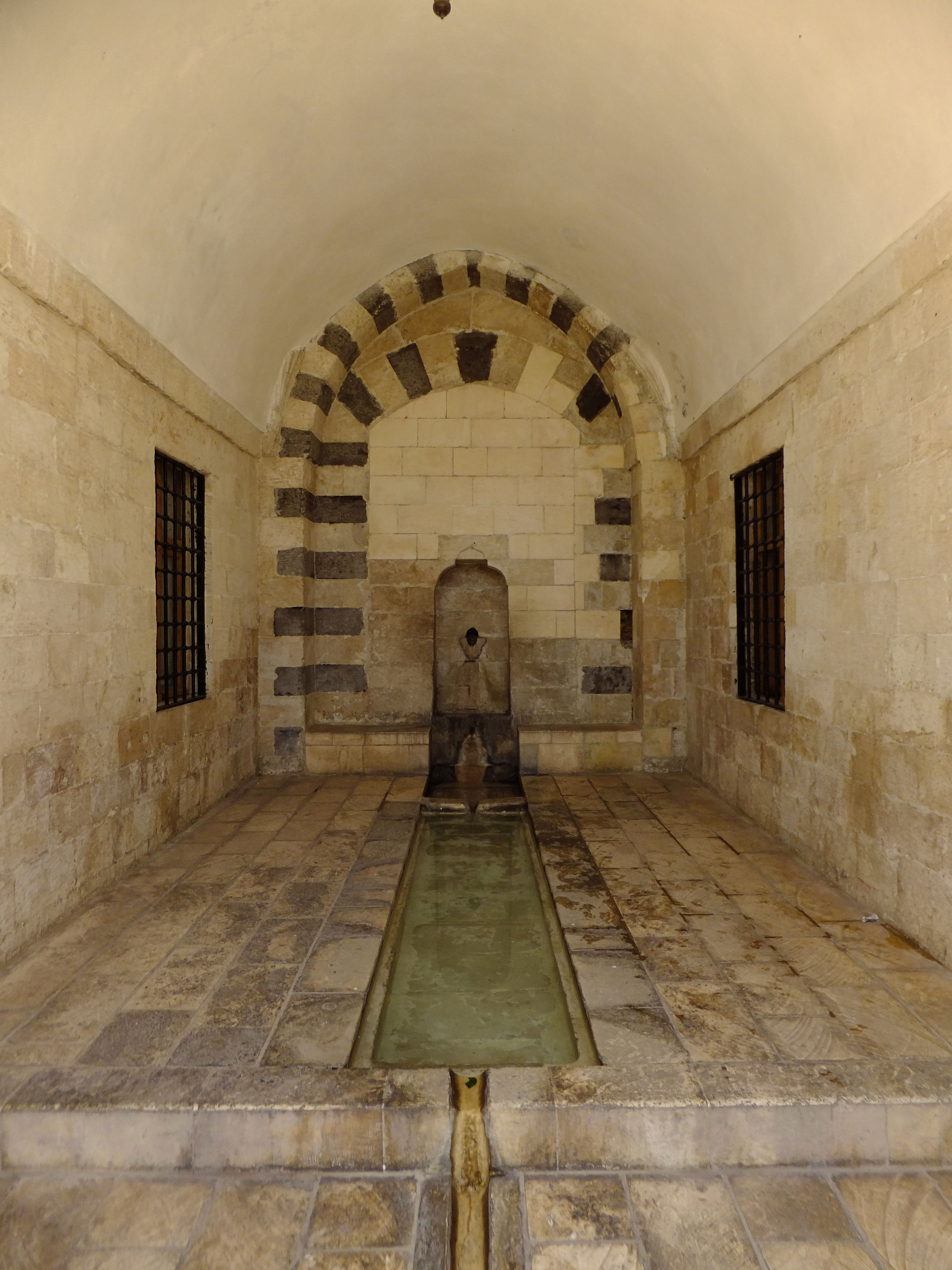
Inside the iwan, with wall fountain at the back and water channel in the middle

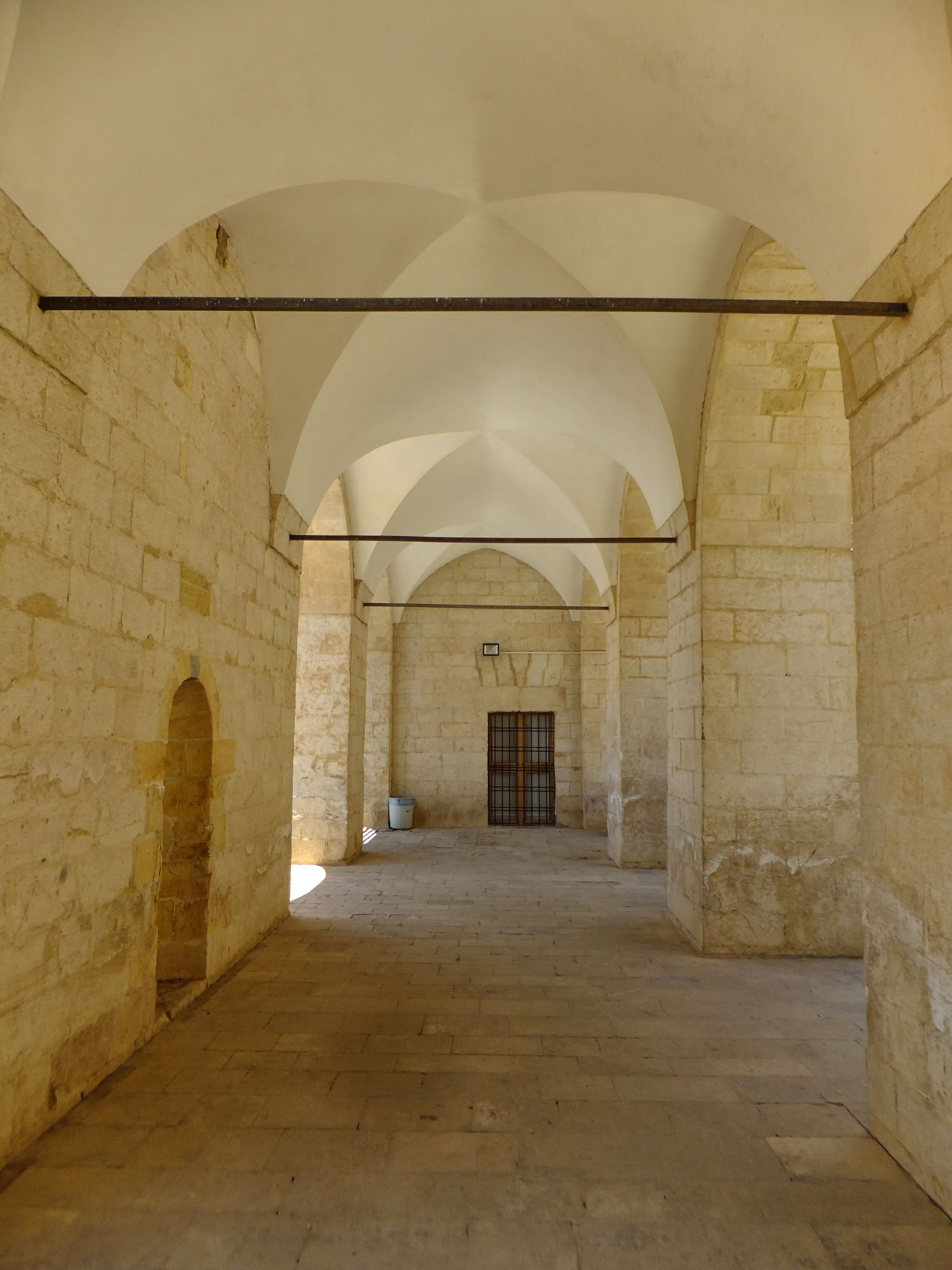
Southern gallery of the courtyard (with reconstructed ceiling)

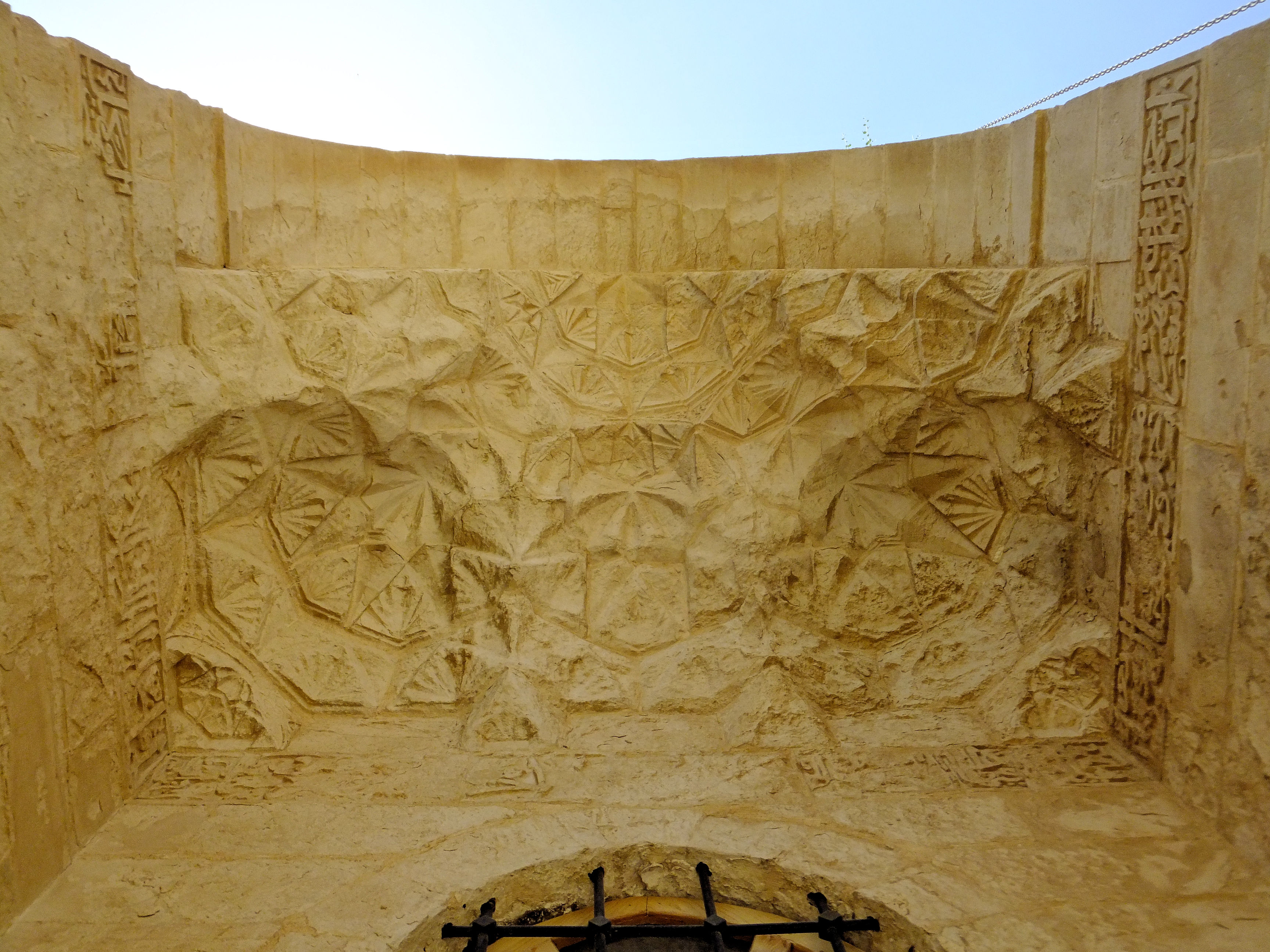
Detail of muqarnas canopy in the western portal of the courtyard

==== Mausoleum ====
The mausoleum at the southwest corner of the building is a square domed chamber. The mausoleum has been significantly restored, including the dome and its now plain squinches, but it has preserved its general character. In the middle of the south wall, opposite the doorway, is another mihrab. Both the doorway and the mihrab are decorated very similarly with ablaq stonework. The darker stone used for this decoration is generally basalt. Sultan Isa was never buried here, and the chamber was recently used as part of the Mardin Museum. A side chamber or vestibule to the north, preceding the mausoleum, contains a sarcophagus or cenotaph which has been there since at least the end of the 20th century.

Mausoleum chamber

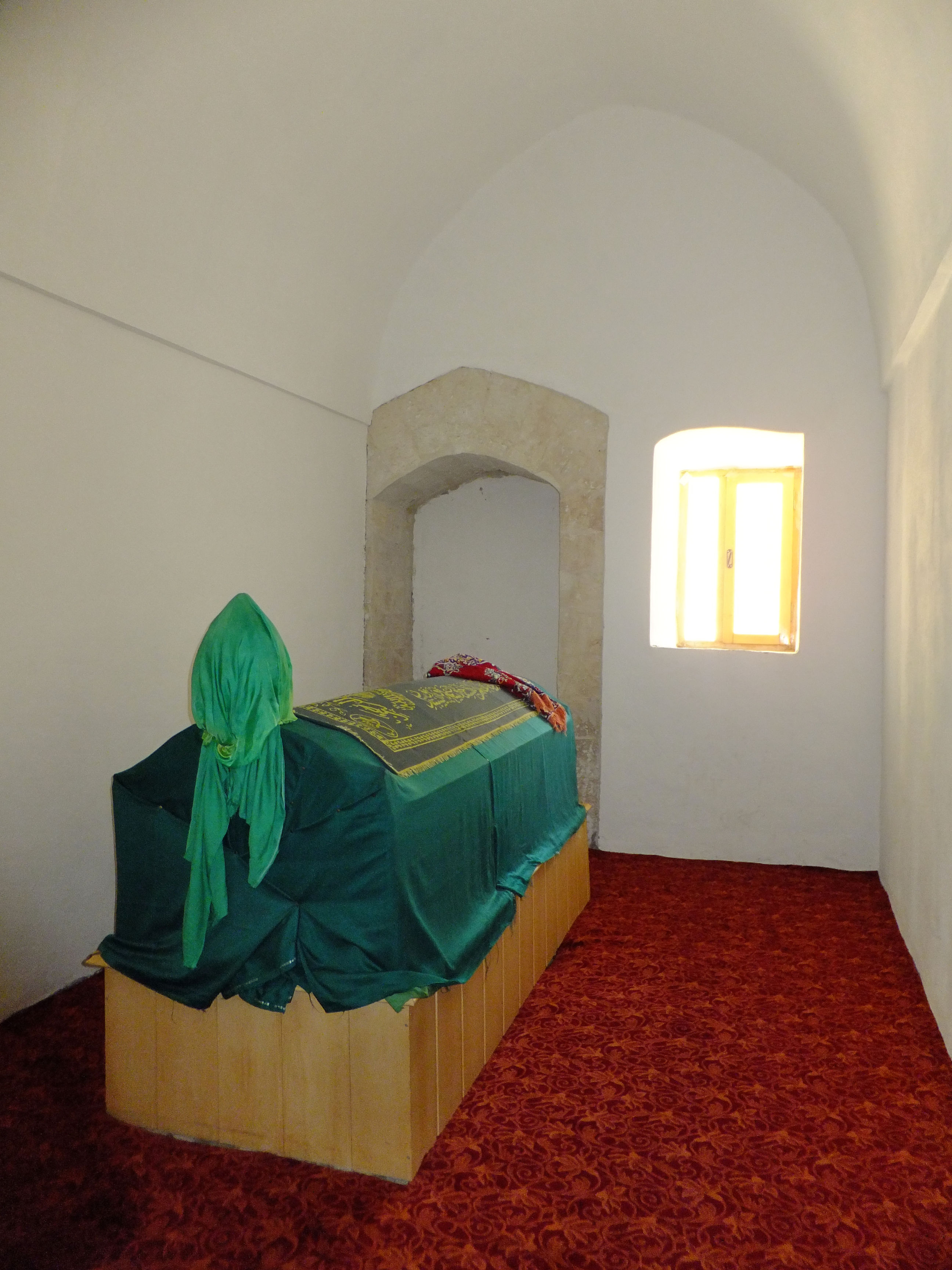
Cenotaph in a side chamber near the original domed mausoleum

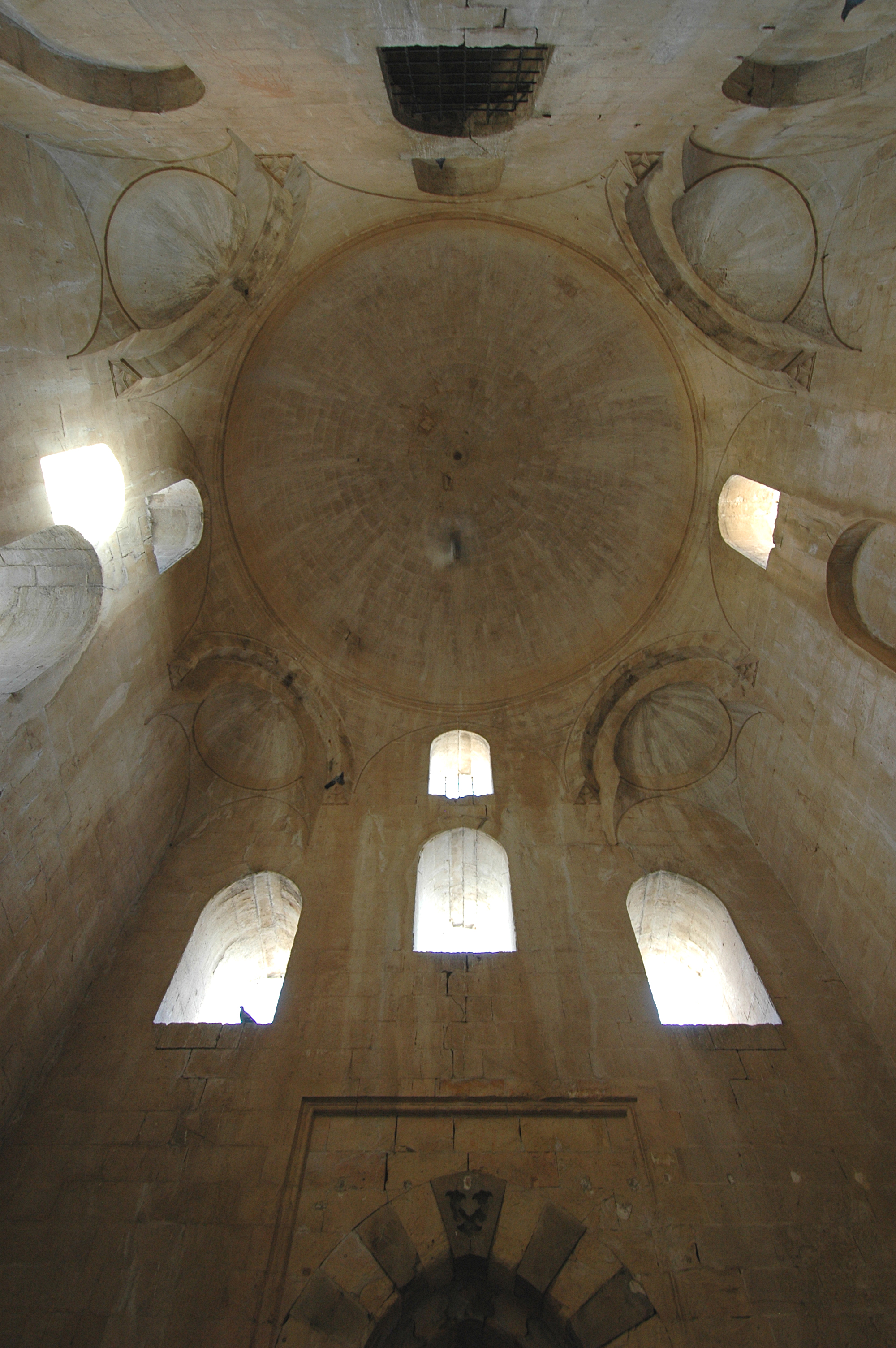
Dome of the mausoleum chamber

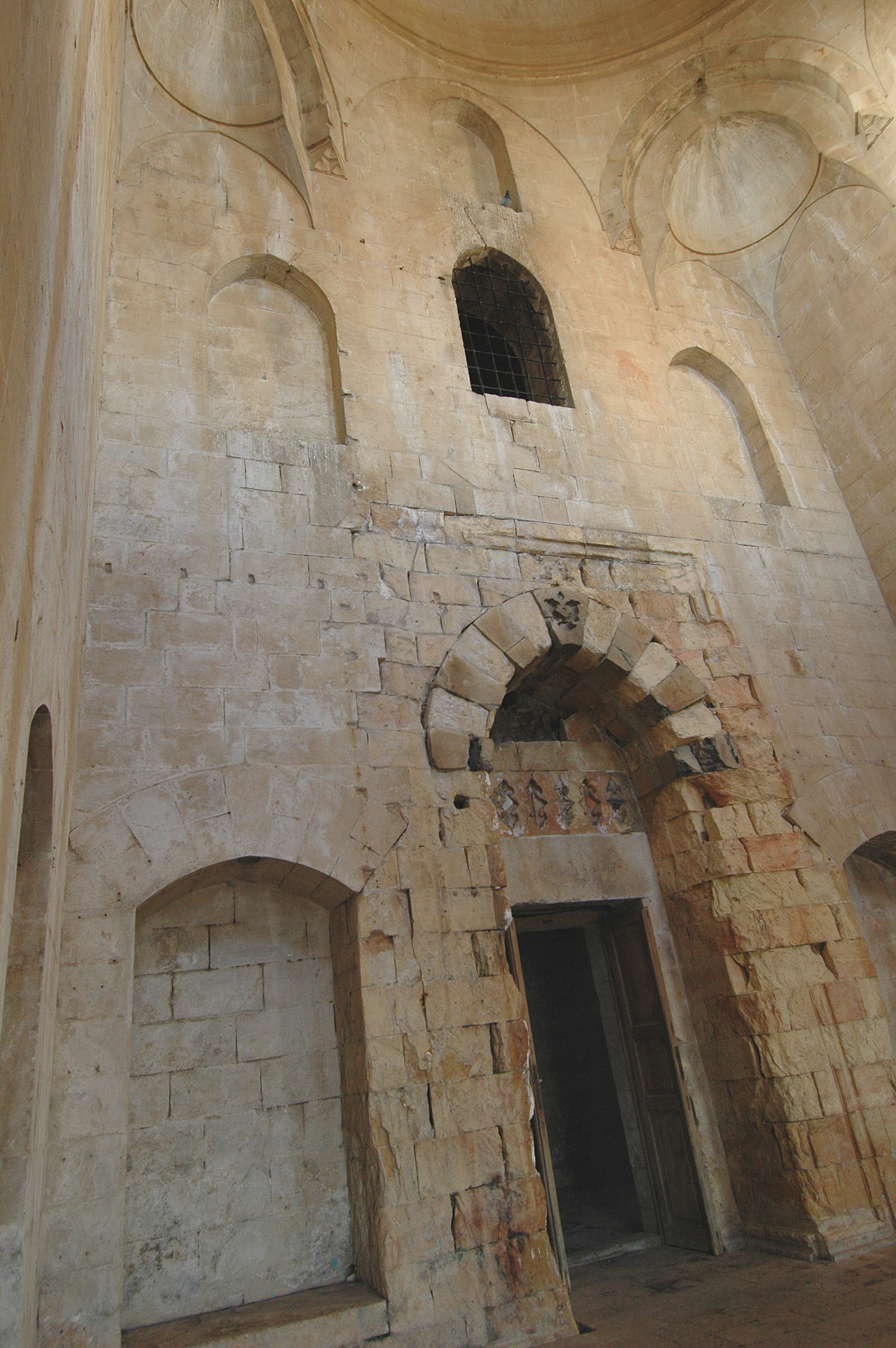
Mausoleum chamber, looking at the entrance doorway and northern wall

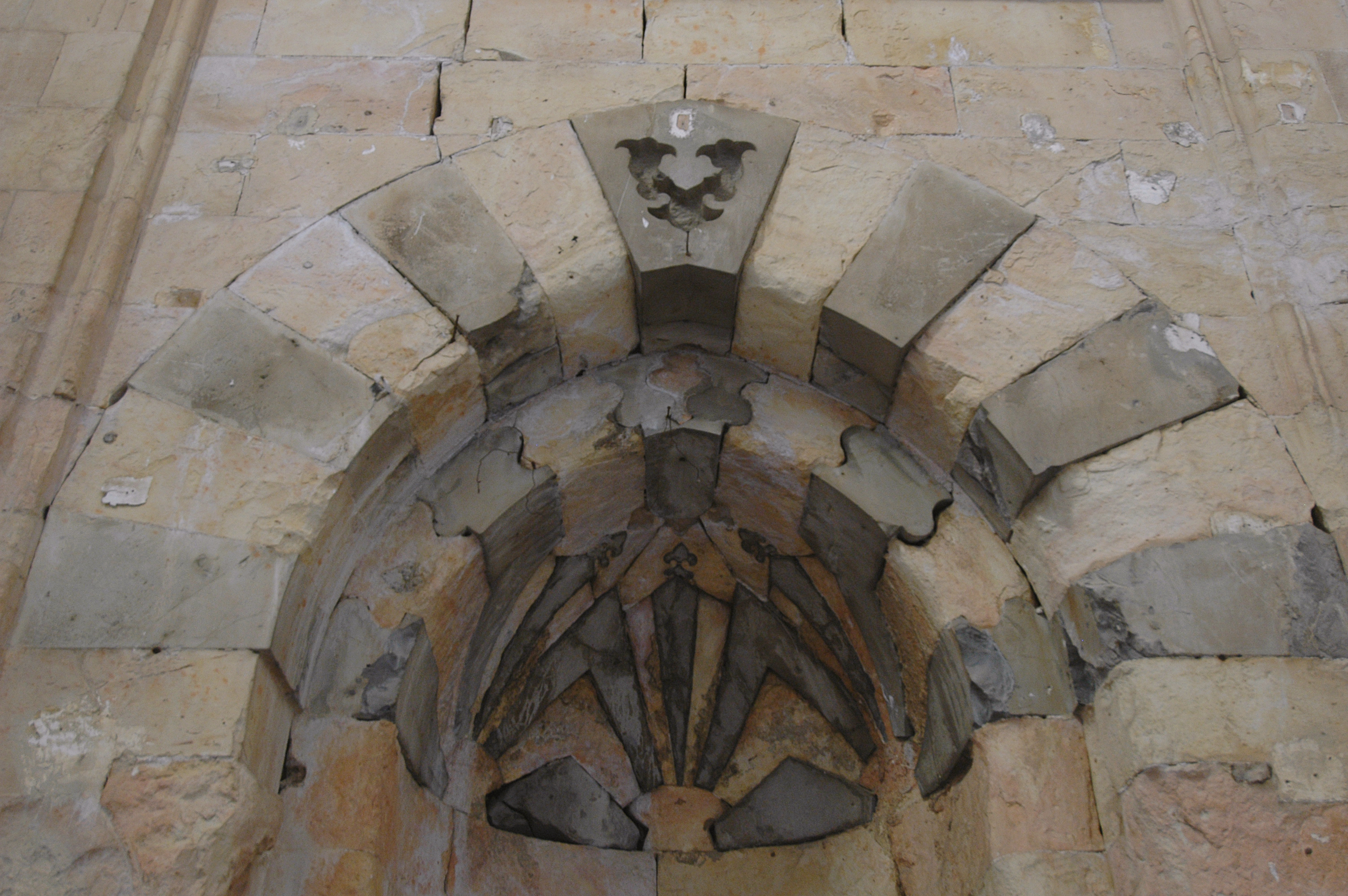
Detail of the ablaq stonework of the mihrab on the south side of the chamber

==== Upper level ====
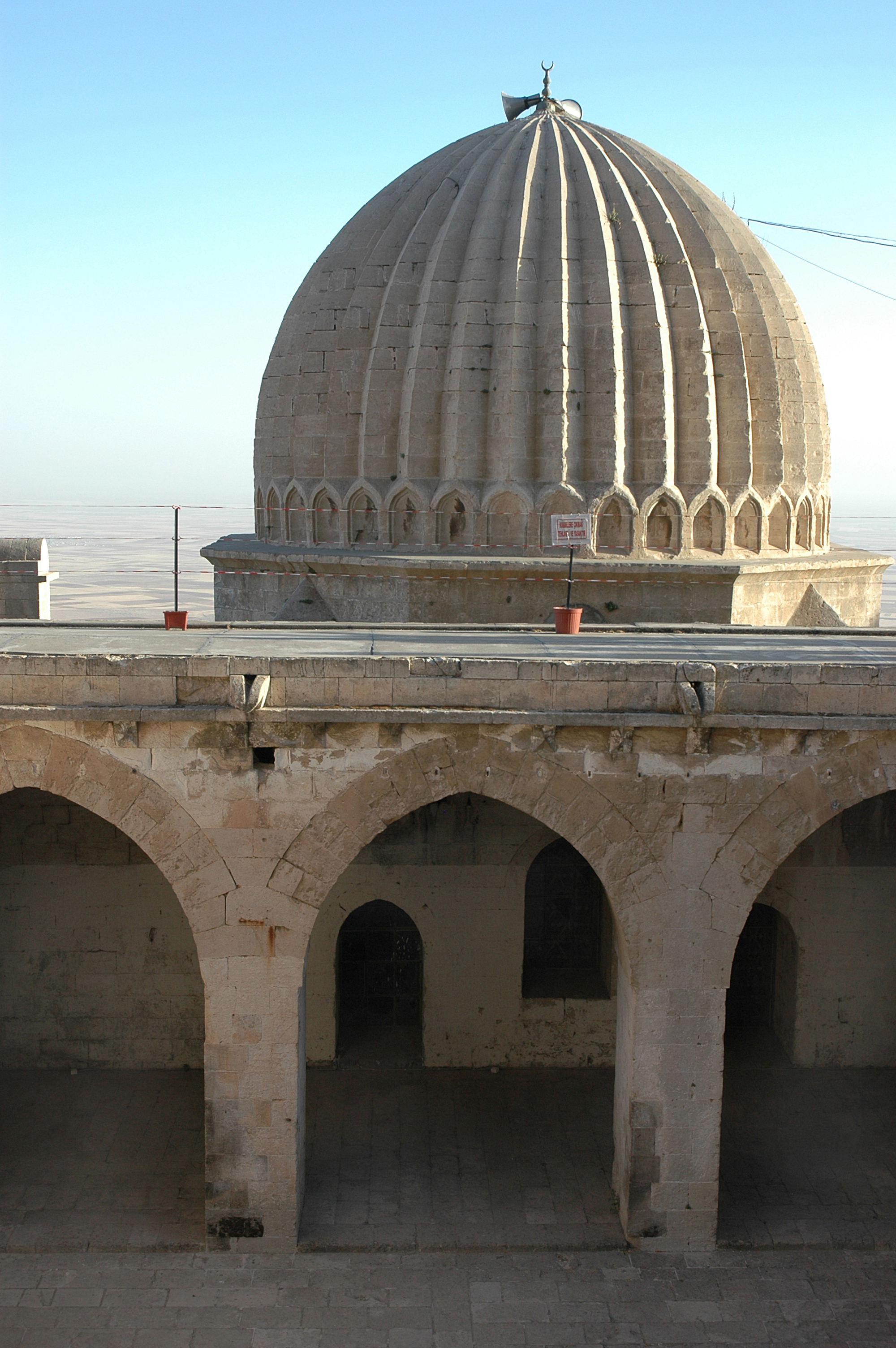
View from the rooftop into the second courtyard on the upper level, with the dome of the mosque behind

The upper floor is accessed through either the western staircase or the eastern staircase near the entrance (both mentioned above). The eastern stairway leads to the second courtyard of the complex, located north of the mosque area. The courtyard is surrounded on all sides by a portico and a series of rooms, which may have served as cells or bedchambers for the students of the madrasa, although scholar Thomas Sinclair states that the rooms of the upper floor seem to have served other purposes instead. The western part of the upper level is occupied in part by a terrace overlooking the ground floor courtyard (already mentioned above). The north side of this terrace, at the back, is occupied by a vaulted gallery and portico which was ruined by the 1950s and subsequently restored.

== Restorations ==
Zinciriye Madrasah has a long history of restoration from the Ottoman to the Republican period. Although the interventions made during this process contributed to the physical preservation of the structure, they have caused some discussions in terms of the balance between originality and intervention. The first major documented intervention dates back to 1797. This repair is clearly stated in the inscription on the summer mihrab located in the south portico of the madrasah. The inscription states that the structure was in ruins and was repaired. This shows that the structure was still considered a functional and valuable monument during the Ottoman period.

When we move on to the Republican period, the first recorded intervention dates back to 1949. The inscription from this period is documented with the inscription “Osilek 1949” on a wall facing the segmented dome of the mosque. A comprehensive restoration process was then carried out between 1963 and 1966. During this period, the upper floor porticos were rebuilt, the plasters, door and window joinery were renewed, and the structure was used as a dormitory for students. It is noteworthy that local Armenian and Assyrian stonemasons took part in the repairs; this shows that traditional stonemasonry has been passed down from generation to generation.

The interventions in 1967 focused particularly on the completion of the iwan porticos. The technical infrastructure of the repair was established by preparing the survey and restitution projects of the madrasah. However, it was later understood that some architectural elements of the structure were actually built in previous repairs. For example, it was revealed during the research conducted during this period that the courtyard porticos, which were thought to be original, were built in 1797 and the upper floor porticos in the 1960s.

The intervention, which was classified as a “simple repair” in 2006, brought about significant changes in practice. All facades of the madrasah were rasped, and as a result, the patina on the stone surfaces was lost. In addition, an ornamental pool, which was not original, was added to the courtyard. No traces from previous periods were found in the excavations carried out for this pool. There is no information about the pool in either archaeological data or the oral tradition. This situation shows that the intervention was carried out without documentation and historical reference.

A conservation project was prepared and proposed to be implemented in 2008, which was approved by the Diyarbakır Cultural Heritage Preservation Board following the reactions. This project included the restoration of the fountain on the original street facade and the removal of the pool. Unfortunately, despite its approval, this conservation project was not put into practice. Another problem encountered during the restoration process was the lack of sufficient documentation. In particular, the lack of documents related to the Republican period repairs made it difficult to understand past interventions. Documentation studies conducted with photographs of the structure before and after 2006 helped to eliminate this deficiency to some extent. However, the fact that even the Republican period inscription on the dome drum was not included in the conservation projects, for example, reveals the seriousness of the lack of documentation.

Before the current interventions, the structure was also used as an Archaeology Museum for a short time in 1981 and appropriate interior arrangements were made. This shows that the structure could be adapted to different functions throughout history. Although such adaptations ensured the continuity of the structure, the originality of some architectural elements has been lost over time. The materials and techniques used in the protection of the structure are also remarkable. The use of local basalt stone and traditional mortar was continued in the restorations, and an attempt was made to preserve the original stonework style. However, some modern materials used in the intervention in 2006 made both aesthetic harmony and longevity questionable.

The restoration process of Zinciriye Madrasah also reflects the general problems of conservation practices in Türkiye. Issues such as planning, lack of documentation, discussions on authenticity and lack of supervision in implementation are clearly observed in this example. In particular, the fact that the 2008 conservation project has not yet been implemented reveals that control over the structure is inadequate. When all these interventions are evaluated together, it is seen that the restorations that Zinciriye Madrasah has undergone have been successful in bringing the structure to the present day, but they contain some problems in terms of documentation, authenticity and intervention ethics. Interdisciplinary approaches should be adopted in future studies, and local people and experts should be included in the process. In addition, the building should be both protected and maintained with sustainable use strategies.
