= Majd al-Din Isa Al-Zahir =

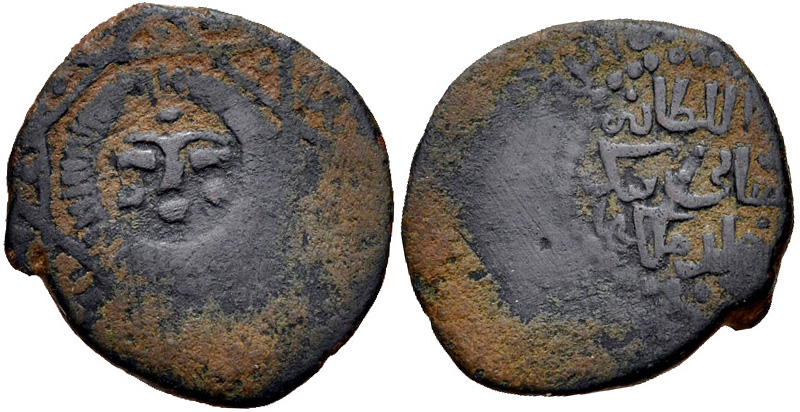
- Coinage of Majd al-Din Isa Al-Zahir. Sunface in the center of a hexagram. Name and titles of al-Zahir in three lines.

Emir of Mardin
- Reign: 1376–1407
- Predecessor: Al-Muzaffar Fakhr al-Din Dāwūd II
- Successor: Al-Salih Şhihab al-Din Ahmad
- Issue: Al-Salih Şhihab al-Din Ahmad
- House: Artuqids
- Father: Al-Muzaffar Fakhr al-Din Dāwūd II

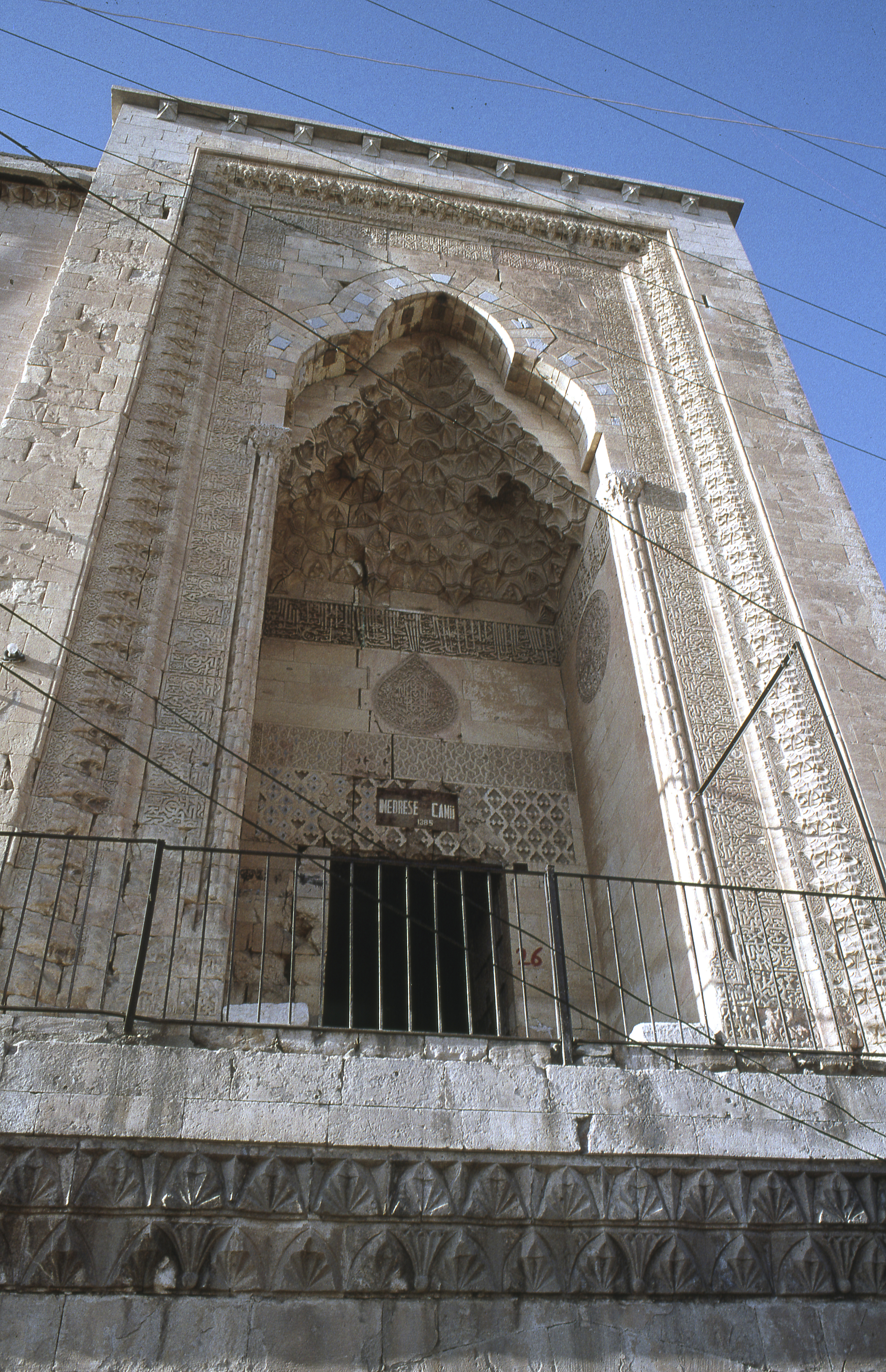
Main entrance portal of the Sultan Isa Medrese (1385)

Majd al-Din Isa Al-Zahir (r.1376–1407), often simply Isa, was the penultimate Artuqid ruler of Mardin, and the son of the previous ruler Al-Muzaffar Fakhr al-Din Dāwūd II (r.1367–1376). He ruled Mardin from 1376 to 1407.

Majd al-Din Isa Al-Zahir commissioned the Sultan Isa Medrese, a historic landmark and former madrasa in Mardin, its construction being completed in 1385.

Under his rule, the Mardin branch of the Artuqids were to fall under the Qara Qoyunlu ruler Qara Mahammad, as he invaded Mardin in 1384 and received the submission of Majd al-Din Isa Al-Zahir. From this point onwards, the Artuqids operated as a vassal state of the Qara Qoyunlu.

In 1394, Timur invaded the region and captured Mardin. Isa Al-Zahir submitted to Timurid suzerainty, but the region continued to be disputed between different powers.

The Qara Qoyunlu under Qara Yusuf captured Mardin and finally put an end to Artuqid rule in 1409.

Coins minted in Mardin in the Middle Ages during the city's rule by the Artuqid dynasty and the Mongol Empire are noted for prominently incorporating solar iconography, both in the form of the Lion and Sun emblem but also in the form of just the sun alone.

His son Al-Salih Şhihab al-Din Ahmad (r.1407–1409) would be the last Artuqid ruler, who was deposed by Qara Yusuf, and left for Mosul.

== Sources ==
- Bosworth, Clifford Edmund (2004). The New Islamic Dynasties: A Chronological and Genealogical Manual. Edinburgh University Press. ISBN 0-7486-2137-7.
