= Nur al-Din Muhammad =

12th-century Artuqid vassal ruler

- Emir of the Artuqids
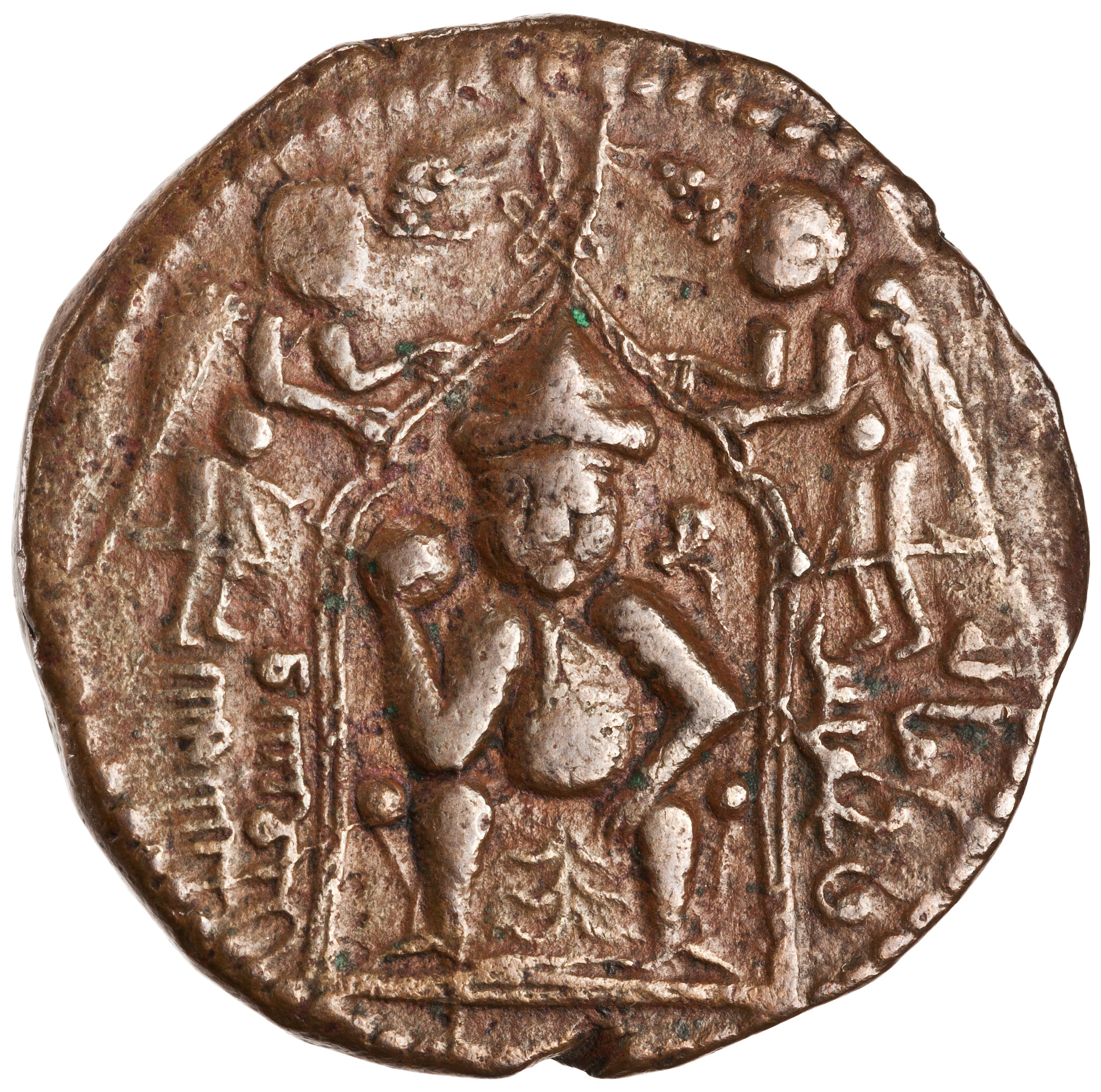
- Coin of Nur al-Din Muhammad enthroned, dated 576 H (1180–1181 CE)
- Rule: 1175 – 1185
- Predecessor: Kara Arslan
- Successor: Quṭb al-Din Sukmān
- Born: Syria
- Died: 1185; Syria
- Spouse: Seljuki Khatun bint Kilij Arslan (separated 1179), Unnamed wife or concubine.
- Children: Quṭb al-Dīn Sukman, Mahmud, Mawdud
Names
- Nur al-Din Muhammad bin Fahkr al-Din Qara Arslan
- Dynasty: Artuqid
- Father: Fahkr al-Din Qara Arslan
- Religion: Sunni Islam

Nur ad-Din Muhammad (r. 1175–1185 CE) was a member of the Artuqid ruler, and the son of Fahkr al-Din Qara Arslan (Kara Arslan).

== Biography ==
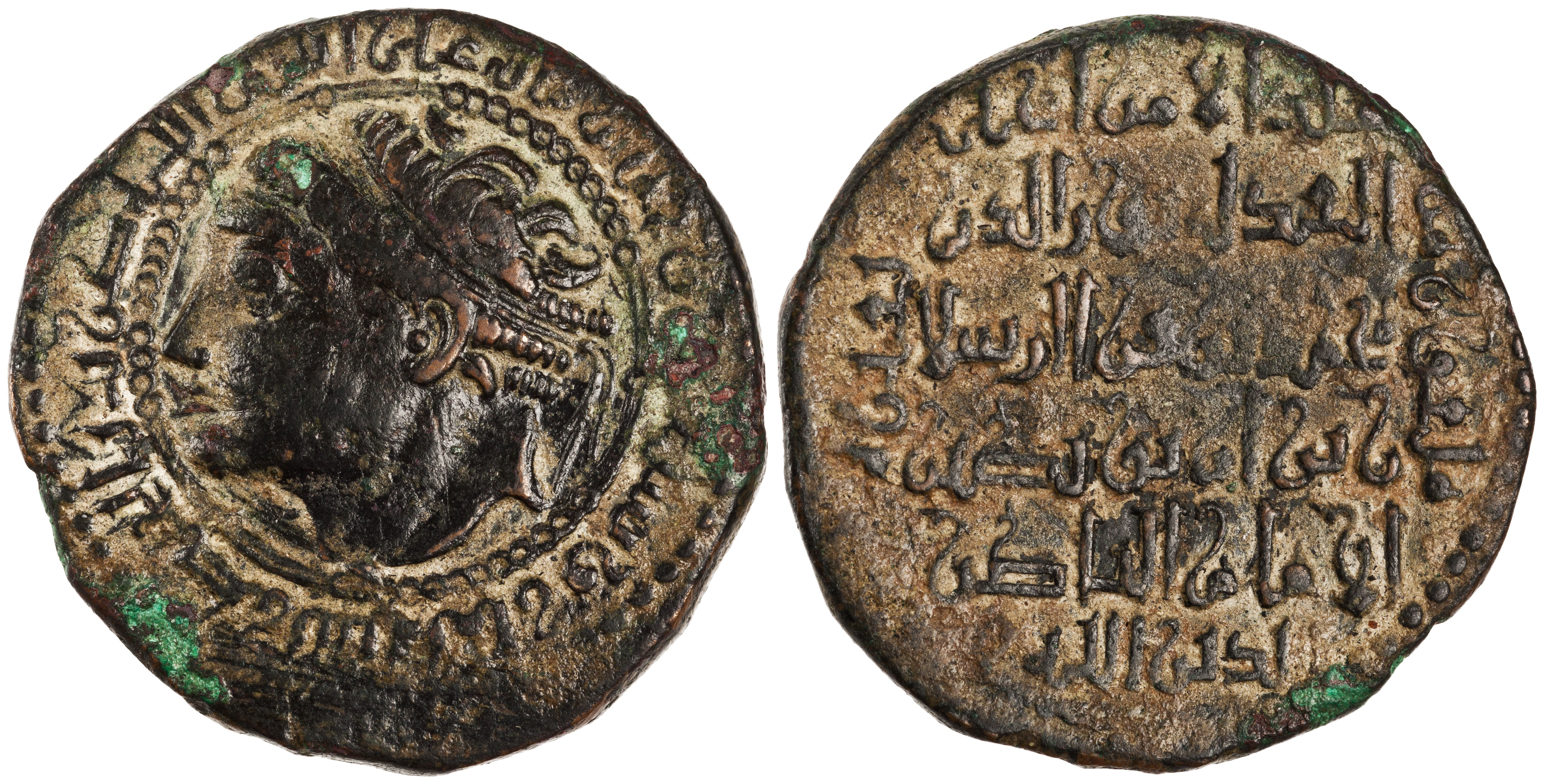
Coinage of Muhammad, al-Hisn, 578 H. Obverse: Ala'smi'llah duriba bi'l-Hisn written date around youthful Seleucid head. Reverse: Malik al-umara Muhiyy al-`adil Nur al-Din Muhammad bin Qara Arslan bin Artuq Nasir al-Imam al-Nasir li-din allah /Mal'un man yu'ayyiruhu - legend in beaded circle

Nur ad-Din Muhammad was the vassal Artuqid ruler of the Diyar Bakr, the northernmost region of Mesopotamia. He had married a daughter of Kilij Arslan II, the Sultan of Rum, but neglected her in favour of a singing girl. Angered, Kilij Arslan threatened Nur ad-Din, who sought the protection of Saladin in 1179.

Previously, Saladin offered to mediate relations between Nur al-Din and Kilij Arslan II—the Seljuk sultan of Rûm—after the two came into conflict. The latter demanded that Nur al-Din return the lands given to him as a dowry for marrying his daughter when he received reports that she was being abused and used to gain Seljuk territory. Nur al-Din asked Saladin to mediate the issue, but Arslan refused.

After Nur al-Din and Saladin met at Geuk Su, the top Seljuk emir, Ikhtiyar al-Din al-Hasan, confirmed Arslan's submission, after which an agreement was drawn up. Saladin was later enraged when he received a message from Arslan accusing Nur al-Din of more abuses against his daughter. He threatened to attack the city of Malatya, saying, "it is two days march for me and I shall not dismount [my horse] until I am in the city." Alarmed at the threat, the Seljuks pushed for negotiations. Saladin felt that Arslan was correct to care for his daughter, but Nur al-Din had taken refuge with him, and therefore he could not betray his trust. It was finally agreed that Arslan's daughter would be sent away for a year, and if Nur al-Din failed to comply, Saladin would move to abandon his support for him.

According to contemporary accounts, only a few months after their wedding, Nur al-Din Muhammad turned away from Seljuki Khatun and treated her badly. Ibn al-Athir (1160–1233/34) wrote:

“Nur al-Din Muhammad married the daughter of Kilij Arslan. She remained with him for some time, but then he fell in love with a singer and married her. He turned away from the daughter of Kilij Arslan and left her in neglect.”

Michael the Syrian (c. 1126–1199) also stated:

“A quarrel arose between Sultan Kilij Arslan and his son-in-law Nur al-Din because the latter divorced and drove away the Sultan's daughter because of a devilish love for a certain loose woman.”

The French translation is similar, but the English translation of the text differs somewhat:

“A war arose between the Sultan and Nur al-Din, because Nur al-Din hated his wife, who was the daughter of the Sultan.”

Bar Hebraeus (1226–1286) did not provide further details, writing:

“This man was the Sultan's son-in-law, and he committed a great folly with the Sultan's daughter and involved her in a situation of adultery.”

Historians have described the woman for whom Seljuk Khatun was rejected by her husband as either a singer or a dancer.

Unaccustomed to such neglect, the princess became indignant and wrote to her father.

When Sultan Kilij Arslan II learned of his son-in-law's treatment of his daughter, he immediately sent an envoy demanding that Nur al-Din either return the dowry or leave the singer. When no response was received, Kilij Arslan attacked his son-in-law. It is possible that Kilij Arslan intended to use this as a pretext for annexing the Artuqid territories. His army invaded Muhammad's lands.

Frightened, Nur al-Din sought help from Saladin, who sent a letter to Kilij Arslan. According to Ibn al-Athir, the Sultan repeated his demands to his son-in-law: Nur al-Din was holding several castles that formed part of the dowry and was required to return them. However, Saladin had already promised support to Nur al-Din Muhammad.

No agreement was reached between Kilij Arslan II and Saladin, and Saladin marched into Seljuk territory. C. Cahen wrote that Saladin campaigned against Kilij Arslan II and occupied Turkish Seljuk lands as far as Besni, after which Kilij Arslan agreed to Saladin's request for a settlement.

The Sultan wrote to Saladin describing how Nur al-Din had insulted his daughter and stating that he “would certainly have to go to his country and put him in his place”. Saladin became angry with the messenger who delivered the message. He ordered him to tell the Sultan that he was only two days away from Malatya:

“Tell your master: I will not get off my horse until I reach there, and then I will attack his entire country and take it from him.”

The following day, the Sultan's vizier, Ikhtiyar al-Din Hasan, wrote to Saladin requesting a meeting, and Saladin granted permission. Ikhtiyar al-Din Hasan arrived and said:

“I speak on my own behalf, not on behalf of my master, and I ask you to forgive me. Such a disgraceful matter does not befit a Sultan such as you.”

Ikhtiyar al-Din Hasan reminded Saladin that people expected him to wage jihad, rather than fight a Muslim ruler. He also said:

“Imagine that Kilij Arslan had died and that his daughter had sent me to you seeking refuge.”

After hearing him, Saladin replied:

“By God, you are right! But this man, Nur al-Din, came to me. I cannot abandon him now.”

Saladin suggested that Ikhtiyar al-Din Hasan meet Nur al-Din Muhammad himself and reach an agreement with him. Saladin also promised to tell Muhammad that he was acting wrongly. At the meeting, it was agreed that Muhammad would part with the singer within a year. If he failed to do so, he would receive no assistance from Saladin. Apparently, Nur al-Din Muhammad did indeed send the woman away. Bar Hebraeus dated the conflict to 1180.

In 1183 Saladin granted him the recently conquered Amida in return for his assistance against Mosul.

=== Death and remarriage of his wife ===
When his estranged wife arrived in Baghdad from Mecca after Hajj, news came that her husband, Nur al-Din Muhammad, had died in 1185. The caliph proposed Seljuk Khatun for marriage. She was uncertain about marrying the Caliph, but al-Nasir ordered her to be brought to the palace and married her. Thus his widow became wife of his overlord, the caliph al-Nasir. Al-Nasir sent an honourable escort for her. She arrived in Baghdad, where the marriage was concluded, and the Caliph presented her with jewels “worthy of caliphs and rulers”.

== Bibliography ==
- Lyons, M. C.; Jackson, D. E. P. (1982). Saladin: the Politics of the Holy War. Cambridge University Press. ISBN 978-0-521-31739-9.
- Mecit, Songül (2014). The Rum Seljuqs: evolution of a dynasty. Routledge studies in the history of Iran and Turkey. London ; New York: Routledge, Taylor & Francis Group. p. 106. ISBN 978-0-415-50540-6.
- Michael the Syrian; R. A. Huseynov (1987). "From the "Chronicle" of Michael the Syrian (Part 5)" (PDF). Written Monuments of the East: Historical and Philological Studies (Annual 1978–1979). Moscow: Nauka, GRVL: 45–56.
- ابن جبير (Ibn Jubayr). رحلة ابن جبير (The Travels of Ibn Jubayr). بيروت (Beirut).
- ʻIzz al-Dīn Ibn al-Athīr (1965). الكامل في التاريخ. Vol. 9, 10. Dar Ṣáder.
- Bar Hebraeus (1932). Chronography. Translated by E. A. Wallis Budge. Gorgias Press.
- Ibn al-Sāʿī (2017). "29. Saljūqī Khātūn". In Shawkat M. Toorawa; the Editors of the Library of Arabic Literature (eds.). Consorts of the Caliphs: Women and the Court of Baghdad. NYU Press. pp. 69–70. ISBN 978-1-4798-6679-3.
- Michel le Syrien (1905). J.-B. Chabot (ed.). Chronique de Michel le Syrien. Paris: Roger Pearse.
- Michael the Syrian. Chronicle. Translated by Robert Bedrosian.
- Rice, Tamara Talbot (2004). The Seljuks: Nomads and Conquerors of Asia Minor. Moscow: Tsentrpoligraf. p. 238. ISBN 5-9524-0949-0.
- Budak Yusuf (2023). "Bir Selçuklu Hâtununun Biyografisi: Selçuk Hâtun". Eurasian Academy of Sciences Social Sciences Journal (45): 56–63. doi:10.17740/eas.soc.2022.V45-04. ISSN 2149-1348.
- Cahen, Claude (1968). Pre-Ottoman Turkey: A General Survey of the Material and Spiritual Culture and History c. 1071–1330. New York: Sidgwick & Jackson. p. 492. ISBN 978-0-283-35254-6.
- Çay, M. A. (1987). II. Kılıç Arslan. Ankara: Kültür ve Turizm Bakanlığı Yayınları.
- Dündar, Seval Orhan (2021). Selçuklular Zamanında Anadolu’da Evlilik: 1075–1308. DBY Yayınları. pp. 59–62.
- Özaydin, A. (2022). "Kilicarslan II". İslâm Ansiklopedisi (in Turkish). 25: 398–402.
- Turan, O. (1971). Selçuklular Zamanında Türkiye. Istanbul: Turan Neşriyat Yurdu. pp. 112–147.
- Le Strange, Guy (1900). Baghdad During the Abbasid Caliphate: From Contemporary Arabic and Persian Sources. Clarendon Press.

Regnal titles
Preceded by Kara Arslan	Artuqid dynasty 1175–1185	Succeeded by Qutb al-Din Sukman II
