= Kilij Arslan II =

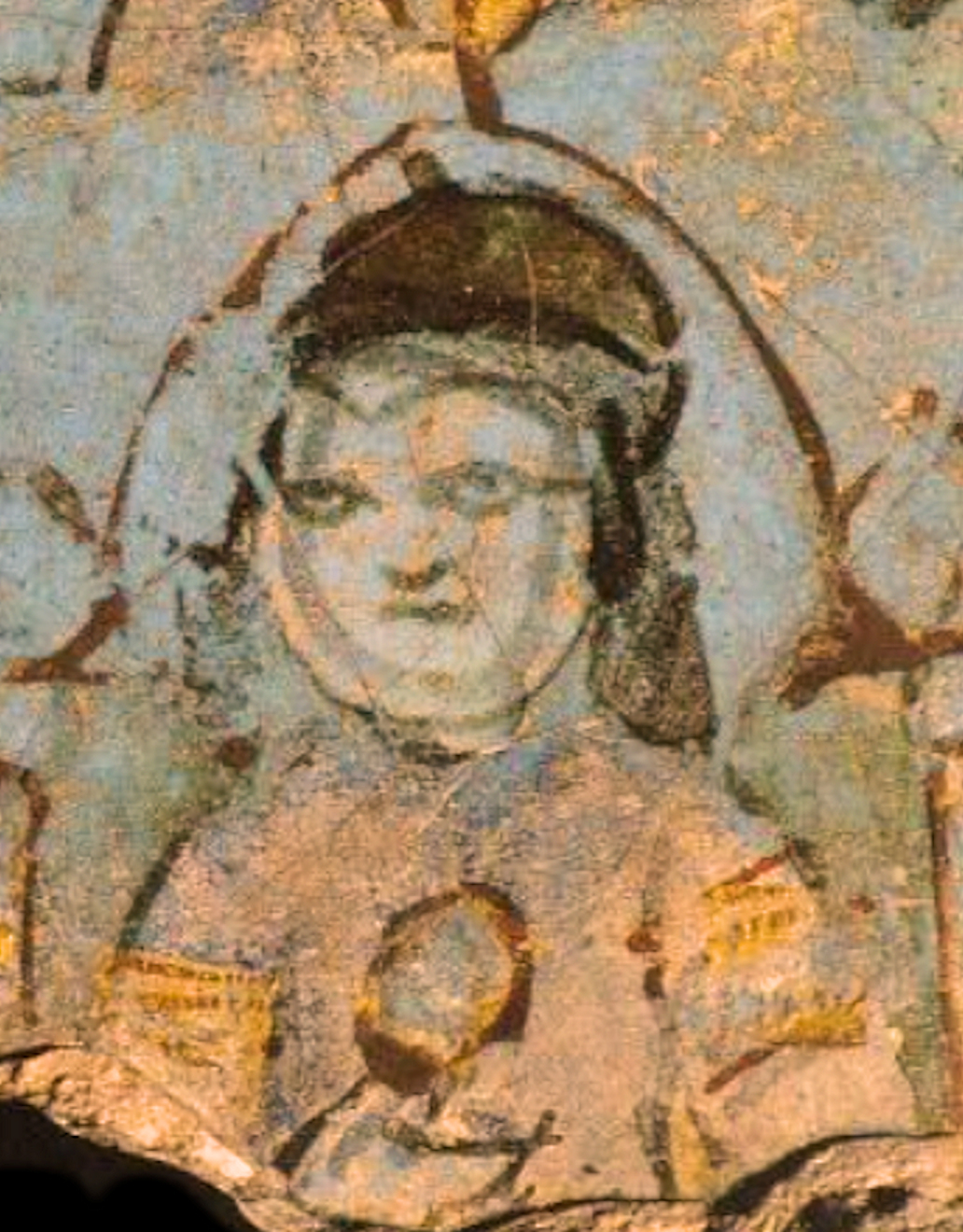
- Sultan Kilij Arslan II in a tile from Alaeddin Palace, Konya, 1156-92.

Seljuq Sultan of Rum
- Reign: 1156–1192
- Predecessor: Mesud I
- Successor: Kaykhusraw I
- Born: 1113
- Died: August 1192 (aged 78-79) near Aksaray, Turkey
- Issue: Kaykhusraw I Suleiman II; Qutub-al-Din Malikshah; Nuruddin; Tughril ibn Kilij Arslan II; Muizz; Muhyiddin Mesut; Naser; Nizam; Arslanshah; Sancarshah; Gawhar Nasiba; Seljuki; Fülane
Names
- Izz al-Dīn Qilij Arslān bin Mas'ūd
- House: Seljuk dynasty
- Father: Mesud I
- Religion: Sunni Islam

Kilij Arslan II (Turkish: II. Kılıç Arslan Persian: قِلِج اَرسلان دوم) or ʿIzz ad-Dīn Kilij Arslān ibn Masʿūd (Persian: عز الدین قلج ارسلان بن مسعود; ) was a Seljuk Sultan of Rûm from 1156 until his death in 1192.

== Early life ==
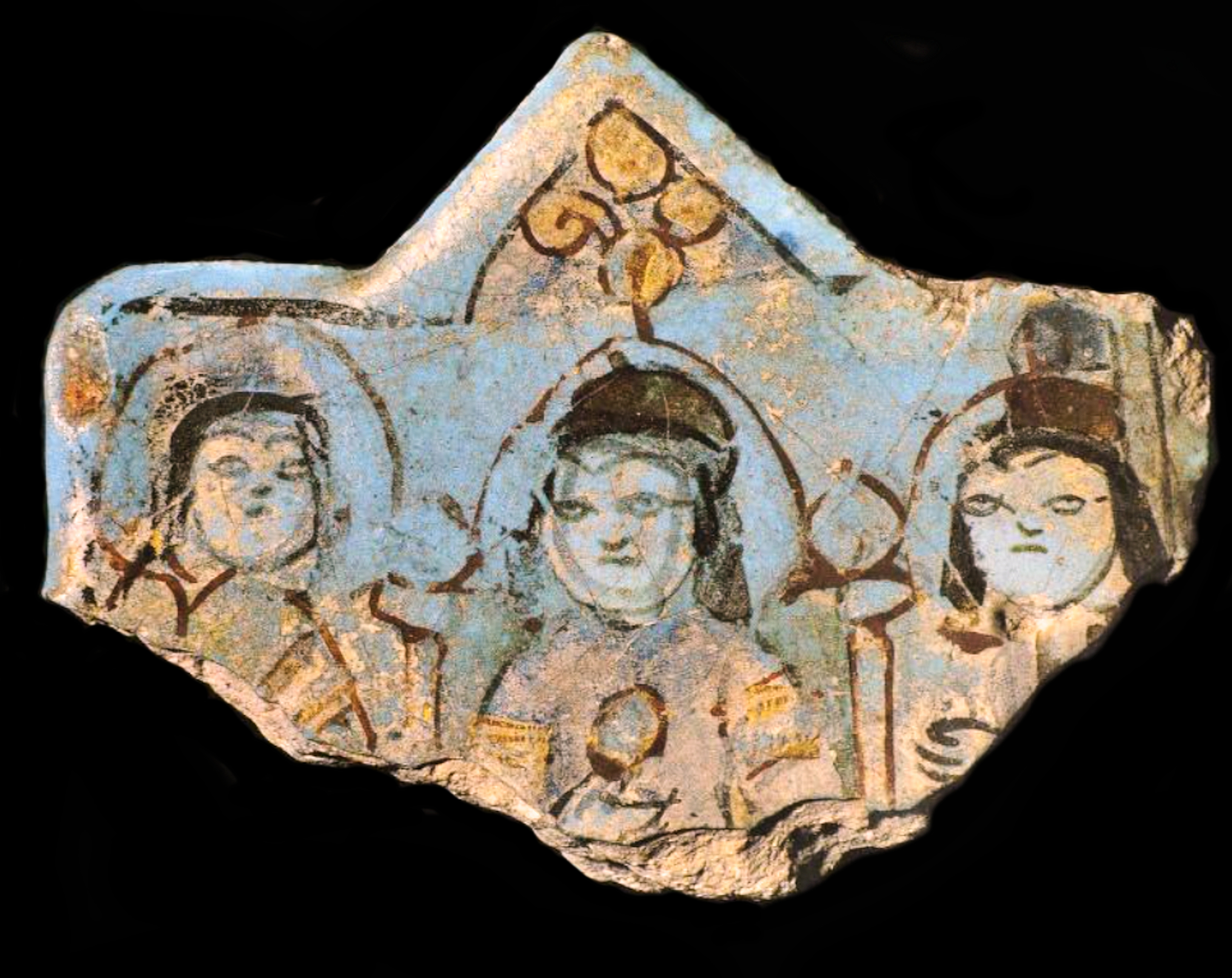
Sultan Kilij Arslan II enthroned in a tile from Alaeddin Palace, Konya, 1156-92.

Born in 1113, Kilij was the son of Mesud I, sultan of the Sultanate of Rum.

=== Appearance ===
Historical sources mention that Kilij Arslan was a hunchback and suffered from physical disabilities. According to Byzantine historian Niketas Choniates:

Kilij Arslan was not a physically well-proportioned man but maimed in several of the vital parts of his body. His hands were dislocated at the joints, and he had a slight limp and traveled mostly in a litter. This was the origin of the gibes against him, as a result of which Andronikos later contrived to call him Koutz-Arslan [Halt-Arslan].

The discovery of his skeleton and its subsequent study confirmed this. The study also revealed that he stood at 1,83 meters (6 feet) tall, but his hunchback gave an impression of a shorter height.

=== Early activity ===
In 1148 he captured the city of Marash, after the surrounding region had been devastated by the Danishmendids in 1136-1137.

== Reign ==
=== First war with Byzantium ===
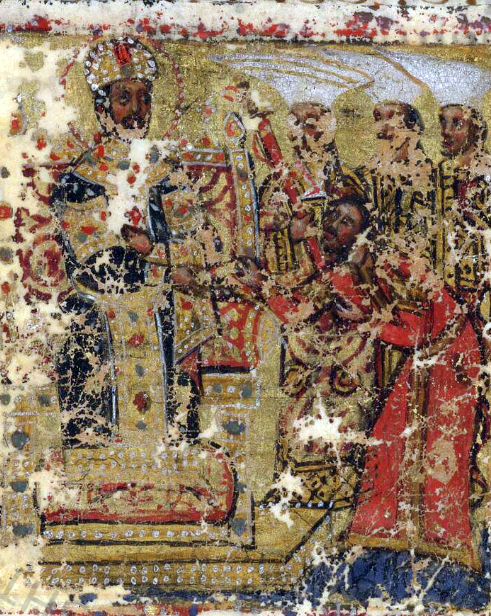
Miniature of Emperor Manuel I Komnenos c. 1179, Vatican Library

Map of Asia Minor ans the Levant c. 1140, by William Robert Shepherd

In the winter of 1158, Byzantine Emperor Manuel I Komnenos marched a large army into Cilicia and Syria, pacifying both Turkoman nomads and the Crusader states. As the imperial army was stationed at Antioch, Manuel received news of a conspiracy back in Constantinople, prompting him to abruptly depart from the city. While marching back to the capital, he requested permission from Kilij Arslan to pass through his territory. The sultan declined his request, but Manuel marched anyways, aiming to stop the conspiracy. In early 1159, the forces of the sultanate harassed the rear-guard of Manuel's army near Kotyaion, before it returned to Byzantine territory. This incident ignited the Byzantine–Seljuk War of 1158–1162. Shortly after the battle, Manuel made reprisal raids against Seljuk territories, while Turkomans began raiding Byzantine cities, including Laodikeia. In 1160, Manuel's nephew John Kontostephanos decisively defeated a large Seljuk army, and by 1161, Manuel had secured alliances with both neighbouring Muslim and Christian states, while also mobilising an imperial army to march on Iconium.

Under these conditions, Kilij Arslan was forced to travel to Constantinople in a show of submission in either late 1160 or 1161. There, Kilij swore oaths of vassalage to the Byzantines, promised to return to them all notable cities he would conquer, and was even ritually adopted as a son by Manuel. He later also promised to reconquer the city of Sebasteia for the Byzantines, after he was given gifts by the emperor.

=== Conquest of the Danishmendids ===
==== Territorial expansion and oathbreaking ====
In autumn 1164, the Danishmendid emir of Sebasteia, Yaghibasan, died. His wife married his nephew, Isma'il ibn Ibrahim, who inherited the city instead of Yaghibasan's three sons. Seeking to exploit the political instability, Kilij unsuccessfully attacked Sebasteia, with nominal Byzantine military support. Kilij failed to capture the city, but managed to subjugate most of the emirate's lands, including the regions of Albistan, Darende, Geduk, and the Tohma River in 1165. However, the sultan broke his promise to Manuel, and did not return the conquered lands back to Byzantine control. In the aftermath of the Crusader defeat at the Battle of Harim, Manuel decided not to respond the sultanate's expansion at the expense of the weakened Danishmendids, who were under Zengid protection, as to maintain the balance of power in the region.

The sultan later attacked the Danishmendids of Caesarea and Tzamandos, forcing their emir, Dhu al-Nun, to flee to the court of Nur al-Din Zengi in Damascus. He also forced his brother, Shahinshah, ruler of Ancyra and Gangra, to accept his authority. After Isma'il ibn Ibrahim and his wife were killed in a coup in 1172, Kilij quickly attacked Sebasteia for a second time. However, Nur al-Din Zengi ordered him to cease the invasion, and instead sent Dhu al-Nun to take control the city.

==== Failed coalition against Byzantium ====
In 1173, Kilij allied himself with Nur al-Din Zengi, Mleh, and Shahinshah. Together they agreed to launch a combined attack against the Byzantines. However, after learning of their coalition, Manuel quickly marched eastwards and set camp near Philadelphia. From there, he sent envoys to Kilij, accusing him of being faithless and aggressive. Kilij claimed that the Abbasid Caliph Al-Mustadi was angered by his close friendship with the Byzantines, and had pressured him to abandon his relations with Manuel. The sultan then sent the Byzantine envoys back without reaching an agreement. Manuel responded by dispatching a second embassy with a letter that warned Kilij to prepare for a Byzantine invasion that would reach Iconium in 15 days. Alarmed by the threat, Kilij abandoned the plan for a combined attack and instead sought peace with Manuel. Thereafter, the coalition broke apart, as many of those aligned with the sultan defected to Byzantium.

==== Further expansion ====
Nur al-Din's death in 1174 changed the balance of power in the Islamic world, while the Danishmendids were left vulnerable and without Zengid protection. In early 1175, Kilij occupied Sebasteia, Neokaisareia, Doceia, Comana, and other towns in Cappadocia, while he also removed his brother Shahinshah from his centre of power at Ancyra. Due to these developments, Dhu al-Nun and Shahinshah fled to Constantinople.

=== Meeting with Henry the Lion ===
As Arnold of Lübeck reports in his Chronica Slavorum, he was present at the meeting of Henry the Lion with Kilij during the former's pilgrimage to Jerusalem in 1172. When they met near Tarsus, the sultan embraced and kissed the German duke, reminding him that they were blood cousins ('amplexans et deosculans eum, dicens, eum consanguineum suum esse'). When the duke asked for details of this relationship, Kilij informed him that 'a noble lady from the land of Germans married a king of Russia who had a daughter by her; this daughter's daughter arrived to our land, and I descend from her.'

=== Second war with Byzantium ===
==== Prelude ====
As Turkoman raiders started attacking the region of the Phrygian Pentapolis, the Byzantines suspected that it was Kilij who was ordering the raids. The sultan sent his official Sulayman as an emissary to Manuel, but according to Niketas Choniates, the emissary was caught lying in front of the emperor.

Sulayman, the highest ranking official in the sultan's court, in an audience with the emperor spoke vigorously in the sultan's defense, declaring that the Turks had acted against his wishes. Offering other such specious arguments but describing conditions that were not in accordance with the facts, he was caught in the offense of lying; [...] He sent Sulayman back to the sultan to set forth those things of which he was not ignorant and to taunt him for the untrustworthiness, faithlessness, and wickedness of his ways, and to warn him that should he not desist from these actions, he would suffer the vengeance of the Romans.

Following this incident, Turkoman raiders invaded again and sacked the city of Laodikeia.

Because Kilij was indirectly attacking the Byzantines and violating the treaty, while consolidating his own power in central and eastern Anatolia, Manuel assembled an army to march against Iconium, after he had finished campaigning in Europe. After learning of Byzantine military preparations, Kilij sent envoys to the emperor and offered to follow his demands, and even promised to help the Byzantines garrison any Turkoman-controlled cities Manuel desired. The emperor then appointed Alexios Petraliphas to lead 6,000 men and enter these settlements. However, when the imperial army approached, Kilij warned the cities of the approaching Byzantines, forced them to surrender to him instead, and then refused to hand them over to Manuel, despite what had been agreed. Tensions continued to grow when the city of Amaseia, which was planning to surrender to Byzantium, was forced to surrendered to the Seljuks instead, due to the inaction of Michael Gabras.

==== Warfare ====
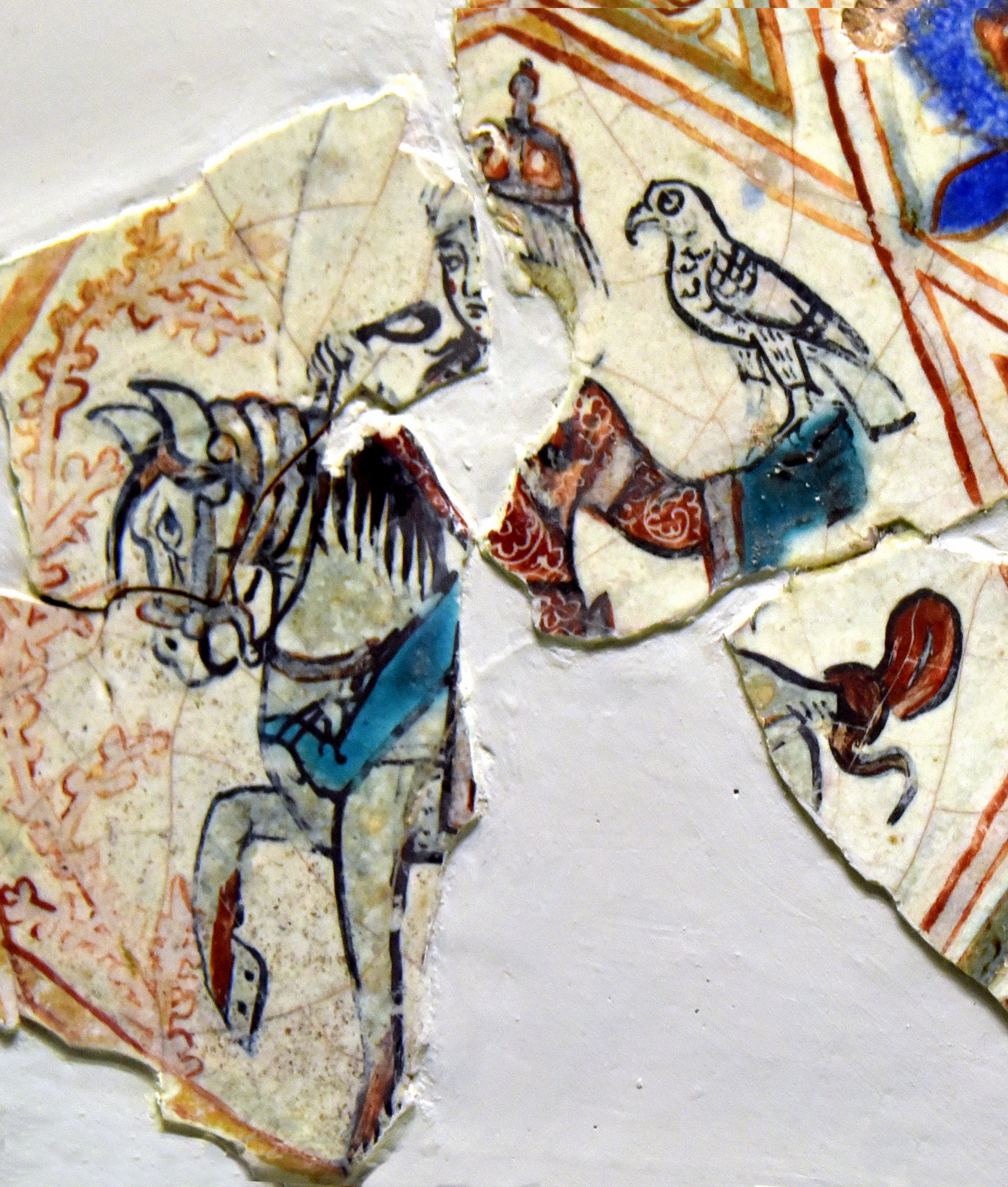
Tile depicting a royal hunt, from the Alaeddin Palace, late 12th century

Because of these incidents, raids, and violations of oaths, Manuel eventually crossed the Bosporus and raised an army, with which he defeated the Turkomans of Dorylaeum, rebuilding the fortress along with Soublaion. There, he established a base of operations from which he won engagements against Seljuk forces in the region. The emperor also sent Shahinshah to attack the Seljuks from Paphlagonia, but the force was ambushed and defeated. Kilij dispatched Ikhtiyar al-Din Hasan ibn Ghafras to Constantinople, in order to secure peace, but due to the sultan's previous breaking of promises, Manuel refused to negotiate.

In 1176, Manuel raised a large Byzantine army to march against Iconium, but Kilij ambushed his forces at the Battle of Myriokephlaon. Manuel was forced to negotiate a peace, in which he would demolish the newly built fortresses. However, the treaty was quickly broken, as Turkomans harassed the Byzantine army on its retreat and raided the Byzantine countryside, while Manuel only demolished Soublaion and left Dorylaeum intact.

After the Seljuk victory at Myriokephalon, the war became less favourable for Kilij, as the Seljuks were later defeated at Hyelion and Leimocheir, at Panasion, and at Claudiopolis. Eventually, the sultan unsuccessfully tried to gain the support of the Emperor Frederick Barbarossa, even offering to convert Rum to Christianity. Losing the war, and without external support, Kilij was forced to sign a disadvantageous treaty with Manuel in 1179, ending the conflict.

=== Diplomacy with Barbarossa ===
In 1179, Kilij captured and held to ransom Henry I, the renowned count of Champagne, who was returning overland from a visit to Jerusalem. The ransom was paid by the Byzantine Emperor and Henry was released, but died soon afterwards. The same year, Pope Alexander III wrote to Kilij, whom he had heard was interested in converting to Christianity and desired information. According to the German chronicler Otto of Sankt Blasien, writing about thirty years later, the sultan also reached out at the same time to the Emperor Frederick Barbarossa, seeking a marriage with the emperor's daughter, Beatrice. According to Otto, Kilij offered to convert to Christianity along with his subjects. Frederick agreed to the marriage, but Beatrice died before it could take place. It is probable that Kilij's overtures to pope and emperor were less about religion than about counterbalancing the Byzantines by pursuing warm relations with the west.

=== Later military activity ===
Copper fal of Kilij Arslan II on horseback c. 1156-1192

Kilij destroyed the city walls of Edessa in 1179, taking the remaining populace into captivity.

Seeking to exploit the Byzantine succession crisis that followed Manuel's death in 1180, Kilij broke the treaty in 1182 and his forces captured Sozopolis, while ravaging the surrounding villages. His army sacked Cotyaeum and put Attaleia under siege. After Isaac II Angelos usurped the throne in 1185, the sultan sent emir Same to raid Celbianum, capturing many of its inhabitants. In a letter to Michael the Syrian, the sultan claimed to have taken over 72 places from the Byzantines. At the same time, he sent Ikhtiyar al-Din Ghafras to conclude an alliance with Saladin.

=== Division of the sultanate and civil war ===
In 1186, Kilij divided the sultanate between his 11 sons and 3 daughters. In 1189, the his eldest son and ruler of Sebasteia, Qutub-al-Din Malikshah, attempted to take sole control of Rum. Kilij sent Ikhtiyar al-Din Hasan ibn Ghafras to defeat his rebellious son in Caesarea. The men who joined Malikshah dispersed once the army approached, and Malikshah himself retreated to Sebasteia. After the victory, Kilij killed 4,000 Turkomans who had joined on his son's side.

=== Third Crusade and sack of Iconium ===
Illuminated manuscript depicting the Battle of Iconium, by Master of Jouvenel, 15th century

Despite his alliance with Saladin, Kilij promised the armies of the Third Crusade, led by Frederick Barbarossa, to freely pass through his territories; however, his sons who were local chieftains disagreed and fought against the Crusaders at the Battle of Philomelion and Battle of Iconium. At Iconium, the larger Seljuk army, under Qutb al-Din, was routed. After the battle, the Seljuk capital was sacked and the equivalent of 100,000 marks was looted by the Crusaders. Barbarossa's army rested there for five days, before continuing its path torwards the city of Antioch.

Following the Crusaders' departure, Qutb al-Din came back to control Iconium; hence, Kilij escaped and took refuge in Kayseri. Later on, Qutb al-Din declared himself to be the new sultan, but his father and his brother Kaykhusraw I drove him out of the capital in 1192, then chased him to Aksaray, and besieged the city.

== Death and burial ==
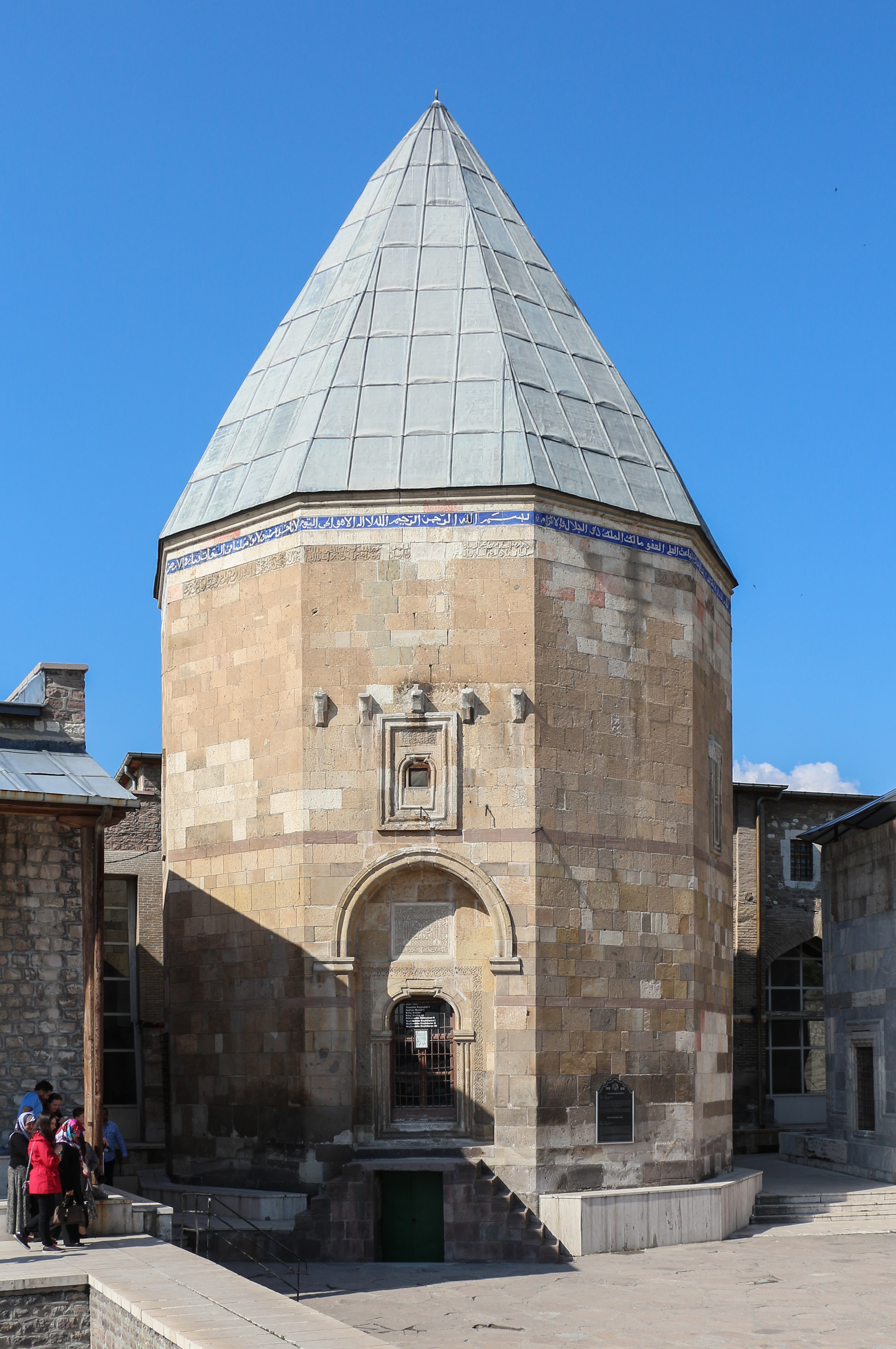
The Tomb of Kilij Arslan II in the courtyard of Alâeddin Mosque, Konya

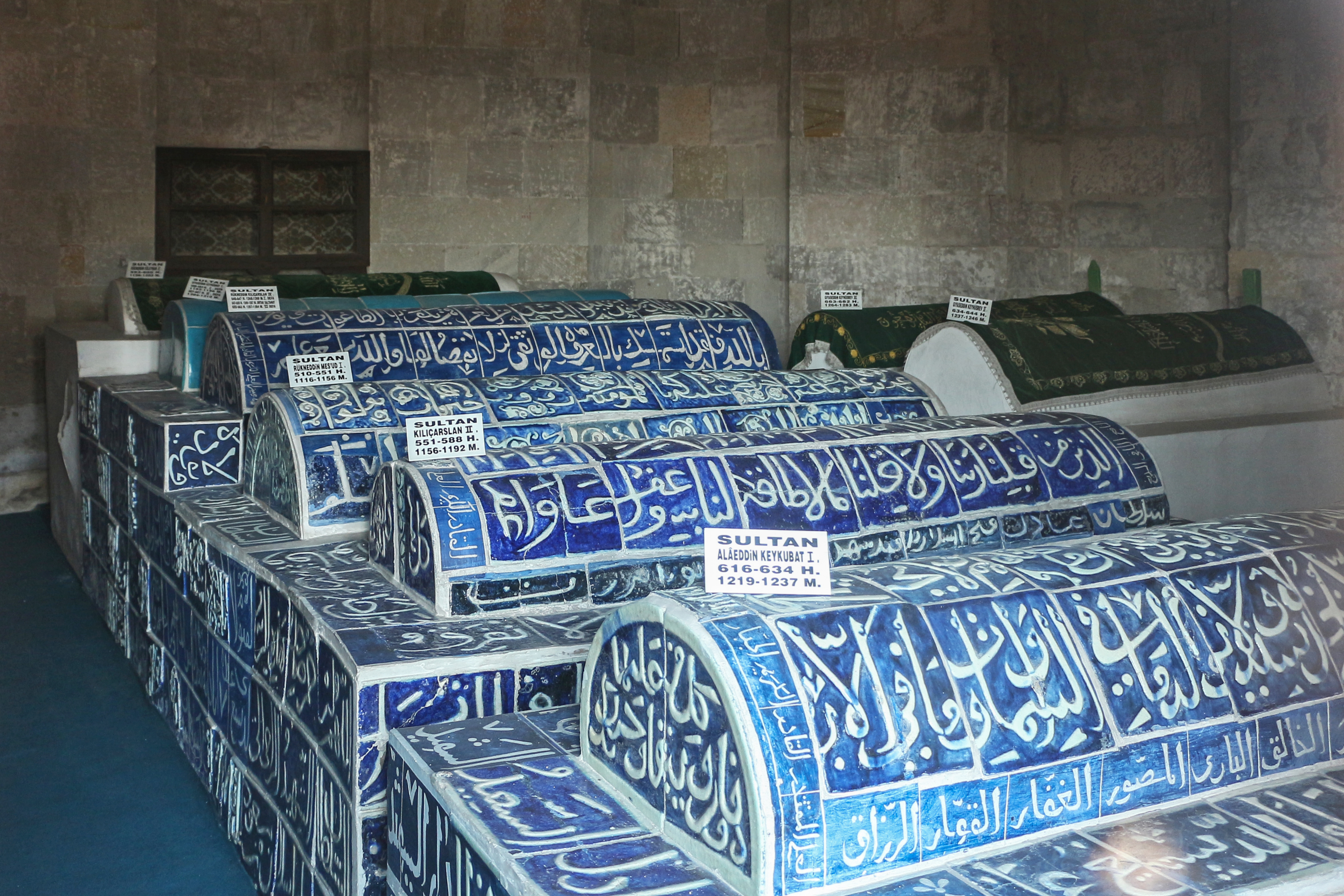
Tomb of Kilij Arslan II (second from front)

Kilij died during the siege of Aksaray in August 1192, aged 77, after promising Kaykhusraw I the succession. Then he was buried in the Alâeddin Mosque, inside the Alâeddin Kosku Palace, which he had built. Kaykhusraw I's brothers continued to fight for control of the other parts of the sultanate.

== Feud with Nur al-Din Muhammad ==
Nur al-Din Muhammad was the caliphal vassal Artuqid ruler of the Diyar Bakr, the northernmost region of Mesopotamia. He had married a daughter of Kilij Arslan II, but neglected her in favour of a singing girl. Angered, Kilij Arslan threatened Nur ad-Din, who sought the protection of Saladin in 1179.

According to contemporary accounts, only a few months after their wedding, Nur al-Din Muhammad turned away from Seljuki Khatun and treated her badly. Ibn al-Athir (1160–1233/34) wrote:

“Nur al-Din Muhammad married the daughter of Kilij Arslan. She remained with him for some time, but then he fell in love with a singer and married her. He turned away from the daughter of Kilij Arslan and left her in neglect.”

Michael the Syrian (c. 1126–1199) also stated:

“A quarrel arose between Sultan Kilij Arslan and his son-in-law Nur al-Din because the latter divorced and drove away the Sultan's daughter because of a devilish love for a certain loose woman.”

The French translation is similar, but the English translation of the text differs somewhat:

“A war arose between the Sultan and Nur al-Din, because Nur al-Din hated his wife, who was the daughter of the Sultan.”

Bar Hebraeus (1226–1286) did not provide further details, writing:

“This man was the Sultan's son-in-law, and he committed a great folly with the Sultan's daughter and involved her in a situation of adultery.”

Historians have described the woman for whom Seljuk Khatun was rejected by her husband as either a singer or a dancer.

Unaccustomed to such neglect, the princess became indignant and wrote to her father.

When Sultan Kilij Arslan II learned of his son-in-law's treatment of his daughter, he immediately sent an envoy demanding that Nur al-Din either return the dowry or leave the singer. When no response was received, Kilij Arslan attacked his son-in-law. It is possible that Kilij Arslan intended to use this as a pretext for annexing the Artuqid territories. His army invaded Muhammad's lands.

Frightened, Nur al-Din sought help from Saladin, who sent a letter to Kilij Arslan. According to Ibn al-Athir, the Sultan repeated his demands to his son-in-law: Nur al-Din was holding several castles that formed part of the dowry and was required to return them. However, Saladin had already promised support to Nur al-Din Muhammad.

No agreement was reached between Kilij Arslan II and Saladin, and Saladin marched into Seljuk territory. C. Cahen wrote that Saladin campaigned against Kilij Arslan II and occupied Turkish Seljuk lands as far as Besni, after which Kilij Arslan agreed to Saladin's request for a settlement.

The Sultan wrote to Saladin describing how Nur al-Din had insulted his daughter and stating that he “would certainly have to go to his country and put him in his place”. Saladin became angry with the messenger who delivered the message. He ordered him to tell the Sultan that he was only two days away from Malatya:

“Tell your master: I will not get off my horse until I reach there, and then I will attack his entire country and take it from him.”

The following day, the Sultan's vizier, Ikhtiyar al-Din Hasan, wrote to Saladin requesting a meeting, and Saladin granted permission. Ikhtiyar al-Din Hasan arrived and said:

“I speak on my own behalf, not on behalf of my master, and I ask you to forgive me. Such a disgraceful matter does not befit a Sultan such as you.”

Ikhtiyar al-Din Hasan reminded Saladin that people expected him to wage jihad, rather than fight a Muslim ruler. He also said:

“Imagine that Kilij Arslan had died and that his daughter had sent me to you seeking refuge.”

After hearing him, Saladin replied:

“By God, you are right! But this man, Nur al-Din, came to me. I cannot abandon him now.”

Saladin suggested that Ikhtiyar al-Din Hasan meet Nur al-Din Muhammad himself and reach an agreement with him. Saladin also promised to tell Muhammad that he was acting wrongly. At the meeting, it was agreed that Muhammad would part with the singer within a year. If he failed to do so, he would receive no assistance from Saladin. Apparently, Nur al-Din Muhammad did indeed send the woman away. Bar Hebraeus dated the conflict to 1180.

In 1183 Saladin granted him the recently conquered Amida in return for his assistance against Mosul.

=== Death of Nur al-Din Muhammad and remarriage of his daughter with the caliph al-Nasir ===
When Nur al-Din's estranged wife arrived in Baghdad from Mecca after Hajj, news came that her husband, Nur al-Din Muhammad, had died in 1185. The caliph al-Nasir proposed Seljuk Khatun for marriage. She was uncertain about marrying the Caliph, but al-Nasir ordered her to be brought to the palace and married her. Thus his widow became wife of his overlord, the caliph al-Nasir. Al-Nasir sent an honourable escort for her. She arrived in Baghdad, where the marriage was concluded, and the Caliph presented her with jewels “worthy of caliphs and rulers”.

== Children ==
In 1186, Kilij decided to divide the Sultanate among his 11 sons and 3 daughters as follows:

1. Qutb al-Din (Sivas, Aksaray)
2. Rukn al-Din (Tokat and its surroundings)
3. Nur al-Din (Kayseri and its surroundings)
4. Muqsed al-Din (Elbistan)
5. Muizz al-Din Caesar Shah (Malatya)
6. Muhyiddin Mesut (Ankara, Çankırı, Kastamonu and Eskişehir)
7. Kaykhusraw I (Uluborlu, Kutahya)
8. Naser al-Din (Niksar, Koyulhisar)
9. Nizam al-Din (Amasya)
10. Arslanshah (Niğde)
11. Sancarshah (Ereğli and its south)
12. Fülane Khatun
13. Gawhar Nasiba Khatun
14. Seljuki Khatun

== Bibliography ==
=== Primary sources ===
- Choniates, Niketas (1984). Historia. English translation: Magoulias, Harry J. (O City of Byzantium: Annals of Niketas Choniates). Detroit. ISBN 0-8143-1764-2.
- Bar Hebraeus (1932). Chronography. Translated by E. A. Wallis Budge. Gorgias Press.
- Ibn al-Athīr, ʻIzz al-Dīn (1965). الكامل في التاريخ. Vol. 9, 10. Dar Ṣáder.
- ابن جبير (Ibn Jubayr). رحلة ابن جبير (The Travels of Ibn Jubayr). بيروت (Beirut).
- Kinnamos, John (1976). Deeds of John and Manuel Comnenus. Translated by Brand, Charles M. New York: Columbia University Press. ISBN 0-231-04080-6.
- Michael the Syrian. Chronicle. Translated by Robert Bedrosian.
- Moosa, Matti (2014). The Syriac Chronicle of Michael Rabo (The Great): A Universal History from the Creation, Book Twelve. Archdiocese of the Syriac Orthodox Church for the Eastern United States. ISBN 978-1-939682-09-3.
- Michel le Syrien (1905). J.-B. Chabot (ed.). Chronique de Michel le Syrien. Paris: Roger Pearse.
- Michael the Syrian (1987). Huseynov, R. A. (ed.). "From the "Chronicle" of Michael the Syrian (Part 5)" (PDF). Written Monuments of the East: Historical and Philological Studies (Annual 1978–1979). Moscow: Nauka, GRVL: 45–56.

=== Secondary sources ===
- Adalian, Rouben Paul (2010). Historical Dictionary of Armenia. Scarecrow Press, Inc.
- Angold, Michael (2008). Shepard, Jonathan (ed.). The Cambridge History of the Byzantine Empire, c. 500–1492. Cambridge University Press.
- Assmann, Erwin (1977). "Friedrich Barbarossas Kinder". Deutsches Archiv für Erforschung des Mittelalters. 33: 435–472.
- Bryer, Anthony M. (1970). "A Byzantine Family: The Gabrades, c. 979 – c. 1653". University of Birmingham Historical Journal. XII. Birmingham: 164–187. ISSN 0261-2984.
- Budak, Yusuf (2023). "Bir Selçuklu Hâtununun Biyografisi: Selçuk Hâtun". Eurasian Academy of Sciences Social Sciences Journal (45): 56–63. doi:10.17740/eas.soc.2022.V45-04. ISSN 2149-1348.
- Cahen, Claude (1969). "The Turks in Iran and Anatolia before the Mongol Invasions". In Wolff, Robert Lee; Hazard, Harry W. (eds.). A History of the Crusades. Vol. 2. The University of Wisconsin Press.
- Cahen, Claude (1968). Pre-Ottoman Turkey: A General Survey of the Material and Spiritual Culture and History c. 1071–1330. New York: Sidgwick & Jackson. p. 492. ISBN 978-0-283-35254-6.
- Çay, M. A. (1987). II. Kılıç Arslan. Ankara: Kültür ve Turizm Bakanlığı Yayınları.
- Dündar, Seval Orhan (2021). Selçuklular Zamanında Anadolu’da Evlilik: 1075–1308. DBY Yayınları. pp. 59–62.
- Hamilton, Bernard (2000). The Leper King and His Heirs: Baldwin IV and the Crusader Kingdom of Jerusalem. Cambridge University Press.
- Ibn al-Sāʿī (2017). Consorts of the Caliphs: Women and the Court of Baghdad. Translated by Shawkat M. Toorawa and the Editors of the Library of Arabic Literature. Introduction by Julia Bray. Foreword by Marina Warner. New York: New York University Press. ISBN 978-1-4798-0477-1.
- Kaldellis, Anthony (2023). The New Roman Empire: A History of Byzantium. New York: Oxford University Press. ISBN 978-0197549322.
- Loud, G. A. (2010). The Crusade of Frederick Barbarossa: The History of the Expedition of the Emperor Frederick and Related Texts. Ashgate Publishing. ISBN 9780754665755.
- Lyons, M. C.; Jackson, D. E. P. (1982). Saladin: the Politics of the Holy War. Cambridge University Press. ISBN 978-0-521-31739-9.
- Magdalino, Paul (2011). "Court and Capital in Byzantium". In Duindam, Jeroen; Artan, Tülay; Kunt, Metin (eds.). Royal Courts in Dynastic States and Empires: A Global Perspective. Vol. 1. Brill.
- Magdalino, Paul (1993). The Empire of Manuel I Komnenos, 1143–1180. New York: Cambridge University Press. ISBN 0-521-30571-3.
- McMahon, Lucas (2025). "Manuel I Komnenos' policy towards the Sultanate of Rum and John Kontostephanos' embassies to Jerusalem, 1159–61". Crusades. 24 (1): 47–66. doi:10.1080/14765276.2024.2405810.
- Mecit, Songül (2014). The Rum Seljuqs: evolution of a dynasty. Routledge studies in the history of Iran and Turkey. London ; New York: Routledge, Taylor & Francis Group. p. 106. ISBN 978-0-415-50540-6.
- Mercan, F. Özden (2017). "Constructing a Self-Image in the Image of the Other: Pope Pius II's Letter to Sultan Mehmed II". In Marianna D. Birnbaum; Marcell Sebők (eds.). Practices of Coexistence: Constructions of the Other in Early Modern Perceptions. Central European University Press. pp. 71–102.
- Özaydin, A. (2022). "Kilicarslan II". İslâm Ansiklopedisi (in Turkish). 25: 398–402.
- Peacock, A.C.S.; Yildiz, Sara Nur (2015). The Seljuks of Anatolia: Court and Society in the Medieval Middle East. I.B. Tauris.
- Redford, Scott (1993). "Thirteenth-Century Rum Seljuq Palaces and Palace Imagery". Ars Orientalis. 23.
- Rice, Tamara Talbot (2004). The Seljuks: Nomads and Conquerors of Asia Minor. Moscow: Tsentrpoligraf. p. 238. ISBN 5-9524-0949-0.
- Stouraitis, Yannis, ed. (2018). Brill’s Companions to the Byzantine World. A Companion to the Byzantine Culture of War, ca. 300-1204. Vol. 3. Brill. ISBN 978-90-04-35551-4.
- Le Strange, Guy (1900). Baghdad During the Abbasid Caliphate: From Contemporary Arabic and Persian Sources. Clarendon Press.
- Treadgold, Warren (1997). A History of the Byzantine State and Society. Stanford University Press. ISBN 978-0-8047-2630-6.
- Turan, O. (1971). Selçuklular Zamanında Türkiye. Istanbul: Turan Neşriyat Yurdu. pp. 112–147.
- Vryonis, Speros (1971). The Decline of Medieval Hellenism in Asia Minor and the Process of Islamisation from the Eleventh through the Fifteenth Century. California University Press. ISBN 0-520-05753-8.

Preceded by Mesud I	Sultan of Rûm; 1156–1192	Succeeded by Kaykhusraw I
