= Seljuki Khatun =

12th-century Seljuk princess and Wife of Caliph al-Nasir

Seljuki Khatun سلجوقي خاتون

Consort of the Abbasid caliph
- Tenure: 1186 – 1188
- Born: Konya, Sultanate of Rum, (now part of Turkey)
- Died: 1188 (584 AH); Baghdad, Abbasid Caliphate
- Burial: Baghdad
- Spouse: Nur al-Din (separated); Al-Nasir (until her death)
Names
- Seljuki Khatun bint Kilij Arslan
Era name and dates
- Later Abbasid era: 12th century
- Dynasty: Rumi Seljuk
- Father: Kilij Arslan II
- Religion: Sunni Islam

Seljuki Khatun (Arabic: سلجوقي خاتون) or Saljuqi Khatun was a Seljuk Turkish princess of Rum, daughter of sultan Kilij Arslan II and wife of Abbasid caliph al-Nasir.

== Early life ==
Seljuki Khatun was a daughter of sultan of Rum, Kilij Arslan II. She had eleven brothers, including future sultan Kaykhusraw I, and two older sisters. She spent her childhood at her father's court in Konya.

Sources give different names for Seljuki: Ibn Jubayr referred to her as “Malika Khatun” and “Seljuk Khatun”; Ibn al-Athir called her “Seljuk Khatun”; Bar Hebraeus called her “Khalataita”; and the Baghdad scholar and historian Ibn al-Sa'i (1197–1276) referred to her as “al-Akhlatiyya”.

=== First marriage and Marital separation ===
Seljuk Khatun was the daughter of the Seljuk Sultan of Rum, Kilij Arslan II. Nothing is known about her life before her first marriage. Her first husband was the Artuqid ruler of Hasan Kayfa, Nur al-Din Muhammad ibn Kara Arslan, who ruled from 1167 to 1185. The date of their marriage is unknown. As her dowry, she received several Seljuk castles near the borders of the Artuqid territories in the Hanzit region, whose centre was Kharpert.

Soon after the marriage, relations between her father and husband deteriorated when Kilij Arslan captured Malatya on 25 October 1178, a city bordering the Artuqid territories. Nur al-Din Muhammad appealed to Saladin, the ruler of Syria, and received a promise of support in exchange for his submission.

According to contemporary accounts, only a few months after their wedding, Nur al-Din Muhammad turned away from Seljuk Khatun and treated her badly. Ibn al-Athir (1160–1233/34) wrote:

“Nur al-Din Muhammad married the daughter of Kilij Arslan. She remained with him for some time, but then he fell in love with a singer and married her. He turned away from the daughter of Kilij Arslan and left her in neglect.”

Michael the Syrian (c. 1126–1199) also stated:

“A quarrel arose between Sultan Kilij Arslan and his son-in-law Nur al-Din because the latter divorced and drove away the Sultan's daughter because of a devilish love for a certain loose woman.”

The French translation is similar, but the English translation of the text differs somewhat:

“A war arose between the Sultan and Nur al-Din, because Nur al-Din hated his wife, who was the daughter of the Sultan.”

Bar Hebraeus (1226–1286) did not provide further details, writing:

“This man was the Sultan's son-in-law, and he committed a great folly with the Sultan's daughter and involved her in a situation of adultery.”

Historians have described the woman for whom Seljuk Khatun was rejected by her husband as either a singer or a dancer.

Unaccustomed to such neglect, the princess became indignant and wrote to her father.

When Sultan Kilij Arslan II learned of his son-in-law's treatment of his daughter, he immediately sent an envoy demanding that Nur al-Din either return the dowry or leave the singer. When no response was received, Kilij Arslan attacked his son-in-law. It is possible that Kilij Arslan intended to use this as a pretext for annexing the Artuqid territories. His army invaded Muhammad's lands.

Frightened, Nur al-Din sought help from Saladin, who sent a letter to Kilij Arslan. According to Ibn al-Athir, the Sultan repeated his demands to his son-in-law: Nur al-Din was holding several castles that formed part of the dowry and was required to return them. However, Saladin had already promised support to Nur al-Din Muhammad.

No agreement was reached between Kilij Arslan II and Saladin, and Saladin marched into Seljuk territory. C. Cahen wrote that Saladin campaigned against Kilij Arslan II and occupied Turkish Seljuk lands as far as Besni, after which Kilij Arslan agreed to Saladin's request for a settlement.

The Sultan wrote to Saladin describing how Nur al-Din had insulted his daughter and stating that he “would certainly have to go to his country and put him in his place”. Saladin became angry with the messenger who delivered the message. He ordered him to tell the Sultan that he was only two days away from Malatya:

“Tell your master: I will not get off my horse until I reach there, and then I will attack his entire country and take it from him.”

The following day, the Sultan's vizier, Ikhtiyar al-Din Hasan, wrote to Saladin requesting a meeting, and Saladin granted permission. Ikhtiyar al-Din Hasan arrived and said:

“I speak on my own behalf, not on behalf of my master, and I ask you to forgive me. Such a disgraceful matter does not befit a Sultan such as you.”

Ikhtiyar al-Din Hasan reminded Saladin that people expected him to wage jihad, rather than fight a Muslim ruler. He also said:

“Imagine that Kilij Arslan had died and that his daughter had sent me to you seeking refuge.”

After hearing him, Saladin replied:

“By God, you are right! But this man, Nur al-Din, came to me. I cannot abandon him now.”

Saladin suggested that Ikhtiyar al-Din Hasan meet Nur al-Din Muhammad himself and reach an agreement with him. Saladin also promised to tell Muhammad that he was acting wrongly. At the meeting, it was agreed that Muhammad would part with the singer within a year. If he failed to do so, he would receive no assistance from Saladin. Apparently, Nur al-Din Muhammad did indeed send the woman away.

Bar Hebraeus dated the conflict to 1180.

== Marriage with al-Nasir ==
Some time after reconciling with her husband, Seljuk Khatun set out on the Hajj, distressed that she had become the cause of the conflict. During her journey, she stopped in Baghdad with her entourage. According to Ibn al-Sa'i, she passed through the city in 579 AH (1183/84).

The caliph al-Nasir li-Din Allah was informed of her beauty and decided to marry her. Seljuk Khatun refused, explaining that she was already married. She then left Baghdad and continued to Mecca.

Ibn Jubayr travelled to Mecca in the same caravan as Seljuk Khatun. According to him, she “surpassed others in nobility”. Around one hundred camels carried her personal belongings, water, and provisions. She also equipped sixty camels to carry water and food for distribution among the pilgrims. Ibn Jubayr estimated that she was about twenty-five years old.

He described the Khatun's temporary disappearance without understanding what had happened, and confused Kilij Arslan with his father.

“We departed for Batn Marr, We remained there on Friday as well, for a remarkable reason. Malika Khatun, the daughter of Emir Masud, ruler of al-Darab (the Ravines), Armenia, and the lands bordering the country of al-Rum, left Batn Marr on the night before Friday for Mecca with an entourage of servants and eunuchs. On that Friday, she was nowhere to be found. The Emir sent trustworthy men from among his closest companions to investigate her whereabouts, while he and the other pilgrims waited for her. She appeared only at the beginning of Saturday night. The absence of this delicate lady gave rise to much speculation and a desire to uncover her secret.”

An explanation for the princess's disappearance and reappearance is given by Bar Hebraeus:

“The Caliph sent a detachment of horsemen into her entourage, as though they too intended to perform the pilgrimage [to Mecca]. When the Khatun wished to take another road, they prevented her from doing so and forcibly brought her back.”

This suggests that, on her return journey, she attempted to change her route and travel back through Syria, fearing the Caliph. Al-Nasir anticipated this and, on his orders, his men accompanied her and prevented her from escaping.

When she arrived in Baghdad from Mecca, news came that her husband, Nur al-Din Muhammad, had died in 1185. The obstacle to her marriage to the Caliph had therefore disappeared, and Seljuk Khatun had no further excuse. She did not want to marry the Caliph, but al-Nasir ordered her to be brought to the palace and married her.

Ibn al-Sa'i provided a somewhat different account. According to him, Seljuk Khatun returned home after the Hajj in 580 AH (1184/85). Only a year and a half later did the Caliph propose marriage to her, and they became engaged. Al-Nasir sent an honourable escort for her. She arrived in Baghdad, where the marriage was concluded, and the Caliph presented her with jewels “worthy of caliphs and rulers”.

The Caliph loved her deeply. She wished for a palace like the one in Akhlat, and he instructed his vizier to build one. The palace was constructed by two hundred architects and two thousand workers. Doors from old palaces and trees from the gardens of old palaces were brought there.

According to Professor Y. Budak of Gazi University, the marriage was particularly significant because it was concluded without any political motives.

== Death and funeral ==
Soon after the palace was completed, Seljuk Khatun died. The Caliph was deeply saddened by her death and mourned his wife for three days.

According to Ibn al-Sa'i, the Caliph “could neither eat nor drink for several days”. According to Ibn al-Jawzi, “condolences were received for three days; the vizier, nobles, military commanders, and scholars were present”.

Ibn al-Sa'i, Ibn al-Athir, and Ibn al-Jawzi dated her death to 2 Rabi' al-Akhir 584 AH (6 June 1188).

During her lifetime, she began building a mausoleum for herself near the landing place in Karkh, beside the shrine of Awn and Mu'in, descendants of Ali. The site is now known as the Mausoleum of Zubayda and is located near the Basra Gate, but she did not live to see the mausoleum completed.

She was buried there, and the caliph later completed her mausoleum. Nearby, he built the famous ribat known as “al-Ramla”, where a library was established. Al-Nasir donated numerous income-producing properties to support the ribat and her mausoleum. Alms were distributed annually to pilgrims in her name.

According to Ibn al-Sa'i, “for many years, her house remained exactly as it had been, with all its draperies and furniture; it was never opened, and nothing was taken from it”. Later, the Caliph ordered the palace built for her to be demolished and its garden destroyed.

== Sources ==
- El-Hibri, Tayeb (2021). The Abbasid Caliphate: A History. Cambridge and New York: Cambridge University Press. ISBN 978-1-107-18324-7.
- Ibn al-Sāʿī (2017). Consorts of the Caliphs: Women and the Court of Baghdad. Translated by Shawkat M. Toorawa and the Editors of the Library of Arabic Literature. Introduction by Julia Bray. Foreword by Marina Warner. New York: New York University Press. ISBN 978-1-4798-0477-1.
- Peacock, A.C.S.; Yildiz, Sara Nur (2015). The Seljuks of Anatolia: Court and Society in the Medieval Middle East. I.B. Tauris.
- Ibn Jubayr (1984). Travels. Translated by L. A. Semenova. Nauka.
- Michael the Syrian; R. A. Huseynov (1987). "From the "Chronicle" of Michael the Syrian (Part 5)" (PDF). Written Monuments of the East: Historical and Philological Studies (Annual 1978–1979). Moscow: Nauka, GRVL: 45–56.
- ابن جبير (Ibn Jubayr). رحلة ابن جبير (The Travels of Ibn Jubayr). بيروت (Beirut).
- ʻIzz al-Dīn Ibn al-Athīr (1965). الكامل في التاريخ. Vol. 9, 10. Dar Ṣáder.
- Bar Hebraeus (1932). Chronography. Translated by E. A. Wallis Budge. Gorgias Press.
- Ibn al-Sāʿī|Ibn al-Sāʿī|Consorts of the Caliphs: Women and the Court of Baghdad|Shawkat M. Toorawa|editor2=the Editors of the Library of Arabic Literature|2017|chapter=29. Saljūqī Khātūn
- Michel le Syrien (1905). J.-B. Chabot (ed.). Chronique de Michel le Syrien. Paris: Roger Pearse.
- Michael the Syrian. Chronicle. Translated by Robert Bedrosian.
- Rice, Tamara Talbot (2004). The Seljuks: Nomads and Conquerors of Asia Minor. Moscow: Tsentrpoligraf. p. 238. ISBN 5-9524-0949-0.
- Budak Yusuf (2023). "Bir Selçuklu Hâtununun Biyografisi: Selçuk Hâtun". Eurasian Academy of Sciences Social Sciences Journal (45): 56–63. doi:10.17740/eas.soc.2022.V45-04. ISSN 2149-1348.
- Cahen, Claude (1968). Pre-Ottoman Turkey: A General Survey of the Material and Spiritual Culture and History c. 1071–1330. New York: Sidgwick & Jackson. p. 492. ISBN 978-0-283-35254-6.
- Çay, M. A. (1987). II. Kılıç Arslan. Ankara: Kültür ve Turizm Bakanlığı Yayınları.
- Dündar, Seval Orhan (2021). Selçuklular Zamanında Anadolu’da Evlilik: 1075–1308. DBY Yayınları. pp. 59–62.
- Özaydin, A. (2022). "Kilicarslan II". İslâm Ansiklopedisi (in Turkish). 25: 398–402.
- Le Strange, Guy (1900). Baghdad During the Abbasid Caliphate: From Contemporary Arabic and Persian Sources. Clarendon Press.
- Turan, O. (1971). Selçuklular Zamanında Türkiye. Istanbul: Turan Neşriyat Yurdu. pp. 112–147.
