= Cleveland table fountain =

14th-century French piece of metalwork

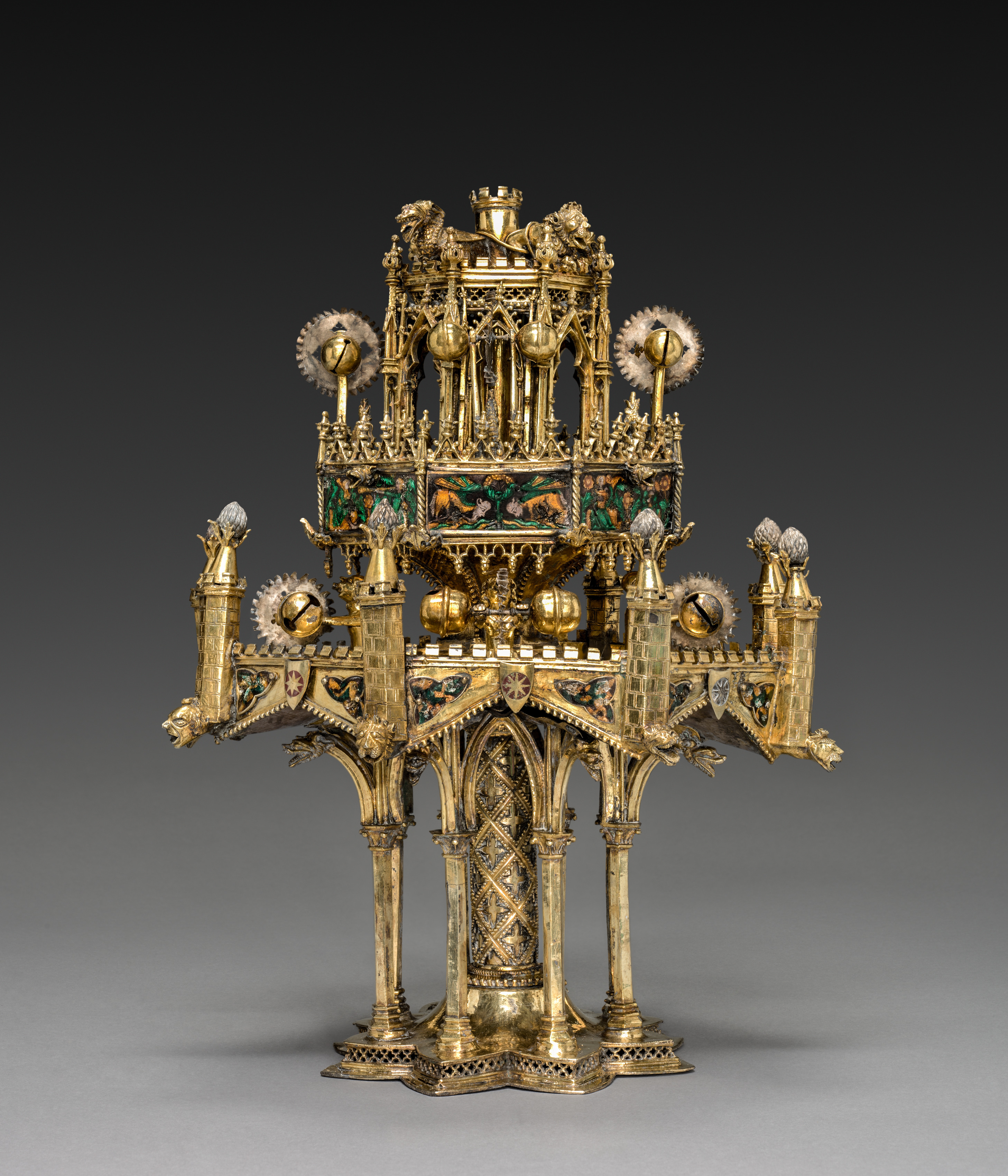
- Table Fountain, c. 1320–40. France, Paris. The Cleveland Museum of Art, Gift of J. H. Wade 1924.859.
- Year: c. 1320–1340; 686 years ago
- Medium: Gilt-silver and translucent enamels
- Dimensions: 33.8 cm × 25.4 cm × 26 cm (13 5/16 in × 10 in × 10.25 in)
- Location: Cleveland Museum of Art

The Cleveland table fountain is the only surviving complete European Medieval tabletop water feature, currently held by the Cleveland Museum of Art. Built between 1320 and 1340 CE in Paris, the three-tiered table fountain depicts a miniature Gothic building adorned with battlements, bells, pinnacles, vaults, columns, and plaques depicting grotesque figures playing musical instruments. It is built with gilt-silver and translucent enamel. Although previously thought to be placed atop banquet tables, table fountains were typically placed on pedestals in conspicuous locations in palaces. The nozzles would shoot water (sometimes scented) onto the bells to ring. Although Medieval inventories reveal that these fountains once existed in large quantities, the Cleveland table fountain is the only one of its time in complete form to survive, making it a very rare but textbook display. The military siege craft and Gothic architecture make this fountain a product of its time.

== Description ==
The metal of the three tiers are cut and bent sheet metal or individually made, which was then affixed to a series of translucent plaques depicting drolleries (hybrid human and animal figures). Since the fountain functions via hydraulics, a central hollow tube pumps water to the top where it emerges through a crenelated turret and animal and drollery-shaped nozzles. Water cascades down from one level to another through gargoyle drains, where it falls into an affixed catch basin.

The architectural features of the table fountain evoke rayonnant style corresponding to the period from 1240 to 1350. The large, center pillar contains the conduit for water and is adorned with diapered decoration. Eight pointed lobes create an eight-pointed star that forms the foot of the fountain. It supports eight hexagonal columns, which is surmounted with a foliated capital. On top of the capital, an arch and two shafts rests. A serpent-head terminus at the end of the shaft was a common display in French architecture from this period. The open arcade structurally mimics the lower chapel of the Sainte-Chapelle.

Animated representation of a Parisian table fountain made of gilt-silver and translucent enamel.

=== Upper levels and roof ===
The second terrace sits on an everted flaring stem rising from the center of the bottom terrace. Eight rectangular basse-taille (the most luxurious enameling technique of the time) enamel plaques adorn it. The depressions within the plaques indicate that at some point prior to Cleveland's acquisition they were removed and re-enameled. The upper and lower terrace wall edges resemble twelfth and thirteenth-century French churches. This terrace holds four cast winged dragons supporting feathered water wheels on axles with gilt-silver bells. These dragons have tubes in their mouths in order to deliver water unto the wheels and ring the bells. There are four drains that take up the appearance of gargoyle-like dragons on the eight-sided terrace. These dragon heads drain water to the bottom terrace.

The second terrace's plaques depict eight different chromatic creatures:

1. Two animals playing a tambourine and a violin (a donkey and a rat)
2. Two women playing a violin and a lute
3. Two back-to-back drolleries, one with wings
4. Pair of angels playing instruments
5. Pair of back-to-back bipedal drolleries with wings and green robes
6. Male and female musicians playing a zither and flute
7. Two birds
8. Male and female musicians playing a tambourine and lute

The form of the upper level resembles lantern towers in thirteenth-century cathedrals in France and England, thanks to its octagonal tower of cusped arches with crockets and openwork tracery surmounted by crenellations. For instance the Cathedral of Notre-Dame in Coutances, France features an octagonal lantern tower. A water conduit would emerge through the roof taking form as a smaller battlemented tower. From this tower, a stream of water would have percolated down through holes in the roof. Though unconfirmed, it is possible that a "small cup or vase in rock crystal" would've been installed into the top of the small tower.

=== Bottom terrace ===
The octagonal terrace with crenellations has small hexagonal towers in simulated masonry topped by castle turret and pine cone. This terrace's resemblance to a castle wall makes it a piece of siege craft architecture. The stars on the shields (which may have been added onto after creation) adorning the terrace are associated with the Order of the Star, who it may have been presented to.

=== Underneath and pedestal shaft ===
The underside reveals that a larger basin (likely also gilt-silver) at the bottom, now lost, was threaded to the fountain. This basin could have included coat of arms, inscriptions, insignias, or other identifying symbols. In order for an egress for waste water, a second conduit in the basin or pipe in the pedestal shaft was necessary. This was then to empty into an underground drain pipe. In order for this to be employed, semipermanent and impractical modifications must be made for a piece of furniture. Thus, it is likely that a custom-made pedestal was used for the basin.

The eight-lobed foot of the fountain has a band of pierced openwork quatrefoils along the edge, a decorative motif frequently mentioned in fourteenth-century inventories. This style of goldsmithing is most often associated with Parisian goldsmithing techniques from 1280-1330.

== Context ==
French medieval inventories reveal that automata once existed in substantial numbers. Scholarship and fondness of automaton in Europe takes root largely from Ismail Al-Jazari's The Book of Knowledge of Ingenious Mechanical Devices presented to Sultan Mahmūd in 1206. The treatise was translated locally and quickly ends up in western European sketchbooks by 1220. The appreciation for ostentation in European royal courts, especially Burgundian, French, and Flemish, made automata an ideal aspect of court culture.

The numeral 8 played a major role in the design of the table fountain. At the foot is an eight-lobed pointed star, its lower and upper terraces are octagonal, same is said for the lantern tower, and the lower terrace is supported by eight colonnettes. Further, the fountain possesses eight cast drolleries. During the Middle Ages, the number 8 had liturgical symbolism. It represented perfection and infinity and resurrection and rebirth (since Christ rose from the dead eight days after entering Jerusalem. Though the fountain is secular, it possibly mirrors the symbolism of rebirth and infinity, likely intended to recall the Fountain of Youth.

The artistic repertoire most resembles Parisian illuminator Jean Pucelle's craft. Many of his innovations include drolleries and playful grotesque half-human half-animal creatures within the decals of his manuscripts. The table fountain's creator is presumed to have been exposed to Pucelle's grotesques in Paris.^{[2]}

== Exhibition history ==
The Cleveland table fountain is unprovenanced. It was possibly commissioned by John the Good (r. 1350-64), King Philip VI (r. 1328-50), or by King Charles IV, (r. 1322-28) whose third wife Jeanne d'Évreux was a documented owner of the fountain. John's sons (including Philip the Bold, Duke of Burgundy r. 1363-1404) all owned elaborate table fountains, making it conceivable that the fountain originated through Charles IV, Philip VI, or John the Good's commission.

The fountain's recent history, including previous ownership, how it was discovered, or where it was discovered, is largely unknown and undocumented. A tradition of unknown and unreliable origin stipulates that the fountain was found in a garden in Istanbul after World War I, where art historian William M. Milliken acquired it for the Cleveland Museum of Art in 1924, purchased from Paris-based dealer Raphael Stora. Milliken did not ask where Stora acquired the fountain.
