= Qutub-al-Din Malikshah =

Malik Shah II
- Sultan of Sivas and Aksaray
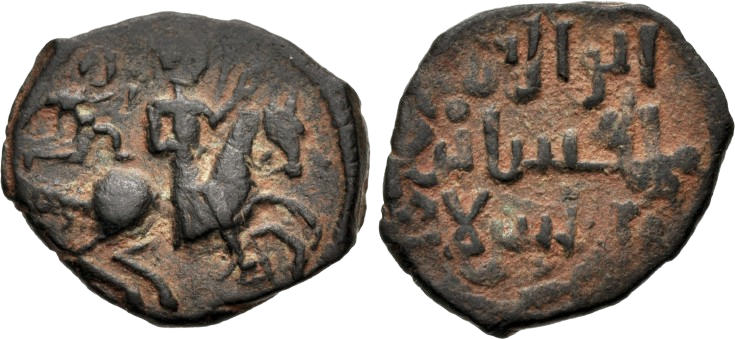
- A coin of his, on the obverse, nimbate horseman to right being crowned by Victory, on the reverse, ruler’s name and titles.

Sultan of Rum in Sivas and Aksaray
- Reign: 1186–1197
- Successor: Suleiman II

Sultan of Rum
- Reign: 1192 (a few months)
- Predecessor: Kilij Arslan II
- Successor: Kilij Arslan II
- Born: unknown
- Died: 1195/1197
- Father: Kilij Arslan II
- Religion: Islam

Qutub al-Din Malikshah also known as Malik Shah II was a son of Kilij Arslan II who became de facto sultan of Konya then self declared Sultan of Rum in 1192.

It is said that he instigated a failed rebellion against his father in 1189 in Konya, then he seized de facto power in 1190, when his father abandoned Konya.

== Context ==
After thirty years of rule, the seventy-year-old Sultan Kilij Arslan II, weary and ill, attempting to transfer the burden of power to his heirs and spend the last years of his life in peace and tranquility, officially divided the Sultanate among his nine sons, brother, and nephew (according to another version, among eleven sons), leaving behind only the title of Sultan and Konya the capital of the Sultanate. Qutb ad-Din Malikshah received the territory of Sebastia and Archelai as an appanage. Specific rulers (maliks) were obliged to recognize the sultan as their overlord and to visit him once a year with their army, but in practice they became semi-independent rulers. Within their appanages, the maliks minted coins bearing their names, their names were mentioned in the khutba (religious sermon) after the sultan's name, and their names were applied to buildings they erected. Furthermore, they could even negotiate agreements with Byzantium themselves. Coins and inscriptions of Qutb ad-Din Malikshah and four of his Malik brothers have survived to this day. The exact year of the division of the Sultanate into these districts is unknown. Turkish scholars (Salim Koca, Osman Turan, and others) agree that it occurred in 1185–1186. The Soviet Turkologist V. A. Gordlevsky believed that the division had taken place in 1188.

Malikshah did not approve of this decision by his father. Considering himself the rightful heir to the throne, he did not wait for his father's death and decided to establish his suzerainty over the future of the sultanate, sharing supreme power with his father and even replacing him in advance as head of the sultanate. To achieve this goal, Qutub-al-Din Malikshah first decided to establish control of the capital and all of Kilij Arslan's territory.

In the first half of 1189, at the head of Turkmen detachments, he established himself in Konya, but was defeated by Kilij Arslan's troops under the command of the vizier Ikhtiyar al-Din Hasan ibn Ghafras, of the Byzantine Gabras family. Malikshah's actions, however, caused discord between the sultan and his vizier. According to Michael the Syrian, Hasan was inciting Kılıj Arslan against Malikshah. In September of that year, Hasan resigned and went to rest in the possession of Mangujakid Fakhr ad-Din Bahram Shah, but was killed by the Turkmens en route. During the winter of 1189/90, Malikshah, at the head of his Turkmen forces, nevertheless captured Konya and forced his father to share supreme power over the sultanate with him. Malikshah then declared himself Sultan in 1192 and marched on Kayseri only to be defeated by his father at Konya and deposed, Kilij Arslan seems to have spared him since he kept ruling his designed cities till his death.

After this, not much is heard about him, he kept his position as sultan in Sivas and Aksaray and died in 1197 of unknown causes.

== Bibliography ==
- Claude Cahen. Turkey before the Ottoman sultans. The Seljuk Empire, the Turkic state and the rule of the Mongols. 1071–1330. ISBN 978-5-9524-5526-9.
- Turan O. Selçuklular zamanında Türkiye tarihi: siyâsi tarih Alp Arslan'dan Osman Gazi'ye (1071–1318). — Nakışlar yayınevi, 1984. 752 p.
- Özaydın A. Kılıcarslan II (Turkish) // TDV İslâm Ansiklopedisi. — Ankara, 2002. — C. 25. — S. 399–403.
