= Rukn al-Din Mawdud =

Artuqid vassal ruler of Hasankeyf (1222 – 1232/33)

- Emir of Hasankeyf
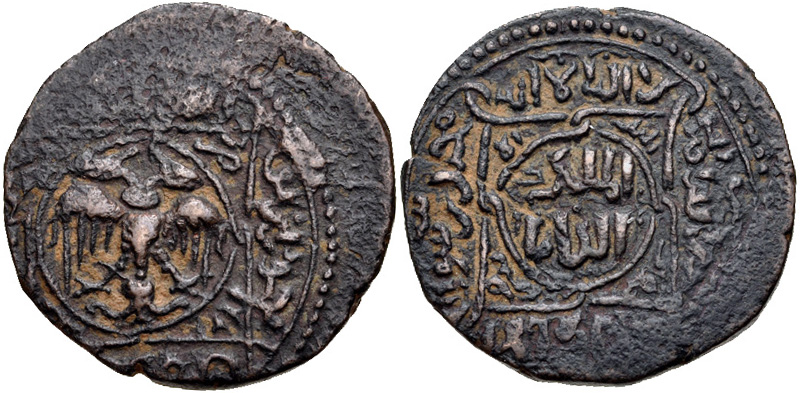
- Coin of Rukn al-Din Mawdud, with Ayyubid overlords al-Kamil, and al-Ashraf Musa (local), and citing the Abbasid Caliph al-Nasir. Amid mint Dated AH 621 (1224).
- Rule: 1222 – 1232/33
- Predecessor: Nāṣir al-Dīn Maḥmūd
- Successor: None (Hasankeyf taken over by the Ayyubids)
- Died: c. 1232/33
- House: Artuqid
- Father: Nur al-Din Muhammad
- Mother: unnamed concubine
- Religion: Sunni Islam

Rukn al-Dīn Mawdūd (r.1222–1232/33) was a ruler of the Hasankeyf/ Diyarbakır (Amid) branch of the Artuqids. He was a son of Nāṣir al-Dīn Maḥmūd. His reign is marked by his allegiance to the Ayyubids, the ruler of the Ayyubid Empire al-Kamil, and the regional Ayyubid overlord al-Ashraf Musa.

The Ayyubids attacked Rukn al-Dīn Mawdūd directly in 1231–1232 in his territories of Hisn Kayfa and Amid. Following the rule of Rukn al-Dīn Mawdūd, the territories of the Hasankeyf branch of the Artuqids were taken over by the Ayyubids. He was imprisoned in Damascus by Al-Kamil, but managed to flee to Hama upon the latter's death in 1238. He apparently died in Hama at the time of the Mongol invasion.

He commissioned the creation of The Book of Charlatans by Al-Jawbari.
