= Pre-Ottoman Turkey =

Pre-Ottoman Turkey: A General Survey of the Material and Spiritual Culture and History c.1071-1330
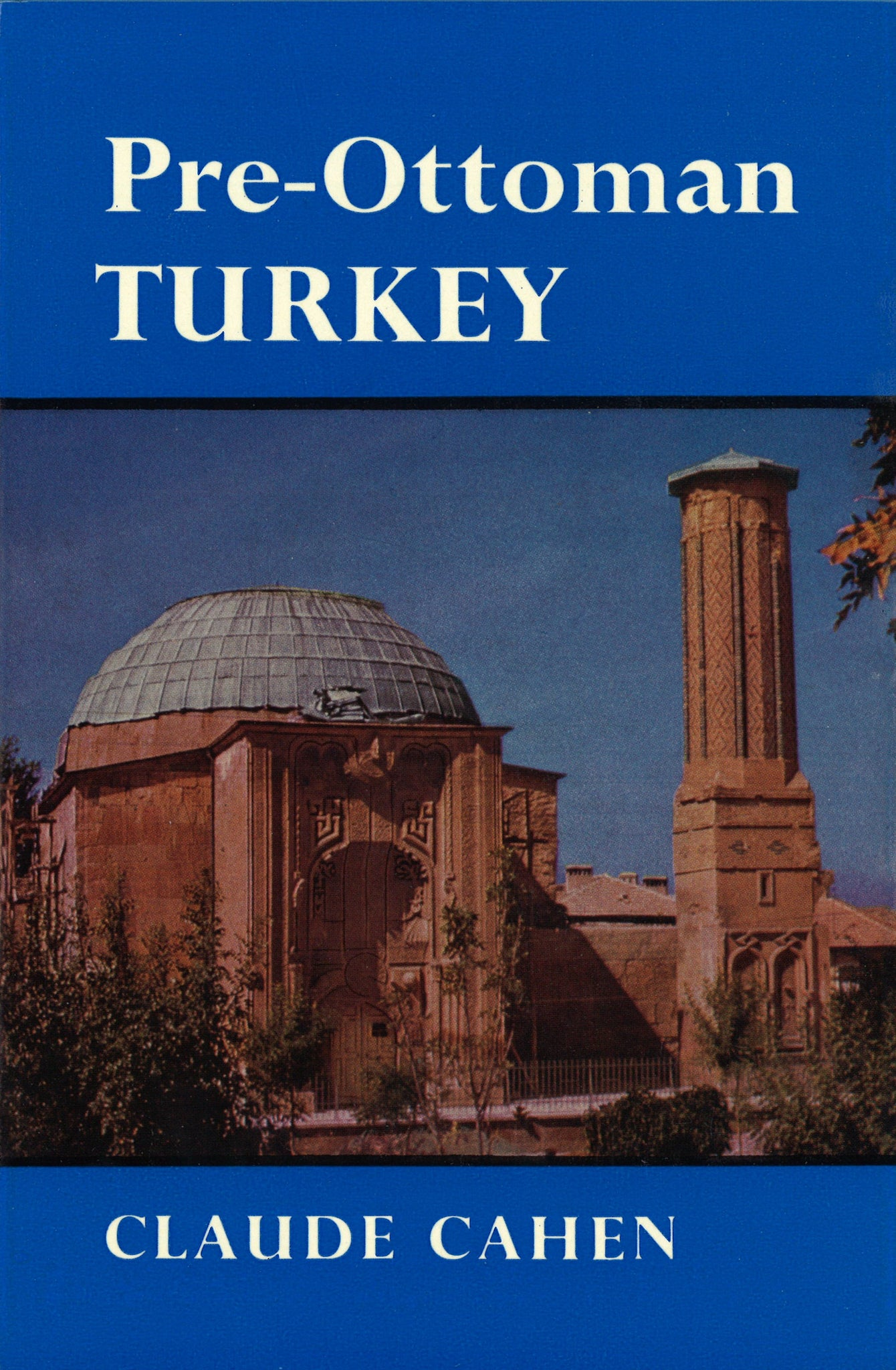
- Author: Claude Cahen
- Publisher: Taplinger Pub Co
- Publication date: 1968
- ISBN: 978-0800865009

Pre-Ottoman Turkey is a book by Claude Cahen, published by Taplinger Pub Co in 1968 and translated from French into English by J. Jones-Williams. The book focuses on pre-Ottoman era of Anatolia via Anatolian beyliks and Seljuk Empire.
