= Quṭb al-Dīn Sukmān II =

Artuqid Emir of Hasankeyf (1185–1201)

- Emir of Hasankeyf
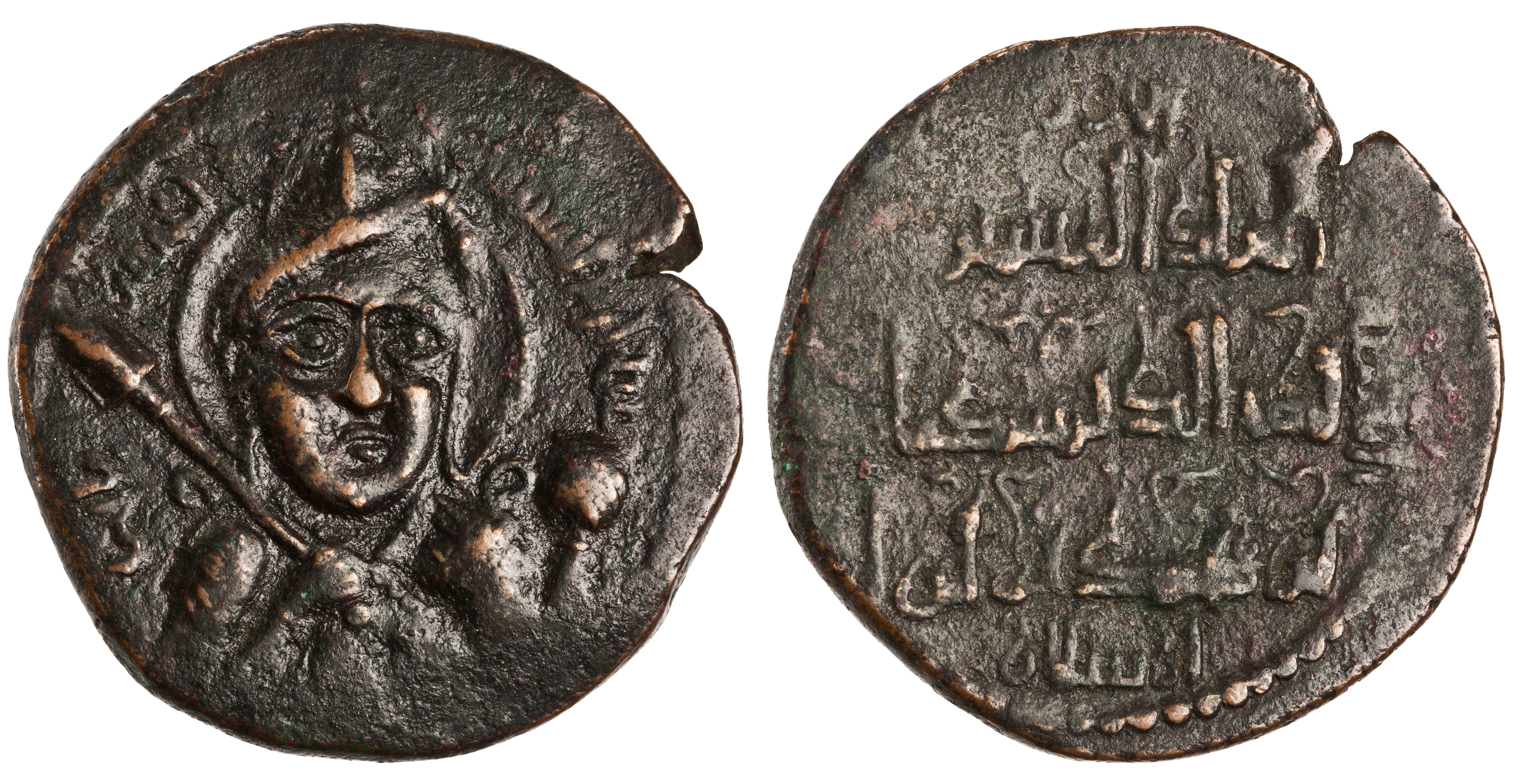
- Copper coin minted with name of Qutb al-Din Sukman and Amir al-Mu'minin–Caliph al-Nasir, Kayfa, 594 AH
- Rule: 1185 – 1201
- Predecessor: Nur al-Din Muhammad
- Successor: Nāsir al-Dīn Maḥmūd
- Died: Hasankeyf
- House: Artuqid
- Father: Nur al-Din Muhammad
- Religion: Sunni Islam

Quṭb al-Dīn Sukmān II, also Sökmen II (ruled 1185–1201), was an Artuqid ruler of the Hasankeyf (Ḥiṣn Kaifā) branch, whose capital was at Diyarbakır (Amid) since 1183. He was the son of Nūr al-Dīn Muḥammad, 1185–1201.

== Sources ==
- Bosworth, Clifford Edmund (2004). The New Islamic Dynasties: A Chronological and Genealogical Manual. Edinburgh University Press. ISBN 0-7486-2137-7.
- Whelan, Estelle (1988), "Representations of the Khassakiyah and the Origins of Mamluk Emblems", in Soucek, Priscilla (ed.), Content and Context of Visual Arts in the Islamic World, University Park, Pennsylvania: Pennsylvania State University Press
