= Ikhtiyar al-Din Hasan ibn Ghafras =

Seljuk vizier

Vizier of the Sultanate of Rum
- Monarch: Kilij Arslan II

Personal details
- Born: Unknown
- Died: 1189 Close to Sebastea

Ikhtiyar al-Din Hasan ibn Ghafras or Ikstiyar al-Din Hasan ibn Gavras (died 1189) was a courtier and long-time Vizier of the Seljuk Sultan of Iconium, Kilij Arslan II.

== Biography ==
=== Origins and role as an ambassador ===
He was a member of the Byzantine Gabras family, very likely identical with, or possibly the son of, an unnamed member of the family who defected to the Sultan in the late reign of Emperor Manuel I Komnenos, became a leading member of the Seljuk court, and served twice as the Seljuk ambassador to the Emperor during the Myriokephalon campaign of 1175–76. According to Niketas Choniates:

The sultan dispatched Gabras, the most honored and esteemed of his officials, to the emperor. [...] On being received by the emperor, Gabras rendered a profound obeisance in the barbarian fashion, and at the same time presented as a gift from the sultan a Nisaean horse with silver-mounted bridle from among those horses kept at rack and manger for use in solemn processions, and he also presented a long, two-edged sword.

Gavras is safely attested from c. 1180 onwards, when he led negotiations with the Sultan Saladin for an alliance. According to historian Anthony Bryer he was "regarded as a wise statesman and noted for the splendour of his robes and personal jewelry".

=== Involvement in the Rum civil war ===
In 1186 Kilij Arslan divided the Sultanate between his 11 sons and 3 daughters. In 1189 the Sultan's eldest son and ruler of Sebastea, Qutub-al-Din Malikshah, attempted to take control of the Sultanate. After gaining the support of the Sultan, Gavras marched to fight him in the region of Caesarea. The men who joined Malikshah dispersed and Malikshah himself retreated to Sebastea. After this victory, Kilij Arslan killed 4,000 Turkomans who had joined his son's side.

=== Assassination ===
The Mengujekid Emir Bahramshah of Arzenjan, son-in-law of the Sultan, arrived and mediated peace between him and his son. By using a trick, he obtained a decree from Kilij Arslan to arrest Gavras and confiscate his possessions. He then sent him to Sebastea. Gavras gathered his sons, relatives, slaves and 200 horsemen and headed torwards the city, where he hoped to retire, but was waylaid by Turkoman raiders who killed him and his sons. The Turkomans then paraded their dismembered remains to terrorize the Christians of the city during a festival.

[...] the Turkomans attacked Hasan, slaughtered him with his sons and slaves, and cut Hasan into pieces. They carried his limbs to Sebastea on the tip of lances. His death took place on the Festivity of the Cross (September 14, 1189).

After his death, his estates were then claimed by Bahramshah.

== Sources ==
- Bryer, Anthony M. (1970). "A Byzantine Family: The Gabrades, c. 979 – c. 1653". University of Birmingham Historical Journal. XII. Birmingham: 164–187. ISSN 0261-2984.
- Krsmanović, Bojana (2003). Γαβράδες. Encyclopaedia of the Hellenic World, Asia Minor.
- Magoulias, Harry J., ed. (1984). O City of Byzantium: Annals of Niketas Choniatēs. Detroit: Wayne State University Press. ISBN 978-0-8143-1764-8.
- Moosa, Matti (2014). The Syriac Chronicle of Michael Rabo (The Great): A Universal History from the Creation, Book Twelve. Archdiocese of the Syriac Orthodox Church for the Eastern United States. ISBN 978-1-939682-09-3.
- Vryonis, Speros (1971). The Decline of Medieval Hellenism in Asia Minor and the Process of Islamization from the Eleventh through the Fifteenth Century. University of California Press. ISBN 0-520-01597-5.
