= Mahmud of Hasankeyf =

Ruler of the Artuqid dynasty from 1201 to 1222

Nāṣir al-Dīn Maḥmūd
- Emir of Hasankeyf
- Rule: 1201 – 1222
- Predecessor: Qutb al-Din Sukman
- Successor: Rukn al-Din Mawdud
- Died: c. 1222; Jazira
- House: Artuqid
- Father: Nur al-Din Muhammad
- Mother: unnamed concubine
- Religion: Sunni Islam

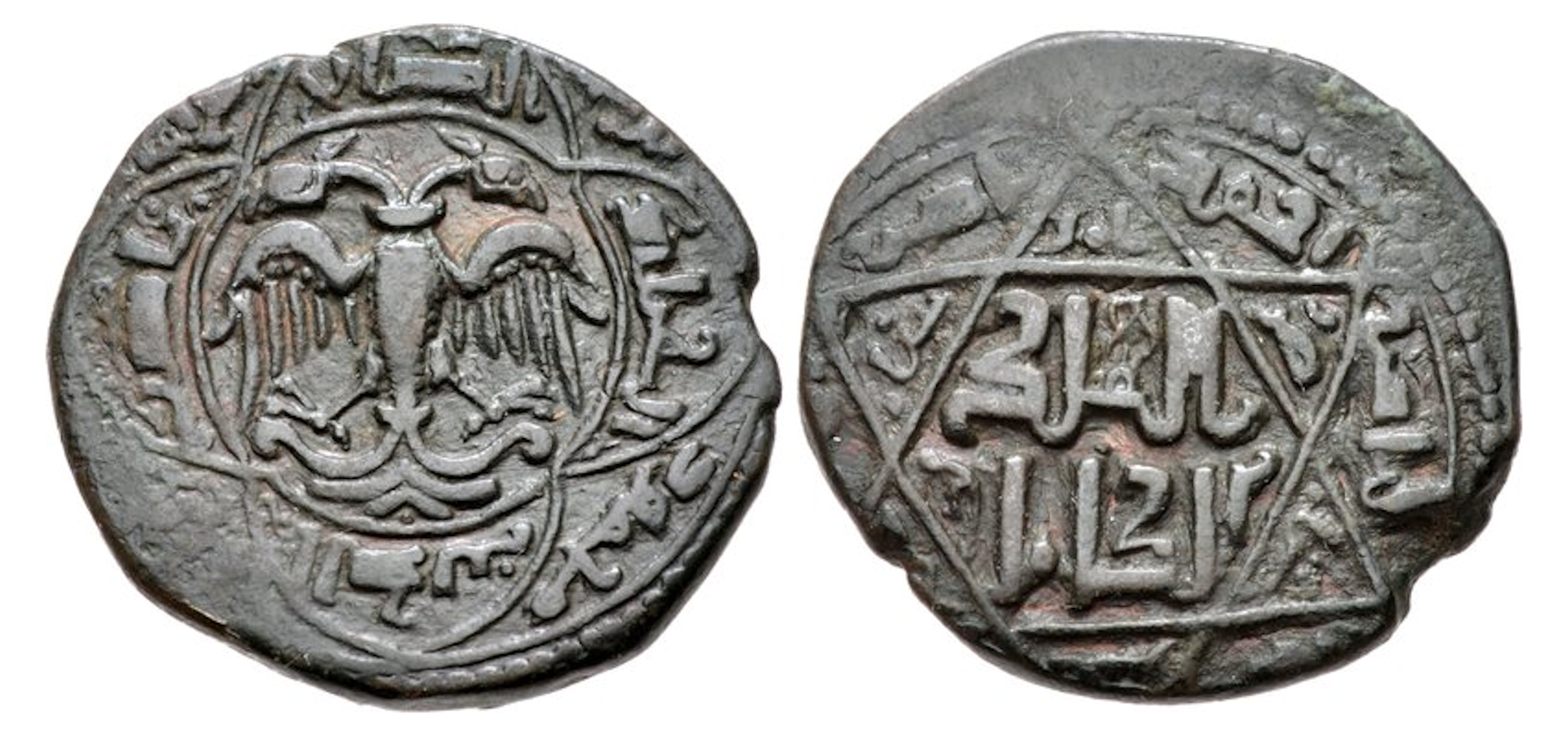
Coinage of Nasir al-Din Mahmud (1200–1222) Amid mint. Dated AH 617 (1220-1 CE). Obv: Double-headed eagle with wings displayed, all within floral quadrilobe, name and titles of Nasir al-Din Mahmud within petals of quadrilobe, continuation of name in outer margin. Rev: Name and title of Ayyubid overlord in two lines; all within hexagram; mint formula and AH date in angles of hexagram; name and titles of Abbasid caliph in outer margins.

Nāṣir al-Dīn Maḥmūd (ruled 1201–1222) was a ruler of the Hasankeyf of the Artuqid dynasty. He was a son of Nūr al-Dīn Muḥammad (1174–1185).

He is particularly known to have commissioned an edition of the Al-Jāmi‘ fī ṣinā‘at al-ḥiyal of Ibn al-Razzaz al-Jazari, devoted to the depiction of mechanical devices in 1206 Amid (modern-day Diyarbakır), in modern Turkey. The miniatures are thought to reflect various aspects of the Artuqid court at the time.

== Gallery ==
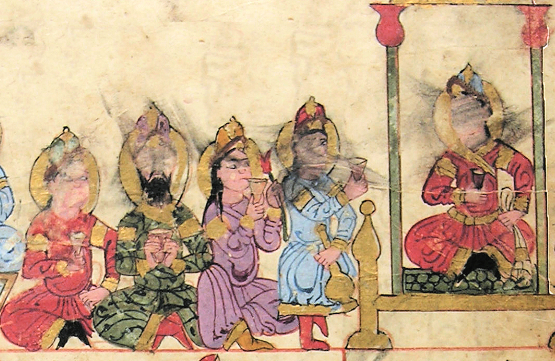
Court scene. Amid, modern-day Diyarbakır, Turkey, 1206 (Ms. Ahmet III 3472).

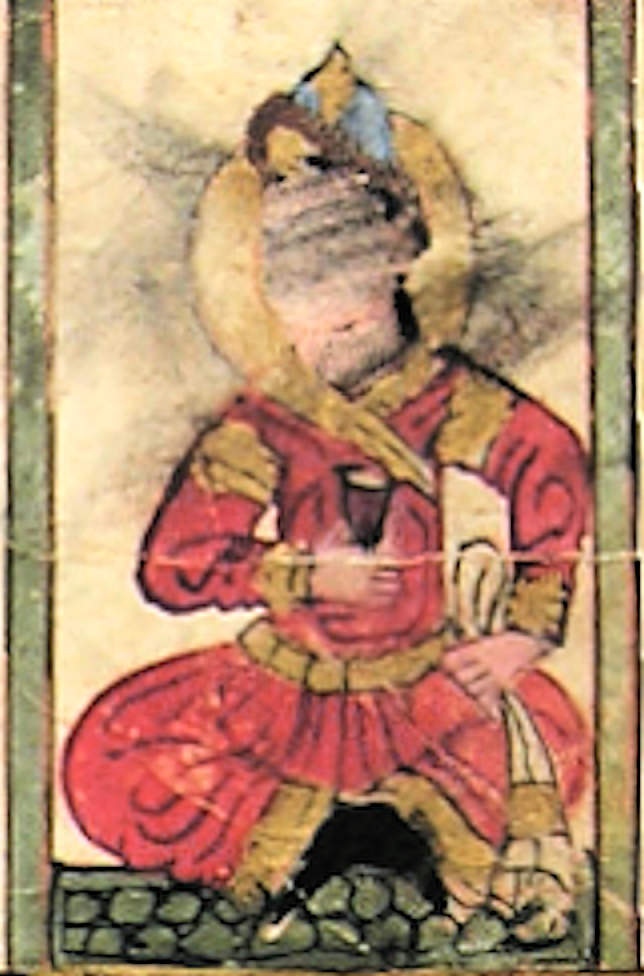
Ruler (court scene detail). Amid, modern-day Diyarbakır, Turkey, 1206 (Ms. Ahmet III 3472).

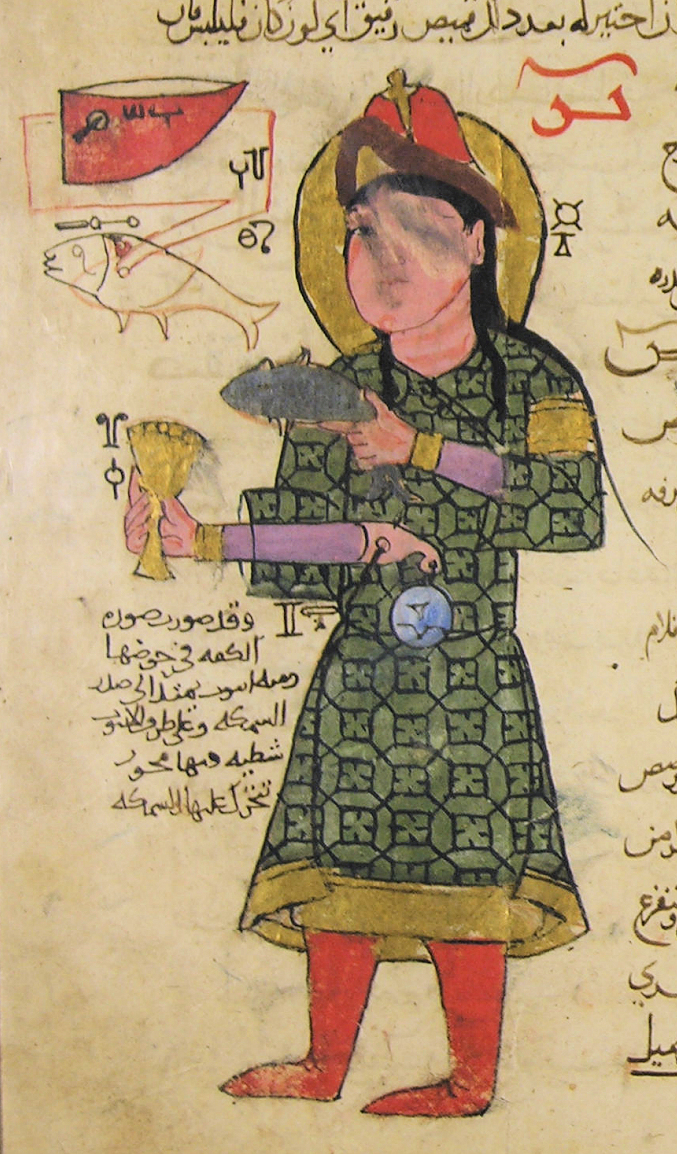
Turkic figure. Amid, modern-day Diyarbakır, Turkey, 1206 (Ms. Ahmet III 3472).

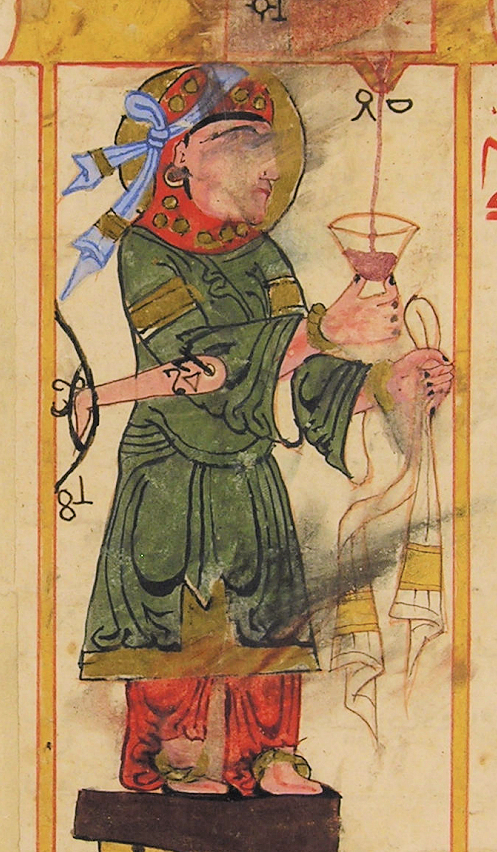
Female servant. Amid, modern-day Diyarbakır, Turkey, 1206 (Ms. Ahmet III 3472).

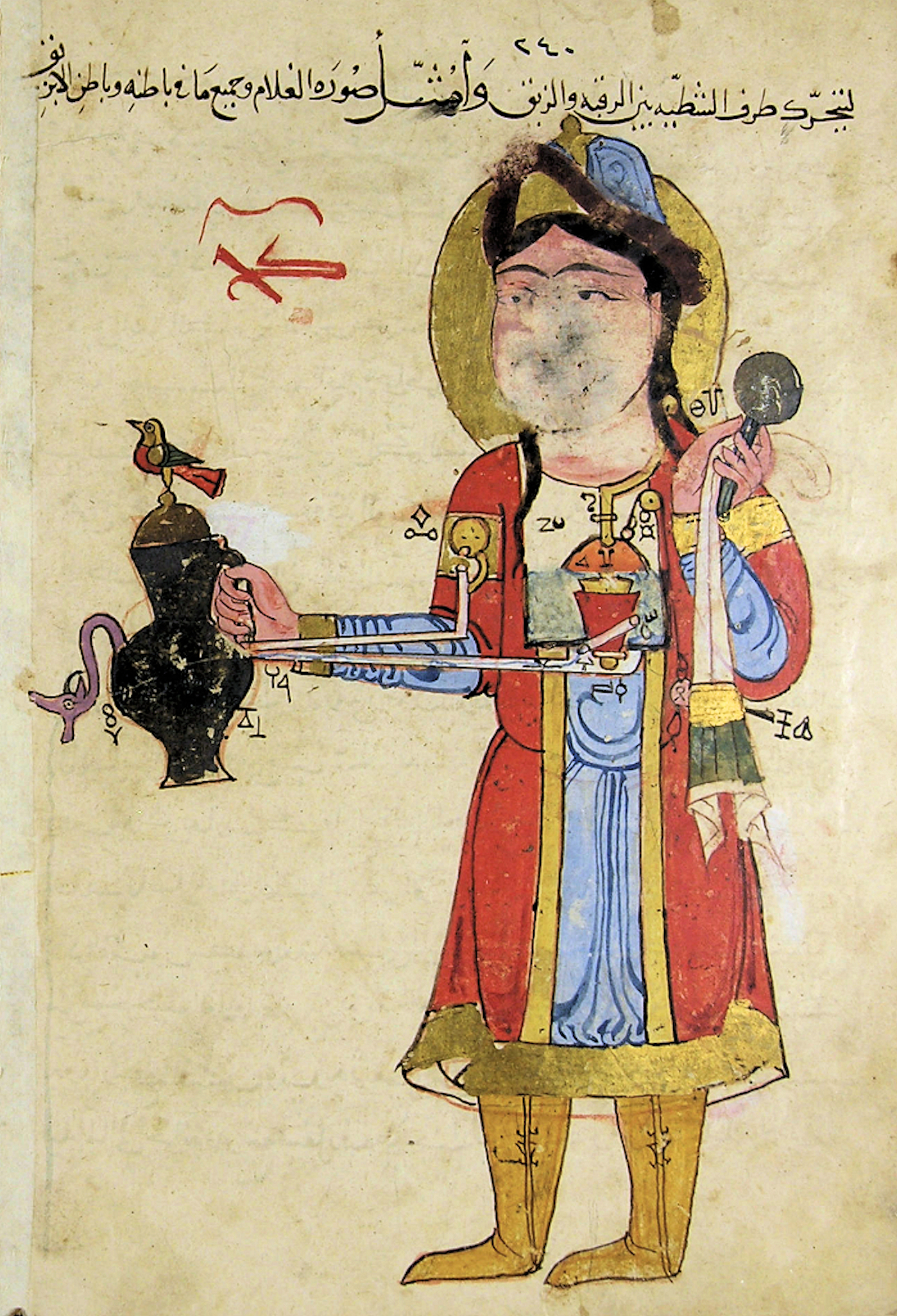
Turkic figure. Amid, modern-day Diyarbakır, Turkey, 1206 (Ms. Ahmet III 3472).

== Sources ==
- Whelan, Estelle (1988), "Representations of the Khassakiyah and the Origins of Mamluk Emblems", in Soucek, Priscilla (ed.), Content and Context of Visual Arts in the Islamic World, University Park, Pennsylvania: Pennsylvania State University Press
