= Claude Cahen =

French Marxist Orientalist and historian (1909–1991)

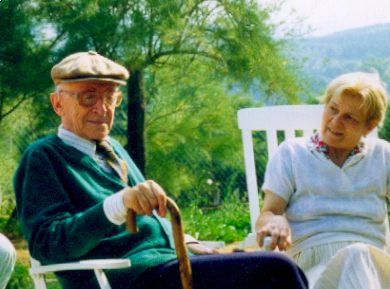
- Claude Cahen and his wife (1989)
- Born: Claude Cahen; 26 February 1909; Paris, France
- Died: 18 November 1991 (aged 82)
- Education: École Normale Supérieure, Institut national des langues et civilisations orientales
- Occupations: Orientalist, historian
- Notable work: "An Introduction to the First Crusade" (1954)
- Political party: French Communist Party (1930s–1960)
- Movement: Marxism
- Children: 6 (including Michel Cahen)
- Awards: Elected to Académie des Inscriptions et Belles-Lettres (1973); Member of American Philosophical Society (1983)

Claude Cahen (26 February 1909 – 18 November 1991) was a French Marxist orientalist and historian. He specialized in the studies of the Islamic Middle Ages, Muslim sources about the Crusades, and social history of the medieval Islamic society (works on Futuwa orders).

Claude Cahen was born in Paris to a French Jewish family. After studying at the École Normale Supérieure on the rue d'Ulm, he attended the Institut national des langues et civilisations orientales, receiving a doctorate in 1940. He was a professor at the University of Strasbourg from 1945 to 1959 and then at the Sorbonne; in 1967 he was invited to teach at the University of Michigan, and in 1973, he was elected to the Académie des Inscriptions et Belles-Lettres. He was later elected to the American Philosophical Society in 1983.

Cahen was married and had six children, including the historian Michel Cahen, who wrote a biography of his father. Cahen was a member of the French Communist Party from the 1930s until 1960, and remained an active Marxist afterwards. Despite his origins, he neither self-identified as Jewish nor supported the State of Israel.

In 1954 he published "An Introduction to the First Crusade" in the Oxford journal Past and Present. Cahen has been called "the doyen of Islamic social history and one of the most influential Islamic historians of [his] century," and "the best historian of the Middle East in the twentieth century." Mark Cohen describes him as a distinguished Islamic historian. He was a prisoner of war in World War II. The Festschrift Itineraires d'Orient: Hommages a Claude Cahen, edited by Raoul Curiel and Rika Gyselen, appeared in 1995 as an honor to his "distinguished career", and an issue of the journal Arabica (43/1 (1996)) was dedicated to him. That issue also includes a nearly complete bibliography of his works.

== Works ==
- La Syrie du Nord à l'époque des Croisades et la principauté franque d'Antioche, thèse de doctorat es-Lettres, Université de Paris, éditions P. Geuthner (1940). ASIN : B001D5E1AQ ASIN : B0018H4LZO
- Le régime féodal de l'Italie Normande, 145 pages, thèse complémentaire de l'Université de Paris, éditions P. Geuthner (1940). LCCN 42034209
- « L'histoire économique et sociale de l'Orient musulman médiéval », in Studia Islamica, Paris (1955).
- « Les facteurs économiques et sociaux dans l'ankylose culturelle de l'Islam », in Classicisme et déclin culturel dans l'histoire de l'Islam, Symposium de Bordeaux (juin 1956), 396 pages, éditions Besson et Chantemerle (1957).
- « Mouvements populaires et autonomismes urbains dans l'Asie musulmane du Moyen Âge », in Arabica, Brill Academic Publishers (1958–1959). Tiré à part de 91 pages (Part I, Arabica V, (p. 225–250), Part II, Arabica VI, (p. 25–56), Part III, Arabica VI, (p. 233–265) LC DS223 C24 1959
- « La changeante portée sociale de quelques doctrines religieuses », in L'élaboration de l'Islam, compte rendu du Colloque de Strasbourg sur l'Islam (juin 1959), 127 pages éditions PUF (1961).
- « Points de vue sur la Révolution abbaside », dans Revue historique (1963).
- Douanes et commerce dans les ports méditerranéens de l'Égypte médiévale (d'après al-Makhzumi. Minhaj), 314 pages, éditions E.J. Brill, Leiden, 1964.
- Pre-Ottoman Turkey, 458 pages, éditions Sidg. & J, 1968. ISBN 028335254X, 978-0283352546
  - traduction française augmentée : La Turquie pré-ottomane, 409 pages, Institut français d'études anatoliennes, éditions Varia Turcica (1988). ISBN 2906053066, 978-2906053069
- « Baba Ishaq, Baba Ilyas, Hadjdji Bektash et quelques autres », in Turcica, 1 (1969), (p. 53–64).
- Turco-Byzantina et Oriens Christianus, Londres, Variorum Reprints, 1974.
- Les Peuples musulmans dans l'histoire médiévale, 496 pages, éditions Institut français de Damas (1977). ASIN : B0000E8UM0
- Makhzûmiyyât : Études sur l'histoire économique et financière de l'Égypte médiévale (1977), 225 pages, Brill Academic Publishers (1 August 1997). ISBN 9004049274, 978-9004049277
- Introduction à l'histoire du monde musulman médiéval : VIIe–XVe, 216 pages, éditions Maisonneuve (nouv. éd, 1983). ISBN 2720010146, 978-2720010149
- « djaych » (armée) et « hisba » (police des mœurs et des marchés), contributions à l'Encyclopédie de l'Islam, E.I.2, Brill Academic Publishers, respectivement : volume II (1986), (p. 517–524) et volume III (1991), (p. 503–510).
- Orient et Occident au temps des croisades, 302 pages (1983) (restitue les croisades dans le contexte d'une histoire méditerranéenne), éditions Aubier Montaigne (24 septembre 1992). ISBN 2700720164, 978-2700720167
- L'Islam, des origines au début de l'Empire ottoman, poche, 413 pages (réédition mise à jour ), éditions Hachette Littérature (17 September 1997). ISBN 2012788521, 978-2012788527

Références :

« Claude Cahen : histoire et engagement politique. Entretien avec Maxime Rodinson » (propos recueillis par D. Gazagnadou et F. Micheau, bibliographie exhaustive des ouvrages, articles et comptes-rendus de Claude Cahen), Arabica (Brill éditeur), vol. 43, n°1 (1996), (p. 7–27). Revue Arabica
