= First Crusade =

1096–1099 Christian re-conquest of the Holy Land

- Part of the Crusades
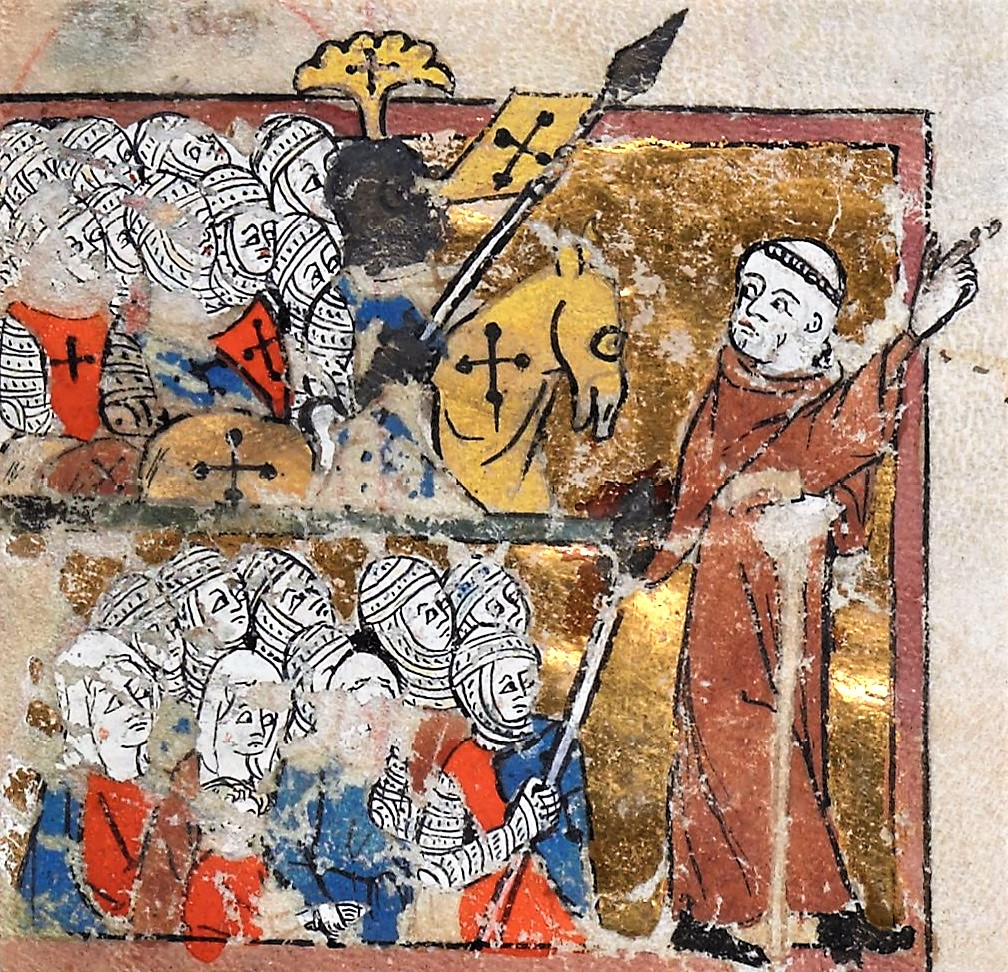
- Miniature of Peter the Hermit leading the People's Crusade (Egerton 1500, Avignon, 14th-century)
Date	15 August 1096 (Note: Pope Urban II established the Feast of Assumption (15 August 1096) as the official start date of the holy war, but the forces of the People's Crusade began to march months before, in April.) – 12 August 1099
Location	The Levant and Anatolia
Result	Crusader victory
Territorial changes	The Crusade assists in capturing Nicaea, restoring much of western Anatolia to the Byzantine Empire; The Crusaders successfully capture Jerusalem and establish the Crusader states

Belligerents
Crusader armies Army of Raymond of Saint-Gilles; Army of Godfrey of Bouillon; Army of Robert Curthose; Army of Robert II of Flanders; Army of Hugh the Great; Armies of Bohemond of Taranto; Armies of the People's Crusade; Byzantine Empire	Muslim States; Seljuk Empire; Sultanate of Rum; Danishmendids; Fatimid Caliphate

Commanders and leaders
Crusader armies Raymond IV of Toulouse; Adhemar of Le Puy # Godfrey of Bouillon; Baldwin of Boulogne; Hugh of Vermandois; Stephen of Blois; Robert II of Flanders; Robert Curthose; Peter the Hermit; Bohemond of Taranto; Tancred; Byzantine Empire; Alexios I Komnenos; Tatikios; Manuel Boutoumites	Seljuks; Kilij Arslan I Yaghi-Siyan †; Kerbogha; Duqaq; Ridwan; Toghtekin; Janah ad-Dawla; Fatimids; Iftikhar al-Dawla; Al-Afdal Shahanshah

Strength
Crusaders; Estimated at 130,000 to 160,000 * 80,000 to 120,000 infantry * 17,000 to 30,000 knights	Muslims; Unknown

Casualties and losses
Moderate or heavy (estimates vary)	Very heavy

The First Crusade (1096–1099) was the first of a series of religious wars, or Crusades, which were initiated, supported and at times directed by the Latin Church in the Middle Ages. Their aim was to return the Holy Land to Christian rule after its conquest by the Rashidun Caliphate in the 7th century. By the 11th century, although Jerusalem had then been ruled by Muslims for hundreds of years, the practices of the Seljuk rulers in the region began to threaten local Christian populations, pilgrimages from the West, and the Byzantine Empire itself. The earliest impetus for the First Crusade came in 1095 when Byzantine emperor Alexios I Komnenos sent ambassadors to the Council of Piacenza to request military support in the empire's conflict with the Seljuk-led Turks. This was followed later in the year by the Council of Clermont, at which Pope Urban II gave a speech supporting the Byzantine request and urging faithful Christians to undertake an armed pilgrimage to Jerusalem.

This call was met with an enthusiastic popular response across all social classes in western Europe. Thousands of predominantly poor Christians, led by the French priest Peter the Hermit, were the first to respond. What has become known as the People's Crusade passed through Germany and indulged in wide-ranging anti-Jewish activities, including the Rhineland massacres. On leaving Byzantine-controlled territory in Anatolia, they were annihilated in a Turkish ambush led by the Seljuk Kilij Arslan I at the Battle of Civetot in October 1096.

In what has become known as the Princes' Crusade, members of the high nobility and their followers embarked in late-summer 1096 and arrived at Constantinople between November and April the following year. This was a large feudal host led by notable Western European princes: southern French forces under Raymond IV of Toulouse and Adhemar of Le Puy; men from Upper and Lower Lorraine led by Godfrey of Bouillon and his brother Baldwin of Boulogne; Italo-Norman forces led by Bohemond of Taranto and his nephew Tancred; as well as various contingents consisting of northern French and Flemish forces under Robert Curthose of Normandy, Stephen of Blois, Hugh of Vermandois, and Robert II of Flanders. In total and including non-combatants, the forces are estimated to have numbered as many as 100,000.

The crusader forces gradually arrived in Anatolia. With Kilij Arslan absent, a Frankish attack and Byzantine naval assault during the Siege of Nicaea in June 1097 resulted in an initial crusader victory. In July, the crusaders won the Battle of Dorylaeum, fighting Turkish lightly armoured mounted archers. After a difficult march through Anatolia, the crusaders began the Siege of Antioch, capturing the city in June 1098. Jerusalem, then ruled by the Fatimids, was reached in June 1099, and the ensuing Siege of Jerusalem culminated in the Crusader armies storming and capturing the city on 15 July 1099, during which assault a large fraction of the residents were massacred. A Fatimid counterattack was repulsed later that year at the Battle of Ascalon, which marked the end of the First Crusade. Afterwards, most of the crusaders returned home.

Four Crusader states were established in the Holy Land: the Kingdom of Jerusalem, the County of Edessa, the Principality of Antioch, and the County of Tripoli. The Crusaders maintained some form of presence in the region until the loss of the last major Crusader stronghold in the 1291 Siege of Acre, after which there were no further substantive Christian campaigns in the Levant.

== Historical context ==
Christian and Muslim states had been in conflict since the establishment of Islam in the 7th century. In the span of approximately 120 years after the death of the Islamic prophet Muhammad in 632, Muslim forces conquered the Levant (including Jerusalem), as well as North Africa and most of the Iberian Peninsula, all of which had previously been under Christian rule. By the 11th century, Christians were—through the Reconquista—gradually reversing the 8th-century Muslim conquest of Iberia, but their ties to the Holy Land had deteriorated. Muslim authorities in the Levant often enforced harsh rules against any overt expressions of the Christian faith. Approximately two-thirds of land held by Christians had been conquered by Muslim forces prior to the First Crusade.

The First Crusade was the response of the Christian world to the expansion of Islam, due to the Fatimids and Seljuks, into the Holy Land and Byzantium. In Western Europe, Jerusalem was an increasingly important destination for Christian pilgrimages. While the Seljuk hold on Jerusalem was weak (the group later lost the city to the Fatimids), returning pilgrims reported difficulties and the oppression of Christians. The Byzantine need for military support coincided with an increase in the willingness of the western European warrior class to accept papal military command.

=== Situation in Europe ===
By the 11th century, the population of Europe had increased greatly as technological and agricultural innovations allowed trade to flourish. The Catholic Church had become a dominant influence on Western civilisation. Society was organised by manorialism and feudalism, political structures whereby knights and other nobles owed military service to their overlords in return for the right to rent from lands and manors.

Between 1050 and 1080, the Gregorian Reform movement adopted increasingly assertive policies to expand its power and influence. This prompted conflict with eastern Christians rooted in the doctrine of papal supremacy. The Eastern church viewed the pope as only one of the five patriarchs of the Church, alongside the patriarchates of Alexandria, Antioch, Constantinople and Jerusalem. In 1054, theological disputes over Papal Supremacy, Eucharistic practices, and the insertion of the Filioque Clause into the Nicene Creed prompted Pope Leo IX to send a legation to Patriarch Michael I Cerularius of Constantinople, which ended in mutual excommunication and the East–West Schism.

Early Christians were used to the employment of violence for communal purposes. A Christian theology of war inevitably evolved from the point when Roman citizenship and Christianity became linked. Citizens were required to fight against the empire's enemies. Dating from the works of the 4th-century theologian Augustine of Hippo, a doctrine of holy war developed. Augustine wrote that aggressive war was sinful, but war could be justified if proclaimed by a legitimate authority such as a king or bishop, it was defensive or for the recovery of lands, and it did not involve excessive violence. The breakdown of the Carolingian Empire in Western Europe created a warrior caste who now had little to do but fight amongst themselves. Violent acts were commonly used for dispute resolution, and the papacy attempted to mitigate it.

Pope Alexander II developed recruitment systems via oaths for military resourcing that Pope Gregory VII further extended across Europe. These were deployed by the Church in the Christian conflicts with Muslims in the Iberian Peninsula and for the Norman conquest of Sicily. Gregory went further in 1074, planning a display of military power to reinforce the principle of papal sovereignty in a holy war supporting Byzantium against the Seljuks, but was unable to build support for this. Theologian Anselm of Lucca took the decisive step towards an authentic crusader ideology, stating that fighting for legitimate purposes could result in the remission of sins.

Christian and Muslim holdings in Iberia in 1060

On the Iberian Peninsula, there was no significant Christian polity. The Christian realms of León, Navarre, and Catalonia lacked a common identity or shared history based on tribe or ethnicity, resulting in frequent periods of unity and division during the 11th and 12th centuries. Although small, all developed an aristocratic military technique and, in 1031, the disintegration of the Caliphate of Córdoba in southern Spain created the opportunity for the territorial gains that later became known as the Reconquista. In 1063, William VIII of Aquitaine led a combined force of French, Aragonese and Catalan knights in the Siege of Barbastro, taking the city that had been in Muslim hands since the year 711. This had the full support of Alexander II, and a truce was declared in Catalonia with indulgences granted to the participants. It was a holy war but differed from the First Crusade in that there was no pilgrimage, no vow, and no formal authorisation by the church. Shortly before the First Crusade, Urban II had encouraged the Iberian Christians to take Tarragona, using much of the same symbolism and rhetoric that was later used to preach the crusade to the people of Europe.

The Italo-Normans were successful in seizing much of Southern Italy and Sicily from the Byzantines and North African Arabs in the decades before the First Crusade. These conquests provoked a papal campaign led by Pope Leo IX, whom they defeated at the Battle of Civitate. Nevertheless, when they invaded Muslim Sicily in 1059, they did so under the papal banner Invexillum sancti Petrior, or banner of St. Peter. Robert Guiscard captured the Byzantine city of Bari in 1071 and campaigned along the Eastern Adriatic coast around Dyrrachium in 1081 and 1085.

=== Situation in the East ===
The Byzantine Empire (867–1081)

Since its founding, the Byzantine Empire was a historic centre of wealth, culture and military power. Under Basil II, the territorial recovery of the empire reached its furthest extent in 1025. The empire's frontiers extended east to Iran, and it controlled Bulgaria and much of southern Italy. Piracy in the Mediterranean had also been suppressed. Relations with the Empire's Islamic neighbours were no more quarrelsome than relations with the Slavs or Western Christians. Normans in Italy; Pechenegs, Serbs and Cumans to the north; and Seljuk Turks in the east all competed with the Empire, and to meet these challenges the emperors recruited mercenaries, even on occasion from their enemies.

The Islamic world also experienced great success since its foundation in the 7th century, with major changes to come. The first waves of Turkic migration into the Middle East enmeshed Arab and Turkic history from the 9th century. The status quo in Western Asia was challenged by later waves of Turkish migration, particularly the arrival of the Seljuk Turks in the 10th century. These were a minor ruling clan from Transoxania. They converted to Islam and migrated to Iran to seek their fortune. In the following two decades they conquered Iran, Iraq and the Near East. The Seljuks and their followers were Sunni Muslims, which led to conflict in Palestine and Syria with the Shi'ite Fatimid Caliphate.

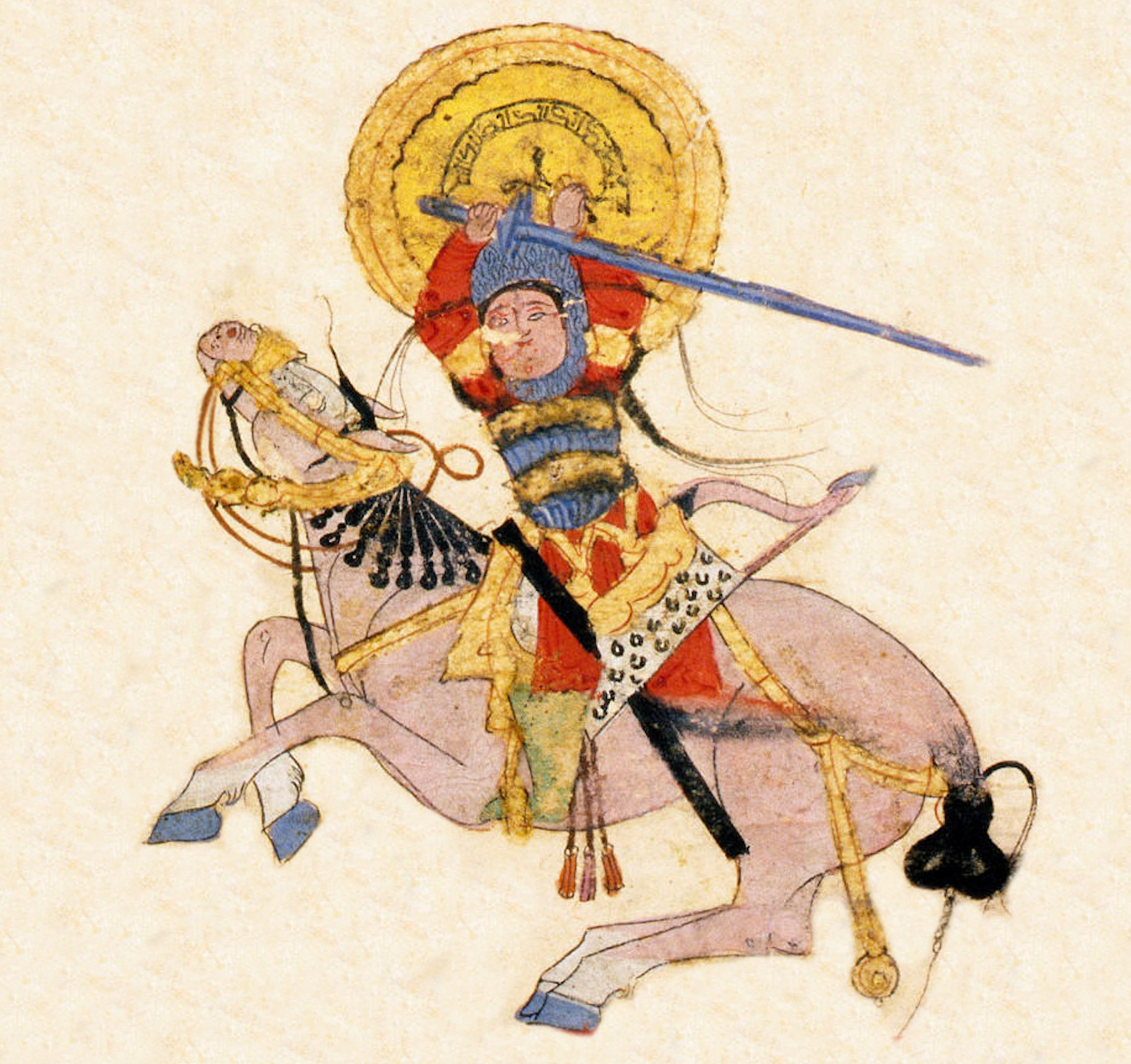
Anatolian Seljuk horseman, in Varka and Golshah, mid-13th century miniature (detail), Konya, Sultanate of Rum.

The Seljuks were nomads, Turkish-speaking, and occasionally shamanistic, unlike their sedentary, Arabic-speaking subjects. This was a difference that weakened power structures when combined with the Seljuks' habitual governance of territory based on political preferment and competition between independent princes rather than geography. Romanos IV Diogenes attempted to suppress the Seljuks' sporadic raiding, but was defeated at the Battle of Manzikert in 1071, the only time in history that a Byzantine emperor became the prisoner of a Muslim commander. The battle was a stinging setback that presaged notable Seljuk gains, and contributed to the call for the First Crusade. Key cities such as Nicaea and Antioch were lost in 1081 and 1086 respectively, cities that were especially famous in the West due to their historical significance and would later also be targets of reconquest by the crusader armies.

From 1092, the status quo in the Middle East disintegrated following the death of the effective ruler of the Seljuk Empire, Nizam al-Mulk. This was closely followed by the deaths of the Seljuk sultan Malik-Shah and the Fatimid caliph al-Mustansir Billah. Wracked by confusion and division, the Islamic world disregarded the world beyond, so that, when the First Crusade arrived, it came as a surprise. Malik-Shah was succeeded in the Anatolian Sultanate of Rûm by Kilij Arslan, and in Syria by his brother Tutush I who started a civil war against Berkyaruq to become sultan himself. When Tutush was killed in 1095, his sons Ridwan and Duqaq inherited Aleppo and Damascus, respectively, further dividing Syria amongst emirs antagonistic towards each other, as well as Kerbogha, the atabeg of Mosul. Egypt and much of Palestine were controlled by the Fatimids. The Fatimids, under the nominal rule of caliph al-Musta'li but actually controlled by vizier al-Afdal Shahanshah, lost Jerusalem to the Seljuks in 1073 but succeeded in recapturing the city in 1098 from the Artuqids, a smaller Turkish tribe associated with the Seljuks, just before the arrival of the crusaders.

=== Persecution of Christians ===
According to historian Jonathan Riley-Smith and sociologist of religion Rodney Stark, Muslim authorities in the Holy Land often enforced harsh rules "against any open expressions of the Christian faith": Stark maintained;

In 1026 Richard of Saint-Vanne was stoned to death after he was seen saying Mass. Muslim officials also ignored the constant robberies and massacres of Christian pilgrims, such as an incident in 1064 in which Muslims ambushed four German bishops and a party of several thousand pilgrims as they entered the Holy Land, slaughtering two-thirds of them

Stark appears to be mis-quoting Hugh of Flavigny, who did indicate that locals threw stones at Richard, but, Richard did not die - he retired to a hermitage near Remiremont Abbey, but returned to Saint-Vanne around 1039.

The persecution of Christians intensified following the invasion by the Seljuk Turks. Villages occupied by Turks along the route to Jerusalem began exacting tolls on Christian pilgrims. In principle, the Seljuks allowed pilgrims access to Jerusalem, but they often imposed huge tariffs and condoned local attacks. Many pilgrims were kidnapped and sold into slavery while others were tortured. Soon only large, well-armed groups would dare to attempt a pilgrimage, and even so, many died and many more turned back. The pilgrims that survived these extremely dangerous journeys, "returned to the West weary and impoverished, with a dreadful tale to tell." News of these deadly attacks on pilgrims as well as the persecution of the native Eastern Christians caused anger in Europe.

News of these persecutions reached European Christians in the West in the few years after the Battle of Manzikert. A Frankish eyewitness says: "Far and wide they [Muslim Turks] ravaged cities and castles together with their settlements. Churches were razed down to the ground. Of the clergyman and monks whom they captured, some were slaughtered while others were with unspeakable wickedness given up, priests and all, to their dire dominion and nuns—alas for the sorrow of it!—were subjected to their lusts." It was in this climate that the Byzantine emperor Alexios I Komnenos wrote a letter to Robert II of Flanders saying

The holy places are desecrated and destroyed in countless ways. Noble matrons and their daughters, robbed of everything, are violated one after another, like animals. Some [of their attackers] shamelessly place virgins in front of their own mothers and force them to sing wicked and obscene songs until they have finished having their ways with them... men of every age and description, boys, youths, old men, nobles, peasants and what is worse still and yet more distressing, clerics and monks and woe of unprecedented woes, even bishops are defiled with the sin of sodomy and it is now trumpeted abroad that one bishop has succumbed to this abominable sin.

The emperor warned that if Constantinople fell to the Turks, not only would thousands more Christians be tortured, raped and murdered, but "the most holy relics of the Saviour," gathered over the centuries, would be lost. "Therefore in the name of God... we implore you to bring this city all the faithful soldiers of Christ... in your coming you will find your reward in heaven, and if you do not come, God will condemn you."

=== Destruction of the Church of the Holy Sepulchre ===
In 996, the "mad caliph" al-Hakim bi-Amr Allah rose to power in the heterodox Ismaili Shi'a Fatimid dynasty, which controlled Jerusalem at the time. Reports differ as to whether he was mad or merely eccentric. What is certain is that he was determined to completely annihilate his Christian and Jewish subjects. His administration was marked by confiscation of property, pillage, humiliation, imprisonment, and executions. Al-Hakim enforced distinctive dress on Christians, whom he commanded to wear a five-pound cross, and on Jews, who were required to hang a heavy bell around their neck. Christians were barred from administrative positions and churches were demolished.

In 1009 al-Hakim ordered Yaruk, governor of Ramla, "to demolish the church of the Resurrection and to remove its symbols, and to get rid of all trace and remembrance of it." This referred to the Church of the Holy Sepulchre, the site where Christians believed Jesus was entombed. The church was "knocked to its foundations," and even much of the cave was scraped away. Constantine's church of the Martyrion was demolished and has yet to be rebuilt. Later, al-Hakim's successor permitted reconstruction of the church, although the destruction done to the grotto was permanent. News of this outrage was spread through Europe by multiple eyewitnesses, including Ulric, bishop of Orléans and Adémar of Chabannes, and contributed to the zealous response to Pope Urban II's call for the First Crusade.

== Council of Clermont ==
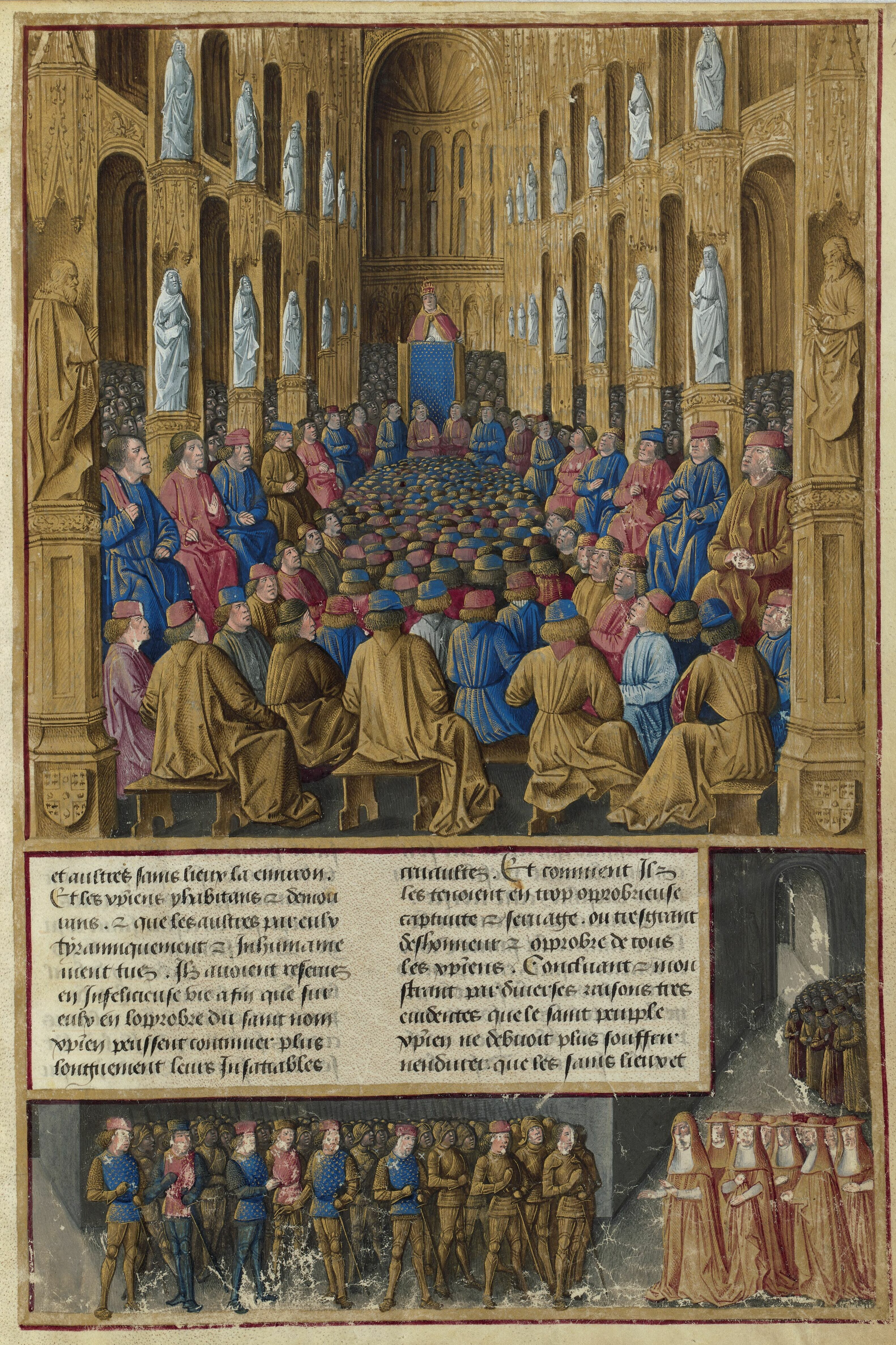
Pope Urban II at the Council of Clermont. Illustration from a copy of Sébastien Mamerot's Livre des Passages d'Outremer (Jean Colombe, c. 1472–75, BNF Fr. 5594)

The major ecclesiastical impetuses behind the First Crusade were the Council of Piacenza and subsequent Council of Clermont, both held in 1095 by Pope Urban II, and resulted in the mobilisation of Western Europe to go to the Holy Land. Emperor Alexios, who worried about the advances of the Seljuks into his territory, sent envoys to the Council of Piacenza in March 1095 to ask Urban for aid against the invading Turks.

Urban responded favourably, perhaps hoping to heal the East-West Schism of forty years earlier, and to reunite the Church under papal primacy by helping the Eastern churches in their time of need. Alexios and Urban had previously been in close contact in 1089 and after, and had discussed openly the prospect of the reunion of the Christian churches. There were signs of considerable cooperation between Rome and Constantinople in the years immediately before the crusade.

In July 1095, Urban turned to his homeland of France to recruit men for the expedition. His travels there culminated in the ten-day Council of Clermont, where on 27 November he gave an impassioned sermon to a large audience of French nobles and clergy. There are five versions of the speech recorded by people who may have been at the council (Baldric of Dol, Guibert of Nogent, Robert the Monk, and Fulcher of Chartres) or who went on crusade (Fulcher and the anonymous author of the Gesta Francorum), as well as other versions found in the works of later historians (such as William of Malmesbury and William of Tyre). All of these versions were written after Jerusalem had been captured, and it is difficult to know what was actually said versus what was recreated in the aftermath of the successful crusade. The only contemporary records are a few letters written by Urban in 1095. It is also thought that Urban also may have preached the crusade at Piacenza, but the only record of which is by Bernold of St. Blasien in his Chronicon.

The five versions of the speech differ widely from one another regarding particulars, but all versions except that in the Gesta Francorum agree that Urban talked about the violence of European society and the necessity of maintaining the Peace of God; about helping the Greeks, who had asked for assistance; about the crimes being committed against Christians in the east; and about a new kind of war, an armed pilgrimage, and of rewards in heaven, where remission of sins was offered to any who might die in the undertaking. They do not all specifically mention Jerusalem as the ultimate goal. However, it has been argued that Urban's subsequent preaching reveals that he expected the expedition to reach Jerusalem all along. According to one version of the speech, the enthusiastic crowd responded with cries of Deus lo volt!—God wills it.

== Peter the Hermit and the People's Crusade ==
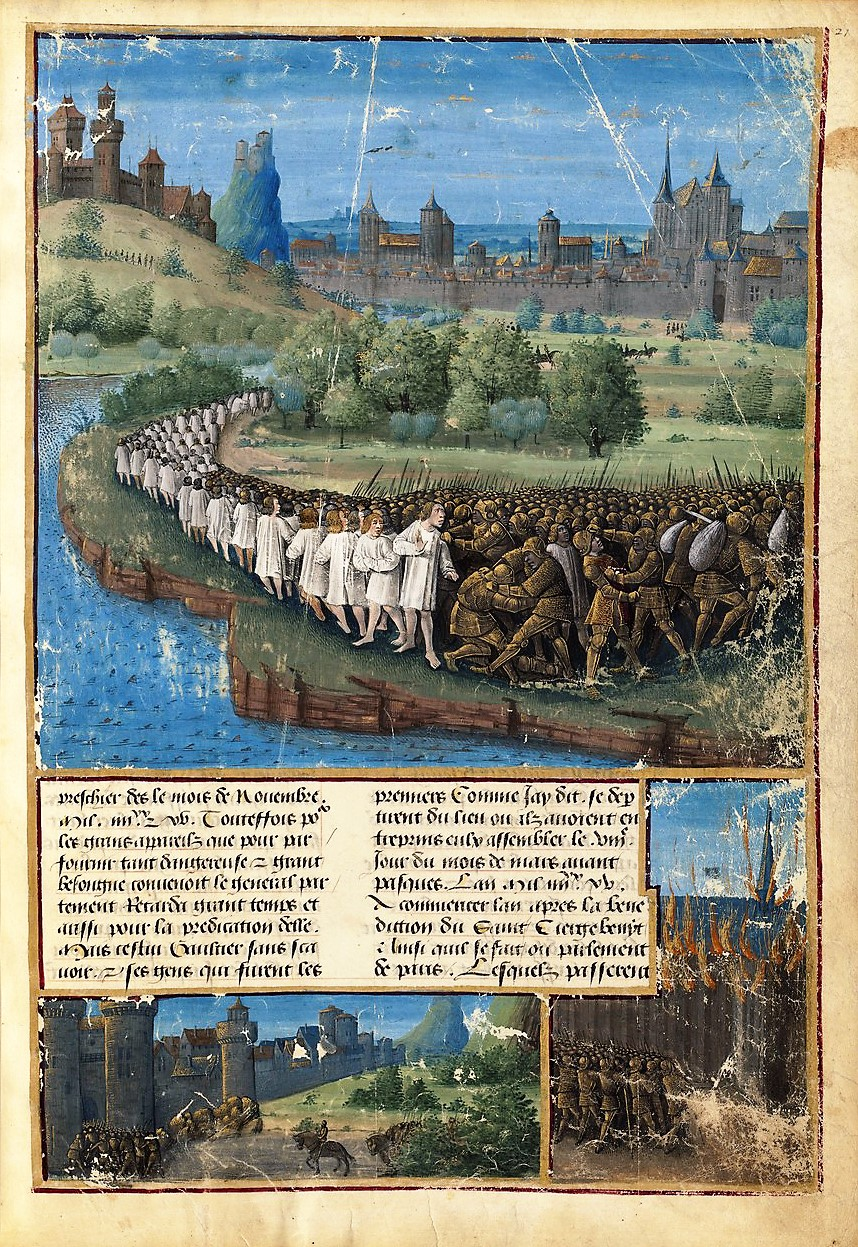
An illustration showing the defeat of the People's Crusade, from Sébastien Mamerot's Livre des Passages d'Outre-mer (Jean Colombe, c. 1472–75, BNF Fr. 5594)

The great French nobles and their trained armies of knights were not the first to undertake the journey towards Jerusalem. Urban had planned the departure of the first crusade for 15 August 1096, the Feast of the Assumption, but months before this, a number of unexpected armies of peasants and petty nobles set off for Jerusalem on their own, led by a charismatic priest called Peter the Hermit. Peter was the most successful of the preachers of Urban's message, and developed an almost hysterical enthusiasm among his followers, although he was probably not an "official" preacher sanctioned by Urban at Clermont. It is commonly believed that Peter's followers consisted entirely of a massive group of untrained and illiterate peasants who did not even know where Jerusalem was, but there were also many knights among the peasants, including Walter Sans Avoir, who was lieutenant to Peter and led a separate army.

Lacking military discipline, Peter's fledgling army quickly found itself in trouble despite the fact they were still in Christian territory. The army led by Walter plundered the Belgrade and Zemun areas, and arrived in Constantinople with little resistance. Meanwhile, the army led by Peter, which marched separately from Walter's army, also fought with the Hungarians and may have captured Belgrade. At Niš, the Byzantine governor tried to supply them, but Peter had little control over his followers and Byzantine troops were needed to quell their attacks. Peter arrived at Constantinople in August, where his army joined with the one led by Walter, which had already arrived, as well as separate bands of crusaders from France, Germany, and Italy. Another army of Bohemians and Saxons did not make it past Hungary before splitting up.

Peter's and Walter's unruly mob began to pillage outside the city in search of supplies and food, prompting Alexios to hurriedly ferry the gathering across the Bosporus one week later. After crossing into Asia Minor, the crusaders split up and began to pillage the countryside, wandering into Seljuk territory around Nicaea. The far more-experienced Turks massacred most of this group. Some Italian and German crusaders were defeated at the Siege of Xerigordon at the end of September. Meanwhile, Walter and Peter's followers, who, although for the most part untrained in battle but led by about 50 knights, fought the Turks at the Battle of Civetot in October 1096. The Turkish archers destroyed the crusader army, and Walter was among the dead. Peter, who was absent in Constantinople at the time, later joined the second wave of crusaders, along with the few survivors of Civetot.

At a local level, the preaching of the First Crusade ignited the Rhineland massacres perpetrated against Jews. At the end of 1095 and the beginning of 1096, months before the departure of the official crusade in August, there were attacks on Jewish communities in France and Germany. In May 1096, Emicho of Flonheim (sometimes incorrectly known as Emicho of Leiningen) attacked the Jews at Speyer and Worms. Other unofficial crusaders from Swabia, led by Hartmann of Dillingen, along with French, English, Lotharingian and Flemish volunteers, led by Drogo of Nesle and William the Carpenter, as well as many locals, joined Emicho in the destruction of the Jewish community of Mainz at the end of May. In Mainz, one Jewish woman killed her children rather than let the crusaders kill them. Chief rabbi Kalonymus Ben Meshullam committed suicide in anticipation of being killed. Emicho's company then went on to Cologne, and others continued on to Trier, Metz, and other cities. Peter the Hermit also may have been involved in violence against the Jews, and an army led by a priest named Folkmar attacked Jews further east in Bohemia.

Coloman of Hungary had to deal with the problems that the armies of the First Crusade caused during their march across his country towards the Holy Land in 1096. He crushed two crusader hordes that had been pillaging the kingdom. Emicho's army eventually continued into Hungary but was also defeated by Coloman, at which point, Emicho's followers dispersed. Some eventually joined the main armies, although Emicho himself went home. Many of the attackers seem to have wanted to force the Jews to convert, although they were also interested in acquiring money from them. Physical violence against Jews was never part of the church hierarchy's official policy for crusading, and the Christian bishops, especially the Archbishop of Cologne, did their best to protect the Jews. A decade before, the Bishop of Speyer had taken the step of providing the Jews of that city with a walled ghetto to protect them from Christian violence and given their chief rabbis the control of judicial matters in the quarter. Nevertheless, some also took money in return for their protection. The attacks may have originated in the belief that Jews and Muslims were equally enemies of Christ, and enemies were to be fought or converted to Christianity.

== From Clermont to Constantinople ==
=== Recruitment ===
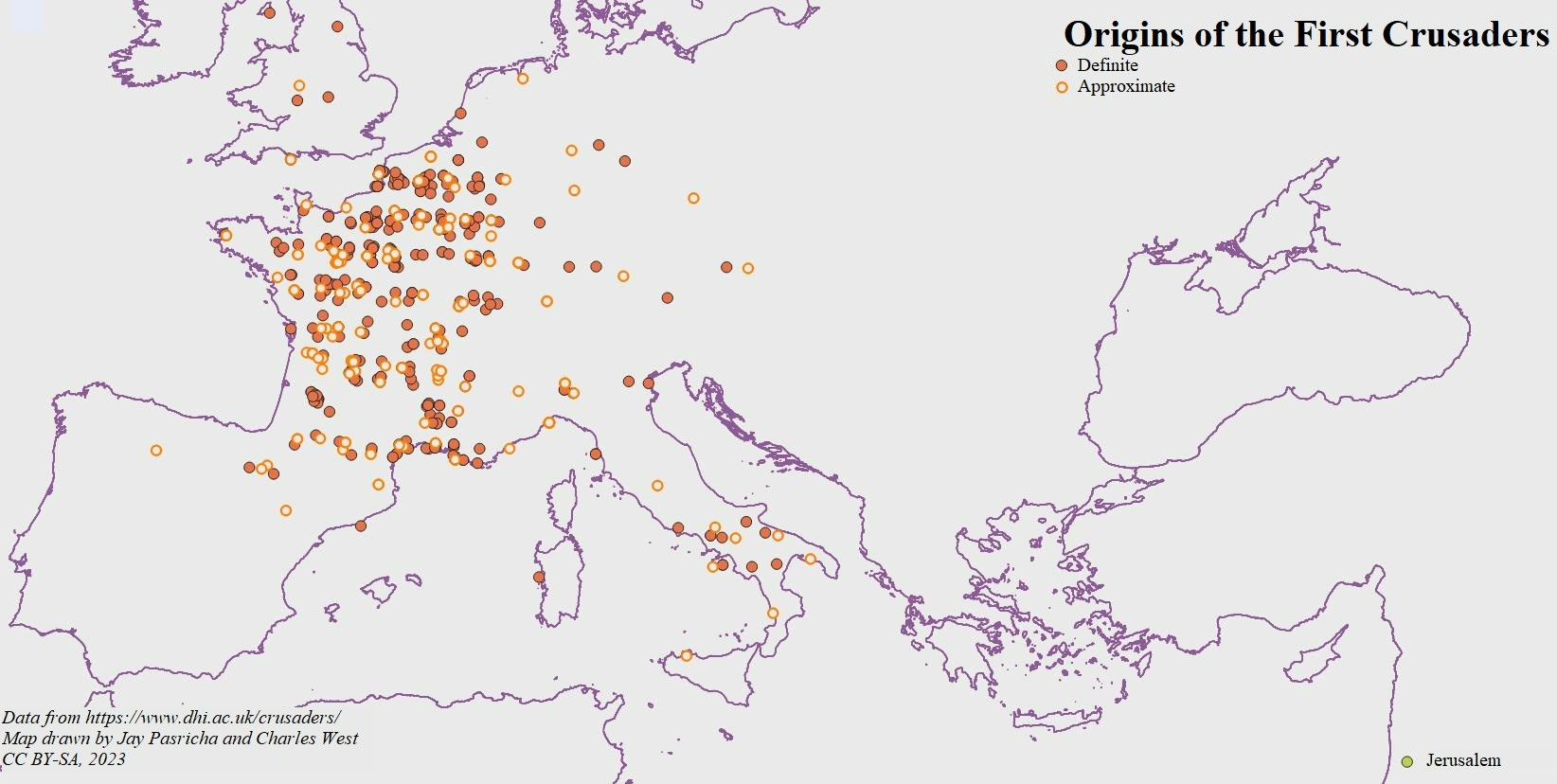
Origin of the known participants on the First Crusade

Recruitment for such a large enterprise was continent-wide. Estimates place the number who left Western Europe in the year after Clermont at 70,000 to 80,000, with more joining over the course of the three-year crusade. Estimates for the number of knights range from 7,000 to 10,000; 35,000 to 50,000 foot soldiers; and including non-combatants a total of 60,000 to 100,000. But Urban's speech had been well-planned. He had discussed the crusade with Adhemar of Le Puy and Raymond IV, Count of Toulouse, and instantly the expedition had the support of two of southern France's most important leaders. Adhemar himself was present at the council and was the first to "take the cross". During the rest of 1095 and into 1096, Urban spread the message throughout France, and urged his bishops and legates to preach in their own dioceses elsewhere in France, Germany, and Italy as well. However, it is clear that the response to the speech was much greater than even the Pope, let alone Alexios, expected. On his tour of France, Urban tried to forbid certain people (including women, monks, and the sick) from joining the crusade, but found this nearly impossible. In the end, most who took up the call were not knights, but peasants who were not wealthy and had little in the way of fighting skills, in an outpouring of a new emotional and personal piety that was not easily harnessed by the ecclesiastical and lay aristocracy. Typically, preaching would conclude with every volunteer taking a vow to complete a pilgrimage to the Church of the Holy Sepulchre; they were also given a cross, usually sewn onto their clothes.

It is difficult to assess the motives of the thousands of participants for whom there is no historical record, or even those of important knights, whose stories were usually retold by monks or clerics. It is quite likely that personal piety was a major factor for many crusaders. Even with this popular enthusiasm, Urban ensured that there would be an army of knights, drawn from the French aristocracy. Aside from Adhemar and Raymond, other leaders he recruited throughout 1096 included Bohemond of Taranto, a southern Italian ally of the reform popes; Bohemond's nephew Tancred; Godfrey of Bouillon, who had previously been an anti-reform ally of the Holy Roman Emperor; his brother Baldwin of Boulogne; Hugh I, Count of Vermandois, brother of the excommunicated Philip I of France; Robert Curthose, brother of William II of England; and his relatives Stephen II, Count of Blois, and Robert II, Count of Flanders. The crusaders represented northern and southern France, Flanders, Germany, and southern Italy, and so were divided into four separate armies that were not always cooperative, though they were held together by their common ultimate goal.

The crusade was led by some of the most powerful nobles of France, many of whom left everything behind, and it was often the case that entire families went on crusade at their own great expense. For example, Robert of Normandy loaned the Duchy of Normandy to his brother William II of England, and Godfrey sold or mortgaged his property to the church. Tancred was worried about the sinful nature of knightly warfare, and was excited to find a holy outlet for violence. Tancred and Bohemond, as well as Godfrey, Baldwin, and their older brother Eustace III, Count of Boulogne, are examples of families who crusaded together. Much of the enthusiasm for the crusade was based on family relations, as most of the French crusaders were distant relatives. Nevertheless, in at least some cases, personal advancement played a role in the Crusaders' motives. For instance, Bohemond was motivated by the desire to carve himself out a territory in the east, and had previously campaigned against the Byzantines to try to achieve this. The crusade gave him a further opportunity, which he took after the Siege of Antioch, taking possession of the city and establishing the Principality of Antioch.

=== The road to Constantinople ===
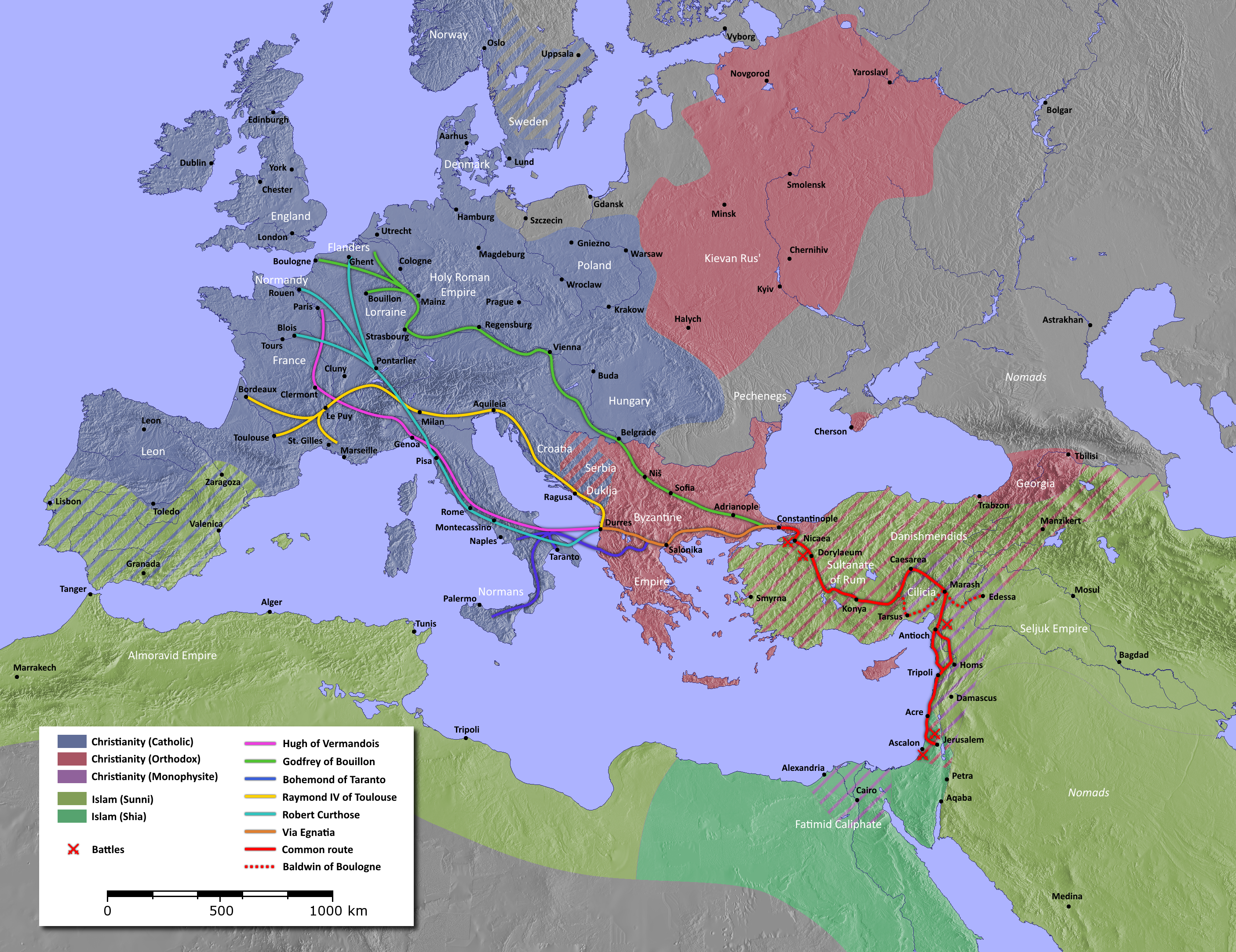
Major routes taken during the First Crusade

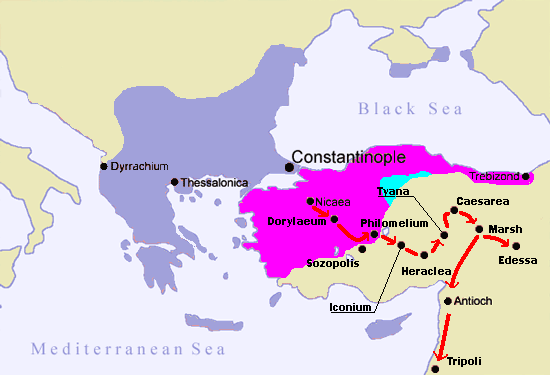
Route of the First Crusade through Asia

The four main crusader armies left Europe around the appointed time in August 1096. They took different routes to Constantinople, some through Eastern Europe and the Balkans, some crossing the Adriatic Sea. They gathered outside the Roman-era Walls of Constantinople between November 1096 and April 1097. Hugh of Vermandois arrived first, followed by Godfrey, Raymond, and Bohemond.

Godfrey took the land route through the Balkans, Coloman of Hungary allowed Godfrey and his troops to cross Hungary only after his brother Baldwin was offered as a hostage to guarantee his troops' good conduct. Raymond of Toulouse led the Provençals down the inland and coast of Sclavonia or Dalmatia which is the Kingdom of Croatia. There they encountered a hostile population (in anarchy after death of Croatian king Demetrius Zvonimir), passing through Constantine Bodin's kingdom of Duklja and into Durrës, and then due east to Constantinople. Bohemond and Tancred led their Normans by sea to Durrës, and thence by land to Constantinople.

The armies arrived in Constantinople with little food and expected provisions and help from Alexios. Alexios was understandably suspicious after his experiences with the People's Crusade, and also because the knights included his old Norman enemy, Bohemond, who had invaded Byzantine territory on numerous occasions with his father and may have even attempted to organise an attack on Constantinople while encamped outside the city. This time, Alexios was more prepared for the crusaders and there were fewer incidents of violence along the way.

The crusaders may have expected Alexios to become their leader, but he had no interest in joining them, and was mainly concerned with transporting them into Asia Minor as quickly as possible. In return for food and supplies, Alexios requested the leaders to swear fealty to him and promise to return to the Byzantine Empire any land recovered from the Turks. Godfrey was the first to take the oath, and almost all the other leaders followed him, although they did so only after warfare had almost broken out in the city between the citizens and the crusaders, who were eager to pillage for supplies. Raymond alone avoided swearing the oath, instead pledging that he would simply cause no harm to the empire. Before ensuring that the various armies were shuttled across the Bosporus, Alexios advised the leaders on how best to deal with the Seljuk armies that they would soon encounter.

== Siege of Nicaea ==
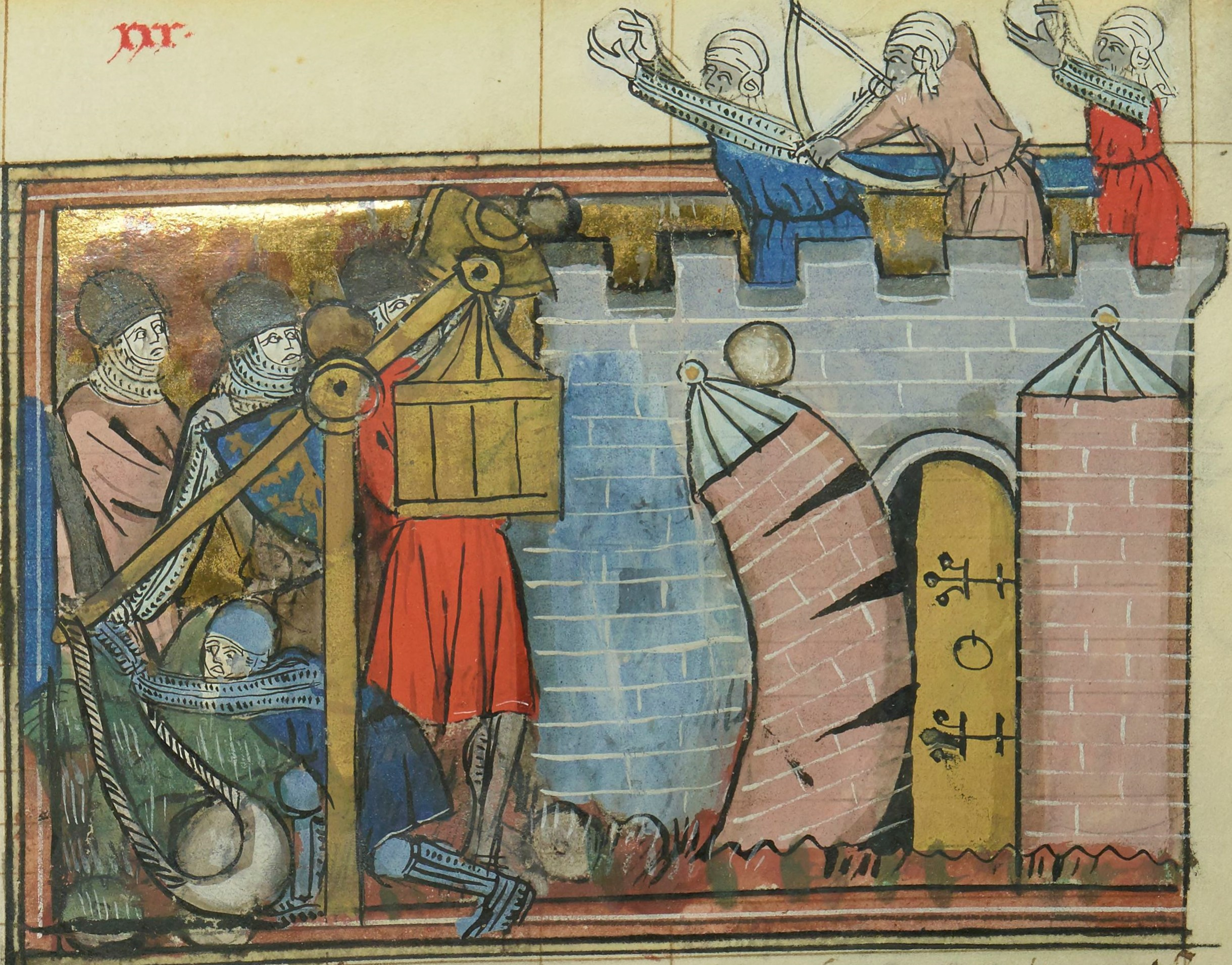
Siege of Nicaea (1097). Miniature from Roman de Godefroy de Bouillon et de Saladin

The Crusader armies crossed over into Asia Minor during the first half of 1097, where they were joined by Peter the Hermit and the remainder of his relatively small army. In addition, Alexios also sent two of his generals, Manuel Boutoumites and Tatikios, to assist the crusaders. The first objective of their campaign was Nicaea, a city once under Byzantine rule, but which had become the capital of the Seljuk Sultanate of Rûm under Kilij Arslan. Arslan was away campaigning against the Danishmends in central Anatolia at the time, and had left behind his treasury and his family, underestimating the strength of these new crusaders.

Upon the Crusaders' arrival on 14 May 1097, the city was subjected to siege, and when Arslan had word of it he rushed back to Nicaea and attacked the crusader army on 16 May. He was driven back by the unexpectedly large crusader force, with heavy losses being suffered on both sides in the ensuing battle. The siege continued, but the crusaders had little success as they found they could not blockade Lake İznik, which the city was situated on, and from which it could be provisioned. To break the city, Alexios had the Crusaders' ships rolled over land on logs, and at the sight of them, the Turkish garrison finally surrendered on 18 June.

There was some discontent amongst the Franks who were forbidden from looting the city. This was ameliorated by Alexius financially rewarding the crusaders. Later chronicles exaggerate tension between the Greeks and Franks but Stephen of Blois, in a letter to his wife Adela of Blois confirms goodwill and cooperation continued at this point. The fall of Nicaea is viewed as a rare product of close cooperation between the Crusaders and the Byzantines.

== Battle of Dorylaeum ==
At the end of June, the crusaders marched on through Anatolia. They were accompanied by some Byzantine troops under Tatikios, and still harboured the hope that Alexios would send a full Byzantine army after them. They also divided the army into two more-easily managed groups—one contingent led by the Normans, the other by the French. The two groups intended to meet again at Dorylaeum, but on 1 July the Normans, who had marched ahead of the French, were attacked by Kilij Arslan. Arslan had gathered a much larger army than he previously had after his defeat at Nicaea, and now surrounded the Normans with his fast-moving mounted archers. The Normans "deployed in a tight-knit defensive formation", surrounding all their equipment and the non-combatants who had followed them along the journey, and sent for help from the other group. When the French arrived, Godfrey broke through the Turkish lines and the legate Adhemar outflanked the Turks from the rear. The Turks, who had expected to destroy the Normans and did not anticipate the quick arrival of the French, fled rather than face the combined crusader army.

The crusaders' march through Anatolia was thereafter unopposed, but the journey was unpleasant, as Arslan had burned and destroyed everything he left behind in his army's flight. It was the middle of summer, and the crusaders had very little food and water; many men and horses died. Fellow Christians sometimes gave them gifts of food and money, but more often than not, the crusaders simply looted and pillaged whenever the opportunity presented itself. Individual leaders continued to dispute the overall leadership, although none of them were powerful enough to take command on their own, as Adhemar was always recognised as the spiritual leader.

== The Armenian interlude ==
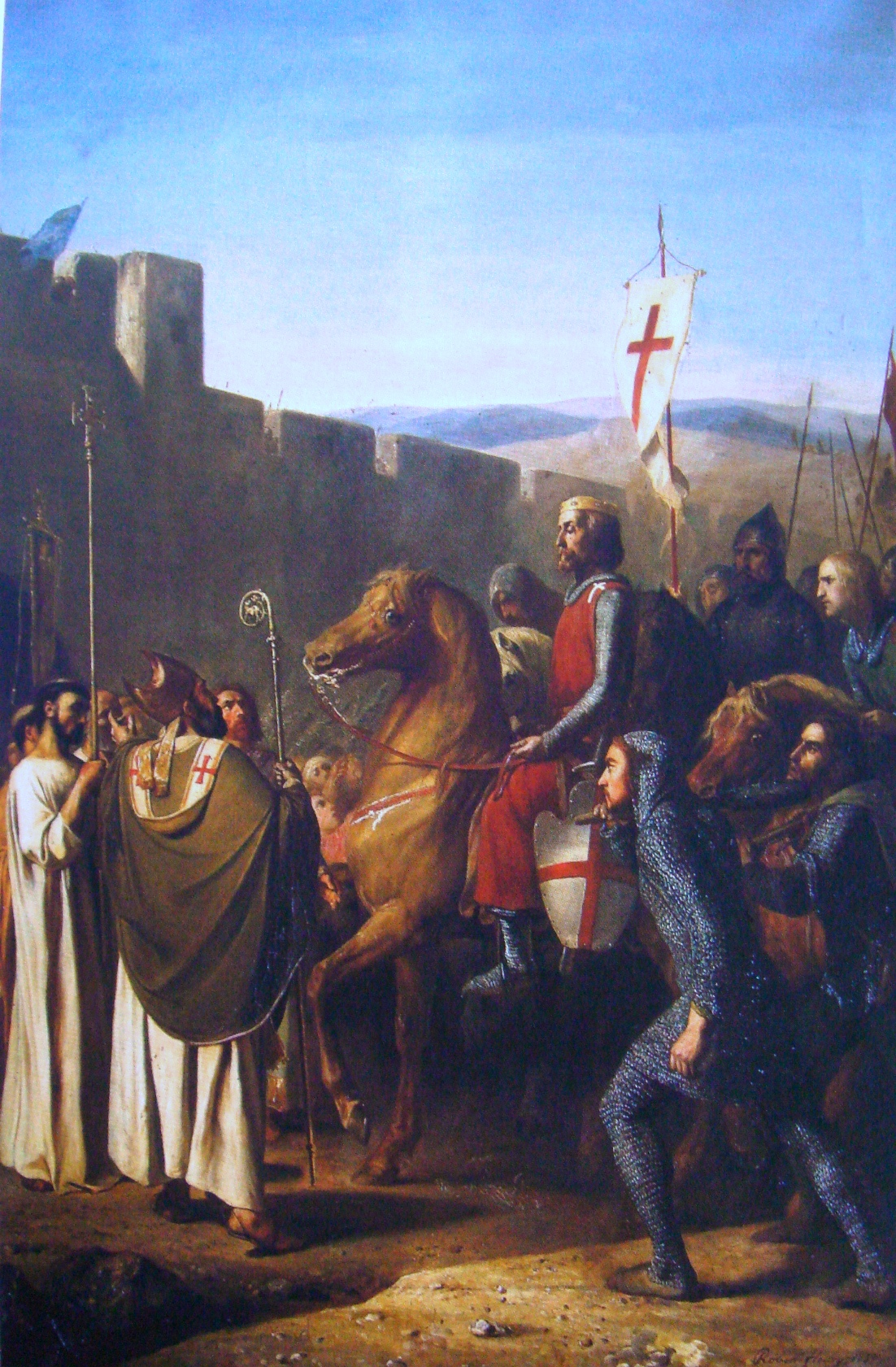
Baldwin of Boulogne entering Edessa in 1098 (history painting by Joseph-Nicolas Robert-Fleury, 1840)

After passing through the Cilician Gates, Baldwin and Tancred broke away from the main body of the army and set off towards the Armenian lands. Baldwin desired to create a fiefdom for himself in the Holy Land, and, in Armenia, he could count on the support of the locals, especially an adventurer named Bagrat. Baldwin and Tancred led two separate contingents, departing Heraclea on 15 September. Tancred arrived first at Tarsus where he persuaded the Seljuk garrison to raise his flag on the citadel. Baldwin reached Tarsus the next day and, in a reversal, the Turks allowed Baldwin to take possession of two towers. Heavily outnumbered, Tancred decided not to fight for the town. Shortly thereafter, a group of Norman knights arrived, but Baldwin denied entry to them. The Turks slaughtered the Normans during the night, and Baldwin's men blamed him for their fate and massacred the remaining Seljuk garrison. Baldwin took shelter in a tower and convinced his soldiers of his innocence. A pirate captain, Guynemer of Boulogne, sailed up the Berdan River to Tarsus and swore fealty to Baldwin, who hired Guynemer's men to garrison the city while he continued his campaign.

Tancred had meanwhile seized the town of Mamistra. Baldwin reached the town on around 30 September. The Norman Richard of Salerno wanted to take revenge for Tarsus, causing a skirmish between the soldiers of Baldwin and Tancred. Baldwin left Mamistra and joined the main army at Marash, but Bagrat persuaded him to launch a campaign across a region densely populated by Armenians and he left the main army on 17 October. The Armenians welcomed Baldwin, and the local population massacred the Seljuks, seizing the fortresses Ravendel and Turbessel before the end of 1097. Baldwin made Bagrat the governor of Ravendel.

The Armenian lord Thoros of Edessa sent envoys to Baldwin in early 1098, seeking his assistance against the nearby Seljuks. Before departing for Edessa, Baldwin ordered the arrest of Bagrat, accused of collaboration with the Seljuks. Bagrat was tortured and forced to surrender Ravendel. Baldwin left for Edessa in early February, being harassed en route by the forces of Balduk, emir of Samosata. Reaching the city, he was well-received by both Thoros and the local Christian population. Remarkably, Thoros adopted Baldwin as a son, making him co-regent of Edessa. Strengthened by troops from Edessa, Baldwin raided Balduk's territory and placed a garrison in a small fortress near Samosata.

Shortly after Baldwin's return from the campaign, a group of local nobles began plotting against Thoros, likely with Baldwin's consent. A riot broke out in the town, forcing Thoros to take refuge in the citadel. Baldwin pledged to save his adoptive father, but when the rioters broke into the citadel on 9 March and murdered both Thoros and his wife, he did nothing to stop them. On the following day, after the townspeople acknowledged Baldwin as their ruler, he assumed the title of Count of Edessa, and so established the first of the Crusader states.

While the Byzantines had lost Edessa to the Seljuks in 1087, the emperor did not demand that Baldwin hand over the town. Moreover, the acquisition of Ravendel, Turbessel and Edessa strengthened the position of the main crusader army later at Antioch. The lands along the Euphrates secured a supply of food for the crusaders, and the fortresses hindered the movement of the Seljuk troops.

As his force was small, Baldwin had used diplomacy to secure his rule in Edessa. He married Arda of Armenia, who later became queen consort of the Kingdom of Jerusalem, and encouraged his retainers to marry local women. The city's rich treasury enabled him to employ mercenaries and to buy Samosata from Balduk. The resultant treaty for the transfer of Samosata was the first friendly arrangement between a crusader leader and a Muslim ruler, who remained governor of the city.

An important figure in the kingdom in the 12th century was Belek Ghazi, grandson of the former Seljuk governor of Jerusalem, Artuk. Belek was to play a small role in this story who, as an Artuqid emir, had hired Baldwin to suppress a revolt in Saruj. When the Muslim leaders of the town approached Balduk to come to their rescue, Balduk hurried to Saruj, but it soon became apparent that his forces were not able to resist a siege and the defenders yielded to Baldwin. Baldwin demanded Balduk's wife and children as hostages, and upon his refusal, Baldwin had him captured and executed. With Saruj, Baldwin now had consolidated the county and ensured his communications with the main body of Crusaders. Kerbogha, ever on guard to defeat the Crusaders, gathered a large army to eliminate Baldwin. During his march towards Antioch, Kerbogha besieged the walls of Edessa for three weeks in May, but could not capture it. This delay played a crucial part in the Crusader victory at Antioch.

== Siege of Antioch ==
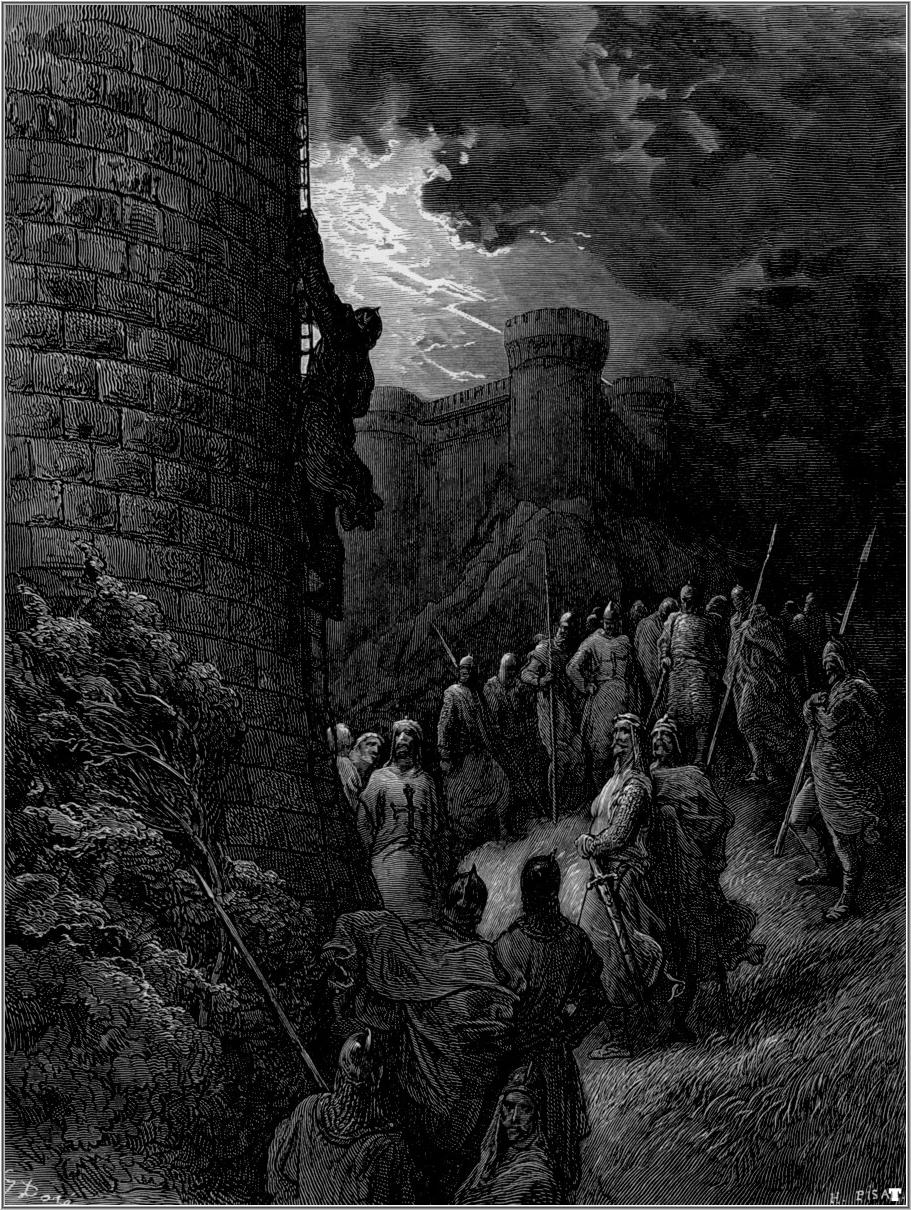
Bohemond of Taranto Alone Mounts the Rampart of Antioch, by Gustave Doré (1871)

The crusader army, without Baldwin and Tancred, had marched on to Antioch, situated midway between Constantinople and Jerusalem. Described in a letter by Stephen of Blois as "a city very extensive, fortified with incredible strength and almost impregnable", the idea of taking the city by assault was a discouraging one to the crusaders. Hoping rather to force a capitulation, or find a traitor inside the city—a tactic that had previously seen Antioch change to the control of the Byzantines and then the Seljuk Turks—the crusader army began a siege on 20 October 1097. Antioch was so large that the crusaders did not have enough troops to fully surround it, and as a result it was able to stay partially supplied. The subsequent Siege of Antioch has been called the "most interesting siege in history."

By January the attritional eight-month siege led to hundreds, or possibly thousands, of crusaders dying of starvation. Adhemar believed this to have been caused by their sinful nature, and rituals of fasting, prayer, alms-giving and procession were undertaken. Women were expelled from the camp. Many deserted, including Stephen of Blois. Foraging systems eased the situation, as did supplies from Cicilia and Edessa, through the recently captured ports of Latakia and St Symeon. In March a small English fleet arrived with supplies. The Franks benefited from disunity in the Muslim world and the possibility that they mistakenly believed the crusaders to be Byzantine mercenaries. The Seljuk brothers, Duqaq of Syria and Ridwan of Aleppo, dispatched separate relief armies in December and February that, had they been combined, would probably have been victorious.

After these failures, Kerbogha raised a coalition from southern Syria, northern Iraq and Anatolia with the ambition of extending his power from Syria to the Mediterranean. His coalition first spent three weeks attempting to recapture Saruj, a decisive delay.

Bohemond persuaded the other leaders that, if Antioch fell, he would keep it for himself and that an Armenian commander of a section of the city's walls had agreed to allow the crusaders to enter.

Stephen of Blois had deserted, and his message to Alexios that the cause was lost persuaded the Emperor to halt his advance through Anatolia at Philomelium before returning to Constantinople. (Alexios' failure to reach the siege would be used by Bohemond to rationalise his refusal to return the city to the Empire as promised.)

The Armenian Firouz helped Bohemond and a small party enter the city on 2 June and open a gate, at which point horns were sounded, the city's Christian majority opened the other gates and the crusaders entered. In the sack, they killed most of the Muslim inhabitants and many Christian Greeks, Syrians and Armenians in the confusion.

On 4 June the vanguard of Kerbogha's 40,000-strong army arrived surrounding the Franks. From 10 June for 4 days waves of Kerbogha's men assailed the city walls from dawn until dusk. Bohemond and Adhemar barred the city gates to prevent mass desertions and managed to hold out. Kerbogha then changed tactics to try to starve the crusaders out. Morale inside the city was low and defeat looked imminent but a peasant visionary called Peter Bartholomew claimed the apostle St. Andrew came to him to show the location of the Holy Lance that had pierced Christ on the cross. This supposedly encouraged the crusaders but the accounts are misleading as it was two weeks before the final battle for the city. On 24 June the Franks sought terms for surrender that were refused. On 28 June 1098 at dawn, the Franks marched out of the city in four battle groups to engage the enemy. Kerbogha allowed them to deploy with the aim of destroying them in the open. However, the discipline of the Muslim army did not hold and a disorderly attack was launched. Unable to overrun a bedraggled force they outnumbered two-to-one, Muslims attacking the Bridge Gate fled through the advancing main body of the Muslim army. With very few casualties the Muslim army broke and fled the battle.

Stephen of Blois was in Alexandretta when he learned of the situation in Antioch. It seemed like their situation was hopeless so he left the Middle East, warning Alexios and his army on his way back to France. Because of what looked like a massive betrayal, the leaders at Antioch, most notably Bohemond, argued that Alexios had deserted the Crusade and thus invalidated all of their oaths to him. While Bohemond asserted his claim to Antioch, not everyone agreed (most notably Raymond of Toulouse), so the crusade was delayed for the rest of the year while the nobles argued amongst themselves. When discussing this period, a common historiographical viewpoint advanced by some scholars is that the Franks of northern France, the Provençals of southern France, (Note: At that time the terms "Provençal" or "Provence" were not limited to the present-day region of Provence, but encompassed the regions of southern France that spoke the Occitan language. They were then equivalent to the terms "Occitan" or "Occitania" which appeared later.) and the Normans of southern Italy considered themselves separate nations, creating turmoil as each tried to increase its individual status. Others argue that while this may have had something to do with the disputes, personal ambition among the Crusader leaders might be just as easily blamed.

Meanwhile, a plague broke out, killing many in the army, including the legate Adhemar, who died on 1 August. There were now even fewer horses than before, and worse, the Muslim peasants in the area refused to supply the crusaders with food. Thus, in December, following the Siege of Ma'arrat al-Numan, some historians described the first occurrence of cannibalism among the crusaders, even though this account does not appear in any contemporary Muslim chronicle. At the same time, the minor knights and soldiers had become increasingly restless and threatened to continue to Jerusalem without their squabbling leaders. Finally, at the beginning of 1099, the march restarted, leaving Bohemond behind as the first Prince of Antioch.

== From Antioch to Jerusalem ==
Proceeding down the Mediterranean coast, the crusaders encountered little resistance, as local rulers preferred to make peace with them and furnish them with supplies rather than fight. Their forces were evolving, with Robert Curthose and Tancred agreeing to become vassals of Raymond IV of Toulouse, who was wealthy enough to compensate them for their service. Godfrey of Bouillon, now supported by his brother's territories in Edessa, refused to do the same. In January, Raymond dismantled the walls of Ma'arrat al-Numan and he began the march south to Jerusalem, barefoot and dressed as a pilgrim, followed by Robert and Tancred and their respective armies.

Raymond planned to take Tripoli to set up a state equivalent to Antioch, but first initiated a siege of Arqa, a city in northern Lebanon, on 14 February 1099. Meanwhile, Godfrey, along with Robert II of Flanders, who had also refused vassalage to Raymond, joined with the remaining Crusaders at Latakia and marched south in February. Bohemond had originally marched out with them but quickly returned to Antioch in order to consolidate his rule against the advancing Byzantines. Tancred left Raymond's service and joined with Godfrey. A separate force linked to Godfrey's was led by Gaston IV of Béarn.

Godfrey, Robert, Tancred, and Gaston arrived at Arqa in March, but the siege continued. Pons of Balazun died, struck by a stone missile. The situation was tense not only among the military leaders, but also among the clergy. Since Adhemar's death there had been no real leader of the crusade, and ever since the discovery of the Holy Lance, there had been accusations of fraud among the clerical factions. On 8 April, Arnulf of Chocques challenged Peter Bartholomew to an ordeal by fire. Peter underwent the ordeal and died after days of agony from his wounds, which discredited the Holy Lance as a fake. This also undermined Raymond's authority over the Crusade, as he was the main proponent of its authenticity.

The siege of Arqa lasted until 13 May, when the Crusaders left having captured nothing. The Fatimids had recaptured Jerusalem from the Seljuks the year before and attempted to make a deal with the Crusaders, promising freedom of passage to any pilgrims to the Holy Land on the condition that the Crusaders not advance into their domains, but this was rejected. The Fatimid Iftikhar al-Dawla was governor of Jerusalem and well aware of the Crusaders' intentions. Therefore, he expelled all of Jerusalem's Christian inhabitants. He also poisoned most of the wells in the area. On 13 May, the Crusaders came to Tripoli, where the emir Jalal al-Mulk Abu'l Hasan provided the Crusader army with horses and vowed to convert to Christianity if the Crusaders defeated the Fatimids. Continuing south along the coast, the Crusaders passed Beirut on 19 May and Tyre on 23 May. Turning inland at Jaffa, on 3 June they reached Ramla, which had been abandoned by its inhabitants. The bishopric of Ramla-Lydda was established there at the Church of St. George before they continued to Jerusalem. On 6 June, Godfrey sent Tancred and Gaston to capture Bethlehem, where Tancred flew his banner over the Church of the Nativity. On 7 June, the Crusaders reached Jerusalem. Many Crusaders wept upon seeing the city they had journeyed so long to reach.

== Siege of Jerusalem ==
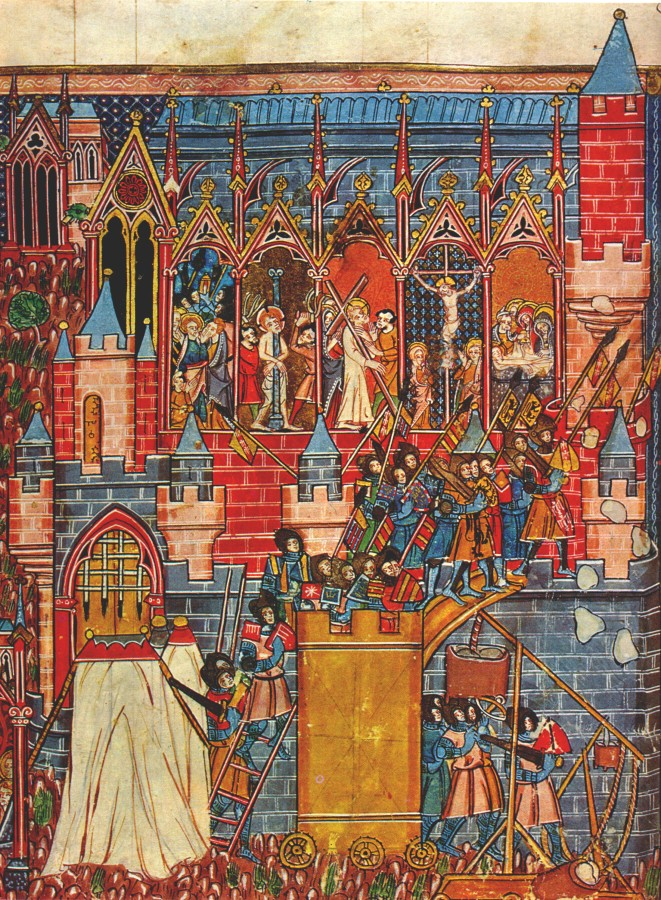
The Siege of Jerusalem as depicted in a medieval manuscript

The Crusaders' arrival at Jerusalem revealed an arid countryside, lacking in water or food supplies. Here there was no prospect of relief, even as they feared an imminent attack by the local Fatimid rulers. There was no hope of trying to blockade the city as they had at Antioch; the crusaders had insufficient troops, supplies, and time. Rather, they resolved to take the city by assault. They might have been left with little choice, as by the time the Crusader army reached Jerusalem, it has been estimated that only about 12,000 men including 1,500 cavalry remained. Thus began the decisive Siege of Jerusalem. These contingents, composed of men with differing origins and varying allegiances, were also approaching another low ebb in their camaraderie. While Godfrey and Tancred made camp to the north of the city, Raymond made his to the south. In addition, the Provençal contingent did not take part in the initial assault on 13 June 1099. This first assault was perhaps more speculative than determined, and after scaling the outer wall the Crusaders were repulsed from the inner one.

After the failure of the initial assault, a meeting between the various leaders was organised in which it was agreed that a more concerted attack would be required in the future. On 17 June, a party of Genoese mariners under Guglielmo Embriaco arrived at Jaffa and provided the Crusaders with skilled engineers, and perhaps more critically, supplies of timber (stripped from the ships) to build siege engines. The Crusaders' morale was raised when the priest Peter Desiderius claimed to have had a divine vision of Adhemar of Le Puy, instructing them to fast and then march in a barefoot procession around the city walls, after which the city would fall, following the Biblical story of the battle of Jericho. After a three-day fast, on 8 July the Crusaders performed the procession as they had been instructed by Desiderius, ending on the Mount of Olives where Peter the Hermit preached to them, and shortly afterwards the various bickering factions arrived at a public rapprochement. News arrived shortly after that a Fatimid relief army had set off from Egypt, giving the Crusaders a very strong incentive to make another assault on the city.

The final assault on Jerusalem began on 13 July. Raymond's troops attacked the south gate while the other contingents attacked the northern wall. Initially, the Provençals at the southern gate made little headway, but the contingents at the northern wall fared better, with a slow but steady attrition of the defence. On 15 July, a final push was launched at both ends of the city, and eventually, the inner rampart of the northern wall was captured. In the ensuing panic, the defenders abandoned the walls of the city at both ends, allowing the Crusaders to finally enter.

=== Massacre ===
The massacre that followed the capture of Jerusalem has attained particular notoriety, as a "juxtaposition of extreme violence and anguished faith". The eyewitness accounts from the crusaders themselves leave little doubt that there was great slaughter in the aftermath of the siege. Nevertheless, some historians propose that the scale of the massacre has been exaggerated in later medieval sources.

After the successful assault on the northern wall, the defenders fled to the Temple Mount, pursued by Tancred and his men. Arriving before the defenders could secure the area, Tancred's men assaulted the precinct, butchering many of the defenders, with the remainder taking refuge in the Al-Aqsa Mosque. Tancred then called a halt to the slaughter, offering those in the mosque his protection. When the defenders on the southern wall heard of the fall of the northern wall, they fled to the citadel, allowing Raymond and the Provençals to enter the city. Iftikhar al-Dawla, the commander of the garrison, struck a deal with Raymond, surrendering the citadel in return for being granted safe passage to Ascalon.

The slaughter continued for the rest of the day; Muslims were indiscriminately killed, and Jews who had taken refuge in their synagogue died when it was burnt down by the Crusaders. The following day, Tancred's prisoners in the mosque were slaughtered. Nevertheless, it is clear that some Muslims and Jews of the city survived the massacre, either escaping or being taken prisoner to be ransomed. The Letter of the Karaite elders of Ascalon provides details of Ascalon Jews making great efforts to ransom such Jewish captives and send them to safety in Alexandria. The Eastern Christian population of the city had been expelled before the siege by the governor, and thus escaped the massacre.

== Establishment of the Kingdom of Jerusalem ==
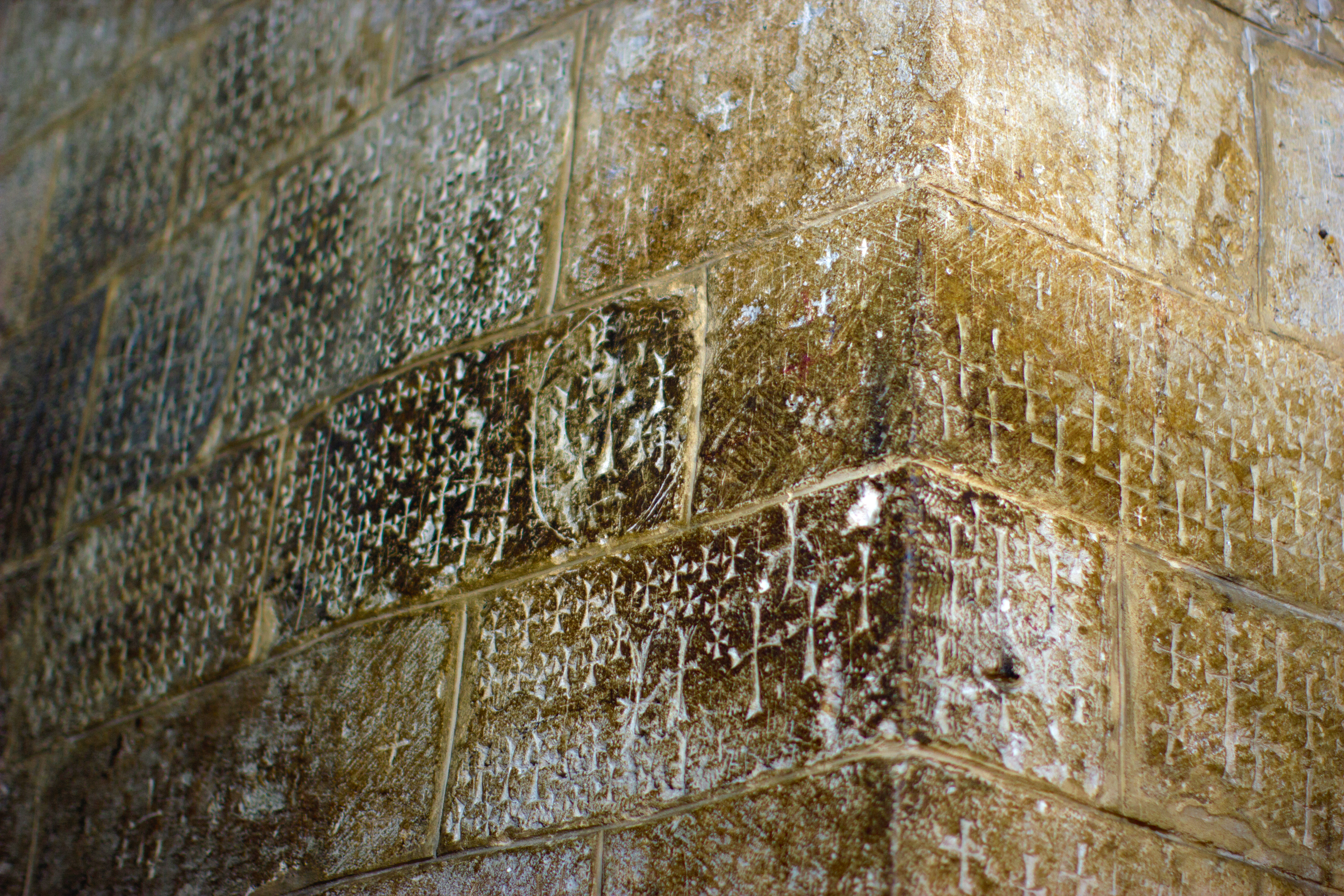
Crusader graffiti in the Church of the Holy Sepulchre, Jerusalem

On 22 July 1099, a council was held in the Church of the Holy Sepulchre to establish governance for Jerusalem. The death of the Greek Patriarch, Simeon II of Jerusalem who had been in exile in Cyprus, meant there was no obvious ecclesiastical candidate to establish a religious lordship, as a body of opinion maintained. Although Raymond of Toulouse could claim to be the pre-eminent crusade leader from 1098 his support had waned since his failed attempts to besiege Arqa and create his own realm. This may have been why he piously refused the crown on the grounds that it could only be worn by Christ. It may also have been an attempt to persuade others to reject the title, but Godfrey was already familiar with such a position. Probably more persuasive was the presence of the large army from Lorraine, led by him and his brothers, Eustace and Baldwin, vassals of the Ardennes–Bouillion dynasty. Godfrey was then elected leader, accepting the title Advocatus Sancti Sepulchri or Defender of the Holy Sepulchre. Raymond, incensed at this development, attempted to seize the Tower of David before leaving the city.

Urban II died on 29 July 1099, fourteen days after the capture of Jerusalem by the Crusaders, but before news of the event had reached Rome. He was succeeded by Pope Paschal II, who would serve almost 20 years. Although the Kingdom of Jerusalem survived until 1291, the city itself was captured by Saladin in 1187 following the decisive Battle of Hattin. Jerusalem then remained under Muslim rule for about 40 years, before being restored to Christian control during the Sixth Crusade in 1229. The city ultimately fell again to Muslim forces in 1244.

== Battle of Ascalon ==
In August 1099, Fatimid vizier al-Afdal Shahanshah landed a force of 20,000 North Africans at Ascalon. Geoffrey and Raymond marched out to meet this force on 9 August at the Battle of Ascalon with a force of only 1,200 knights and 9,000 foot soldiers. Outnumbered two to one, the Franks launched a surprise dawn attack and routed the overconfident and unprepared Muslim force. The opportunity was wasted though, as squabbling between Raymond and Godfrey prevented an attempt by the city's garrison to surrender to the more trusted Raymond. The crusaders had won a decisive victory, but the city remained in Muslim hands and a military threat to the nascent kingdom.

== Aftermath and legacy ==
The Crusader states between the First and Second Crusades

The majority of crusaders now considered their pilgrimage complete and returned home. Only 300 knights and 2,000 infantry remained to defend Palestine. It was the support of the knights from Lorraine that enabled Godfrey to take leadership of Jerusalem, over the claims of Raymond. When he died a year later these same Lorrainers thwarted the papal legate Dagobert of Pisa and his plans to make Jerusalem a theocracy and instead made Baldwin the first Latin king of Jerusalem. Bohemond returned to Europe to fight the Byzantines from Italy but he was defeated in 1108 at Dyrrhachium. After Raymond's death, his heirs captured Tripoli in 1109 with Genoese support. Relations between the newly created Crusader states of the County of Edessa and Principality of Antioch were variable. They fought together in the crusader defeat at the Battle of Harran in 1104, but the Antiocheans claimed suzerainty and blocked the return of Baldwin II of Jerusalem after his capture at the battle. The Franks became fully engaged in Near East politics with the result that Muslims and Christians often fought each other. Antioch's territorial expansion ended in 1119 with a major defeat to the Turks at the Battle of Ager Sanguinis, the Field of Blood.

A map of western Anatolia showing the routes taken by Christian armies during the Crusade of 1101

There were many who had gone home before reaching Jerusalem, and many who had never left Europe at all. When the success of the Crusade became known, these people were mocked and scorned by their families and threatened with excommunication by the pope. Back at home in Western Europe, those who had survived to reach Jerusalem were treated as heroes. Robert II of Flanders was nicknamed Hierosolymitanus thanks to his exploits. Among the participants in the later Crusade of 1101 were Stephen of Blois and Hugh of Vermandois, both of whom had returned home before reaching Jerusalem. This crusader force was almost annihilated in Asia Minor by the Seljuks, but the survivors helped to reinforce the kingdom upon their arrival in Jerusalem.

There is limited written evidence of the Islamic reaction dating from before 1160, but what there is indicates the crusade was barely noticed. This may be the result of a cultural misunderstanding in that the Turks and Arabs did not recognise the crusaders as religiously motivated warriors seeking conquest and settlement, assuming that the crusaders were just the latest in a long line of Byzantine mercenaries. Also, the Islamic world remained divided among rival rulers in Cairo, Damascus, Aleppo, and Baghdad. There was no pan-Islamic counter-attack, giving the crusaders the opportunity to consolidate. In the 1110s, the Seljuk sultan Muhammad I Tapar ordered a series of major counterattacks led by commanders such as Mawdud, Aqsunqur al-Bursuqi, Bursuq II, and Ilghazi, but all failed. Sustained Muslim success came only later under Imad al-Din Zengi, whose campaigns began the gradual erosion of the Crusader states, which accelerated under Saladin. After losing land throughout the latter part of the 13th century, and having been without a power base since the Siege of Acre in 1291, the Crusader states finally collapsed in 1302.

== Historiography ==
Latin Christendom was amazed by the success of the First Crusade for which the only credible explanation was divine providence. If the crusade had failed it is likely that the paradigm of crusading would have been abandoned. Instead, this form of religious warfare was popular for centuries and the crusade itself became one of the most written-about historic events of the medieval period. Critical analyses of histories of the Crusades can be found in studies by Jonathan Riley-Smith and Christopher Tyerman.

=== Original sources ===
The 19th-century French work Recueil des historiens des croisades (RHC) documents the original narrative sources of the First Crusade from Latin, Arabic, Greek, Armenian and Syriac authors. The documents are presented in their original language with French translations. The work is built on the 17th-century work Gesta Dei per Francos, compiled by Jacques Bongars. Several Hebrew sources on the First Crusade also exist. A complete bibliography can be found in The Routledge Companion to the Crusades. See also Crusade Texts in Translation and Selected Sources: The Crusades, in Fordham University's Internet Medieval Sourcebook.

Gesta Francorum – Liber VI (Battle outside Antioch) in Latin with English subtitles

The Latin narrative sources for the First Crusade are: (1) the anonymous Gesta Francorum; (2) Peter Tudebode's Historia de Hierosolymitano itinere; (3) the Monte Cassino chronicle Historia belli sacri; (4) Historia Francorum qui ceperunt Iherusalem by Raymond of Aguilers; (5) Gesta Francorum Iherusalem Perefrinantium by Fulcher of Chartres; (6) Albert of Aachen's Historia Hierosolymitanae expeditionis; (7) Ekkehard of Aura's Hierosolymita; (8) Robert the Monk's Historia Hierosolymitana; (9) Baldric of Dol's Historiae Hierosolymitanae libri IV; (10) Radulph of Caen's Gesta Tancredi in expeditione Hierosolymitana; and (11) Dei gesta per Francos by Guibert of Nogent. These include multiple first-hand accounts of the Council of Clermont and the crusade itself. American historian August Krey has created a narrative The First Crusade: The Accounts of Eyewitnesses and Participants, verbatim from the various chronologies and letters which offers considerable insight into the endeavour.

Important related works include the Greek perspective offered in the Alexiad by Byzantine princess Anna Komnene, daughter of the emperor. The view of the Crusades from the Islamic perspective is found in two major sources. The first, The Chronicle of Damascus, is by Arab historian Ibn al-Qalanisi. The second is The Complete History by the Arab (or Kurdish) historian Ali ibn al-Athir. Minor but important works from the Armenian and Syriac are Matthew of Edessa's Chronicle and the Chronicle of Michael the Syrian. The three Hebrew chronicles include the Solomon bar Simson Chronicle discussing the Rhineland massacres. A complete description of sources of the First Crusade is found in Claude Cahen's La Syrie du nord à l'époque des croisades et la principauté franque d'Antioche.

The anonymous authors of the Gesta, Fulcher of Chartres and Raymond of Aguilers were all participants in the Crusade, accompanied different contingents, and their works are regarded as foundational. Fulcher and Raymond both utilised Gesta to some extent, as did Peter Tudebode and the Historia Belli Sacri, with some variations. The Gesta was reworked (some with other eyewitness accounts) by Guibert of Nogent, Baldric of Dol, and Robert the Monk, whose work was the most widely read. Albert's account appears to be written independently of the Gesta, relying on other eyewitness reports. Derivative accounts of the Crusade include Bartolf of Nangis' Gesta Francorum Iherusalem expugnatium, Henry of Huntingdon's De Captione Antiochiae, Sigebert of Gembloux's Chronicon sive Chronographia, and Benedetto Accolti's De Bello a Christianis contra Barbaros.

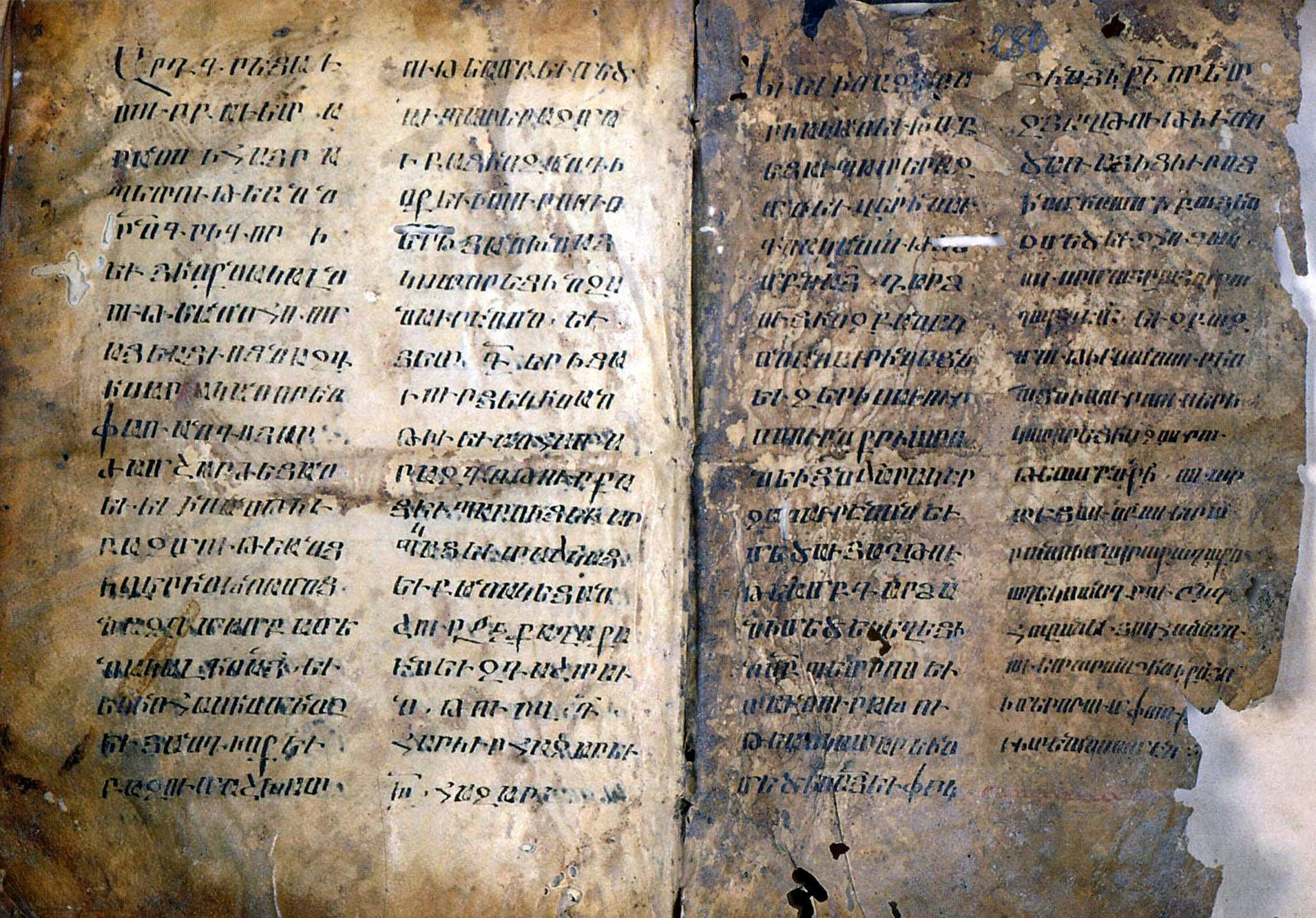
The first known mention of the Frankish conquest of Jerusalem, in an Armenian colophon written in 1099

A 19th-century perspective of these works can be found in Heinrich von Sybel's History and Literature of the Crusades. Von Sybel also discusses some of the more important letters and correspondence from the First Crusade that provide some historical insight. See also the works Die Kreuzzugsbriefe aus den Jahren, 1088–1100, by Heinrich Hagenmeyer and Letters of the Crusaders, by Dana Carleton Munro. Hagenmeyer also prepared the Chronologie de la première croisade 1094–1100, a day-by-day account of the First Crusade, cross-referenced to original sources, with commentary.

=== Later works through the 18th century ===
The popularity of these works shaped how crusading was viewed in the medieval mind. Numerous poems and songs sprung from the First Crusade, including Gilo of Toucy's Historia de via Hierosolymitana. The well-known chanson de geste, Chanson d'Antioche, describes the First Crusade from the original preaching through the taking of Antioch in 1098 and into 1099. Based on Robert's work, Chanson d'Antioche was a valuable resource in helping catalogue participants in the early Crusades and shaped how crusading was viewed in the medieval mind. A later poem was Torquato Tasso's 16th century Gerusalemme liberata, was based on Accolti's work and popular for nearly two centuries. Tasso's work was converted into the biography Godfrey of Bulloigne, or, The recoverie of Jerusalem, by Edward Fairfax.

Later histories include English chronicler Orderic Vitalis' Historia Ecclesiastica. The work was a general social history of medieval England that includes a section on the First Crusade based on Baldric's account, with added details from oral sources and biographical details. The Gesta and the more detailed account of Albert of Aachen were used as the basis of the work of William of Tyre, Historia rerum in partibus transmarinis gestarum and its extensions. The archbishop of Tyre's work was a major primary source for the history of the First Crusade and is regarded as their first analytical history. Later histories, through the 17th century, relied heavily on his writings. These histories used primary source materials, but they used them selectively to talk of Holy War (bellum sacrum), and their emphasis was upon prominent individuals and upon battles and the intrigues of high politics.*****

Others included in Jacques Bongars' work are Historia Hierosolymitana written by theologian and historian Jacques de Vitry, a participant in a later crusade; Historia by Byzantine emperor John VI Kantakouzenos, an account of Godfrey of Bouillon's arrival in Constantinople in 1096; and Liber Secretorum Fidelium Crucis by Venetian statesman and geographer Marino Sanuto, whose work on geography was invaluable to later historians. A biography of Godfrey of Bouillon, Historia et Gesta Ducis Gotfridi seu historia de desidione Terræ sanctæ, was written by anonymous German authors in 1141, relying on the original narratives and later histories, and appears in the RHC.

The first use of the term crusades was by 17th-century French Jesuit and historian Louis Maimbourg in his Histoire des Croisades pour la délivrance de la Terre Sainte, a populist and royalist history of the Crusades from 1195 to 1220. An earlier work by Thomas Fuller, The Historie of the Holy Warre refers to the entire enterprise as the Holy War, with individual campaigns called voyages. Fuller's account was more anecdotal than historical, and was very popular until the Restoration. The work used original sources from Gesta Dei per Francos.

Notable works of the 18th century include Histoire des Croisades, a history of the Crusades from the rise of the Seljuks until 1195 by French philosopher Voltaire. Scottish philosopher and historian David Hume did not write directly of the First Crusade, but his The History of England described the Crusades as the "nadir of Western civilisation." This view was continued by Edward Gibbon in his History of the Decline and Fall of the Roman Empire, excerpted as The Crusades, A.D. 1095–1261. This edition also includes an essay on chivalry by Sir Walter Scott, whose works helped popularise the Crusades.

=== The 19th and 20th centuries ===
Early in the 19th century, the monumental Histoire des Croisades was published by the French historian Joseph François Michaud. under the editorship of Jean Poujoulat. This provided a major new narrative based on original sources and was translated into English as The History of the Crusades. The work covers the First Crusade and its causes, and the crusades through 1481. French historian Jean-François-Aimé Peyré expanded Michaud's work on the First Crusade with his Histoire de la Première Croisade, a 900-page, two-volume set with extensive sourcing.

The English school of Crusader historians included Charles Mills who wrote History of the Crusades for the Recovery and Possession of the Holy Land, a complete history of nine Crusades, disparaging Gibbon's work as superficial. Henry Stebbings wrote his History of Chivalry and the Crusades, a discussion of chivalry and history of the first seven Crusades. Thomas Archer and Charles Kingsford wrote The Crusades: The Story of the Latin Kingdom of Jerusalem, rejecting the idea that the Fourth Crusade and the Albigensian Crusade should be designated as crusades.

The German school of Crusaders was led by Friederich Wilken, whose Geschichte der Kreuzzüge was a complete history of the Crusades, based on Western, Arabic, Greek and Armenian sources. Later, Heinrich von Sybel, who studied under Leopold von Ranke (the father of modern source-based history) challenged the work of William of Tyre as being secondary. His Geschichte des ersten Kreuzzuges was a history of the First Crusade and contains a full study of the authorities for the First Crusade, and was translated to History and Literature of the Crusades by English author Lucie, Lady Duff-Gordon.

The greatest German historian of the Crusades was then Reinhold Röhricht. His histories of the First Crusade, Geschichte des ersten Kreuzzuges, and of the kings of Jerusalem, Geschichte des Königreichs Jerusalem, laid the foundation of all modern crusade research. His Bibliotheca geographica Palaestinae summarises over 3500 books on the geography of the Holy Land, providing a valuable resource for historians. Röhricht's colleague Heinrich Hagenmeyer wrote Peter der Eremite, a critical contribution to the history of the First Crusade and the role of Peter the Hermit.

Two encyclopaedia articles appeared in the early 20th century that are frequently called out by Crusader historians. The first of these is Crusades, by French historian Louis R. Bréhier, appearing in the Catholic Encyclopedia, based on his L'Église et l'Orient au Moyen Âge: Les Croisades. The second is The Crusades, by English historian Ernest Barker, in the Encyclopædia Britannica (11th edition). Collectively, Bréhier and Barker wrote more than 50 articles for these two publications. Barker's work was later revised as The Crusades and Bréhier published Histoire anonyme de la première croisade. According to the Routledge Companion, these articles are evidence that "not all old things are useless."

According to the Routledge Companion, the three works that rank as being monumental by 20th-century standards are: René Grousset's Histoire des croisades et du royaume franc de Jérusalem; Steven Runciman's 3-volume set of A History of the Crusades, and the Wisconsin Collaborative History of the Crusades (Wisconsin History). Grousset's volume on the First Crusade was L'anarchie musulmane, 1095–1130, a standard reference in the mid-twentieth century. The next two are still enjoying widespread use today. Runciman's first volume The First Crusade and the Foundation of the Kingdom of Jerusalem has been criticised for being out-of-date and biased, but remains one of the most widely read accounts of the crusade. The first volume of the Wisconsin History, Volume 1: The First One Hundred Years, first appeared in 1969 and was edited by Marshall W. Baldwin. The chapters on the First Crusade were written by Runciman and Frederic Duncalf and again are dated, but still well-used references. Additional background chapters on related events of the 11th century are: Western Europe, by Sidney Painter; the Byzantine Empire, by Peter Charanis; the Islamic world by H. A. B. Gibb; the Seljuk invasion, by Claude Cahen and the Assassins, by Bernard Lewis.

Bibliographies of works on the First Crusade through the 20th century include ones by French medievalist and Byzantinist Ferdinand Chalandon in his Histoire de la Première Croisade jusqu'à l'élection de Godefroi de Bouillon and the Select Bibliography on the Crusades, compiled by Hans E. Mayer and Joyce McLellan.

=== Modern histories of the First Crusade ===
Since the 1970s, the Crusades have attracted hundreds of scholars to their study, many of whom are identified in the online database Historians of the Crusades, part of the Resources for Studying the Crusades created at Queen Mary University of London in 2007–2008. Some of the more notable historians of the First Crusade include Jonathan Riley-Smith (1938–2016), the leading historian of the Crusades of his generation. His work includes The First Crusade and the Idea of Crusading (1993) and The First Crusaders, 1095–1131 (1998). His doctoral students are among the most renowned in the world and he led the team that created the Database of Crusaders to the Holy Land, 1096–1149. Carole Hillenbrand (born 1943) is an Islamic scholar whose work The Crusades: Islamic Perspectives (1999) discusses themes that highlight how Muslims reacted to the presence of the Crusaders in the heart of traditionally Islamic territory and is regarded as one of the most influential works on the First Crusade. Other current researchers include Christopher Tyerman (born 1953) whose God's War: A New History of the Crusades (2006) is regarded as the definitive account of all the crusades. In his An Eyewitness History of the Crusades (2004), Tyerman provides the history of the crusades told from original eyewitness sources, both Christian and Muslim. Thomas Asbridge (born 1969) has written The First Crusade: A New History: The Roots of Conflict between Christianity and Islam (2004) and the more expansive The Crusades: The Authoritative History of the War for the Holy Land (2012). Thomas Madden (born 1960) has written The New Concise History of the Crusades (2005) and The Real History of the Crusades (2011). The Crusades—An Encyclopedia (2006) edited by historian Alan V. Murray provides a comprehensive treatment of the Crusades with over 1000 entries written by 120 authors from 25 countries. The list of other historians is extensive and excellent bibliographies include that by Asbridge and in The Routledge Companion to the Crusades.

== See also ==
- Pilgrim's Road, followed by the Crusaders

== Bibliography ==
- Archer, Thomas Andrew (1904). The Crusades: The Story of the Latin Kingdom of Jerusalem. Putnam.
- Asbridge, Thomas (2000). The Creation of the Principality of Antioch, 1098–1130. Boydell & Brewer. ISBN 978-0-85115-661-3.
- Asbridge, Thomas (2004). The First Crusade: A New History. Oxford. ISBN 0-19-517823-8.
- Asbridge, Thomas (2012). The Crusades: The War for the Holy Land. Oxford University Press. ISBN 978-1849837705.
- Barker, Ernest (1923). The Crusades. Simon & Schuster. ISBN 978-1-84983-688-3.
- Biddle, Martin (1999). The Tomb of Christ. Scarborough: Sutton Publishing. ISBN 978-0-7509-1926-5. Archived from the original on 8 November 2023.
- Carey, Brian; Allfree, Joshua; Cairns, John (2023). Warfare in the Age of the Crusades. Pen and Sword Military. ISBN 9781526730244.
- Cahen, Claude (1940). La Syrie du nord à l'époque des croisades et la principauté franque d'Antioche. Études arabes, médiévales et modernes. P. Geuthner, Paris. ISBN 978-2351594186.
- Cahen, Claude (1968). Pre-Ottoman Turkey. Taplinger Publishing Company. ISBN 978-1597404563.
- Chalandon, Ferdinand (1925). Histoire de la Première Croisade jusqu'à l'élection de Godefroi de Bouillon. Picard.
- Curta, Florin (2006). Southeastern Europe in the Middle Ages, 500–1250. Cambridge: Cambridge University Press. ISBN 978-0-521-81539-0.
- Edgington, Susan B. (2019). Baldwin I of Jerusalem, 1100–1118. Taylor & Francis. ISBN 978-1317176404.
- France, John (1994), Victory in the East: A Military History of the First Crusade, Cambridge University Press, ISBN 978-0521589871
- Frankopan, Peter (2012). The First Crusade: The Call from the East. Harvard University Press. ISBN 978-0-674-05994-8.
- Gil, Moshe (1997) [1983]. A History of Palestine, 634–1099. Translated by Ethel Broido. Cambridge: Cambridge University Press. ISBN 0-521-59984-9.
- Hagenmeyer, Heinrich (1902). Chronologie de la première croisade 1094–1100. E. Leroux, Paris.
- Hillenbrand, Carole (1999). The Crusades: Islamic Perspectives. Routledge. ISBN 978-0748606306.
- Holt, Peter M. (1989). The Age of the Crusades: The Near East from the Eleventh Century to 1517. Longman. ISBN 0-582-49302-1.
- Holt, Peter M. (2004). The Crusader States and Their Neighbours, 1098–1291. Pearson Longman. ISBN 978-0-582-36931-3.
- Jotischky, Andrew (2004). Crusading and the Crusader States. Taylor & Francis. ISBN 978-0-582-41851-6.
- Kaldellis, Anthony (2017). Streams of Gold, Rivers of Blood. Oxford University Press. ISBN 978-0190253226.
- Konstam, Angus (2004). Historical Atlas of the Crusades. Mercury Books. ISBN 1-904668-00-3.
- Lapina, Elizabeth (2015). Warfare and the Miraculous in the Chronicles of the First Crusade. Pennsylvania State University Press. ISBN 978-0271066707.
- Lock, Peter (2006). Routledge Companion to the Crusades. New York: Routledge. doi:10.4324/9780203389638. ISBN 0-415-39312-4.
- Madden, Thomas (2005). New Concise History of the Crusades. Rowman & Littlefield. ISBN 0-7425-3822-2.
- Murray, Alan V. (2006). The Crusades – An Encyclopedia. ABC-CLIO. ISBN 978-1-57607-862-4. Archived from the original on 26 March 2023.
- Nicolle, David (2003). The First Crusade, 1096–99: Conquest of the Holy Land. Osprey Publishing. ISBN 1-84176-515-5.
- Oman, Charles (1924). A History of the Art of War in the Middle Ages. Metheun.
- Peacock, Andrew C. S. (2015). The Great Seljuk Empire. Edinburgh University Press. ISBN 978-0748638260.
- Peters, Edward (1998). The First Crusade: "The Chronicle of Fulcher of Chartres" and Other Source Materials. University of Pennsylvania Press. ISBN 978-0812204728.
- Riley-Smith, Jonathan (1991). The First Crusade and the Idea of Crusading. University of Pennsylvania. ISBN 0-8122-1363-7.
- Riley-Smith, Jonathan (1998). The First Crusaders, 1095–1131. Cambridge. ISBN 0-521-64603-0.
- Riley-Smith, Jonathan (2005). The Crusades: A History (2nd ed.). Yale University Press. ISBN 0-8264-7270-2.
- Robson, William (1855). The Great Sieges of History. Routledge.
- Runciman, Steven (1951). A History of the Crusades, Volume One: The First Crusade and the Foundation of the Kingdom of Jerusalem. Cambridge University Press. ISBN 978-0521061612.
- Runciman, Steven (1992). The First Crusade. Cambridge University Press. ISBN 978-0521232555.
- Setton, Kenneth M. (1969). A History of the Crusades. Six Volumes. University of Wisconsin Press.
- Tyerman, Christopher (2006). God's War: A New History of the Crusades. Cambridge: Belknap Press of Harvard University Press. ISBN 0-674-02387-0.
- Tyerman, Christopher (2011). The Debate on the Crusades, 1099–2010. Manchester University Press. ISBN 978-0-7190-7320-5.
- Tyerman, Christopher (2019). The World of the Crusades. Yale University Press. ISBN 978-0-300-21739-1.
- Yewdale, Ralph Bailey (1917). Bohemond I, Prince of Antioch. Princeton University.
