= Heidelberg Codex =

Heidelberg Codex may refer to:

- Codex Heidelbergensis 921 (8th–9th century), manuscript of Jordanes
- Kleine Heidelberger Liederhandschrift (13th century), manuscript of Minnesang
- Codex Manesse (14th century), manuscript of Minnesang
- Heidelberger Liederhandschrift cpg 350 (c. 1300), manuscript of Middle High German poetry
- Prague, Národní Galerie, AA 2015 (c. 1575), a copy of the work of the Master of the Luxembourg Genealogy
