= Codex Heidelbergensis 921 =

Parchment codex from the 8th–9th century

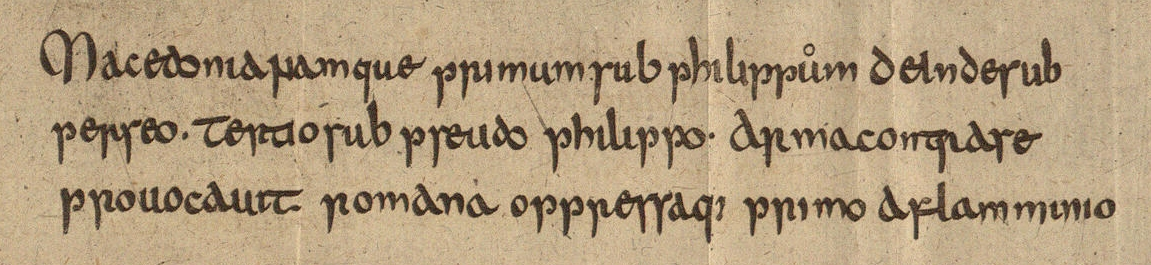
Copy of an excerpt from the text of the Heidelberg Codex included in Friedrich Wilken's catalog (1817)

The Codex Heidelbergensis 921 ("Heidelberg Codex") or Codex Palatinus Latinus 921 is a parchment codex dated to the 8th–9th century, containing a copy of the Romana and Getica of Jordanes. It was destroyed in a fire on the night of July 15–16, 1880.

== Physical description ==
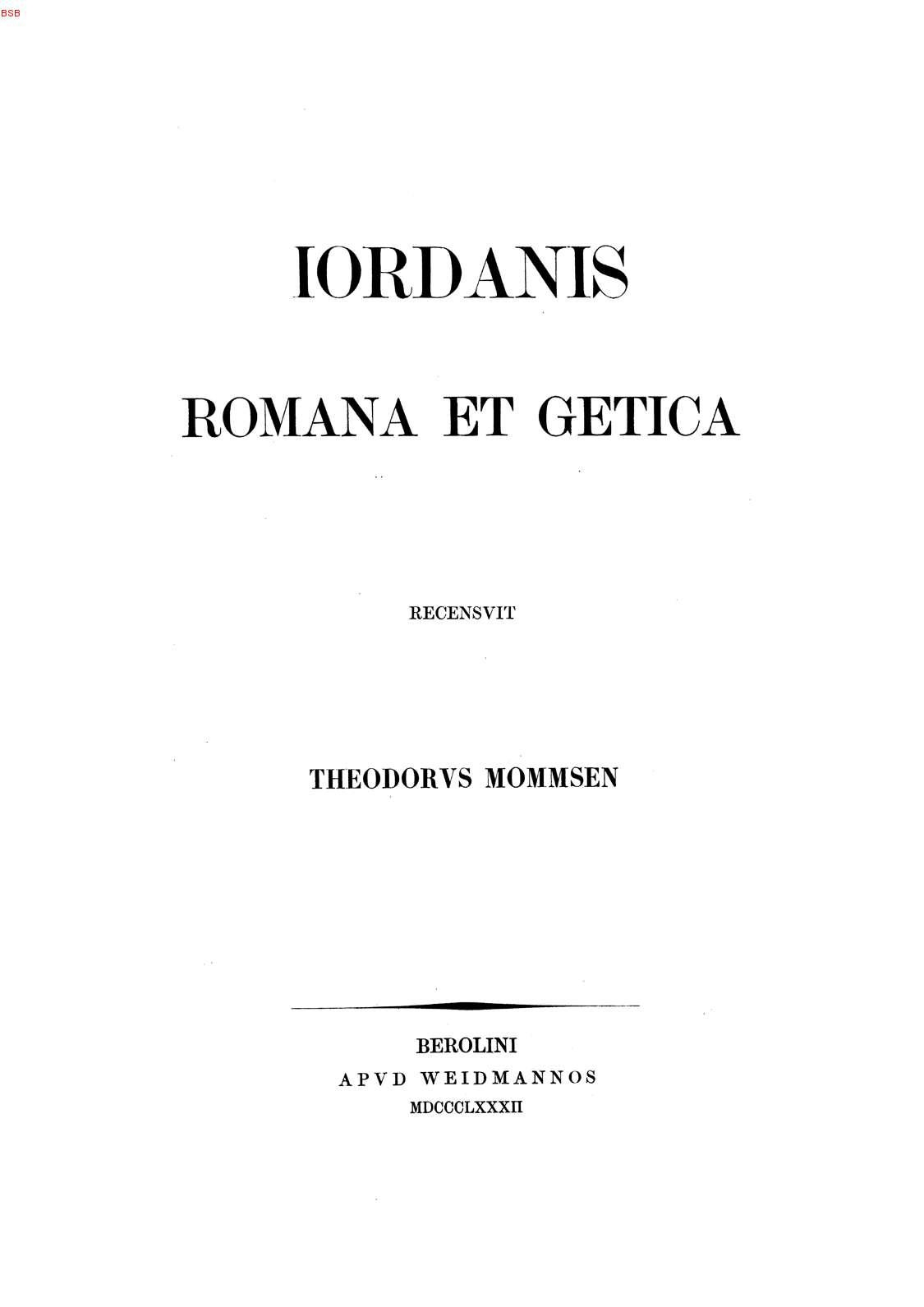
Title page of Mommsen's edition of Jordanes' works

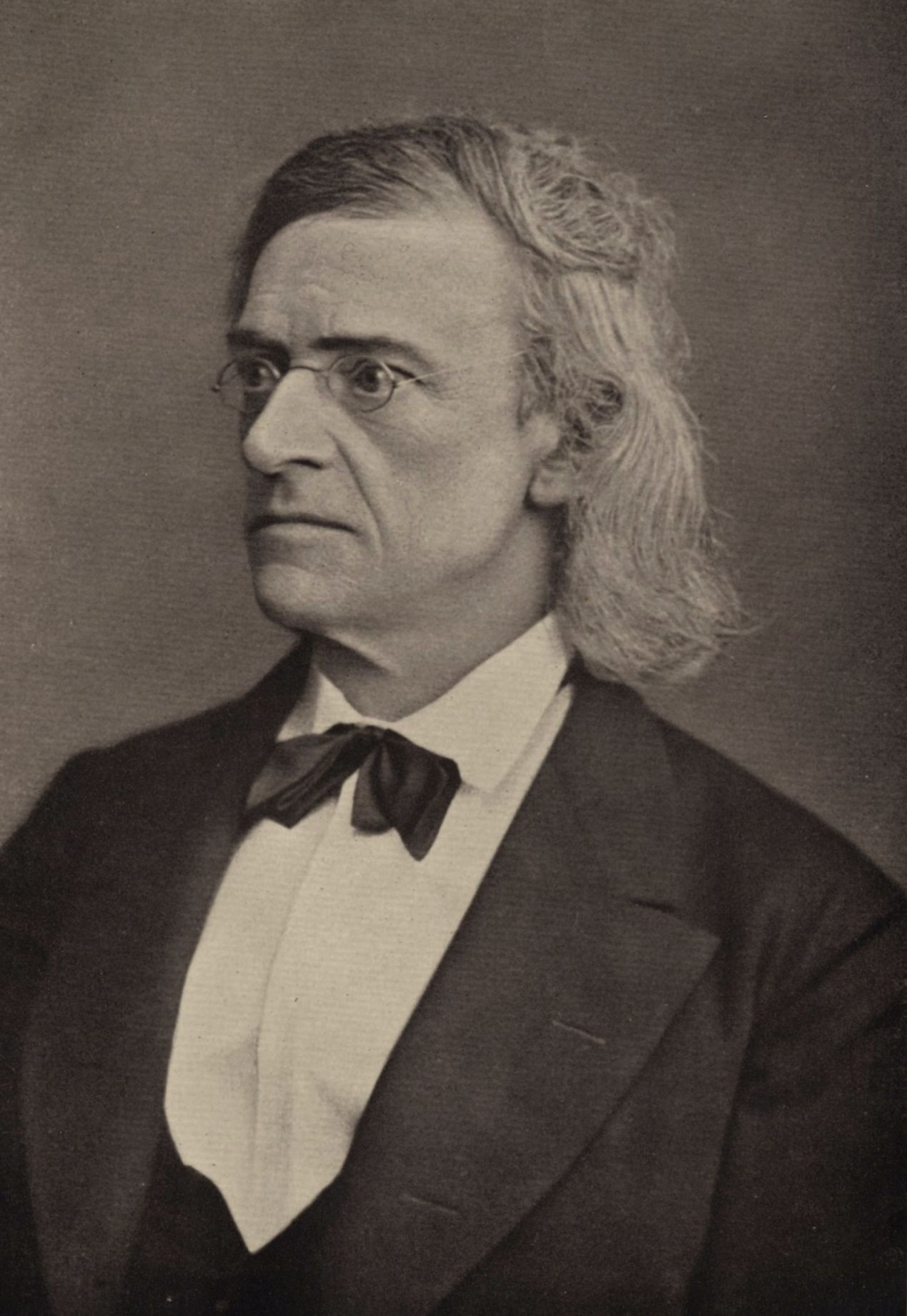
Theodor Mommsen around 1870. Photograph

Originally, this codex consisted of 15 quaternions, totaling 120 leaves. According to the inventory of Heidelberg codices after the Congress of Vienna in 1816, it contained only 110 leaves, or 220 pages of variously described formats: folio, quadratae maioris, or large quarto. The entire first gathering was missing, and the last one had only 6 leaves. According to the description by Theodor Mommsen from 1882, 110 leaves were written on, the first two leaves and the last one (i.e., 1, 2, and 112) were blank, and the foliation resulted from duplicating leaf 17.

This manuscript is identified under the signature of the library in the Heidelberg University – Palat. Lat. 921. According to the systematics of Codices Latini Antiquiores, in which it was described in Part VIII, it is numbered as 1224.

No facsimile of any fragment of this manuscript has survived. There is only an illustration of a copy of a fragment of the text of the Romana (part of caput 215) included in Friedrich Wilken's catalog from 1817, which Wilken described in the appendix to his Geschichte der Bildung, Beraubung und Vernichtung der alten Heidelbergischen Büchersammlungen from 1817, and Theodor Mommsen in the introduction to the edition of Jordanes' works from 1882. The description was also included in Part VIII of Codices Latini Antiquiores from 1959.

== Dating, place of origin and handwriting ductus ==
The writing of this codex is dated respectively: rather to the 8th than to the 9th century, to the 8th–9th century, or to the turn of the 8th and 9th centuries. The place of origin is considered to be Germany, in one of the scriptoria in the area of Mainz or (which cannot be proven) perhaps in the Princely Abbey of Fulda, from where it would likely have made its way to Mainz, probably through the agency of Marianus Scotus. German provenance is inferred from an interlinear gloss in Old High German: the word suagur (English: brother-in-law) written next to the Latin cognatus in the Romana (c. 337).

The codex was written in Insular minuscule, in a style used on the European continent. This script was characterized mainly by the large descenders of minuscule letters, including the letters r and s. The letter a is often unclosed, and i is slightly larger. Corrections to grammar were made in the codex during the Middle Ages, but not very heavily, so the original script is still visible in most places.

== Content and meaning ==
The codex contained two works by Jordanes: the Romana and the Getica. Already in the early 19th century, there were missing pages containing the beginning of the Romana (up to the last words of caput 56 – the text begins with the words et finis) and the end of the Getica (the ending of caput 299 is missing – the text breaks off at the word regi – and the following 17 capita). The beginning of the Getica text was located on page 51.

Mommsen considered the transmission of the codex to be the best among those known to him, although the text of this manuscript rarely spoke against others. He classified it as belonging to the first class of transmissions, in which it was the best. In the codex copy of Jordanes, a few words were omitted in two places in the Getica: part of caput 200 (fide et consilio ut diximus clarus) and part of 222 (obicientes exemplo veriti regis), and there were few errors (fourteen in total) where other manuscripts of this group transmit the correct script.

== History ==
The first definite information about the whereabouts of the manuscript is an ownership note from the year 1479 of the cathedral library in Mainz. This note was entered on the first leaf and read: iste liber pertinet ad librariam sancti Martini ecclesie Maguntin. M(acarius) Sindicus s(ub)s(cripsi)t 1479, which translates to this codex belongs to the library of the church of St. Martin in Mainz. M[akarius von Buseck], syndic, wrote [this] in 1479. Additionally, the volume was described with the following note: 1651 – $\tfrac{646}{566}$ – h 13. Then the codex became part of the collection of the Bibliotheca Palatina in Heidelberg, where it was used by Jan Gruter. In 1622, along with the rest of the collection, the codex was in Rome, where it remained until the Napoleonic Wars. It was then transported to Paris, from where, as a result of the Vienna Congress agreements, it returned to Heidelberg. The manuscript, along with three other manuscripts (also containing texts of Jordanes' works), burned in the fire at the house of Theodor Mommsen, publisher of the Romana and Getica in the Monumenta Germaniae Historica series, on the night of July 15–16, 1880, in Charlottenburg.

=== Lausanne fragment (Ms. 398) ===
At the beginning of the 20th century, Marius Besson discovered a fragment of one leaf of an old medieval manuscript at the Musée historiographie vaudoise. (Note: Founded in 1896 by Paul Vionnet.) This fragment was transferred to the Cantonal and University Library in Lausanne and was assigned the signature Ms. 398, under which it is currently known. On both sides of the leaf, there are fragments of Chapter 60 of Jordanes' Getica written in Anglo-Saxon minuscule, which is why Besson considered this fragment to be one of the lost leaves of the Heidelberg Codex. However, this attribution was negated in the entry in the Codices Latini Antiquiores due to differences in the writing styles. Additionally, a meticulous comparative analysis of the script from the Lausanne relic by Sandra Bertelli with the fragment from Wilken's catalogue excluded the possibility of identifying the creators of both inscriptions. Given the impossibility of determining the number of copyists working on the Heidelberg Codex, any further conclusions are impossible to draw.

== Bibliography ==
- Bertelli, S. (2008). "Sul frammento dei Getica di Giordano conservato a Losanna". In Coulson, Frank T.; Grotans, Anna A. (eds.). Classica et Beneventana. Essays Presented to Virginia Brown on the Occasion of her 65th Birthday. Textes et Études du Moyen Âge. Vol. 36. Turnhout: Brepols Publishers.
- Butterfield, D. J. (2013). The early textual history of Lucretius' De rerum natura. Cambridge Classical Studies. Cambridge: Cambridge University Press.
- Lowe, E. A., ed. (1959). Codices Latini Antiquiores. A Paleographical Guide to Latin Manuscripts prior to the Ninth Century. Part VIII: Germany. Altenburg-Leipzig. Oxford: The American Historical Review.
- Falk, Franz (1897). Die ehemalige Dombibliothek zu Mainz, ihre Entstehung, Verschleppung und Vernichtung nach gedruckten und ungedruckten Quellen. Beiheft zum Centralblatt für Bibliothekswesen (in German). Vol. 18. Leipzig: O. Harrassowitz.
- Jordanes (1984). "O pochodzeniu i czynach Gotów". In Zwolski, E. (ed.). Kasjodor i Jordanes. Historia gocka, czyli scytyjska Europa. Rozprawy Wydziału Historyczno-Filologicznego (in Polish). Vol. 49. Translated by Zwolski, E. Lublin: Towarzystwo Naukowe Katolickiego Uniwersytetu Lubelskiego.
- Kautz, M. "Wien, Österreichische Nationalbibliothek. Cod. 203 (olim Hist. prof. 652) – Wissenschaftliche Beschreibung" (PDF). Bibliotheca Lauresheimensis digital (in German).
- Mommsen, Theodor (1882). "Prooemium". Iordanis Romana et Getica. Monumenta Germaniae Historica. Auctores Antiquissimi. Vol. 5. Berlin: Weidmann.
- Schultze, Wilhelm (1907). "Ahd. suagur". Zeitschrift für vergleichende Sprachforschung (in German). 40.
- Steinmeyer, Elias; Sievers, Eduard (1922). Die althochdeutschen Glossen (in German). Vol. V. Berlin: Weidmann.
- Wilken, Friedrich (1817). Geschichte der Bildung, Beraubung und Vernichtung der alten Heidelbergischen Büchersammlungen. Ein Beytrag zur Literärgeschichte vornehmlich des funfzehnten und sechszehnten Jahrhunderts. Nebst einem meist beschreibenden Verzeichniß der im Jahr 1816 von dem Papst Pius VII. der Universität Heidelberg zurückgegebenen Handschriften und einigen Schriftproben (in German). Heidelberg.
