= Massacre of Jerusalem (1099) =

Slaughter of Muslims and Jews by Christian Crusaders

- Part of First Crusade
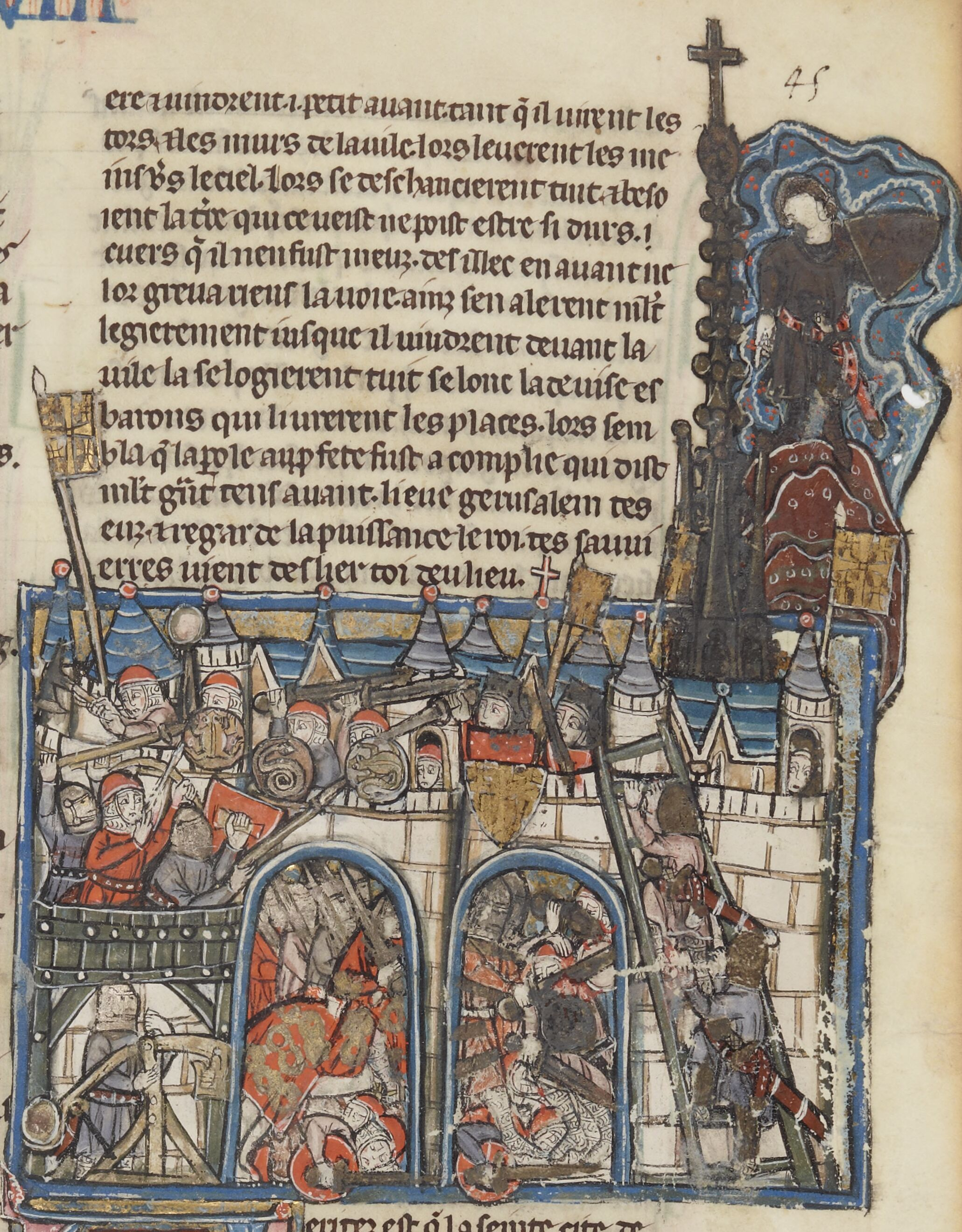
- Massacre of Jerusalem from the Historia Ierosolimitana, William of Tyre, c. 14th century
- Location: Jerusalem
- Date: July 15, 1099
- Victims: Muslims and Jews
- Perpetrator: Crusaders
- Motive: Religious violence Antisemitism

The Massacre of Jerusalem was a mass slaughter of thousands of Muslims and Jews by the sieging Crusaders in mid-July 1099, following the Siege of Jerusalem during the First Crusade. Contemporaneous and eyewitness sources suggest the massacre was widespread, occurring alongside the conversion of Muslim sites on the Temple Mount, including the al-Aqsa Mosque and Dome of the Rock, into Christian holy places.

Historians and eyewitness crusader accounts emphasize that the massacre was especially brutal, even by the standards of ancient and medieval warfare. Christopher Tyerman characterizes the event as a "juxtaposition of extreme violence and anguished faith," and Jay Rubenstein cites an eyewitness who described it as "more of a slaughter than a fight." Some historians assert that the severity of the massacre was exaggerated by later medieval sources.

== Background ==
One main inspiration for the Crusades was the preaching of apocalypticism by figures such as Peter the Hermit and his followers (namely, Volkmar and Emicho), rousing knights, commoners, and nobles to march to Jerusalem. The preaching of Pope Urban II also used the crucifixion narrative as a motivator, alluding to the guilt of Jewish people who, at the time, were seen as unbelieving adversaries by many Christians of France and Germany. This animosity motivated the Rhineland massacres by Emicho and the slaughters in Prague by Volkmar, establishing the People's Crusade as a violent movement as the armies often pillaged their way through Europe.

After suffering defeats by the Kingdom of Hungary and Seljuk Turks, the survivors of the People's Crusade merged with the Prince's Crusade, joining the ranks for extreme endeavors such as the Siege of Antioch and Siege of Ma'arra, where the Christian forces became so starved they resorted to the cannibalism of fallen enemies. When the Crusaders finally arrived at Jerusalem, they were filled with zeal, leading barefoot processions around the city walls before laying siege, finally breaking through and panicking the Fatimid defenses.

== Massacre ==
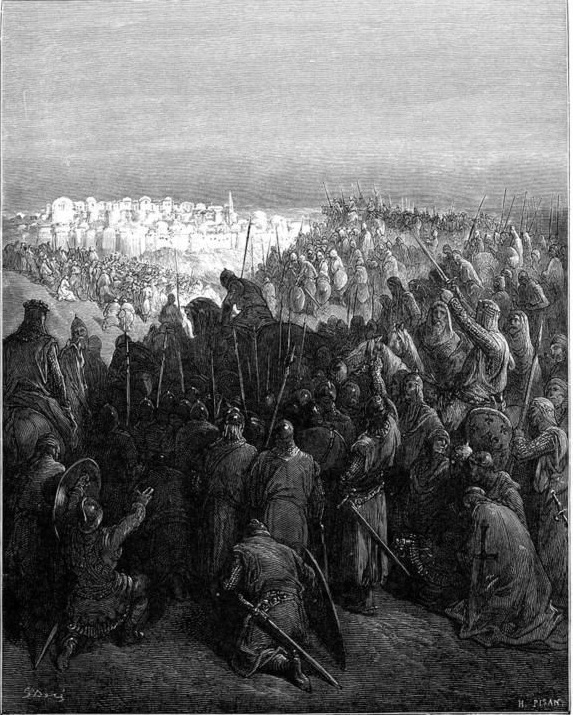
Enthusiasm of Crusaders at the First View of Jerusalem by Gustave Doré, c. 19th century

=== Muslims ===
Tyerman describes the slaughter following the siege as a "sustained massacre in the hysteria of success, followed three days' later by more cold-blooded mass killing." As the Crusaders stormed the city, Muslim inhabitants hid in the al-Aqsa Mosque and/or Dome of the Rock of the Temple Mount. The Gesta Francorum writes that "... the slaughter was so great that our men waded in blood up to their ankles..." and eyewitness Raymond of Aguilers wrote about how "the porch of Solomon men rode in blood up to their knees and bridle reins." Robert the Monk recorded how the blood flowed so forcefully and deeply that it carried the severed limbs and heads down the avenues of the city, resulting in messes of body parts scrambled and unidentifiable.

Fulcher of Chartres, chronicling the Crusade in his eyewitness Gesta Francorum Iherusalem Peregrinantium, recorded that the death toll in the temple alone reached 10,000 and that "none of them were left alive; neither women nor children were spared," but mentions survivors:

When the pagans had been overcome, our men seized great numbers, both men and women, either killing them or keeping them captive, as they wished. [...] [Our leaders] also ordered all the Saracen dead to be cast outside because of the great stench, since the whole city was filled with their corpses; and so the living Saracens dragged the dead before the exits of the gates and arranged them in heaps, as if they were houses. No one ever saw or heard of such slaughter of pagan people, for funeral pyres were formed from them like pyramids, and no one knows their number except God alone. But Raymond caused the Emir and the others who were with him to be conducted to Ascalon, whole and unhurt.

Crusaders brutalized the bodies of dead Muslims, slicing them open and "eviscerating them from the head to the kidneys and cutting them lengthwise from left to right," and many were decapitated, hit with arrows, and burned alive in the ensuing pyromania. Historian Ibn al-Athir records that after Jerusalem was sieged and pillaged, "a band of Muslims barricaded themselves into the Oratory of David (Mihrab Dawud) and fought on for several days. They were granted their lives in return for surrendering. The Franks honored their word and the group left by night for Ascalon." According to Ibn Muyassar, the Crusaders burned copies of the Quran and, according to al-Athir, they executed a large group of imams, scholars, ascetics, and other holy men.

Despite Tancred offering protection to the Muslims of the Temple area, the fellow crusaders overrode such security and slaughtered them, thereafter claiming the Muslim holy places of the Dome of the Rock and the al-Aqsa mosque as important Christian sites and renaming them Templum Domini and Templum Salomonis, respectively. Albert of Aachen, compiling eyewitness accounts of Crusaders who returned to Europe, mentions a second round of massacre.

=== Jews ===
The Crusade began with the massacres of the Jewish inhabitants of the Rhineland. Within the medieval Islamic world, Jewish people were considered 'People of the Book' and treated with a measure of tolerance but also levied special taxes and also had a lower legal status (see dhimma). According to Muslim sources Jews suffered in the massacre alongside the Muslim denizens. Jewish Jerusalemites defended their city from the besieging Christians, fighting side-by-side with Muslim soldiers until the Crusaders breached the walls and the Jewish civilians fled into a synagogue to "prepare for death". According to Ibn al-Qalanisi, "The Jews assembled in their synagogue, and the Franks burned it over their heads." Crusaders reportedly lifted their shields and encircled the burning building while singing "Christ We Adore Thee!"

However, a Jewish communication (written just two weeks after the siege) confirms the burning of the synagogue without mentioning any people inside during the destruction. Specifically, a Cairo Geniza letter refers to Jewish citizens fleeing the Fatimid governor.

=== Eastern Christians ===
According to the anonymous Syriac Chronicle, Fatimid governor Iftikhar al-Dawla expelled many of the Christians from Jerusalem before the Crusaders arrived. Eyewitness accounts do not mention the slaughter of Eastern Christians in the city. The Gesta Francorum corroborates this claim by mentioning how, over two weeks following the massacre, Peter the Hermit encouraged all "Greek and Latin priests and clerics" to make thanksgiving at the Church of the Holy Sepulchre, suggesting the survival of Eastern Christian clergy.

== Aftermath ==
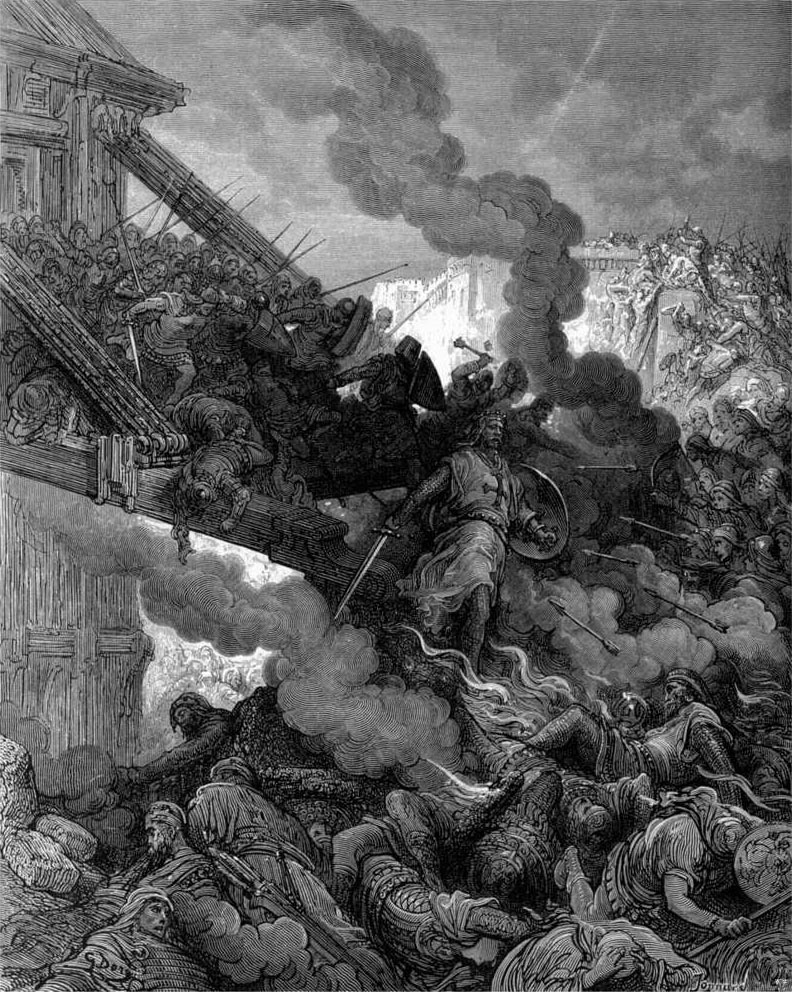
Godfrey Enters Jerusalem by Gustave Doré, c. 19th century

After the slaughtering and plundering, the Crusaders took the time to worship at their newly conquered holy places. Godfrey of Bouillon led a barefoot procession around Jerusalem's walls, entering the city through the Mount of Olives and marching into the Church of the Holy Sepulchre, where they prayed and Godfrey wept in thanksgiving. Meanwhile, Raymond and Tancred began taking hostages among the survivors and Crusaders sliced the bellies of killed Muslims in hopes of finding gold swallowed during the massacre. Despite Tancred's efforts to safeguard his Muslim prisoners, a mob of Crusaders slaughtered them all. By the third day of the conquest, the massacre continued into his final stage as, as recorded by Albert of Aix:

"[Crusaders] were beheading or striking down with stones girls, women, noble ladies, even pregnant women, and very young children [...] some were wound about the Christians' feet, begging them with piteous weeping and wailing for their lives and safety [...] But they were making these signals for pity and mercy in vain. The Christians gave over their whole hearts to the slaughter, so that not a suckling little male child or female, not even an infant of one year would escape alive the hand of the murderer.

Crusaders tasked the survivors with getting rid of the bodies, piling the dead in heaps outside the gates, which remained outside the city even six months later during Christmastime, as remarked upon by Fulcher of Chartes when he made holiday pilgrimage from Edessa to Jerusalem:

"Oh, how great was the stench at that time, both inside and outside the city walls, because of the Saracen corpses, still rotting there, killed when our comrades captured the city! It was so bad that we had to stop up our noses and mouths."

== Legacy ==
Raymond of Aguilers perceived the event as having immense historical and theological significance, both as a triumph of Christendom over the "pagans", and as a step towards the Apocalypse and Second Coming. Islamic historian Carole Hillenbrand writes that the Muslim sources understood the significance of the massacre and, in summarizing said sources, she writes, "there is no recognition of motivation [...] the conquest of the city is a disastrous event recorded with great sadness but without reflection; it is an event to be suffered and from which lessons are to be learned.

== See also ==
- People's Crusade
- First Crusade
