= Iftikhar al-Dawla =

11th c. Egyptian Fatimid governor of Jerusalem

- إفتخار الدولة
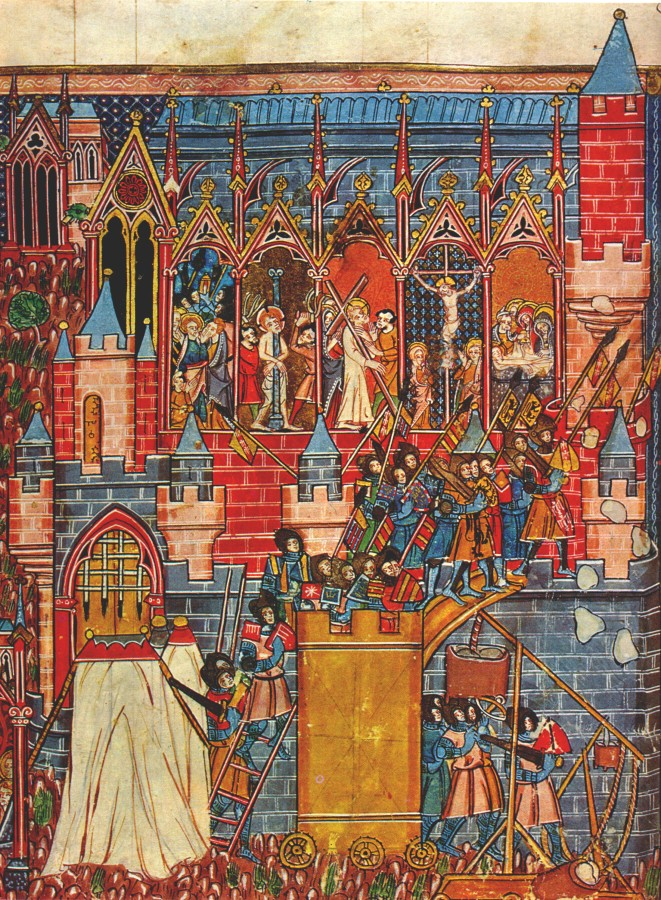
- Depiction of the 1099 siege of Jerusalem, during which Iftikhar al-Dawla was Fatimid governor.
- Known for: Being the governor of Jerusalem during the 1099 siege of the city

Iftikhar al-Dawla (Arabic: إفتخار الدولة, lit. 'pride of the dynasty' or 'pride of the state') was an Egyptian Fatimid governor of Jerusalem during the Siege and Massacre of 1099. On 15 July, he surrendered Jerusalem to Raymond of Saint-Gilles in the Tower of David and was escorted out of the city with his bodyguard.

== Life ==
Iftikhar al-Dawla is mentioned as governor of Ascalon following the fall of Jerusalem, which suggests he was Fatimid governor of the whole of Palestine. The Syrian chronicler Bar-Hebraeus refers to him as an Egyptian man. Usama ibn Munqidh's autobiography mentions an emir of the local castles of Abu Qubays, Qadmus and al-Kaf called Iftikhar al-Dawla whose sister was married to Ibn Munqidh's uncle, the ruler of Shayzar.

Tasso's The Liberation of Jerusalem says that he met Godfrey of Bouillon “in the high court of France where I came as Egypt’s envoy long ago.” (Max Wickert translation.)

=== Defense of Jerusalem ===
Iftikhar al-Dawla had a strong garrison of Arab and Nubian troops. Hearing of the advance of the Franks he poisoned the wells outside Jerusalem, moved livestock from the pastures inside the city walls, and sent urgently to Egypt for reinforcements. He then ordered all Christians, then the majority of the population, to evacuate the city, but allowed Jews to remain within. He observed the initial Crusaders in their chanting procession around the city walls (mimicking the Fall of Jericho) with some throwing themselves against the wall, intending to scale it without a ladder. Although the garrison was well-supplied it was insufficient to man all the walls and was overwhelmed after a siege lasting six weeks.

== Bibliography ==
- Geary, Patrick J. (2003). Readings in Medieval History. Broadview Press. ISBN 1-55111-550-6
- Nicolle, David (2003). The First Crusade 1096–1099: Conquest of the Holy Land. Osprey. ISBN 1-84176-515-5.
- Runciman, Steven (1992). The First Crusade. Cambridge University Press. ISBN 0-521-42705-3.
