= Friedrich Wilken =

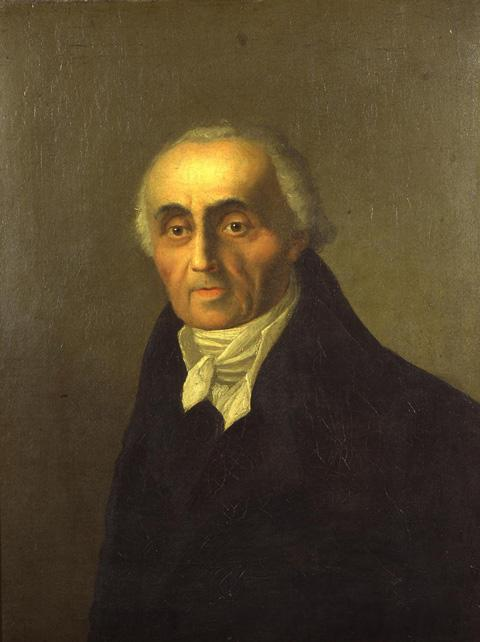
- Born: 23 May 1777; Ratzeburg
- Died: 24 December 1840; Berlin
- Education: University of Göttingen
- Occupations: Librarian; historian; university teacher; philologist
- Employers: University of Berlin; Heidelberg University; Humboldt University of Berlin

Friedrich Wilken (23 May 1777 in Ratzeburg – 24 December 1840 in Berlin) was a German historian (orientalist), professor and librarian.

He was born 23 May 1777, at Ratzeburg, in the duchy of Lauenburg. He studied at Gottingen, at first theology, but afterwards, classic and Oriental philology and history. In 1798 he received the prize for an essay, De Bellorum Cruciatorum ex Abulfeda Historia; in 1805 he was appointed professor of history at Heidelberg, and in 1807 director of the university library. In 1817 he was called to Berlin as first librarian and professor in the university, and in 1819 he was made a member of the Academy of Sciences. He undertook a literary journey to Italy in 1826; in 1829 he went in behalf of the government to France and England, and in 1838 to Wiesbaden and Munich. He died on 24 December 1840. His main work is the Geschichte der Kreuzzüge nach morgenländischen und abendländischehn Berichten (Leipzig, 1807-32, 7 volumes). He also wrote, Geschihte der Bildung, Beraubung und Vernichtunag der alten Heidelberger Büchersammlung ( Heidelberg, 1817): — Geschichte der königlichen Bibliothek zu Berlin (Berlin, 1828).
