= Christian forces of the First Crusade =

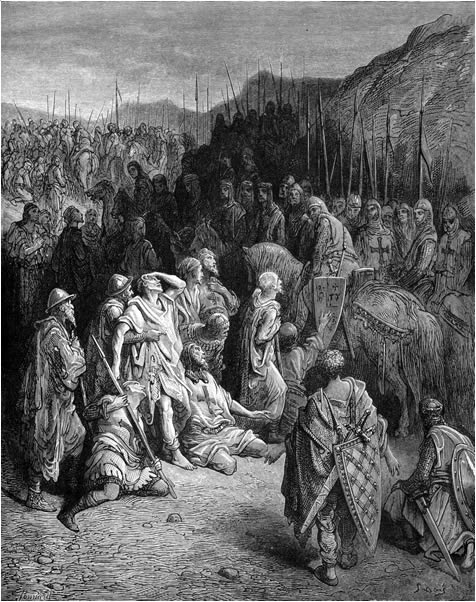
People's Crusade merges with the Prince's Crusade as the survivors under Peter the Hermit meet the army of Godfrey of Bouillon, Gustave Doré, c. 19th century.

The following is an overview of the Christian forces of the First Crusade, including the armies of the European noblemen of the "Princes' Crusade", the Byzantine army, independent Crusaders, as well as the People's Crusade and the subsequent Crusade of 1101 and other European campaigns prior to the Second Crusade beginning in 1147. The total strength of the armies of the Princes' Crusade is estimated at 40,000, including 4,500 nobles. It has been estimated that no more than 20% were non-combatants and a cavalry-to-infantry ratio of about 1:7, for rough estimates of just below 5,000 cavalry and 30,000 infantry at the beginning of the expedition.

Unless otherwise noted, references are to the on-line database of Riley-Smith, et al., and the hyperlinks therein provide details including original sources. The names below are also referenced in the Riley-Smith tome.

== People's Crusade ==
The People's Crusade, also known as the Peasant's Crusade, preceded the First Crusade. and was led by Peter the Hermit as well as other colorful characters. The crusade accomplished little other than the slaughter of Jews and those in the army. The major players were Peter and his deputy Walter Sans-Avoir. Most of the army were peasants with their wives and children, accompanied by some minor knights, brigands, and criminals. It is said that he had as many as 20,000 followers, primarily from France and Germany, but also including some Flemish, Italians, and Italo-Norman followers. An army of Bohemians and Saxons did not go beyond Hungary before splitting.

Upon Peter's failure as a leader, his army was divided into two contingents:

- The German and Italian contingent, under the command of Rainald of Broyes, an Italian lord, who took control after Peter's failure. After defeat during the Siege of Xerigordos, Rainald and others converted to Islam while those who did not were executed.
- The French contingent, under the command of Geoffrey Burel. Geoffrey subsequently deserted his post.

Three other armies joined to essentially attack the Jews and were eventually slaughtered by the Hungarians:

- Gottschalk, leader of a popular crusade of over 10,000 soldiers that carried out persecutions of Jews and was dispersed in Hungary.
- Volkmar (or, Folkmar), a preacher with a popular crusade of about 10,000 soldiers which attacked the Jewish population of Prague and was subsequently destroyed in Hungary.
- The German army of Count Emicho, which plundered and raided the Rhineland.

The Tafurs were a possibly legendary sect of followers who travelled with Peter barefoot and wearing only sackcloth. They were led by a knight whose name remains unknown. They apparently supplemented their diet of roots and grass with the roasted corpses of dead Turks, fought with only sticks and shovels, and were either slaughtered or died of disease.

Following the Battle of Civetot, the People's Crusade were severely diminished and these survivors, who still followed Peter the Hermit, joined the forces of the Prince's Crusade into Palestine.

== European armies ==
The major armies of the Princes' Crusade were the following:

- The armies of Bohemond of Taranto, led by Bohemond of Taranto, who fought both in the First Crusade and the Crusade of 1101. Once the armies of Europe gathered in Constantinople, they acted in concert under the leadership of Bohemond in the first battles. His nephew Tancred was a major commander in Bohemond's army.
- The army of Godfrey of Bouillon, led by Godfrey, Duke of Lower Lorraine, which fielded the first three kings of Jerusalem, although Godfrey refused the title of king, preferring to be called the Protector of the Holy Sepulchre.
- The provençal army of Raymond of Saint-Gilles, led by Raymond IV, Count of Toulouse. Raymond was the only major commander who did not swear an oath of fealty to the Byzantine emperor. One of his major military leaders was Adhemar of Le Puy. Raymond also fielded an army for the Crusade of 1101, participating in the siege of Tripoli where he died.
- The army of Robert Curthose of Normandy, led by Robert of Normandy, the eldest son of William the Conqueror. He and Robert of Flanders returned home together.
- The army of Robert II of Flanders, led by Robert the Crusader, Count of Flanders. He returned home with Robert of Normandy.
- The army of Hugh of Vermandois, led by Hugh the Great, Count of Vermandois, son of Henry I, King of France. Hugh returned to France (some say he fled the battlefield) prior to the conquest of Jerusalem and formed another army for the Crusade of 1101.
- The armies of Stephen of Blois, led by Stephen, Count of Blois, accompanied by Stephen I, Count of Burgundy. Stephen of Blois fled the battlefield at Antioch and returned with an army in the Crusade of 1101.

The first to leave for Constantinople was Hugh, who took a sea route, followed by Godfrey who travelled through Hungary. Bohemond's army left shortly thereafter, and then Raymond of Saint-Gilles. The armies of Robert Curthose, Stephen of Blois, and Robert II of Flanders were the last group to leave, travelling together. Altogether, there were an estimated 40,000 crusaders of which 4,500 were nobles. Runciman estimates that no more than 20% were non-combatants (families, servants, clerics), and a ratio of 1:7 of cavalry to infantry.

== Command structure ==
The command structure of the armies, including the minor armies and contingents, was dependent on the battle. Details can be found in the articles on the siege of Nicaea, the battle of Dorylaeum, the siege of Antioch, the siege of Jerusalem, and the battle of Ascalon.

== Other armies and contingents ==
Numerous other armies and contingents also participated in the First Crusade and the Crusade of 1101. These include:

- The Lombard contingent of 1101, under Anselm Buis, Archbishop of Milan. Key knights in this contingent included Caffaro di Rustico da Caschifellone and Guy II the Red of Rochefort and his brother Milo I, Lord of Montlhéry.
- The Bavarian contingent under Welf I, Duke of Bavaria, who fought in the Crusade of 1101. Historian Ekkehard of Aura accompanied Welf.
- Austrian army of Ida of Cham, the widow of Leopold II, Margrave of Austria, fighting in the Crusade of 1101.
- The contingent of Eustace III of Bologne, who travelled either with his brother, in the army of Godfrey of Bouillion or of Robert Curthose. His contingent included Hugh II of Saint-Pol and his son Engelrand, Eustace I Granarius, Lord of Sidon and Caesarea, Fulk of Guînes, and Hugh of Robecq (Rebecques), Lord of Hebron.
- The Danish army of Sweyn the Crusader. Sweyn and his wife Florine of Burgundy fielded an estimated 1,500 Danish knights in the siege of Jerusalem in 1097. The Danes were defeated, and Sweyn and his wife were killed.
- The army of William IX of Aquitaine of the Crusade of 1101, led by William IX "the Troubador", Duke of Aquitaine and Gascony, and Count of Poitou. His army was frequently defeated, William being a hapless commander, and he barely reached safety with only six survivors of his army.
- The army of William II of Nevers in the Crusade of 1101. William started out with an army of 15,000, including his brother Robert and his standard-bearer William of Nonanta. The force was decimated during the Battle of Heraclea Cybistra. Only a few knights survived the return to Antioch.
- Sigurd the Crusader, King of Norway, leader of the Norwegian Crusade (1107-1110).
- Venetian army of Ordelafo Faliero, Doge of Venice, who led a flotilla of 100 ships to support the Norwegian Crusade.
- The contingent of Guynemer of Boulogne, who commanded a fleet of Danes, Frisians and Flemings that assisted Baldwin in various campaigns.
- The army of Roger of Salerno that fought in the battle of Sarmin in 1114 and the battle of Ager Sanguinis in 1119. He died in the latter battle.
- The English fleet of Edgar Ætheling, once proclaimed King of England but never crowned. It is unclear whether Edgar was with the fleet or joined it at some later point. He is reputed to have joined the Varangian Guard of the Byzantine Empire. His only recorded companion is Robert FitzGodwin.
- Guglielmo Embriaco, known as William the Drunkard, commanded a Genoese merchant fleet that came to the assistance of the Crusaders in the aftermath of the First Crusade.
- A Lorraine force under the command of a Count Raoul, who met with and swore allegiance to the emperor. This count is discussed by Anna Comnena, daughter of the emperor, in her work Alexaid but is not mentioned elsewhere in the histories.
- The army of Bertrand of Saint-Gilles, son of Raymond IV of Toulouse and the first count of Tripoli. He was likely aligned with Baldwin in the conquest of Tripoli from William II Jordan with 1,000 knights and the support of the Genoese fleet. He was accompanied by his wife Helie of Burgundy.
- A fleet from Pisa of 120 ships took place in the First Crusade, although its role is uncertain. They did transport Dagobert, Archbishop of Pisa, to the Holy Land.
- A "great fleet of English, Danes and Flemings" travelled to the Holy Land in 1107–1108, although their objective was unclear. They apparently transported Charles I, Count of Flanders, to the Holy Land.

== Byzantine armies ==
The Byzantine Emperor Alexios I Komnenos had significant armies and navies in and about Constantinople who fought both the Turks and at times the Crusaders, especially the Normans. The major generals were Manuel Boutoumites, Tatikios Constantine Opos and Michael Aspietes. Admiral Manuel Butumites escorted the forces of Hugh the Great to Constantinople. Other admirals included John Dokas and Constantine Dalassenos. Some notable Europeans joined the emperor's armies including Welf of Burgundy, William of Grandmesnil, son of Hugh de Grandsmesnil and brother of Ivo, and Guy of Hauteville, half-brother of Bohemund. Manuel and Tatikios both participated in the siege of Nicaea. Tatikios also commanded forces in the siege of Antioch and during the Crusade of 1101.

The emperor also employed Pecheneg troops, semi-nomadic Turkics, as mercenaries. During the Crusades, the Pecheneg monitored the activities of the European Crusaders as well as participating in major battles such as the siege of Nicaea. According to Runciman, the Varangian Guard joined the fleet of Edgar Ætheling, ultimately acting under the orders of their Emperor.

== Independents ==
Numerous nobles and knights participated in the First Crusades either as independent agents or whose affiliation remain unknown. In some cases it is unclear whether they were participating in the Crusade or merely on a pilgrimage. Among the nobles whose affiliations are not known are: Charles I, Count of Flanders, who is said to have travelled with an armada in 1107 (see above); Berengar Raymond II, Count of Barcelona, who took the cross as penance for the murder of his brother; Bernard II, Count of Besalú, took the cross for the First Crusade but remained in Spain at the counseling of the pope; Fernando Díaz, one of the few Spaniards to participate in the Crusades; and Erard I, Count of Brienne, who either went on the First Crusade or on a pilgrimage to the Holy Land in 1097.

Some of the renowned knights who participated in the First Crusades whose affiliations are unknown include: Guy, Lord of Dampierre-en-Yvelines, who went to the Holy Land, but it is unclear whether he was a Crusader; Baldwin Chauderon, described as a rich man and a knight of great renown, and his compatriot Guy of Possesse (both were killed at the siege of Nicaea); and Gilduin of Le Puiset, relative of many Crusaders but whose role and affiliations in the campaigns are unclear.

Clerics who travelled to the Holy Land who were not known to be associated with any army include:

- Dagobert of Pisa (Daibert of Pisa), the first Archbishop of Pisa, and later the second Latin Patriarch of Jerusalem, replacing Arnulf of Chocques from the army of Robert Curthose. He travelled with a Pisan fleet. His follower was the cleric Morellus of Pisa.
- William of Montfort-l'Amaury, Bishop of Paris
- William, Bishop of Orange
- Odo, Bishop of Bayeux. Odo was present at the council of Clermont. When he went on crusade he was out of favor with King William II. He died in Palermo before reaching the Holy Land. Count Roger I of Sicily erected a monument to him.

== Contemporary accounts ==
- A cleric, whose name remains unknown, wrote Gesta Francorum, travelled with Bohemond.
- Fulcher of Chartres, who travelled with Stephen of Blois and wrote Fulcheri Carnotensis Historia Hierosolymitana (1095-1127).
- Peter Tudebode, a priest and author of Historia de Hierosolymitano itinere, a chronicle of the crusade as part of the army of Raymond of Saint-Gilles.
- Raymond of Aguilers, priest and chaplain to Raymond of Saint-Gilles, who wrote Historia Francorum qui ceperunt Iherusalem.

== See also ==
- Women in the Crusades
