= Historia Hierosolymitana =

Historia Hierosolymitana (Latin for "History of Jerusalem", Middle Latin spelling also Historia Iherosolimitana and variants) is the name of a number of chronicles of the crusades:

- Fulcher of Chartres, Gesta Francorum Iherusalem peregrinantium (1101–1127), also called the Historia Hierosolymitana
- Robert the Monk's Historia Hierosolymitana (early 12th century).
- Baldric of Dol's Historiae Hierosolymitanae libri IV" (1107/8)
- Albert of Aix's Historia Hierosolymitanae expeditionis (early 12th century)
- Peter Tudebode's Historia de Hierosolymitano itinere (early 12th century)
- Gilo of Toucy's Historia de via Hierosolymitana (early 12th century)
- Historia belli sacri, also called the Historia de via Hierosolymis (c. 1130)
- William of Tyre's Historia rerum in partibus transmarinis gestarum ("History of Deeds Done Beyond the Sea") also known as Historia Ierosolimitana (1184)
- Jacques de Vitry's Historia Hierosolymitana, a history of the Holy Land from the advent of Islam until the crusades of his own day, written in 1219
- Marino Sanuto the Elder's Liber Secretorum Fidelium Crucis, otherwise called Historia Hierosolymitana, written in 1307

== See also ==
- List of sources for the Crusades
