= Historia belli sacri =

Crusades saga

The Historia belli sacri, (Note: History of the Holy War) also called the Historia de via Hierosolymis (Note: History of the Road to Jerusalem) or Historia peregrinorum, (Note: History of the Pilgrims) is a chronicle of the First Crusade and the early years of the Crusader states written by an anonymous monk of the Abbey of Montecassino. It covers the years 1095–1131 and must have been mostly compiled around 1130. It is sometimes called the "Monte Cassino Chronicle" for simplicity.

The Historia belli sacri is based in large part on the equally anonymous Gesta Francorum and also incorporating fragments from the Historia Francorum qui ceperunt Iherusalem, the Gesta Tancredi and other unknown texts. Although heavily reliant on the Gesta Francorum, it is an important source for the Italo-Norman crusaders. Like the histories of Robert the Monk and Guibert of Nogent's Dei gesta per Francos, both of which were used as sources by its anonymous author, the Historia belli sacri is "a serious and careful effort to rework the Gesta story and add to it significant information which is not found in any other source." It was, after all, "written in an age when there were still survivors of the First Crusade."

There is a complete English translation.

== Manuscripts ==
For a long time the only known manuscript of the Historia belli sacri was to be found in the library of Montecassino. It was first edited by Jean Mabillon for his Museum Italicum (Paris, 1687). This edition was re-published in the Recueil des historiens des croisades (RHC) under the rubric Tudebodus imitatus et continuatus, since it was regarded by the editors as an "imitation" and "continuation" of Petrus Tudebodus' Historia de Hierosolymitano itinere. The most recent edition gives it the title Hystoria de via et recuperatione Antiochiae atque Ierusolymarum ('history of the way to and recovery of Antioch and Jerusalem').

A second fragment of the Historia belli sacri was discovered in Latin manuscript 6041 A of the Bibliothèque nationale de France. This fourteenth-century Italian manuscript once belonged to François Roger de Gaignières. The catalogue of the Bibliothèque's Latin section, published in 1774, lists the third document of MS 6041 A as " a history of Jerusalem by Pons of Baladun and Raymond, canon of Le Puy" (Pontii de Baladuno et Raimundi, canonici Podiensis, Historia Hierosolymitana). The actual third document in the MS is not only a copy of the Historia Francorum qui ceperunt Iherusalem, usually attributed to Pons of Baladun and Raymond of Aguilers, but rather a compilation, by an unknown editor, of portions of three distinct works: the Historia Francorum (for the period up to the siege of Antioch), the Historia belli sacri (for the period from there to the conquest of Ramla) and the Gesta Francorum (for the period from Ramleh to the battle of Ascalon).

== Contents ==
The Historia belli's section begins with this account of the crusaders' arrival at Antioch:

On the next day, they came as far as Antioch, at midday, on the fourth day of the week, which is the twelfth kalends of November [21 October], and miraculously we besieged the gates of the city.

Crastina autem die, pervenerunt usque ad Antiochiam, ad medietatem diei, in quarta feria, quod est duodecimo kalendas Novembris, et obsedimus mirabiliter portas civitatis.

Of the contemporary histories of the First Crusade, the Historia belli sacri provides the most information on the negotiations between the Crusaders and the Fatimid Caliphate. The Historia is also the only source to go into detail concerning Bohemond of Taranto's exceptionally long journey through the Balkans to Constantinople, which took six months with a comparatively small army, and after which he lodged in the suburb of Sancti Argenti for some time. It also records how at the beginning of the siege of Antioch, the local governor, Yaghi-Siyan, expelled the Christians from the city, and how a certain Hilary, a Muslim convert to Christianity, betrayed the Crusaders by divulging their weaknesses to the relieving army of Ridwan of Aleppo, only to be killed when the army was driven off.

Several of the Historia′s accounts are more fanciful. It places all the leaders of the Crusade at the Council of Clermont, although they were certainly not all there. It also has them begging Pope Urban II to lead them personally. It says that at the siege of Antioch a miraculous image of Christ that could not be pierced by Turkish arrows appeared in the cathedral. More credibly, it says that after the siege, the Christian women of the city went to release the imprisoned Patriarch of Antioch, John VII, only to find that he could not stand, his legs having been weakened by so long a confinement.

The chronicle ends with the death of Prince Bohemond II of Antioch.
