= Battle of the Lake of Antioch =

1098 battle during the First Crusade

- Part of the Siege of Antioch of the First Crusade
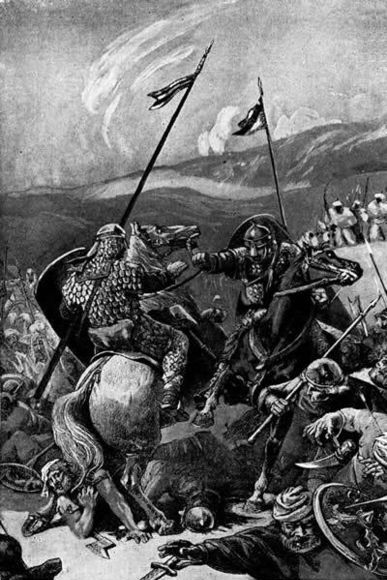
- Bohemond of Taranto in battle. 19th century impression by Gustave Doré.
Date	9 February, 1098
Location	Lake of Antioch (present-day Turkey)
Result	Crusader victory

Belligerents
Crusaders	Sultanate of Aleppo; Artuqids of Amida; Emirate of Hamah

Commanders and leaders
Bohemond of Taranto	Fakhr al-Mulk Radwan; Soqman ibn Ortoq

Strength
700 knights	~12,000 (Christian claim from Stephen of Blois and Anselm of Ribemont)

Casualties and losses
Light	Heavy, entire army routed

The Battle of the Lake of Antioch took place on 9 February 1098 during the First Crusade. As the Crusaders were besieging Antioch, word reached the Crusader camp that a large relief force led by Radwan, the Seljuq ruler of Aleppo, was on the way. Bohemond of Taranto gathered all remaining horses and marched in the night to ambush the Muslim army. After several successful cavalry charges, the Crusader knights routed the Muslim army, forcing Radwan to retreat back to Aleppo.

== Background ==
The Crusaders had begun the Siege of Antioch on 21 October 1097. They had defeated a relief force under the command of Duqaq of Damascus on 31 December 1097. The Turkish governor of Antioch Yaghi-Siyan had sent his son Shams ad-Daulah to seek assistance from local emirs. After Duqaq's defeat, he proceeded to Aleppo to ask for assistance. Fakhr al-Mulk Radwan, the Seljuq sultan of Aleppo, mustered his forces to relieve the besieged city. His major allies included the Artuqid emir Soqman ibn Ortoq and the emir of Hamah. 12th century historian Albert of Aachen suggests the army numbered 30,000 whereas the Crusaders Stephen of Blois and Anselm of Ribemont, who took part in the siege, give the more realistic figure of 12,000, which modern historians tend to agree with. Contemporary Arab sources confirm that the Aleppan army was much larger. By 8 February Radwan was stationed at Harim, about thirty-five kilometers from Antioch.

The Crusaders faced the possibility of being crushed between Antioch's garrison and Radwan's army. The leaders of the crusade decided for the first time to appoint a single commander to meet this threat. The Norman Bohemond of Taranto was elected. At this point in the siege the Crusaders had very few mounted knights at their disposal – only 700 total (many mounted on pack animals and oxen), as most of the horses had succumbed to starvation during the lengthy siege. Instead of opting for a defensive strategy centered around the Iron Bridge, which would have relied upon grinding attrition and would have been very costly in terms of manpower, Bohemond decided to go on the offensive, despite being outnumbered twelve to one. Bohemond and the knights under his command departed camp in the night under the cover of darkness, as any force crossing the Iron Bridge in daylight would have been spotted by scouts.

== Battle ==
The battle took place on a hill between the Orontes River and the Lake of Antioch according to the anonymous author of the Gesta Francorum, who was present at the battle, and the contemporary chronicler Raymond of Aguilers. Other Latin chroniclers, such as Albert of Aachen, Ralph of Caen and Peter Tudebode also give a description of the battle.

Bohemond organised the cavalry into seven squadrons, with his own held in reserve. Radwan had placed two squadrons ahead of his main force. Bohemond's decision to place his army on a small hill between the river and the lake was a risky decision, as behind him and to his left lay a marsh, and the only retreat path would be cut off if Radwan managed to break through along the road. After sending scouts to screen Radwan's movement, Bohemond's five forward units charged the two forward squadrons in the flank. The shock of the cavalry charge caused Radwan's forward squadrons to retreat and become enmeshed with the main army while it was trying to deploy. The main Turkish army managed to resist the disorder and engaged the Crusaders in fierce close quarters combat. The knights began wavering, but before the sheer mass of the Turkish army threatened to overwhelm the outnumbered knights, Bohemond recognised the crisis of the situation and unleashed his reserve, which crushed and quickly routed the disordered Turkish force. Gesta Francorum paints a vivid picture of the battle:

So Bohemond, protected on all sides by the sign of the Cross, charged the Turkish forces, like a lion which has been starving for three or four days, which comes roaring out of its cave thirsting for the blood of cattle ... His attack was so fierce that the points of his banner were flying right over the heads of the Turks. The other troops, seeing Bohemond's banner carried ahead so honourably, stopped the retreat at once, and all our men in a body charged the Turks, who were amazed and took flight. Our men pursued them and massacred them.

As the Muslim forces were thrown into a chaotic rout, the Crusaders gave chase and pursued them to Harim, killing thousands and capturing horses and supplies. The Turkish garrison at Harim torched the castle and fled east with Radwan. During the battle Yaghi-Siyan had launched a sortie against the Crusader camp which was repulsed by Raymond IV of Toulouse. Raymond of Aguilers writes of the triumph: "With the battle and booty won, we carried the heads of the slain to camp and stuck them on posts as grim reminders of the plight of their Turkish allies and of future woes of the besieged".

== Aftermath ==
Crusader casualties were light, and Bohemond's calculated risk paid off. Radwan's army disintegrated, and thousands were killed during the rout. Bohemond's generalship of a very high order allowed the Crusaders to maximize their limited resources in a risky battle. His aggressive tactics and the coherence and discipline of the Crusader army enabled it to destroy a much larger force which probably expected the Crusaders to take up a defensive position.

Historian Thomas Asbridge notes "The fate of the entire crusade had been gambled on Bohemond's ability to break the massed Aleppan ranks with a perfectly timed, crushing cavalry charge. With one bold manoeuvre he changed the course of the battle, throwing Ridwan's army into a chaotic rout." The Crusaders had successfully fended off two relief forces from Duqaq and Radwan. The arrival of an English supply fleet at St Symeon in March 1098 combined with the victory against Radwan boosted morale and enabled the Crusaders continue the siege.
