= Deus vult =

Western Christian motto associated with the Crusades

"Deus lo vult" is the motto of the Order of the Holy Sepulchre (1824).

Deus vult (Latin for 'God wills it') is a Christian motto historically tied to ideas of divine providence and individual interpretation of God's will. It was first chanted by Catholics during the First Crusade in 1096 as a rallying cry, most likely under the form Deus le veult or Deus lo vult, as reported by the Gesta Francorum (c. 1100) and the Historia Belli Sacri (c. 1130). (Note: Manuscripts of Gesta Francorum variously have Deus le volt, Deus lo vult, as well as the "corrected" forms Deus hoc vult and Deus vult. Hagenmeyer (1890) cites Barth: "Barbaro-latina vulgi exclamatio vel et tessera est. Videri autem hinc potest, tum idiotismum Francicum propiorem adhuc fuisse latine matrici".)

In modern times, the Latin motto has different meanings depending on the context. While it has been associated with nationalist ideologies in modern contexts, others interpret it as a historical expression of faith and dedication to divine purpose. It has been used as a metaphor referring to "God's will", by Christians throughout history, such as the Puritans, or as a motto by chivalric orders such as the Equestrian Order of the Holy Sepulchre of Jerusalem. In the 21st century, Christian nationalist movements, as well as Christian right, White nationalist, and far-right groups, have adopted the motto as a catchphrase. Medievalist scholars have criticized some of these usages as harmful and historically inaccurate.

== Meaning and variants ==
The phrase appears in another form in the Vulgate translation of 2 Samuel 14:14 from the Bible: nec vult Deus perire animam ("God does not want any soul to perish").

The variants Deus le volt and Deus lo vult, incorrect in Classical Latin, are forms influenced by Romance languages. According to Heinrich Hagenmeyer, the personal pronoun 'le' (or 'lo') was very likely part of the original motto as shouted during the First Crusade at Amalfi, since both the authors of the Gesta Francorum and the Historia Belli Sacri report it. Later variants include the Old French Dieux el volt and the Classical Latin Deus id vult ("God wills it") or Deus hoc vult ("God wills this").

== History ==
=== First Crusade ===
The battle cry of the First Crusade is first reported in the Gesta Francorum, a chronicle written c. 1100 by an anonymous author associated with Bohemond I of Antioch shortly after the successful campaign. According to this account, while the Princes' Crusade were gathered in Amalfi in the late summer of 1096, a large number of armed crusaders bearing the sign of the cross on their right shoulders or on their backs cried in unison "Deus le volt, Deus le volt, Deus le volt". Medieval historian Guibert de Nogent mentions that "Deus le volt" has been retained by the pilgrims to the detriment of other cries.

The Historia belli sacri, written later c. 1131, also cites the battle cry. It is again mentioned in the context of the capture of Antioch on 3 June 1098. The anonymous author of the Gesta was himself among the soldiers capturing the wall towers, and recounts that "seeing that they were already in the towers, they began to shout Deus le volt with glad voices; so indeed did we shout".

=== Robert the Monk ===
Robert the Monk, who re-wrote the Gesta Francorum c. 1120, added an account of the speech of Pope Urban II at the Council of Clermont in 1095, of which he was an eyewitness. The speech climaxes in Urban's call for orthodoxy, reform, and submission to the Church. Robert records that the pope asked Western Christians, poor and rich, to come to the aid of the Greeks in the East:

When Pope Urban had said these and very many similar things in his urbane discourse, he so influenced to one purpose the desires of all who were present, that they cried out, 'It is the will of God! It is the will of God!' When the venerable Roman pontiff heard that, with eyes uplifted to heaven he gave thanks to God and, with his hand commanding silence, said: Most beloved brethren, today is manifest in you what the Lord says in the Gospel, "Where two or three are gathered together in my name there am I in the midst of them." Unless the Lord God had been present in your spirits, all of you would not have uttered the same cry. For, although the cry issued from numerous mouths, yet the origin of the cry was one. Therefore I say to you that God, who implanted this in your breasts, has drawn it forth from you. Let this then be your war-cry in combats, because this word is given to you by God. When an armed attack is made upon the enemy, let this one cry be raised by all the soldiers of God: It is the will of God! It is the will of God!

Robert also reports that the cry of Deus lo vult was at first shouted in jest by the soldiers of Bohemond during their combat exercises, and later turned into an actual battle cry, which Bohemond interpreted as a divine sign.

Tyerman, writing in 2006, suggests that the cheering at Urban's speech was "probably led by a papal claque".

== Modern usage ==
Deus lo vult is the motto of the Equestrian Order of the Holy Sepulchre of Jerusalem, a Roman Catholic order of chivalry (restored 1824).

Admiral Alfred Thayer Mahan (1840–1914), a Protestant Episcopalian, used the expression for his argument of the dominion of Christ as "essentially imperial" and that Christianity and warfare had a great deal in common: "'Deus vult!' say I. It was the cry of the Crusaders and of the Puritans and I doubt if man ever uttered a nobler [one]."

When Adolf Hitler staged the Munich Beer Hall Putsch in November 1923, Houston Stewart Chamberlain wrote an essay for the Völkischer Beobachter entitled "God Wills It!" calling on all Germans who love Germany to join the putsch.

The 1st CCNN Division "Dio lo Vuole" ("God wills it") was one of the three Italian Blackshirts Divisions sent to Spain in 1937 during the Spanish Civil War to make up the "Corpo Truppe Volontarie" (Corps of Volunteer Troops), or CTV.

In 1947, Canadian prelate George Flahiff used the expression Deus Non Vult as the title of an examination of the gradual loss of enthusiasm for the crusades at the end of the 12th century, specifically of the early criticism of the crusades by Ralph Niger, writing in 1189.

=== Adoption by 21st-century Christian nationalists and right-wing groups ===
Deus vult has been adopted as a slogan by a variety of Christian right and Christian nationalist groups, This usage was disseminated widely online, through hashtags and internet memes. Crusader memes (such as an image of a Knight Templar accompanied by the caption "I'll see your jihad and raise you one crusade") are popular.

== See also ==
- Ad maiorem Dei gloriam – "For the greater glory of God"
- Allāhu akbar – "God is [the] greatest"
- Be'ezrat Hashem – "With the help of Heaven"
- Churches Militant, Penitent, and Triumphant – Traditional divisions of the Christian Church
- Deo volente – "God willing"
- Divine retribution – Supernatural punishment by a deity
- God works in mysterious ways – Christian hymn, written in 1773 by William Cowper from England
- In hoc signo vinces – "In this sign, you will conquer"
- Inshallah – "If God wills," and Mashallah, "what God has willed"
- Jai Shri Ram – Hindu expression, translating as "Glory to Lord Rama"
- Just war theory – Doctrine about when a war is ethically just
- Muscular Christianity – Socioreligious movement
- Palästinalied – A Christian hymn sung by Crusaders
- Will of God – Religious concept of God and creation

== Bibliography ==
- B. Lacroix, "Deus le volt!: la théologie d'un cri", Études de civilisation médiévale (IXe-XIIe siècles). Mélanges offerts à Edmond-René Labande, Poitiers (1974), 461–470.
