= Battle of Dorylaeum (1097) =

Early battle during the First Crusade

Coordinates: 39.7767°N 30.5206°E

Battle of Dorylaion
- Part of the First Crusade
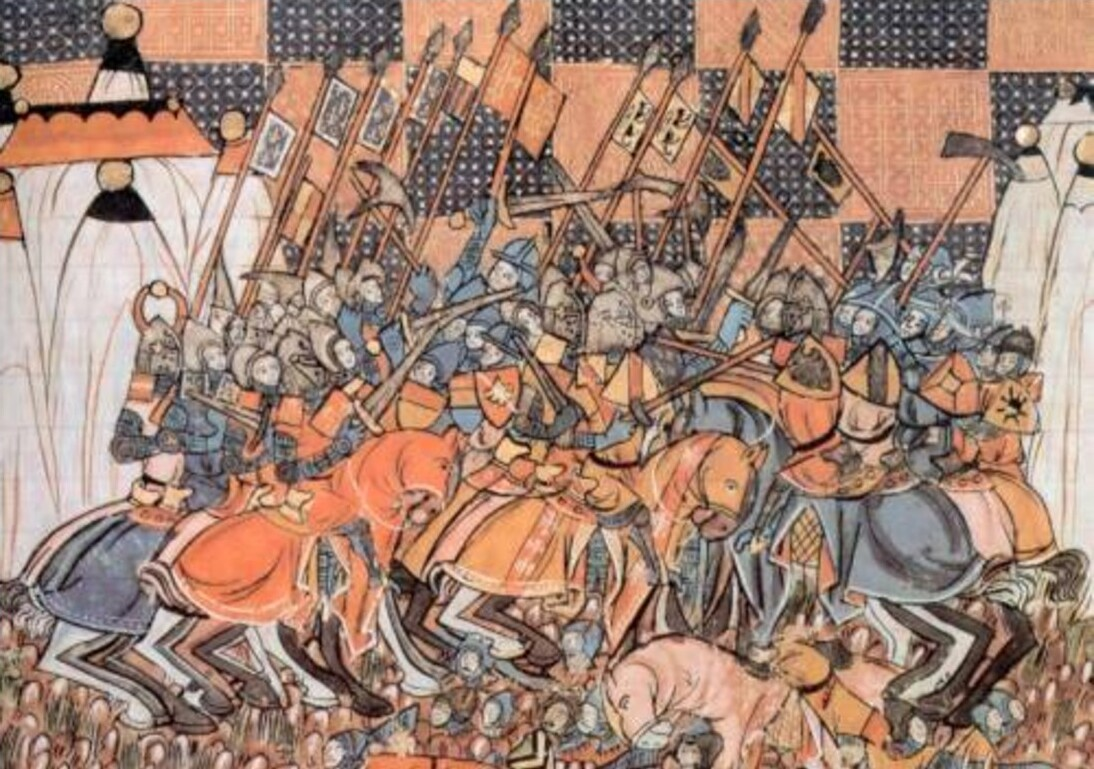
- La bataille de Dorylée, 1330–1340 French work
Date	1 July 1097
Location	Dorylaion (near modern Eskişehir, Turkey)
Result	Crusader victory

Belligerents
Crusaders	Sultanate of Rûm; Danishmendids

Commanders and leaders
Bohemond of Taranto; Robert Curthose	Kilij Arslan; Gazi Gümüshtigin

Strength
20,000	6–7,000

Casualties and losses
4,000	3,000

The Battle of Dorylaion or Dorylaeum took place during the First Crusade on 1 July 1097 between the crusader forces and the Seljuk Turks, near the city of Dorylaion in Anatolia. Though the Turkish forces of Kilij Arslan nearly wiped out the Crusader contingent of Bohemond of Taranto, other Crusaders arrived just in time to reverse the course of the battle.

== Background ==
Anatolia in 1097, before the Siege of Nicaea and the Battle of Dorylaeum

The crusaders had left Nicaea on 26 June 1097, with a deep distrust of the Byzantines, who had taken the city without their knowledge after the lengthy siege of Nicaea. In order to simplify the problem of supplies, the Crusader army had split into two groups: the weaker led by Bohemond of Taranto, his nephew Tancred, Robert Curthose, Robert of Flanders, and the Byzantine general Tatikios in the vanguard; and Godfrey of Bouillon, his brother Baldwin of Boulogne, Raymond IV of Toulouse, Stephen II of Blois, and Hugh of Vermandois in the rear.

The Crusader army vanguard under Bohemond, Robert of Normandy and Stephen of Blois numbered c. 20,000. There was a gap of c. 5 km to the main force of c. 30,000. Bohemond's force probably numbered about 10,000 (not counting a large number of non-combatants), the majority on foot. Military figures of the time often imply perhaps several men-at-arms, spearmen, archers or crossbowmen per knight (i.e., a stated force of 500 knights is assumed to contain an additional 1,500 soldiers), so it seems reasonable that Bohemond had with him approximately 2,000 cavalry and 8,000 foot soldiers.

The Turk force numbered 6–7,000 cavalry, including Danishmendid troops, under Kilij Arslan and his ally Gazi Gümüshtigin. However, several sources give much higher Turkish numbers: 150,000 men according to Raymond of Aguilers and 360,000 men reported by Fulcher of Chartres, neither of which are considered possible by modern historians due to the lack of supplies for so many men and horses, and the Turkish use of hit-and-run horse archer tactics, indicating a smaller army.

On 29 June, Bohemond noticed that the Turks were planning an ambush near Dorylaion, having seen scouts following them. On the evening of 30 June, after a three-day march, Bohemond's army made camp in a meadow on the north bank of the river Thymbres, near the ruined town of Dorylaion, believed to be the site of the modern city of Eskişehir.

== Battle ==
On 1 July, Bohemond's force was surrounded outside Dorylaion by Kilij Arslan. Godfrey of Bouillon and Raymond had separated from the vanguard, and the Turk army attacked at dawn, taking Bohemond's army (not expecting such a swift attack) entirely by surprise, shooting arrows into the camp. Bohemond's knights had quickly mounted, but their sporadic counterattacks were unable to deter the Turks. The Turks were riding into camp, cutting down noncombatants and unarmoured foot soldiers, who were unable to outrun the Turkish horses and were too disoriented and panic-stricken to form lines of battle. To protect the unarmoured foot and noncombatants, Bohemond ordered his knights to dismount and form a defensive line, and with some trouble gathered the foot soldiers and the noncombatants into the centre of the camp; the women acted as water-carriers throughout the battle. While this formed a battle line and sheltered the more vulnerable men-at-arms and noncombatants, it also gave the Turks free rein to maneuver on the battlefield.

The Turk mounted archers attacked in their usual style – charging in, shooting their arrows, and quickly retreating before the Crusaders could counterattack. The archers did little damage to the heavily armoured knights but inflicted heavy casualties on their horses and on the unarmoured foot soldiers. Bohemond had sent messengers to the other Crusader army and now struggled to hold on until help arrived, and his army was being forced back to the bank of the Thymbres. The marshy riverbank protected the Crusaders from mounted charge, as the ground was too soft for horses, and the armoured knights formed a circle protecting the foot soldiers and noncombatants from arrows, but the Turks kept their archers constantly supplied and the sheer number of arrows was taking its toll, reportedly more than 2,000 falling to horse-archers. Bohemond's knights were impetuous: although ordered to stand ground, small groups of knights would periodically break ranks and charge, only to be slaughtered or forced back as the Turkish horses fell back beyond range of their swords and arrows, while still shooting at them with arrows, killing many of the knights' horses out from under them. And although the knights' armour protected them well (the Turks called them 'men of iron') the sheer number of arrows meant that some would find unprotected spots and eventually, after so many hits, a knight would collapse from his wounds.

Just after midday, Godfrey arrived with a force of 50 knights, fighting through the Turk lines to reinforce Bohemond. Through the day small groups of reinforcements (also from Raymond, and Hugh, as well as Godfrey) arrived, some killed by the Turks, others fighting to reach Bohemond's camp. As the Crusader losses mounted, the Turks became more aggressive, and the Crusader army found itself forced from the marshy banks of the river into the shallows. But the Crusaders held on, and after approximately 7 hours of battle, Raymond's knights arrived (it is unclear if Raymond was with them, or if they arrived ahead of Raymond), launching a vicious surprise attack across the Turkish flank that turned them back in disarray and allowed the Crusaders to rally.

The Crusaders had formed a line of battle with Bohemond, Tancred, Robert Curthose, and Stephen on the left wing, Raymond, Robert II in the center and Godfrey and Hugh on the right, and they rallied against the Turks, proclaiming "hodie omnes divites si Deo placet effecti eritis" ("today if it pleases God you will all become rich"). Although the ferocity of the Crusader attack took the Turks by surprise, they were unable to dislodge the Turks until a force led by Bishop Adhemar of Le Puy, the papal legate, arrived in mid-afternoon, perhaps with Raymond in the van, moving around the battle through concealing hills and across the river, outflanking the archers on the left and surprising the Turks from the rear. Adhemar's force fell on the Turkish camp, and attacked the Turks from the rear. The Turks were terrified by the sight of their camp in flames and by the ferocity and endurance of the knights, since the knights' armour protected them from arrows and even many sword cuts, and they promptly fled, abandoning their camp and forcing Kilij Arslan to withdraw from the battlefield.

Albert of Aix claimed 4,000 Crusader and 3,000 Turk casualties.

== Aftermath ==
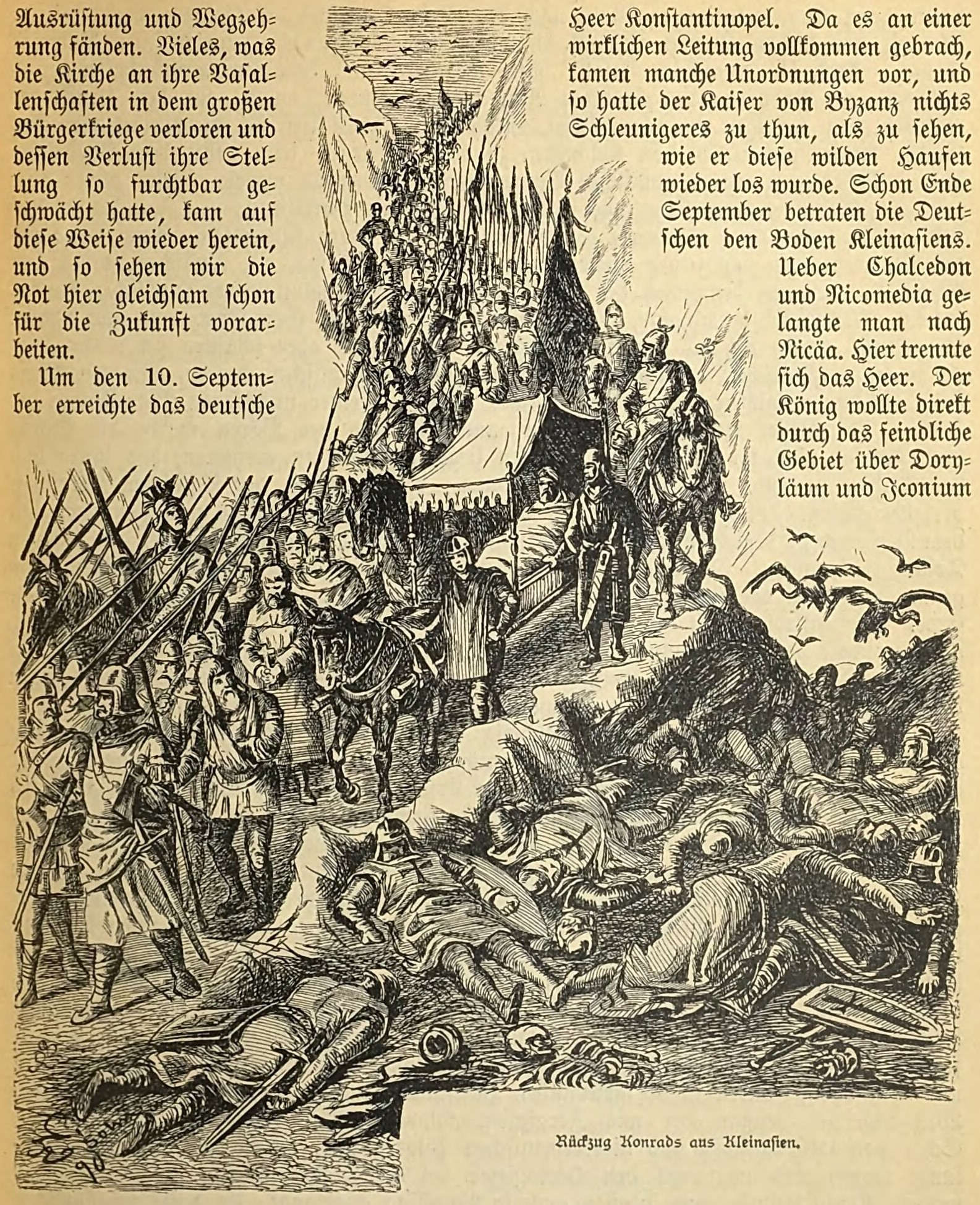
"The retreat of Conrad to Asia Minor" (1891).

The Crusaders did indeed become rich, at least for a short time, after capturing Arslan's treasury. The Turks fled, and Arslan turned to other concerns in his eastern territory. Arslan punitively took the male Greek children from the region extending from Dorylaeum to Iconium, sending many as slaves to Persia. The Crusaders were allowed to march virtually unopposed through Anatolia on their way to Antioch. It took almost three months to cross Anatolia in the heat of the summer, and in October they began the Siege of Antioch.

With the Crusader army moved onwards towards Antioch, Emperor Alexios I Komnenos achieved part of his original intent in inviting the Crusaders in the first place: the recovery of Seljuk-held imperial territories in Asia Minor. John Doukas re-established Byzantine rule in Chios, Rhodes, Smyrna, Ephesus, Sardis, and Philadelphia in 1097–1099. This success is ascribed by Alexios' daughter Anna to his policy and diplomacy, but by the Latin historians of the crusade to his treachery and falseness. The Gesta Francorum praises the Turkish army's bravery and superhuman efforts at Dorylaeum. It states "Had the Turks been Christian, they would have been the finest of races."

== Sources ==
Primary

- Albert of Aix, Historia Hierosolymitana
- Fulcher of Chartres, Historia Hierosolymitana
- Gesta Francorum
- Raymond of Aguilers, Historia francorum qui ceperunt Jerusalem

Secondary

- Bachrach, Bernard S. "The Crusader March from Dorylaion to Herakleia, 4 July–ca. 2 September 1097." Shipping, Trade and Crusade in the Medieval Mediterranean. Routledge, 2016. 231-254.
- Roche, Jason T. "Conrad III and the Second Crusade: Retreat from Dorylaion?." Crusades 5.1 (2006): 85-97.
- Roche, Jason T. "Roads, Bridges and Modelling the Movement of the First Crusade in Anatolia (1097)." Territories and Boundaries. Brepols Online, 2026. 221-225.
- Runciman, Steven (1951). A History of the Crusades, Volume I: The First Crusade and the Foundation of the Kingdom of Jerusalem. Cambridge: Cambridge University Press.
- Setton, Kenneth M.; Baldwin, Marshall W., eds. (1969) [1955]. A History of the Crusades, Volume I: The First Hundred Years. Vol. 1 (Second ed.). Madison, Milwaukee, and London: University of Wisconsin Press. ISBN 0-299-04834-9.
- John France, Victory in the East: A Military History of the First Crusade, Cambridge University Press, 1996.
- France, John (2005). The Crusades And The Expansion Of Catholic Christendom, 1000–1714. Routledge.
- Vryonis, Speros Jr. (1971). The decline of medieval Hellenism in Asia Minor and the process of Islamization from the eleventh through the fifteenth century. Berkeley: University of California Press. ISBN 9780520015975.
