= Recueil des historiens des croisades =

The Recueil des historiens des croisades (trans: Collection of the Historians of the Crusades) is a major collection of several thousand medieval documents written during the Crusades. The documents were collected and published in Paris in the 19th century, and include documents in Latin, Greek, Arabic, Old French, and Armenian. The documents cover the entire period of the Crusades, and are frequently cited in scholarly works, as a way of locating a specific document. When being quoted in citations, the collection is often abbreviated as RHC or R.H.C..

Images of the documents can be viewed in some major libraries. The 1967 reprint of the entire collection by Gregg Press can also be found in major libraries, and there are also full-text PDF files available online, which have been made available by the Bibliothèque Nationale de France Gallica project. Documents can be downloaded in their entirety, or stepped through page by page, with both the original text, and a French translation.

== Presentation ==
According to the introductory Report to the first volume of the Western Historians, this collection brings up to date the previous collection published in 1611 by Jacques Bongars under the title Gesta Dei per Francos, due to "the discovery of many literary and historical monuments which Bongars could not have suspected the existence", including those published in the collections of Duchesne, Archery, Mabillon, Martène and many other foreign compilers.

The editors of this collection have chosen to consider 1291 as the end date of the Crusades, since the fall of Saint-Jean-d'Acre completed the ruin of Christian institutions in Palestine. So historians posterior to the middle of the fourteenth century are not included. Were also excluded works more literary than historical, like novels on the Crusades, and also the narration related to the conquest of Constantinople by the French and the Venetians, because they did take almost no part in the events of Palestine. Neither was included Joinville's Histoire, because the commission of the Académie des inscriptions et belles-lettres did class this author among France's general historians.

== Contents ==
The RHC is divided into five series:

- Lois ("RHC Lois"; the Assizes of Jerusalem)
- Historiens occidentaux ("RHC Oc" or "RHC Occ"; Western European texts in Latin and Old French)
- Historiens orientaux ("RHC Or"; Arabic texts)
- Historiens grecs ("RHC Grec"; Greek texts)
- Historiens arméniens ("RHC Arm"; Armenian texts)

=== Lois (1841–1843) ===
Full title: Assises de Jérusalem ou Recueil des ouvrages de jurisprudence composés pendant le XIIIe siècle dans les royaumes de Jérusalem et de Chypre, par M. Le Comte Beugnot

==== Volume 1 ====
Introduction to the Assizes of the Haute Cour (by Beugnot)

- I. Livre de Jean d'Ibelin
- II. Livre de Geoffroy le Tort
- III. Livre de Jacques d'Ibelin
- IV. Livre de Philippe de Navarre
- V. La Clef des Assises de la Haute Cour du royaume de Jérusalem et de Chypre
- VI. Le Livre au Roi

Table des matières

==== Volume 2 ====
Introduction to the Assizes of the Cour des Bourgeois (by Beugnot)

- I. Livre des Assises de la Cour des Bourgeois
- II. Abrégé du Livre des Assises de la Cour des Bourgeois
- III. Bans et Ordonnances des rois de Chypre
- IV. Formules

Appendix

- I. Documents relatifs à la successibilité au trône et à la régence
- II. Document relatif au service militaire
- III. Les Lignages d'Outremer
- IV. Charters

Glossary

Table of contents.

=== Historiens occidentaux (1844–1895) ===
==== Volume 1 (1844) ====
First part

- Report on the publication of the Recueil des historiens des croisades
- Preface
- Notice on the general map of the theatre of the crusades
- William of Tyre's Chronique, Historia rerum in partibus transmarinis gestarum, in Latin, up to book 23

Second part (p. 703)

- William of Tyre's Chronique, Historia rerum in partibus transmarinis gestarum, in Latin, Rest
- Ernoul's Chronique, L’estoire de Eracles empereur, translation in old French of the former
- Variantes Lectiones
- Index Generalis

==== Volume 2 (1859) ====
- Preface
- Description of the manuscripts
- Table of contents of the second volume
- Corrections and additions
- L'estoire de eracles émpereur (continuation; in Old French) Book 23 to 34
- Continuation of William of Tyre from the so-called "Rothelin manuscript"
- Chronological analysis of William of Tyre and his continuators
- Glossary
- Table

==== Volume 3 (1866) ====
Preface

- I. Petri Tudebodi seu Tudebovis, sacerdotis Sivracensis, historia de Hierosolymitano itinere
- II. Gesta Francorum et aliorum Hierosolymitanorum, seu Tudebodus abbreviatus (Expeditio contra Turcos)
- III. Tudebodus imitatus et continuatus, ex codice bibliothecae casinensis qui inscribitur, Historia peregrinorum euntium Jerusolymam ad liberandum Sanctum Sepulcrum de potestate ethnicorum, et a cl. Viro Mabillone editus est in Musaeo italico
- IV. Raimundi de Aguilers, canonici Podiensis, historia Francorum qui ceperunt Iherusalem
- V. Historia Iherosolymitana. Gesta Francorum Iherusalem peregrinantium, ab anno Domini MXCV usque ad annum MCXXVII, auctore domno Fulcherio Carnotensi
- VI. Gesta Francorum Iherusalem expugnantium
- VII. Secunda pars historiae Iherosolimitanae
- VIII. Gesta Tancredi in expeditione Hierosolymitana, auctore Rudolfo Cadomensi, ejus familiari
- IX. Roberti Monachi historia Iherosolimitana
- X. Stephani, comitis Carnotensis, atque Anselmi de Ribodi Monte epistolae
- Index generalis quo nomina quae ad res, locos et homines pertinent, comprehenduntur

==== Volume 4 (1879) ====
Preface

- I. Baldrici, episcopi Dolensis, Historia Jerosolimitana
- II. Historia quae dicitur Gesta Dei per Francos, edita a venerabili Domno Guiberto, abbate monasterii Sanctae Mariae Novigenti
- III. Alberti Aquensis Historia Hierosolymitana
- Index generalis quo nomina quae ad res locos, homines, pertinent, comprehenduntur

==== Volume 5 (1895) ====
Preface

- I. Ekkehardi abbatis Uraugiensis Hierosolymita
- II. Cafari de Caschifelone, Genuensis, De libertatione civitatum Orientis
- III. Galterii, cancellarii Antiocheni, Bella Antiochena, 1114–1119
- IV. Balduini III Historia Nicaena vel Antiochena
- V. Theodori Palidensis Narratio profectionis Godefridi ducis ad Jerusalem
- VI. Passiones beati Thiemonis
- VII. Documenta Lipsanographica ad I. bellum sacrum spectantia
- VIII. Primi belli sacri Narrationes minores
- IX. Exordium Hospitalariorum
- X. Historia Gotfridi
- XI. Benedicti de Accoltis, Aretini, Historia Gotefridi
- XII. Li Estoire de Jerusalem et d’Antioche
- XIII. Itinerario di la gran militia, a la pavese
- XIV. Fulco. Gilo
- Index generalis

=== Historiens orientaux (1872–1906) ===
==== Volume 1 (1872) ====
- Introduction
- Summary of the history of the Crusades, taken from the Concise History of Humanity of Abu'l-Feda (Arabic/French)
- Autobiography of Abu'l-Feda, extract from his chronicle
- Extract from The Complete History by ibn Athir (Arabic/French)
- Appendix
- Notes and corrections

==== Volume 2, part 1 (1887) ====
Advertisement

- Extract from The Complete History by ibn Athir (continuation) (Arabic/French)
- Extracts from The Necklace of Pearls by Badr al-Din al-Ayni (Arabic/French)
- List of chapters from the extract of The Complete History by ibn Athir
- Index

==== Volume 2, part 2 (1876) ====
- History of the Atabegs of Mosul by ibn Athir (Arabic/French)
- List of chapters
- Index

==== Volume 3 (1884) ====
- Anecdotes and good habits of the life of the Sultan Youssof (Saladin) of Abu’l-Mahāsin (Arabic/French)
- Notice on Beha Ed-Din Abou’L-Mehacen Ibn Cheddad, Extract from the Dictionary of Ibn Khallican (Arabic/French)
- Extracts from the Autobiography of Abd al-Latif (Arabic/French)
- Voyage by ibn Jubayr (Arabic/French)
- Extracts from ibn Muyessar (Arabic/French)
- Extracts from the Nodjoum az-Zahireh of Abu’l-Mahāsin (Arabic/French)
- Extracts from the Mirat az-Zeman of Sibt ibn al-Jawzi (Arabic/French)
- Extracts from the Chronicle of Aleppo by Kamal ad-Din (Arabic/French)
- Extracts from the biographical dictionary of Kamal ad-Din (Arabic/French)

==== Volume 4 (1898) ====
- The Book of the Two Gardens, History of the Two Kingdoms, that of Nur ad-Din and that of Saladin (13 June 1146 – 29 January 1191), by Abu Shama (Arabic/French)
- Tables des Matières
- Publications

==== Volume 5 (1906) ====
- The Book of the Two Gardens, History of the Two Kingdoms, that of Nur ad-Din and that of Saladin (continuation)
- Index

=== Historiens grecs (1875–1881) ===
==== Volume 1 (1875) ====
- Preface
- Variantes lectiones e codice Florentino
- I. Scriptores Graeci Bellorum a Francis dei signa sequentibus in Syria susceptorum (Michael Attaliata, Psellus), Annotationes Historiae et philologicae ad partem primam
- II. Scriptores Graeci Bellorum a Francis dei signa sequentibus in Syria Susceptorum. Pars secunda (Anna Comnena)
- III. Scriptores Graeci Bellorum a Francis dei signa sequentibus in Syria Susceptorum. Pars tertia. Transitio. (Cinnamus, Nicetas)
- IV. Scriptores Graeci Bellorum a Francis dei signa sequentibus in Syria Susceptorum. Pars quarta (Nicetas)
- V. Scriptores Graeci Bellorum a Francis dei signa sequentibus in Syria Susceptorum. Pars quinta. (Nicephorus Gregoras, Ioannes Phocas, Neophytus, Georgius Agropolita De Syria Expugnata. (Ephraemius)
- Addenda et corrigenda

==== Volume 2 (1881) ====
- Preface
- Scriptores Graeci Bellorum a Francis dei signa sequentibus in Syria Susceptorum. Adnotationes Historicae et philologicae ad partem secundum.
- Scriptores Graeci Bellorum a Francis dei signa sequentibus in Syria Susceptorum. Adnotationes Historicae et philologicae ad partem tertiam.
- Scriptores Graeci Bellorum a Francis dei signa sequentibus in Syria Susceptorum. Adnotationes Historicae et philologicae ad partem
- Scriptores Graeci Bellorum a Francis dei signa sequentibus in Syria Susceptorum. Adnotationes Historicae et philologicae ad partem quintam.
- Scriptores Graeci Bellorum a Francis dei signa sequentibus in Syria Susceptorum. Appendix (Theodore Prodromos)
- Index Graecitatis
- Addenda et corrigenda

=== Documents arméniens (1869–1906) ===
==== Volume 1 (1869) ====
- Preface
- Introduction
- Chap. I. Physical geography, considered together with political geography
- Chap. II. The Kingdom of Lesser Armenia from the historical point of view
- Chap. III. Commerce, customs tariffs, and civil condition of foreigners in Lesser Armenia
- Genealogical and dynastic tables
- Chronicle of Matthew of Edessa
- Chronique de Grégoire le Prètre of Gregory the Priest
- Oraison Funèbre de Baudouin by Basil the Doctor
- Elégie sur la Prise d’Edessa by Catholicos Nerses Shnorhali
- Elégie sur la Prise de Jérusalem by Catholicos Gregory Dgh'a, successor to Nerses
- Chronicle of Michael the Syrian
- Guiragos of Kantzag
- Vartan the Great
- Samuel of Ani
- Hethoum the historian, count of Gorigos
- Bahram of Edessa
- Popular song on the captivity of Leo
- Hetoum II of Armenia
- Saint Nerses of Lambron
- Sempad the Constable
- Mardiros (Martyr) of Crimea
- Doctor Mekhithar of Dashir
- Appendis
- Armenian charters
- Index

==== Volume 2 (1906) ====
Preface

- I. Chronicle of Armenia (Jean Dardel)
- II. La Flor des Estoires des parties d’Orient. Livre I.-IV. (Hayton)
- III. Directorium ad passagium faciendum. (Brocardus)
- IV. De modo saracenos extirpandi (Guillaume Adam)
- V. Responsio ad errores impositos Hermenis (Daniel de Thaurisio)
- VI. Les gestes des Chiprois. Livre I.-III.
- Index
- Additions and corrections
