= Historia Francorum qui ceperunt Iherusalem =

History of the Franks
- Author: Raymond of Aguilers
- Original title: Historia Francorum qui ceperunt Iherusalem
- Translator: John H. and Laurita L. Hill (English); François Guizot (French)
- Language: Latin
- Subject: First Crusade
- Genre: chronicle
- Publication date: 1098×1105
- Publication place: Kingdom of Jerusalem
- Pages: ~100 in manuscript

The Historia Francorum qui ceperunt Iherusalem (Ecclesiastical Latin: [isˈtɔː.ri.a ˈfraŋ.kɔ.rum kwi ˈt͡ʃɛː.pɛ.runt i.ɛˈruː.za.lɛm]; "History of the Franks who captured Jerusalem"), which has also been published under the simple title Liber ("Book"), is a Latin chronicle of the First Crusade written between 1098 and 1105, probably completed by 1101, by Pons of Balazun and Raymond of Aguilers.

Pons was a knight who died during the crusade in the spring of 1099. Raymond was the chaplain of Count Raymond IV of Toulouse. Although the work is attributed to both of them, it seems that Pons did little beyond encouraging Raymond to begin writing before his death. The finished work is basically that of Raymond's. As an eyewitness of the events of the First Crusade, he is one of its most important chroniclers, comparable in importance to the Gesta Francorum and Fulcher of Chartres.

The Historia Francorum was probably written during the crusade. It presumed to have been completed before 1105, because it does not mention the death of Raymond's patron, the count of Toulouse, in that year. Probably it was substantially complete by 1101, since it was certainly used by Fulcher of Chartres for his book, finished in that year. The Historia makes some limited use of the Gesta Francorum, but it is in the main a firsthand account with a completely different focus from the Gesta. Because he was close to the count, Raymond was better informed regarding the inner workings of the crusader leadership than the author of the Gesta.

The Historia Francorum was one of the texts given to King Louis VII of France as a coronation gift in 1137. Besides Fulcher, the author of the Historia belli sacri and William of Tyre also used it as a source.

Seven manuscripts of the Historia survive: three from the 12th century, two from the 13th and one each from the 14th and 15th. In most cases, it was bound in a codex alongside the works of Fulcher and Walter the Chancellor.

== Editions ==
The Historia Francorum was translated into modern French at the beginning of the 19th century by the French scholar François Guizot, in Memoires sur l'histoire de France XXI (1824), 227–397. The Latin text was first published by Jacques Bongars in Gesta Dei per Francos, I, pp. 139–183, and again in the Recueil des historiens occidentaux des croisades (1866), pp. 235–309. The most recent translation into English was provided by John and Laurita Hill in 1968:

- Raymond d'Aguilers, Historia Francorum qui ceperunt Iherusalem tr. John Hugh Hill, Laurita L. Hill. Philadelphia: American Philosophical Society, 1968.
