= Eustace III =

Eustace III may refer to:

- Eustace III, Count of Boulogne (r. 1087–1125)
- Eustace III of Grammene (died 1236), chamberlain of Flanders
