= Marcus Bull =

British historian (b. 1962)

Marcus Graham Bull
- Born: 1962 (age 63–64)
- Citizenship: UK
- Education: University of London
- Scientific career
- Workplaces: University of North Carolina at Chapel Hill; University of Bristol; University of London
- Thesis: Knightly Piety in South-Western France c.970-c.1130 and the Lay Response to the First Crusade
- Doctoral advisor: J. S. C. Riley-Smith

Marcus Graham Bull, FRHistS (/bʊl/; born 1962), is a British historian and religious scholar who is the Andrew W. Mellon Distinguished Professor of Mediaeval and Early Modern Studies at the University of North Carolina at Chapel Hill.

== Career ==
Bull graduated from the University of London (B.A. in 1987 and Ph.D. in 1991). His thesis supervisor was Jonathan Riley-Smith. Later he worked at the Department of History of Royal Holloway and Bedford New College of the University of London (1991–1993) and the University of Bristol (Department of Historical Studies from 1993 to 2008 and the School of Humanities from 2008 to 2010). From 2010 he is the Andrew W. Mellon Distinguished Professor of Mediaeval and Early Modern Studies at the University of North Carolina at Chapel Hill.

Bull primarily focused his research in the narratology of historical texts. He is an author of numerous books about the Crusades and the history of Christianity. He is one of the leading proponents of the ideas for considering the literary and cultural heritage of the Crusades. Bull is a 'highly respected specialist on the crusades'. His most recent book Eyewitness and Crusade Narrative published in 2018. According to historian John France 'this is a stimulating book, but the methodology, while useful in the hands of a historian as learned as Bull, has grave risks'.

== Selected publications ==
- Bull, Marcus (1993). Knightly Piety and the Lay Response to the First Crusade: the Limousin and Gascony, c. 970-c. 1130. Oxford University Press Academic Monograph Reprints Series. Oxford: Clarendon Press. ISBN 978-0-198-20354-4 – via the Internet Archive.
- Bull, Marcus (1999). The Miracles of Our Lady of Rocamadour: Analysis and Translation. Woodbridge: Boydell Press. doi:10.1017/9780585163796. ISBN 978-0-851-15765-8. JSTOR j.ctv136c266 – via Google Books.
- Bull, Marcus, ed. (2002). France in the Central Middle Ages 900–1200. The Short Oxford History of France. Vol. 1. Oxford: Oxford University Press. ISBN 978-0-198-73184-9 – via the Internet Archive.
- Bull, Marcus; Housley, Norman, eds. (2003). The Experience of Crusading: Western Approaches. Presented to Jonathan Riley-Smith on his 65th Birthday. Western Approaches Series. Vol. 1. Cambridge: Cambridge University Press. ISBN 978-0-521-81168-2 – via the Internet Archive.
- Bull, Marcus; Edbury, Peter W.; Housley, Norman; Phillips, Jonathan, eds. (2003). The Experience of Crusading. Defining the Crusader Kingdom Series. Vol. 2. Cambridge: Cambridge University Press. ISBN 978-0-521-78151-0 – via Google Books.
- Bull, Marcus; Léglu, Catherine, eds. (2005). The World of Eleanor of Aquitaine: Literature and Society in Southern France Between the Eleventh and Thirteenth Centuries. Woodbridge: Boydell Press. ISBN 978-1-843-83114-3 – via Google Books.
- Bull, Marcus (2005). Thinking Medieval: An Introduction to the Study of the Middle Ages. Palgrave History Collection. Basingstoke: Palgrave Macmillan. doi:10.1057/9780230501577. ISBN 978-1-4039-1294-7 – via the Internet Archive.
- Bull, Marcus (2009). "Crusade and conquest". In Rubin, Miri; Simons, Walter (eds.). The Cambridge History of Christianity. Vol. 4. Cambridge University Press. pp. 340–352. doi:10.1017/CHOL9780521811064. ISBN 978-1-139-05602-1.
- Bull, Marcus; String, Tatiana C. (2011). Tudorism: Historical Imagination and the Appropriation of the Sixteenth Century. Proceedings of the British Academy. London: British Academy/OUP. ISBN 978-0-197-26494-2.
- Robert the Monk [in French] (2013). Bull, Marcus (ed.). The Historia Iherosolimitana of Robert the Monk. Translated by Marcus Bull. Woodbridge: Boydell Press. ISBN 978-1-84383-808-1.
- Bull, Marcus; Kempf, Damien, eds. (2014). Writing the Early Crusades: Text, Transmission and Memory. Woodbridge: Boydell & Brewer, Ltd. ISBN 978-1-843-83920-0. JSTOR j.ctt5vj7k3 – via Google Books.
- Bull, Marcus (2018). Eyewitness and Crusade Narrative: Perception and Narration in Accounts of the Second, Third and Fourth Crusades. Crusading in Context. Vol. 1. Woodbridge: Boydell & Brewer, Ltd. doi:10.1515/9781787443433. ISBN 978-1-783-27335-5.
