= Guynemer of Boulogne =

11th-century Boulognese pirate

Guynemer was a Boulognese pirate who played a role in the First Crusade.

== Biography ==
He assembled a fleet of Northern French, Flemings, Frisians and Danes, and set out from northern Europe for the eastern Mediterranean in Spring 1097. He sailed up to Tarsus, where he found Baldwin of Boulogne besieging the place, then held by Tancred of Hauteville, a fellow Christian but rival of Baldwin's for dominance in Cilicia. Excited to find a native of his own home town, he readily gave assistance to Baldwin, and after the town was taken he was given command of the garrison.

In 1098, after Baldwin had moved on to rejoin the main Crusading army, Tancred requested the assistance of Guynemer in taking Alexandretta, which was held by the Turks. With Baldwin out of the region, Guynemer consented and together they captured the city. At the Siege of Antioch, Guynemer briefly held Latakia.

== Sources ==
- Albert of Aix, History of the Expedition to Jerusalem
- William of Tyre, History of Deeds Done Beyond the Sea
- Setton, Kenneth, editor. A History of the Crusades. Madison: 1969–1989, pp. 300-302, 325, (available online).
