= William (bishop of Orange) =

Provençal bishop in the 11th century

William, Bishop of Orange was a senior figure in the 11th century Provençal clergy and a participant in the First Crusade.

== Life ==
William participated in the council of Piacenza in March 1095 and the council of Clermont in November 1095. In 1096, William and Hugh of Châteauneuf, Bishop of Grenoble, went to Genoa and preached in the church of San Siro, in order to gather troops for the First Crusade. William then joined the army of Raymund of Toulouse on their march across the Balkan and through Anatolia. After the death of Adhemar of Le Puy in August 1098 in Antioch, he was recognized as leader of the clergy, until he himself died six months later in December 1098 in Ma'arrat al-Nu'man.
