= Dei gesta per Francos =

Narrative of the First Crusade

Dei gesta per Francos ("Deeds of God through the Franks") is a narrative of the First Crusade by Guibert of Nogent written between 1107 and 1108. Traditionally it has not been well received by scholars, but recent translators and editors (such as Levine 1997 and Rubenstein 2002) have shown it to contain important original material. Dei gesta was a radical departure for the type of literary work for Guibert who had previously worked on theological tracts. He decided to undertake a history of the crusade, he says, after he read an anonymous eyewitness account called Gesta Francorum. In the eyes of Guibert this work was rough and simple and "frequently left the reader stunned with its insipid vacuity" (Dei gesta, preface). Guibert felt a much higher standard of grammar and diction was needed. He also inserted anti-Jewish rhetoric into the account of the First Crusade.

There were some who believed it was best to leave the writing of history to those who had actually seen the events themselves, and thus were critical of Guibert's project. Guibert himself had said as much about 10 years earlier in a preachers manual. However he justified the book by saying if "someone objects to me that I have not seen, he can not object that I have not heard—for I truly believe that hearing is, in a way, almost as good as seeing." (Dei gesta, preface). Guibert personally knew crusaders, had grown up with crusaders, and had talked with them about their memories and experiences on their return.

Crusade historians have traditionally not been forthcoming with favourable reviews of Guibert's narrative. The fact that he stays so close to the original Gesta Francorum, and the difficulty of his Latin, make it seem superfluous. Recent editors and translators, however, have called attention to his excellent writing and original material. More importantly, Dei gesta provides invaluable information about the reception of the crusade in France, both for the general public and Guibert's own personal reactions to the stories he heard from returning crusaders.

Guibert was a rare eyewitness to the preachings of Peter the Hermit for whom he felt nothing but contempt. The hermit, he says, walked barefoot and ate no bread, but he did drink wine and eat fish - criticism of an itinerant hermit from the monastic Guibert. When Peter fled the siege of Antioch, most chroniclers glossed over Peter's flight, but Guibert spared no measure when he wrote this mocking song, wondering why Peter could not withstand the starving pressures of a siege:

Stand firm! Remember your life as a hermit,
Your old customary fasts!
Hitherto you have been skin and bone.
You've had no choice but to eat grass with the cattle
Your grumbling stomach calmed with uncooked roots.
How could you now remember gluttonous feasts?
--Dei gesta

Dei gesta was not only a historical narrative but contained moral instruction; the reader might learn lessons for his own spiritual quest. It also contained elements of prophecy, discussing how the crusade was part of the larger divine plan. Thus it was a medieval allegory work containing the four elements of allegory: literal, typological, moral, and anagogical. Like the Bible, it worked on different levels at the same time.

The work is important for French Catholics, monarchists and nationalists, as it strengthens the narrative of France being the eldest daughter of the church.
