= Historia Hierosolymitana (Robert the Monk) =

c. 1107-1120 First Crusade chronicle by Robert the Monk

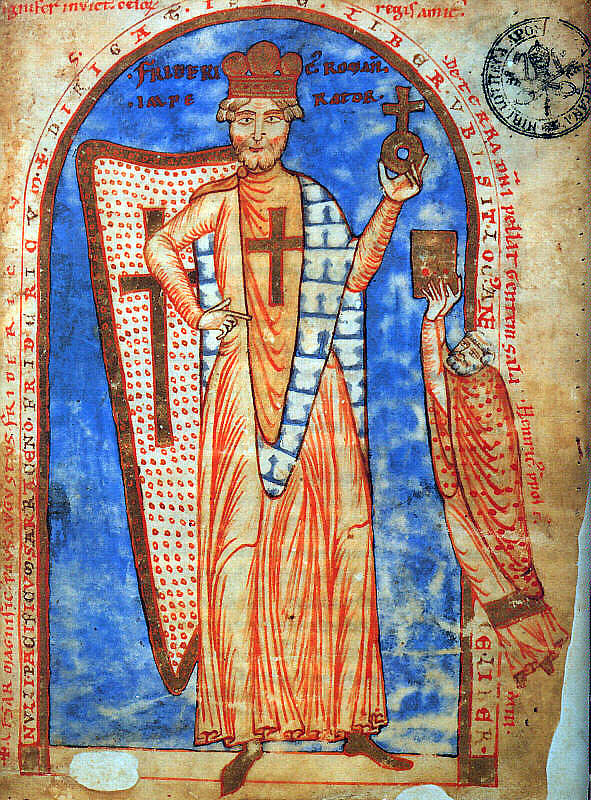
Emperor Frederick Barbarossa (1122–1190) as a crusader. Dedicatory image (c. 1188) in a manuscript of the Historia Hierosolymitana (Vat. Lat. 2001).

Historia Hierosolymitana is a chronicle of the First Crusade written between c. 1107–1120 by Robert the Monk (Robertus Monachus), a French prior.

== Chronicle ==
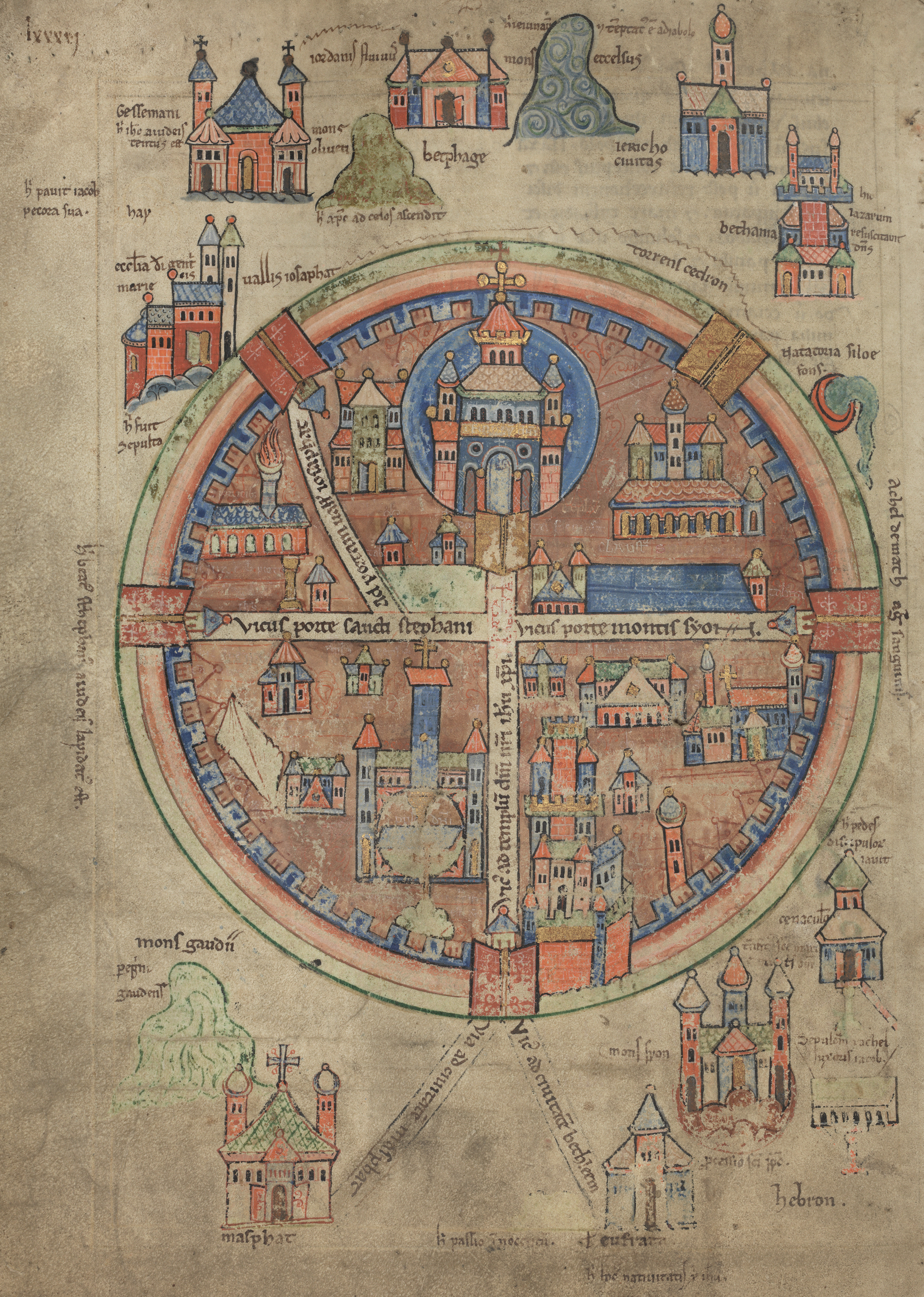
The chronicle includes one of the Crusader maps of Jerusalem

Robert has been identified with a prior of Senuc and former abbot of Saint-Remi, who lived c. 1055 – 1122; hence he is also referred to as Robert of Reims or Robert of Saint-Remi (Robertus Remensis). Robert asserts in his prologue that he had been present at the Council of Clermont of 1095, which makes his account of Pope Urban II's speech that of an eye-witness, even though written from memory, twelve or more years later. Outside this part, however, the author proposes not to write about his own observations but as a chronicler, having agreed to rewrite, at the request of his abbot, the Gesta Francorum, an account written by a soldier of Bohemond I of Antioch, in a less "rustic" style. Robert introduced into the narrative of the First Crusade a Benedictine interpretation, and one that included apocalyptic elements.

Robert's chronicle contains an account of Pope Urban II's speech at the Council of Clermont of November 1095, the call to arms for the First Crusade. This speech is also recorded by another eye-witness, Fulcher of Chartres, and most historians tend to consider Fulcher's version as closer to the original speech, while Robert's version is seen as embellished and more "dramatic", and in parts informed by the later success of the First Crusade. Both Robert's and Fulcher's account of the speech include a description of the terrible plight of the Christians in the East under the recent conquests of the Turks and the promise of remission of sins for those who go to their aid. Robert's version, however, includes a more vivid description of the atrocities committed by the conquerors, describing the desecration of churches, the forced circumcision, beheading and torture by disemboweling of Christian men and alluding to grievous rape of Christian women.

According to Robert, Urban addressed his call explicitly to the race of the Franks, of which he was himself a member, invoking the valour of their ancestors, "the glory and greatness of king Charles the Great, and of his son Louis", culminating in "Oh, most valiant soldiers and descendants of invincible ancestors, be not degenerate, but recall the valour of your progenitors."

Robert's version also describes the spontaneous reaction of Urban's audience, bursting into cries of Deus vult ("God wills it"); this motto and battle cry is also found in the Gesta Francorum, there in the more "vulgar" or vernacular form of Deus le volt. In a further element not found in Fulcher's account, and perhaps inspired after the fact by the failure of the People's Crusade, Urban warns that the expedition is not commanded or advised for the old or feeble, those unfit for bearing arms, or for women, but for experienced soldiers, that clergy should only take part with the consent of their bishop and laymen only with the blessing of their priest.

Robert's work was the likely source of Gilo of Paris's Historia vie Hierosolimitane. Metullus of Tegernsee, a 12th-century monk and poet, made a verse adaptation of Robert's work in his Expeditio Ierosolimitana.

== Publication history ==
An edition was produced for the Recueil des historiens des croisades series, appearing in 1866. A modern critical edition of the work was published in 2013. An English translation appeared in the Crusade Texts in Translation series in 2005.
