= Council of Clermont =

1095 Catholic Church synod starting the First Crusade

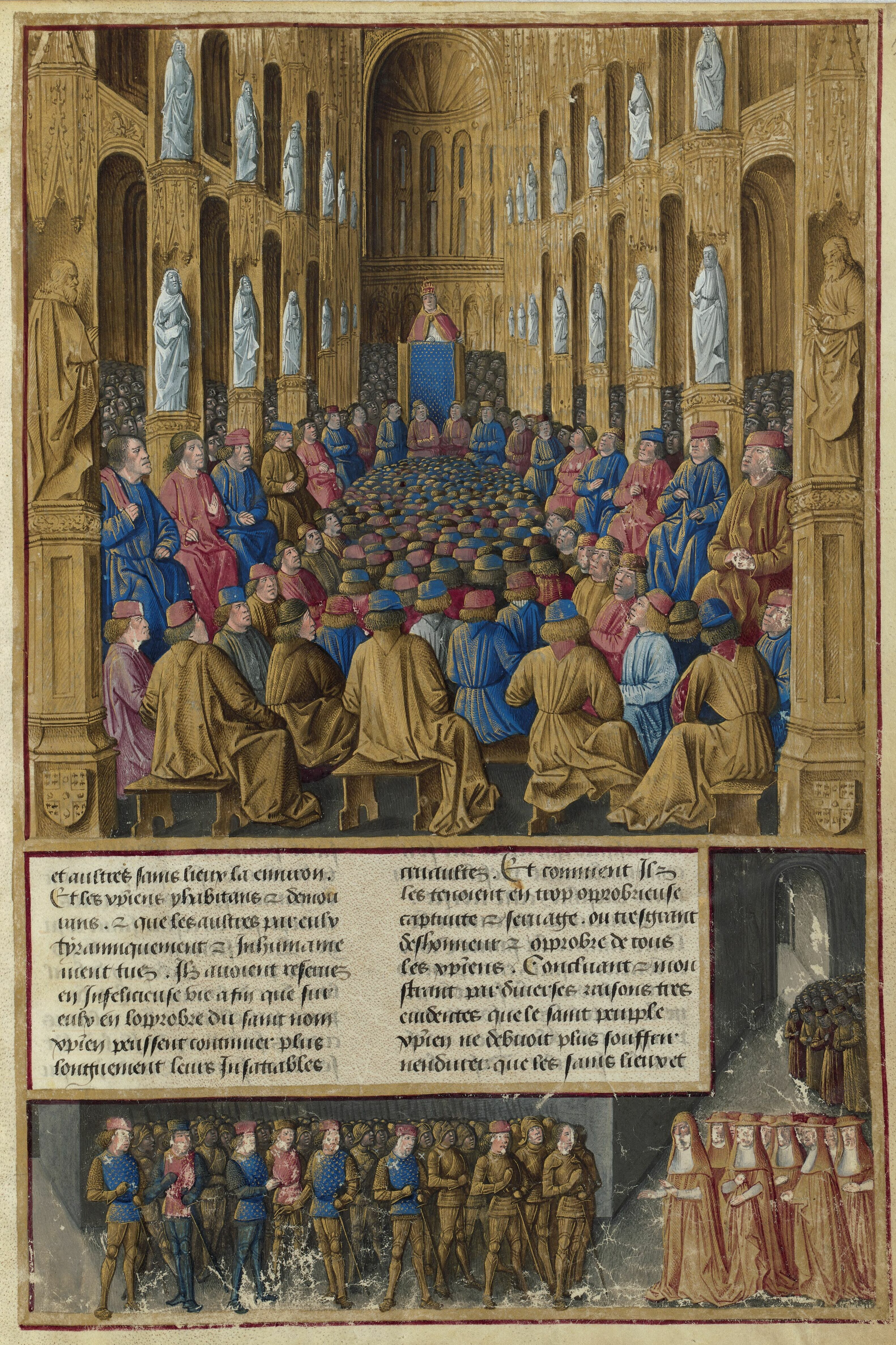
Pope Urban II at the Council of Clermont, given a late Gothic setting in this illumination from the Livre des Passages d'Outre-mer, of c. 1474 (Bibliothèque nationale)

The Council of Clermont was a mixed synod of ecclesiastics and laymen of the Catholic Church, called by Pope Urban II and held from 17 to 27 November 1095 at Clermont, Auvergne, at the time part of the Duchy of Aquitaine.

While the council is known today primarily for the speech Pope Urban gave on the final day, it was primarily a synod focused on implementing the Cluniac reforms, enacting decrees and settling local and regional issues. This also included the extension of the excommunication of Philip I of France for his adulterous remarriage to Bertrade of Montfort and a declaration of renewal of the Truce of God, an attempt on the part of the church to reduce feuding among Frankish nobles.

Pope Urban's speech on 27 November included the call to arms that would result in the First Crusade, and eventually the capture of Jerusalem and the establishment of the Kingdom of Jerusalem. In this, Urban reacted to the request by Byzantine emperor Alexius I Comnenus who had sent envoys to the Council of Piacenza requesting military assistance against the Seljuk Turks. Several accounts of the speech survive; of these, the one by Fulcher of Chartres, who was present at the council, is generally accepted as the most reliable.

== Participants ==
The council was attended by about 300 French clerics. No official list of the participants or of the signatories to the decrees of the Council survives. A partial list of some of the attendees can nonetheless be constructed.

- Joannes, Cardinal Bishop of Porto
- Dagobert, Archbishop of Pisa
- Saint Bruno, Bishop of Segni
- Gualterius, Cardinal Bishop of Albano
- Rangerius, O.S.B., Archbishop of Reggio Calabria
- Richard, Cardinal Priest and Abbot of S. Victor in Marseille
- Teuzo, Cardinal Priest of SS. Joannis et Pauli
- Albertus, O.S.B., Cardinal Priest of Santa Sabina
- Joannes Gattellus, the Pope's Chancellor
- Gregory Papiensis, deacon
- Hugo of Verdun, deacon
- Hugues de Die, Archbishop of Lyon and Papal Legate
- Amatus, Archbishop of Bordeaux and Papal Legate
- Rainaldus, Archbishop of Reims
- Richerius, Archbishop of Sens
- Rollandus, Bishop of Dol
- Dalmatius, Archbishop of Narbonne
- Bernard of Sédirac, Archbishop of Toledo and Legate in Spain
- Hoellus (Hoël,) Bishop of Le Mans
- Geoffrey of Vendôme, Cardinal Priest of the titular church of Santa Prisca on the Aventine
- Benedict, Bishop of Nantes
- Petrus, Bishop of Poitiers
- Ivo, Bishop of Chartres
- Lambert, bishop of Arras
- Joannes, Bishop of Orléans
- Roger, Bishop of Beauvais
- Radulfus (Raoul), Archbishop of Tours
- Hilgot, former Bishop of Soissons, monk of Marmoutiers

== Speech ==
Gesta Francorum – Liber I; read in Latin with English subtitles, containing an account of the Council of Clermont

There are six main sources of information about this portion of the council:

1. A letter that was written by Urban himself in December 1095 referring to the council;
2. The anonymous Gesta Francorum ("The Deeds of the Franks" dated c. 1100/1101);
3. Fulcher of Chartres, who was present at the council, in his Gesta Francorum Iherusalem peregrinantium (c. 1100–1105);
4. Robert the Monk, who may have been present at the council, in Historia Hierosolymitana (1107);
5. Baldric, archbishop of Dol (written c. 1105);
6. Guibert de Nogent, Dei gesta per Francos (1107/8).

The five versions of the speech vary widely in their details. The account by Fulcher, who is known to have been present at the council, is generally considered the most reliable version.

=== Urban's letter ===
Urban's own letter, written in December 1095 and addressed to the faithful "waiting in Flanders," does lament that "a barbaric fury has deplorably afflicted and laid waste the churches of God in the regions of the Orient". Urban does allude to Jerusalem, saying that this barbaric fury has "even grasped in intolerable servitude its churches and the Holy City of Christ, glorified by His passion and resurrection". He calls upon the princes to "free the churches of the East", appointing Adhemar of Le Puy as the leader of the expedition, to set out on the day of the Assumption of Mary (15 August 1096).

=== Gesta Francorum ===
The Gesta Francorum does not give an account of the speech at any length, it merely mentions that Urban called upon all to "take up the way of the Lord" and be prepared to suffer much, assured of their reward in heaven. It goes on to emphasize how news of Urban's call to arms quickly spread by word of mouth "through all the regions and countries of Gaul, the Franks, upon hearing such reports, forthwith caused crosses to be sewed on their right shoulders, saying that they followed with one accord the footsteps of Christ, by which they had been redeemed from the hand of hell."

=== Fulcher ===
Fulcher of Chartres was present at the speech, and recorded it in Gesta Francorum Jerusalem Expugnantium. He was writing from memory a few years later (c. 1100–1105). He asserts, in his prologue, that he is recording only such events as he had seen with his own eyes, and his record is phrased in a way consistent with the style of oration known from papal speeches in the 11th century.

In Fulcher's text, Urban begins by reminding the clergy present that they are shepherds, and that they must be vigilant and avoid carelessness and corruption. He reminds them to refrain from simony and to adhere to the laws of the church. Urban complains about the lack of justice and public order in the Frankish provinces and calls for the re-establishment of the truce protecting clergy from violence. In the historiography of the Crusades, there is a long-standing argument as to how much the pacification of the Frankish realm was designed to go hand in hand with the "export of violence" to the enemy in the east. Fulcher reports that everyone present agreed to the pope's propositions and promised to adhere to the church's decrees.

In the second portion of his speech, Urban urges the Frankish Christians that once they have re-established peace and righteousness in their own land, they should turn their attention to the East and bring aid to the Christians there, as the Turks had attacked them and had recently conquered the territory of Romania (i.e., Byzantine Anatolia) as far west as the Mediterranean, the part known as the "Arm of Saint George" (the Sea of Marmara), killing and capturing many Christians and destroying churches and devastating the kingdom of God. In order to avoid further loss of territory and even more widespread attacks on Christians, Urban calls on the clergy present to publish his call to arms everywhere, and persuade all people of whatever rank, both nobles and commoners, to go to the aid of the Christians currently under attack. Concluding his call to arms with "Christ commands it" (Christus autem imperat), Urban defines the crusade both as a defensive just war and as a religious holy war.

Urban goes on to promise immediate absolution to all who die either on the way or in battle against Muslims. He then connects his call to arms with his previous call for peace in Gaul: "Let those who have been accustomed unjustly to wage private warfare against the faithful now go against the infidels and end with victory this war which should have been begun long ago. Let those who for a long time, have been robbers, now become knights. Let those who have been fighting against their brothers and relatives now fight in a proper way against the barbarians. Let those who have been serving as mercenaries for small pay now obtain the eternal reward. Let those who have been wearing themselves out in both body and soul now work for a double honor." The speech ends with Urban asking that all who plan to go rent their lands and raise money for their expenses as soon as possible, and that they leave when winter ends and spring begins.

=== Robert ===
Some historians prefer the version of the speech reported by Robert the Monk in his Historia Iherosolimitana, written in 1107. Robert gives a more vivid account, consisting both of a more elaborate sermon and the "dramatic response" of the audience, bursting into spontaneous cries of Deus vult. In Robert's version, Urban calls the "race of the Franks" to Christian orthodoxy, reform and submission to the Church and to come to the aid of the Greek Christians in the east. As in Fulcher's account, Urban promises remission of sins for those who went to the east. Robert's account of Urban's speech has the rhetoric of a dramatic "battle speech". Urban here emphasizes reconquering the Holy Land more than aiding the Greeks, an aspect lacking in Fulcher's version and considered by many historians an insertion informed by the success of the First Crusade. Both Robert's and Fulcher's accounts of the speech include a description of the terrible plight of the Christians in the East under the recent conquests of the Turks and the promise of remission of sins for those who go to their aid. Robert's version, however, includes a more vivid description of the atrocities committed by the conquerors, describing the desecration of churches, the forced circumcision, beheading and torture by disemboweling of Christian men and alluding to grievous rape of Christian women. Perhaps with the wisdom of hindsight, Robert makes Urban advise that none but knights should go, not the old and feeble, nor priests without the permission of their bishops, "for such are more of a hindrance than aid, more of a burden than advantage... nor ought women to set out at all, without their husbands or brothers or legal guardians."

=== Baldric ===
About the same time, Baldric, archbishop of Dol, also basing his account generally on Gesta Francorum, reported an emotional sermon focusing on the offenses of the Muslims and the reconquest of the Holy Land in terms likely to appeal to chivalry. Like Fulcher he also recorded that Urban deplored the violence of the Christian knights of Gaul. "It is less wicked to brandish your sword against Saracens," Baldric's Urban cries, comparing them to the Amalekites. The violence of knights he wanted to see ennobled in the service of Christ, defending the churches of the East as if defending a mother. Baldric asserts that Urban, there on the spot, appointed the bishop of Puy to lead the crusade.

=== Guibert ===
Guibert, abbot of Nogent in his Dei gesta per Francos (1107/8) also wrote that Urban emphasized the reconquest of the Holy Land more than help to the Greeks or other Christians there. This emphasis may, as in the case of Robert and Baldric, be due to the influence account of the reconquest of Jerusalem in the Gesta Francorum. Urban's speech in Guibert's version, emphasizes the sanctity of the Holy Land, which must be in Christian possession so that prophecies about the end of the world could be fulfilled.

== General and cited references ==
- Peters, Edward, ed. (1971). The First Crusade. Philadelphia: University of Pennsylvania Press. ISBN 0812210174.
- Somerville, Robert, "The Council of Clermont and the First Crusade", Studia Gratiana 20 (1976), 325–337.
- Somerville, Robert, "The Council of Clermont (1095), and Latin Christian Society", Archivum Historiae Pontificiae 12 (1974): 55–90 JSTOR 23563638
- Strack, Georg, "The sermon of Urban II in Clermont 1095 and the Tradition of Papal Oratory", Medieval Sermon Studies 56 (2012): 30–45, doi:10.1179/1366069112Z.0000000002(pdf).
- Titterton, James (2020). "Bloodless Turks and Sanguine Crusaders: William of Malmesbury's Use of Vegetius in His Account of Urban II's Sermon at Clermont". The Medieval Chronicle. 13: 289–308. doi:10.1163/9789004428560_014. ISBN 9789004428560. S2CID 219787181.
