= Raymond of Aguilers =

Chronicler and participant in the First Crusade

Raymond of Aguilers was a participant in and chronicler of the First Crusade (1096–1099). During the campaign he became the chaplain of Count Raymond IV of Toulouse, the leader of the Provençal army of crusaders. His chronicle, entitled Historia Francorum qui ceperunt Iherusalem, which he co-wrote with Pons of Balazun, ends with the events immediately following the capture of Jerusalem in 1099.

== Biography ==
Raymond was probably born second half of the 11th century in the vicinity of Toulouse. "Aguilers" is probably a reference to the village of Aiguilhe. Before the crusade, Raymond was a lay canon (deacon) of the cathedral of Le Puy. He probably travelled originally in the entourage of Bishop Adhemar of Le Puy, the papal legate. There is a purported charter of Bishop Adhemar that refers to his chancellor as Raymond of Aguilhes, but the existence of this charter and the identification of the chancellor and the canon are doubtful. Raymond was ordained a priest during the Siege of Antioch in 1098 and was made a chaplain to Count Raymond and thus a member of his household after the death of Raymond's previous confessor, Bishop William of Orange. After the successful conquest of Jerusalem he was the likely author of the letter the crusaders wrote to Pope Urban II in 1099.

Raymond reports that he was among the first to believe Peter Bartholomew's claim to have seen in a vision the location of the Holy Lance and that he participated in the digging that led to its discovery in the Church of Saint Peter. The authenticity of the Holy Lance and of Peter's visions is a major theme of his work, although he admits that Peter did not unambiguously pass the ordeal by fire in April 1099.

== Author of the Historia Francorum qui ceperunt Iherusalem ==
Everything we know about Raymond is derived from the Historia, the idea for which he credits to Pons. Raymond must have been the main author and finisher, however, since Pons died before the capture of Jerusalem. The Historia was probably started as the crusade progressed, possibly just after the discovery of the Holy Lance, and the preface added later. It was completed before the death of Count Raymond in 1105.

His account is partial to the Peasants' Crusade and takes a dim view of those who deserted or abandoned the expedition (and their vows). He had access to the Gesta Francorum, of which he made some use, and his Historia was used as a source by Fulcher of Chartres for the work he completed in 1101. He was further influenced by his time at the Le Puy Cathedral whose library, including the famous Le Puy Bible, was comparable to some of the best of the late tenth and early eleventh century.

Compared to other authors of works on the First Crusade, Raymond has a preference for references to the Old instead of the New Testament, using twice as many as his fellow Provencal Peter Tudebode. There are references to several eschatological elements in his account such as the Olivet Discourse, the Last Emperor or Apocalypse of Daniel.
