= Albert of Aix =

11th-century historian

Albert of Aix(-la-Chapelle), also known as Albert of Aachen; Latin: Albericus Aquensis; fl. c. 1100) was a historian of the First Crusade and the early Kingdom of Jerusalem. He was born during the later part of the 11th century, and afterwards became canon (priest) and custos (guardian) of the church of Aachen.

Nothing else is known of his life except that he was the author of a Historia Hierosolymitanae expeditionis (“History of the Expedition to Jerusalem”), or Chronicon Hierosolymitanum de bello sacro, a work in Latin in twelve books, written between 1125 and 1150. This history begins at the time of the Council of Clermont in 1095, deals with the fortunes of the First Crusade and the earlier history of the Latin Kingdom of Jerusalem, and ends somewhat abruptly in 1121.

The Historia was well known during the Middle Ages, and was largely used by William of Tyre for the first six books of his Historia rerum in partibus transmarinis gestarum. In modern times, it was accepted unreservedly for many years by most historians, including Edward Gibbon. In more recent times beginning with Heinrich von Sybel, its historical value has been seriously impugned, but the verdict of the best scholarship seems to be that in general it forms a true record of the events of the First Crusade, although containing some legendary matter.

Albert never visited the Holy Land, but he appears to have had a considerable amount of discourse with returned crusaders, and to have had access to valuable correspondence, for example: he interviewed survivors of the Battle of Ramla, writing down their experiences; another example can be seen from the case of the killing of William II Jordan, told by returning Crusaders to Germany. Unlike many other chronicles of the First Crusade, Albert did not rely on the Gesta Francorum, but used his own independent interviews; he may also have had access to the Chanson d'Antioche, as his work shares textual similarities with that poem. The first edition of the history was published at Helmstedt in 1584, and a translation, with the original Latin, is in the Recueil des historiens des croisades, Volume 4.iii (1879). A modern edition in Latin and English translation by Susan B. Edgington is available in the Oxford Medieval Texts series. (cf. Volumes 24 and 25 of Crusader Texts in Translation.)

== Bibliography ==
- Albert of Aachen, Albert of Aachen's History of the Journey to Jerusalem, vol.1: Books 1-6. The First Crusade 1095-1099, trans. S.B. Edgington (Farnham, 2013).
- Albert of Aachen, Albert of Aachen's History of the Journey to Jerusalem, vol. 2: Books 7-12. The Early History of the Latin States 1099-1119, trans. S.B. Edgington (Farnham, 2013).
