= Fulcher of Chartres =

French chronicler of the First Crusade

Fulcher of Chartres (c. 1059 in or near Chartres – after 1128; French: Foucher de Chartres; Latin: Fulcherus Carnotensis) was a priest who participated in the First Crusade. He served Baldwin I of Jerusalem for many years and wrote a Latin chronicle of the Crusade.

== Life ==
Fulcher was born c. 1059. His appointment as chaplain of Baldwin of Boulogne in 1097 suggests that he had been trained as a priest, most likely at the school of Chartres. However, he was probably not a member of the cathedral chapter, since he is not named in the listing of the Dignitaries of the Church of Our Lady of Chartres.

The details of the Council of Clermont of 1095, in his history, suggest he attended the council personally, or knew someone who did; perhaps Ivo, Bishop of Chartres, who influenced Fulcher's opinions on Church reform and the investiture controversy with the Holy Roman Empire.

Fulcher was part of the entourage of Count Stephen II of Blois and Duke Robert Curthose of Normandy which made its way through southern France and Italy in 1096, crossing into the Eastern Roman Empire from Bari and arriving in Constantinople in 1097, where they joined with the other armies of the First Crusade. He travelled through Asia Minor to Marash, shortly before the army's arrival at Antioch in 1097, where he was appointed chaplain to Baldwin of Boulogne. He followed his new lord after Baldwin split off from the main army, to Edessa, where Baldwin founded the county of Edessa.

After the conquest of Jerusalem in 1099 Fulcher and Baldwin travelled to the city to complete their pilgrimage. When Baldwin became king of Jerusalem in 1100, Fulcher came with him to Jerusalem and continued as his chaplain until Baldwin died in 1118.

Fulcher accompanied King Baldwin at the Battle of Ramla in 1101, ministering to the king before the battle. He described the battle, "the number of foe was so great they swarmed over us so quickly that hardly anyone could see or recognize anyone else." Although the Crusaders were routed at first, Baldwin committed his reserves and lead the counter charge himself and defeated the Muslim force.

At that time, Fulcher may have been serving as Prior at the Mount of Olives. After 1115 he was the canon of the Church of the Holy Sepulchre, possibly attached to the Canons of the Holy Sepulchre, and was probably responsible for the relics and treasures in the church. Fulcher was a resident of Jerusalem at least through 1127, but nothing further is known of him.

== Chronicle ==
Fulcher wrote his chronicle of the Crusade Gesta Francorum Iherusalem Peregrinantium (A history of the expedition to Jerusalem) in three books. He started writing it in 1101 and finished around 1128. The chronicle is considered among the best records of the crusade. Included in the chronicle is his account of Pope Urban II's November 1095 speech at the Council of Clermont where Urban calls for the First Crusade:

[Your] brethren who live in the east are in urgent need of your help, and you must hasten to give them the aid which has often been promised them. For, as the most of you have heard, the Turks and Arabs have attacked them and have conquered the territory of Romania [the Greek empire] as far west as the shore of the Mediterranean and the Hellespont, which is called the Arm of St. George. They have occupied more and more of the lands of those Christians, and have overcome them in seven battles. They have killed and captured many, and have destroyed the churches and devastated the empire. If you permit them to continue thus for awhile with impurity, the faithful of God will be much more widely attacked by them.

At the earliest, Fulcher began his chronicle in the late autumn of 1100, or at the latest in the spring of 1101, in a version that has not survived but which was transmitted to Europe during his lifetime. This version was completed around 1106 and was used as a source by Guibert of Nogent, a contemporary of Fulcher in Europe.

He began his work at the urging of his travelling companions, who probably included Baldwin I. He had at least one library in Jerusalem at his disposal, from which he had access to letters and other documents of the crusade. In this library the Historia Francorum of Raymond of Aguilers and the Gesta Francorum must also have been available, which served as sources for much of the specific information in Fulcher's work that he did not personally witness.

Fulcher divided his chronicle into three books. Book I described the preparations for the First Crusade in Clermont in 1095 up to the conquest of Jerusalem and the establishment of the Kingdom of Jerusalem by Godfrey of Bouillon. It included an enthusiastic description of Constantinople. The second book described the deeds of Baldwin I, who succeeded Godfrey and was king of Jerusalem from 1100 to 1118. The third and final book reported on the life of king Baldwin II, until 1127 when there was a plague in Jerusalem, during which Fulcher apparently died. The second and third books were written from around 1109 to 1115, and from 1118 to 1127, compiled into a second edition by Fulcher himself.

Fulcher's work was used by many other chroniclers who lived after him. William of Tyre and William of Malmesbury used part of the chronicle as a source. His chronicle is generally accurate, though not entirely so. It was published in the Recueil des historiens des croisades and the Patrologia Latina, and a critical edition of the Latin version was published by Heinrich Hagenmeyer in 1913.

== Bibliography ==
- Peters, Edward, ed. (1971). The First Crusade. Philadelphia: University of Pennsylvania Press. ISBN 0812210174.
- Riley-Smith, Jonathan, The First Crusaders, 1095-1131, Cambridge University Press, London, 1997
- Runciman, Steven, A History of the Crusades, Volume One: The First Crusade and the Foundation of the Kingdom of Jerusalem, Cambridge University Press, London, 1951
- Thomas, David; Mallett, Alex, eds. (2011). Christian-Muslim Relations. A Bibliographical History, (1050-1200). Vol. 3. Brill.
