= Peter Tudebode =

Peter Tudebode (Latin: Petrus Tudebodus) was a Poitevin priest who was part of the First Crusade as part of the army of Raymond of Saint-Gilles. He wrote an account of the crusade, Historia de Hierosolymitano itinere, including an eye-witness account of the siege of Antioch of 1097–1098. The work is included in Patrologia Latina, Volume 155, pp. 758–823. The work appears in Recueil des historiens des croisades (RHC), with a translation and Præfatio by French historian Jean Besly (1572–1644).

The anonymous Gesta Francorum and Tudebode's account share similarities and there are disputes among scholars as to their relationship. Historian Jay Rubenstein suggests that both derive from a lost common source. This is disputed by Marcus Bull's recent examination of a little known manuscript related to these two chronicles, Peregrinatio Antiochie, which proposes that the Gesta is indeed the earliest surviving narrative from which the other two, the Historia and the Peregrinatio, as well as many others, descended.
