= Guibert of Nogent =

Benedictine writer and historian (c. 1055–1124)

Guibert de Nogent (c. 1055 – 1124) was a Benedictine historian, theologian, and author of autobiographical memoirs. Guibert was relatively unknown in his own time, going virtually unmentioned by his contemporaries. His account of the First Crusade has long been one of the standard primary sources amongst historians of that period, and his account of the Black Mass in Soissons is cited by many medieval historians writing on the subjects of heresy and witchcraft.

Nogent only began to catch the attention of scholars who came to him with a greater interest in his extensive autobiographical memoirs and personality during the 21st century.

In terms of the genre of autobiography, Guibert of Nogent picks up in the 12th century where Saint Augustine left off with his Confessions in the 4th century. "The next person to attempt a similar project [after Augustine] was Guibert de Nogent. Completed in 1115, The Monodies was the first fully realized autobiography in more than seven hundred years."

== Life ==
Guibert was born of parents from the minor nobility at Clermont-en-Beauvaisis. Guibert claims that it took his parents over seven years to conceive, as he writes in his Monodiae. According to his memoirs, the labour nearly cost him and his mother their lives, as Guibert was a breech birth. Guibert's family made an offering to a shrine of the Virgin Mary, and promised that if Guibert survived, he would be dedicated to a clerical life. Since he survived, he followed this path. His father was violent, unfaithful and prone to excess; he was captured at the Battle of Mortemer and died eight months later.

In his memoirs, Guibert views his death as a type of blessing and states that if his father had survived, he likely would have forced Guibert to become a knight, thus breaking the oath to the Virgin Mary to dedicate Guibert to the church. His mother was domineering, of great beauty and intelligence, and exceedingly zealous. Guibert writes so much about his mother, and in such detail, that some scholars, such as Archambault, have suggested that he may have had an Oedipus complex. This is another trait Nogent shares in common with Saint Augustine, incidentally. Nogent's mother assumed control of his education, isolated him from his peers and hired him a private tutor, from the ages of six to twelve. Guibert remembers the tutor as brutally exacting, and incompetent; nevertheless Guibert and his tutor developed a strong bond. When Guibert was around the age of twelve, his mother retired to an abbey near Saint-Germer-de-Fly (or Flay), and he soon followed. Entering the order at St. Germer, he studied with great zeal, devoting himself at first to the poets Ovid and Virgil—an experience which left its imprint on his works. He later changed his focus to theology, through the influence of Anselm of Bec, who later became the Archbishop of Canterbury.

In 1104, he was chosen abbot of the poor and tiny abbey of Nogent-sous-Coucy (founded 1059) and henceforth took a more prominent part in ecclesiastical affairs, where he came into contact with bishops and court society. More importantly, it gave him time to engage in his passion for writing. His first major work of this period is his history of the First Crusade called Dei gesta per Francos (God's deeds through the Franks), finished in 1108 and imprived in 1121.

The history is largely a paraphrase, in ornate style, of the Gesta Francorum of an anonymous Norman author. Crusade historians have traditionally not given it favourable reviews. The fact that he stays so close to Gesta Francorum, and the difficulty of his Latin, make it seem superfluous. Recent editors and translators, however, have called attention to his excellent writing and original material. More importantly, the Dei gesta supplies us with invaluable information about the reception of the crusade in France. Guibert personally knew crusaders, had grown up with crusaders, and talked with them about their memories and experiences.

His autobiography (De vita sua sive monodiarum suarum libri tres), or Monodiae (Solitary Songs, commonly referred to as his Memoirs), written in 1115, is considered the most interesting of his works. Written towards the close of his life and based on the model of the Confessions of Saint Augustine, he traces his life from his childhood to adulthood. Throughout it, he gives picturesque glimpses of his time and the customs of his country. The text is divided into three "Books." The first covers his own life, from birth to adulthood; the second is a brief history of his monastery; the third is a description of an uprising in nearby Laon. He provides invaluable information on daily life in castles and monasteries and on the educational methods then in vogue and gives insights into some of the major and minor personalities of his time. His work is coloured by his passions and prejudices, which add a personal touch to the work.

For example, he was quite skeptical about the propriety of relics of Jesus Christ, the Virgin Mary and numerous saints and entertained doubts about their authenticity. He noted that some shrines and pilgrimage sites made conflicting claims about which bodily remnants, clothing or other sacred objects were held at which site but he did claim to have seen King Louis VI treating scrofula sufferers with his own eyes.
