= Gesta Francorum =

Latin chronicle of the First Crusade

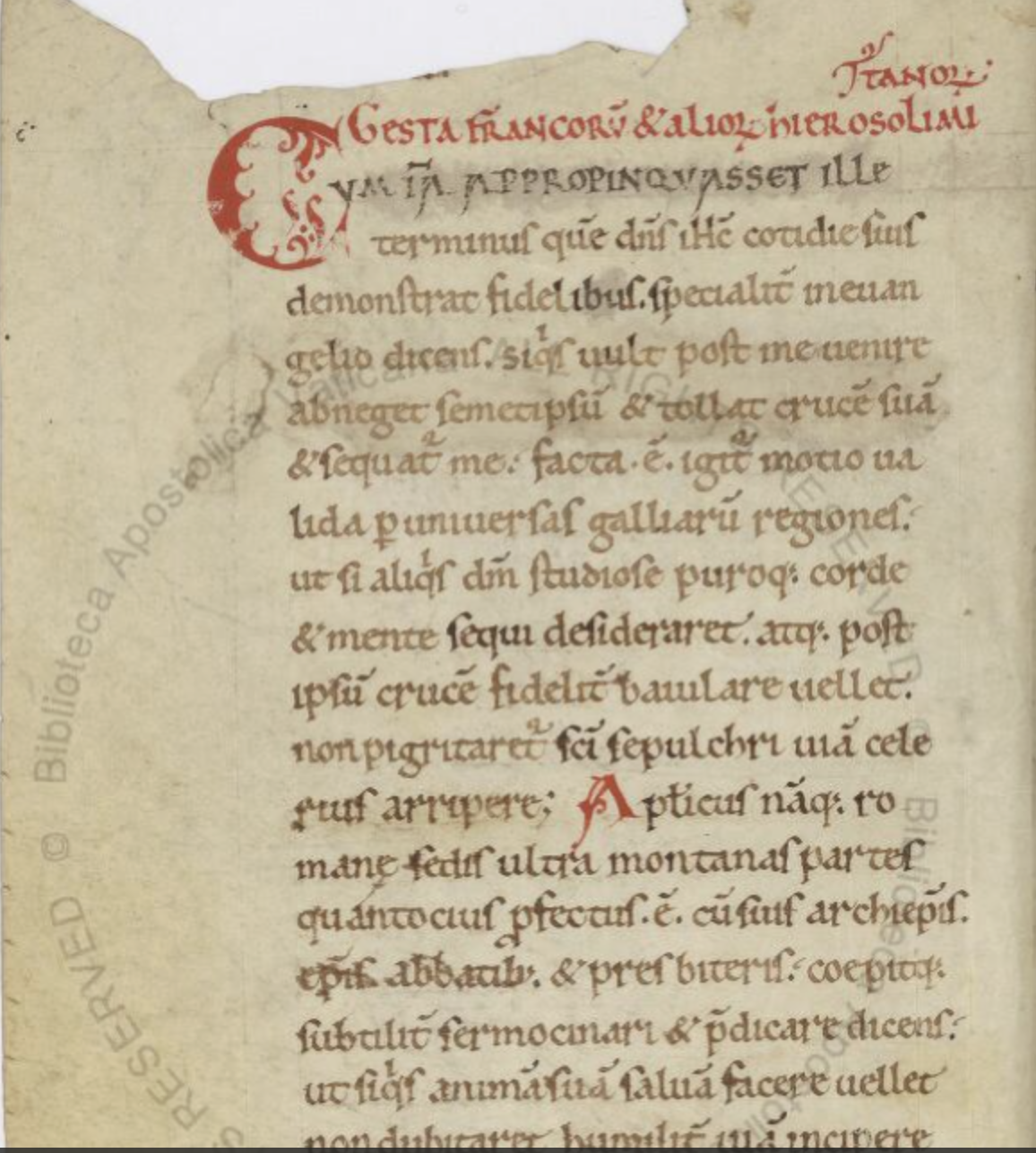
The first folio of the Vatican Reginensis manuscript of the Gesta Francorum, considered by scholars to represent the earliest surviving version of the text.

Gesta Francorum (Deeds of the Franks), or Gesta Francorum et aliorum Hierosolimitanorum (Deeds of the Franks and the other pilgrims to Jerusalem), is the name given to one of a family of Latin narrative accounts of the First Crusade. Its simplicity, relative brevity, and similarity to a number of other Latin accounts of the crusade have led scholars to advance a number of theories about the work's authorship, date, and relationship to the larger corpus of Latin crusade chronicles. Although it is still often cited as a stand-alone account of a single author, there is little agreement about the context or authorship of the work nor its exact place within the corpus. Its status as a very early account of the events, informed directly by the experiences of those that took part, is unquestioned. It remains one of the most important sources for the history of the First Crusade.

== Scope and style ==
The Gesta Francorum (often shortened to "the Gesta") narrates the events of the First Crusade from the time of its initial preaching by Pope Urban II in 1095 to the first Battle of Ascalon on 12 August 1099. As an account of a single event, it is a revolutionary book. As Jay Rubenstein has observed "in 1100, histories of single events were rare, almost unheard of." Compared to other narratives of the expedition, it is a short work of only about 20,000 words, divided in most manuscripts into ten books. The work's most recent editor, Rosalind Hill, called the style "extremely terse, simple, and unadorned." Notably, the account makes no direct reference to the Council of Clermont (17-27 November 1095) instead alluding to the preaching of the pope in France more generally. It begins, strikingly, with a reference to the words of Jesus Christ in Matthew 16:24

When that time had already come, of which the Lord Jesus warns his faithful people every day, especially in the Gospel where he says, “If any man will come after me, let him deny himself, and take up his cross, and follow me", there was a great stirring of heart throughout all the Frankish lands, so that if any man, with all his heart and all his mind, really wanted to follow God and faithfully to bear the cross after him, he could make no delay in taking the road to the Holy Sepulchre as quickly as possible.

— Gesta Francorum et aliorum Hierosolimitanorum (ed. Hill), Book I, page 1.

The first eight books give a concise account of the crusade's progress: from western Europe to the Byzantine capital of Constantinople, including the story of the People's Crusade (Book I); the siege and capture of Nicaea in May–June 1097 (Book II); the Battle of Dorylaeum on 1 July 1097 (Book III); the march across Anatolia, including the incursion of Tancred Marchisus into Cilicia (Book IV); the arrival at Antioch in November 1097 (Book V); the arrival of the forces of Fakhr al-Mulk Ridwan of Aleppo and the Lake Battle on 9 February 1098 (Book VI); the battle of the Bridge Gate in March 1098 (Book VII); the capture of the walls of Antioch by Bohemond of Taranto in April–May 1098 (Book VIII); the arrival of the army of Kerbogha of Mosul, the discovery of the Holy Lance, and the Battle of Antioch on 28 June 1098 (Book IX); the siege of Maarat al-Numan, the council of the leaders at All Saints Day 1098, a description of Antioch, and the march south to Jerusalem, the siege and capture of Jerusalem on 15 July 1099 and the first Battle of Ascalon on 12 August.

== Status among the earliest crusade narratives ==
What editors have come to call the Gesta Francorum et aliorum Hierosolimitanorum is one among several closely related Latin narratives. These include the account associated with Peter Tudebode, the Montecassino chronicle known as the Historia belli sacri, and the recently discovered Peregrinatio Antiochie. All of these works are so similar that, as Jay Rubenstein observes, it is very difficult to tell them apart unless consulting modern editions of their Latin texts (which show even very small variants to the texts). Until a comprehensive attempt is made to re-edit and contrast all of these works (and others which may come to light) it is difficult to know with confidence whether one of them was the source for the others, or whether all drew upon another lost source or group of sources. When the editors of the Recueil des historiens des croisades set out to prepare editions of all the Latin sources of the First Crusade that they knew about, they concluded that Peter Tudebode was the author of the original account, and that the Gesta Francorum was simply an abbreviated version of this text (they entitled it Tudebodus abbreviatus). Only later did editors contradict this view, giving the Gesta Francorum the status as the source text of Peter Tudebode and the Historia Belli Sacri as well as, it was believed, the series of substantial revisions undertaken by the three Benedictine monks Robert the Monk, Baudri of Bourgueil, and Guibert of Nogent, who all used the Gesta (or something very close to it) as the basis for their own chronicles in the first decade of the twelfth century.

In seeking to resolve the question of relationships between the Gesta Francorum and Peter Tudebode's work, Jay Rubenstein and Jean Flori proposed a lost common source, which Rubenstein called "the Jerusalem history," Subsequently, Marcus Bull has argued that when both texts are compared to the Peregrinatio Antiochie, it becomes clear that the Gesta Francorum is indeed earlier, but that a process of revisions and additions were underway before Tudebode made his own version. Carol Symes has argued that the Latin account of the crusade emerged as the result of written memories of many participants, whose work circulated in now-lost libelli: "in short, there are no grounds for believing in a dominant or single Ur-text of the crusade story, nor does the evidence bear out claims that the Gesta was the earliest or only written account available,"

== Authorship ==
Nothing of certainty is known about the Gesta's author, nor if the work had a single author. Scholars of the earlier twentieth century believed the author to be a layman, possibly a knight who lost his mount during the expedition and became a footsoldier. They also believed the author to have been a follower of the crusade leader Bohemond of Taranto, who looms large in the narrative. Jay Rubenstein has pointed out, however, that the author was also harshly critical of Bohemond, and that interest in Bohemond's exploits would not have been surprising for any member of the expedition. As Rubenstein also observes, there is probably more evidence that the author was a cleric than a lay person. Although the Latin is simple, the author quotes, paraphrases and merges Biblical passages, and Marcus Bull characterizes parts of the text (particularly Book IX) as complex with subtle intertextual references.

== Source for later chronicles ==
Either the Gesta Francorum itself or some very closely related text was used as the basis for three much longer, more detailed, and more stylistically ambitious accounts of the First Crusade. These three histories were all composed by Benedictine monks working in northwestern Francia: Robert the Monk, Baudri of Bourgueil, and Guibert of Nogent. These authors complained of the simplicity of the text, and that it left out what to them seemed like major elements of the story such as the Council of Clermont. Notwithstanding their complaints, they all utilized it as a major source for their works.

How and why the Gesta Francorum came to be the source for all three chroniclers at around the same time has been the source of scholarly disagreement. In concert with his belief that the author of the Gesta was a southern Italian follower of Bohemond of Taranto, Augustus C. Krey first advanced the argument that Bohemond himself had brought the Gesta with him to northern Francia as part of his campaign to recruit a new crusade army in 1105. This argument has been broadly popular with scholars, including the modern translator of Robert the Monk's chronicle Carol Sweetenham and has been expanded to explain the circulation of other crusade texts, such as the chronicle of Fulcher of Chartres, at around the same time. Skepticism regarding this role for the Gesta has been voiced in several quarters. Marc Carrier observed that the Gesta would not have made effective anti-Byzantine propaganda. Nicholas Paul argued that it was unlikely that Bohemond, who does not seem to have had extensive engagement with written texts before the First Crusade, would have used a Latin book to recruit lay warriors. Jay Rubenstein reaffirmed his belief in the idea that Bohemond (or someone in his entourage) embraced the utility of Latin histories, arguing that the distribution of the Gesta may have been followed by the recruitment of Ralph of Caen for the purpose of writing a Deeds of Bohemond (which became the Deeds of Tancred) after Bohemond's death.

== Manuscripts ==
In 2011, Marcus Bull identified seven manuscripts of the Gesta Francorum:

- Vatican City, Biblioteca Apostolica Vaticana, MS Reg. lat. 572, fols 1v-64v (12th century)
- Vatican City, Biblioteca Apostolica Vaticana, MS Reg. lat. 641, fols 1r-46v (12th century)
- El Escorial, Biblioteca de El Escorial, MS d.III.ii, fols 1r-19v (12th /13th century)
- Berlin, Staatsbibliothek, MS lat.qu 503, fols 1r-37r (12th/13th century)
- Cambridge, Corpus Christi College Library MS 281 (12th /13th century)
- Madrid, Biblioteca Nacional de España MS 9783, fols 149r-175v (13th century)
- Cambridge, Gonville and Caius College Library MS 162/83, fols. 111r-138v (14th century)

== Bibliography ==
- Bull, Marcus (2011). "Gesta Francorum et aliorum Hierosolimitanorum". Christian Muslim Relations Online I. Brill. doi:10.1163/1877-8054_cmri_COM_24034.
- Bull, Marcus (2012). "The Relationship Between the Gesta Francorum and Peter Tudebode's Historia de Hierosolymitano Itinere: The Evidence of a Hitherto Unexamined Manuscript (St. Catharine's College, Cambridge, 3)". Crusades. 11 (1): 1–17. doi:10.1080/28327861.2012.12220333. ISSN 1476-5276.
- Carrier, Marc (2008). "Pour en finir avec les Gesta Francorum: une réflexion historiographique sur l'état des rapports entre Grecs et Latins au début du XIIe siècle et sur l'apport nouveau d'Albert d'Aix". Crusades. 7: 13–34. doi:10.4324/9781315271606-2 (inactive 1 July 2025).
- Delorez, Albert (2013). "The Abbey of Saint-Bertin, the Liber Floridus, and the Origin of the Gesta Francorum Hierusalem expugnantium". Manuscripta. 57 (1): 1–28. doi:10.1484/J.MSS.1.103471. ISSN 0025-2603.
- Hill, Rosalind (1962). Nelsons̀ medieval classics : Gesta francorum et aliorum hierosolimitanorum : the deeds of the Franks and the other pilgrims to Jerusalem. London: Nelson. OCLC 757733250.
- Krey, Augustus C. (1928). "A Neglected Passage in the Gesta Francorum and Its Bearing on the Literature of the First Crusade". In Paetow, Louis John (ed.). The Crusades, and other historical essays; presented to Dana C. Munro by his former students. New York: F.S. Crofts. pp. 57–78. OCLC 569056943.
- Lees, Beatrice Adelaide (1924). Anonymi gesta Francorum et aliorum Hierosolymitanorum edited by Beatrice A. Lees. Oxford : Clarendon Press.
- Niskanen, Samu (2012). "The origins of the Gesta Francorum and two related texts: their textual and literary character". Sacris Erudiri. 51: 287–316. doi:10.1484/J.SE.1.103177. ISSN 0771-7776.
- Niskanen, Samu (2019). "Copyists and redactors". In Merisalo, Outi; Kuha, Miika; Niiranen, Susanna (eds.). Transmission of Knowledge in the Late Middle Ages and the Renaissance. Bibliologia. Vol. 53. Brepols Publishers. pp. 103–114. doi:10.1484/m.bib-eb.5.117235. hdl:10138/304830. ISBN 978-2-503-58156-9.
- Paul, Nicholas L. (2010). "A Warlord's Wisdom: Literacy and Propaganda at the Time of the First Crusade". Speculum. 85 (3): 534–566. doi:10.1017/S0038713410001284. ISSN 0038-7134.
- Rubenstein, Jay (2005). "What is the Gesta Francorum, and who was Peter Tudebode?". Revue Mabillon. 16: 179–204. doi:10.1484/J.RM.2.303576. ISSN 0035-3620.
- Rubenstein, Jay (2016). "The Deeds of Bohemond: Reform, Propaganda, and the History of the First Crusade". Viator. 47 (2): 113–135. doi:10.1484/J.VIATOR.5.111229. ISSN 0083-5897.
- Symes, Carol (2017-05-01). "Popular Literacies and the First Historians of the First Crusade*". Past & Present (235): 37–67. doi:10.1093/pastj/gtx014. ISSN 0031-2746.
