= Afghanistan Rugby Federation =

Governing body of rugby in Afghanistan

- Sport: Rugby union
- Founded: 2011
- Asia Rugby affiliation: 2020
- President: Haris Rahmani

The Afghanistan Rugby Federation (ARF) is the governing body of rugby in Afghanistan.

== History ==
The organization was founded in 2011 and joined Asia Rugby as an associate member in 2012, before achieving full membership status in 2020. As of 2026 they are not yet members of World Rugby or run any full national teams.

== See also ==
- Rugby union in Afghanistan
- Afghanistan national rugby sevens team
