= Jigger Johnson =

American lumberjack (1871–1935)

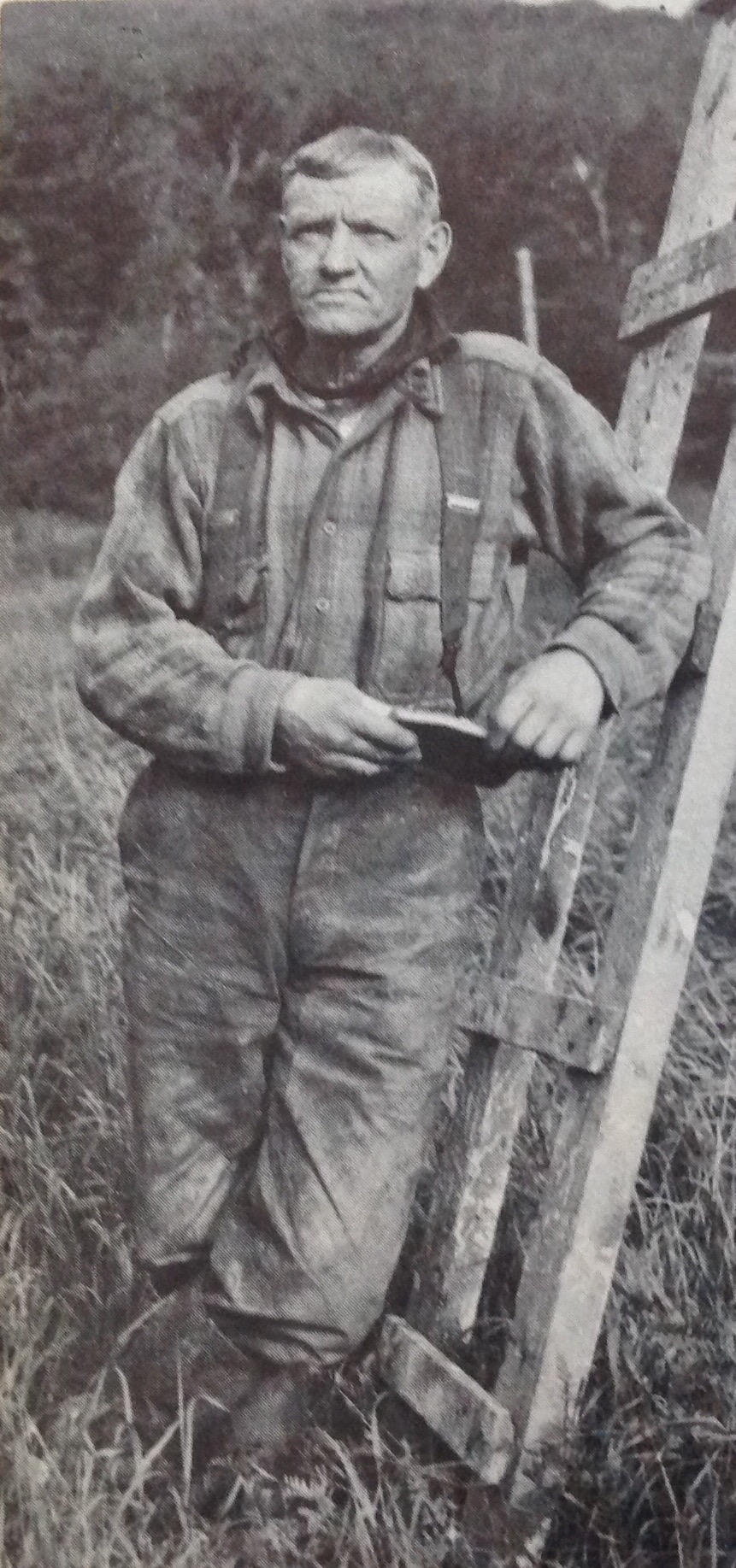
- Johnson in 1922
- Born: Albert Lewis Johnson; May 12, 1871; Fryeburg, Maine, U.S.
- Died: March 30, 1935 (aged 63); North Conway, New Hampshire, U.S.
- Occupations: Lumberjack, fire warden, trapper

Albert Lewis Johnson (May 12, 1871 – March 30, 1935), better known as Jigger Johnson (also nicknamed Wildcat Johnson, Jigger Jones, or simply The Jigger), was a legendary logging foreman, trapper, and fire warden for the U.S. Forest Service who was known throughout the American East for his many off-the-job exploits, such as catching bobcats alive barehanded, and drunken brawls.

Logging historians, such as Stewart Holbrook, Robert Pike, and others, have called him "the last lumberjack" of the old-fashioned type who "cut a swath of timber from Maine to Oregon" and "yelled like crazy devils every spring when they pounded the bars in Bangor, Saginaw, St. Paul, and Seattle".

The U.S. Forest Service maintains the Jigger Johnson Campground in the White Mountain National Forest, which they named in honor of him.

== Early life ==
Albert "Jigger" Johnson was born on May 12, 1871, in Fryeburg, Maine, to parents of Yankee stock. According to legend, when Jigger was born he came out of his mother's womb with a wad of tobacco in his lip, caulk boots on his feet, and a peavey in one hand and an axe in the other. Another legend states that he only had two formal days of schooling. On the first day, the Jigger forgot his books, and on the second day the teacher was out sick.

At the young age of 12, he went to work in the woods as a "cookee", or cook's assistant, at a lumber camp in Milan, New Hampshire. Jigger's duties as cookee required him to help the cook prepare food, serve the loggers their meals, clean the dishes after mealtime, and to chop fire wood during any spare time.

During meals, it was forbidden for the loggers to converse with one another; they were expected to finish eating as quickly as possible and get back to cutting wood. One evening, a few newcomers decided to talk during dinner, and continued to talk after the young Jigger politely asked them to stop. One logger started arguing with the boy Jigger, and the next thing the loggers knew was that the youth had jumped onto the fully grown man and sunk his teeth into his ear. After the other men separated the two, part of the man's ear remained in Jigger's mouth.

The other loggers were so impressed that a young boy would even attempt to take on a fully grown man that they all combined a portion of their wages and bought the Jigger a can of chewing tobacco. Later loggers would say that because of this, men who fought Jigger would never get their caulk boots near his face, due to fear of his teeth—Jigger claimed he could chew "though boot, hide, an' all."

== Logging career ==
The young Jigger soon worked his way up the ranks in the woods—swamping roads, tending landing, and chopping, to eventually emerge at the age of 20 as head chopper in charge of a logging camp somewhere on the Androscoggin River. Old loggers who worked for him, such as Stewart Holbrook, claimed that Johnson had few equals as a woodsman at a time when a man working in the woods was judged by the smoothness of the scarf of his axe’s undercut. They said that the Jigger was an unusually good logger and that he could fell a tree uphill, downhill, with or against the wind, even so that upon falling it would drive a stake previously set in the ground.

Johnson worked for many years as a logging foreman in the woods of Coös County, New Hampshire, for the Connecticut Valley Lumber Company (C.V.L.) in the winter, and as a river boss on the Connecticut River in the spring. Robert E. Pike claimed in his 1967 book Tall Trees, Tough Men that whenever Jigger entered the camp of a new logging operation, for his resume he would exclaim, "I can jump higher, squat lower, turn sideways quicker, and spit further than any son-of-a-bitch in a camp."

As a foreman, Jigger was known to have kicked off the knots of a frozen hemlock log barefooted, and supposedly wouldn't hire anyone else who couldn't do the same. He was well known to be an honest, hardworking boss, who would pay his men high wages to work for him. He would walk into saloons at Berlin, New Hampshire, and Sherbrooke, Quebec, and could convince drunken loggers to work for him driving logs down the most dangerous parts of the Connecticut River.

Although he paid his men handsomely, he expected a lot from them. On one occasion during a river drive, Jigger told his men to wait at camp while he went to recruit more log drivers in West Stewartstown, New Hampshire. Some of his workers disobeyed his orders and went down to the Line House on the Beecher Falls–East Hereford Border Crossing. Once he returned to camp, Jigger realized at once where the missing men had gone and immediately left for the Line House.

Upon entering the Line House, the Jigger grabbed a peavey that was hung on the wall, and ran into the crowd swinging. The bouncer, a bulky French-Canadian by the name of Lapointe, then knocked Johnson to the ground and began stomping him with his cork boots. Jigger managed to grab a hold of Lapointe's feet and lifted him up and placed him onto a hot wood stove and held him there for a few minutes, all the while Lapointe bellowed. When Jigger finally let up, he proceeded to jump into the air and grabbed a hold of a kerosene lamp from the ceiling and smashed it over the bouncer's head. The kerosene met the heat and ignited Lapointe's clothes. Lapointe ran outside, still ablaze, and had to be put out by bystanders, while Jigger's frightened men returned to camp.

In his younger years, Jigger Johnson boasted that he would not leave any tree standing from Bangor to Seattle, nor any virgins. He trekked from New England all the way to the Great Lakes States and then to the great pine forests of the Southeast, before deciding to turn back to New England due to a sprained ankle and stomach problems.

Johnson worked on the Connecticut River for the C.V.L. until 1915, when the last long-log drive occurred. He then continued to work for the remainder of his logging career on the Androscoggin River. Sensing that the long-log drives were coming to an end, Jigger retired from working in the woods in the early 1920s.

== Fire warden and the Civilian Conservation Corps ==
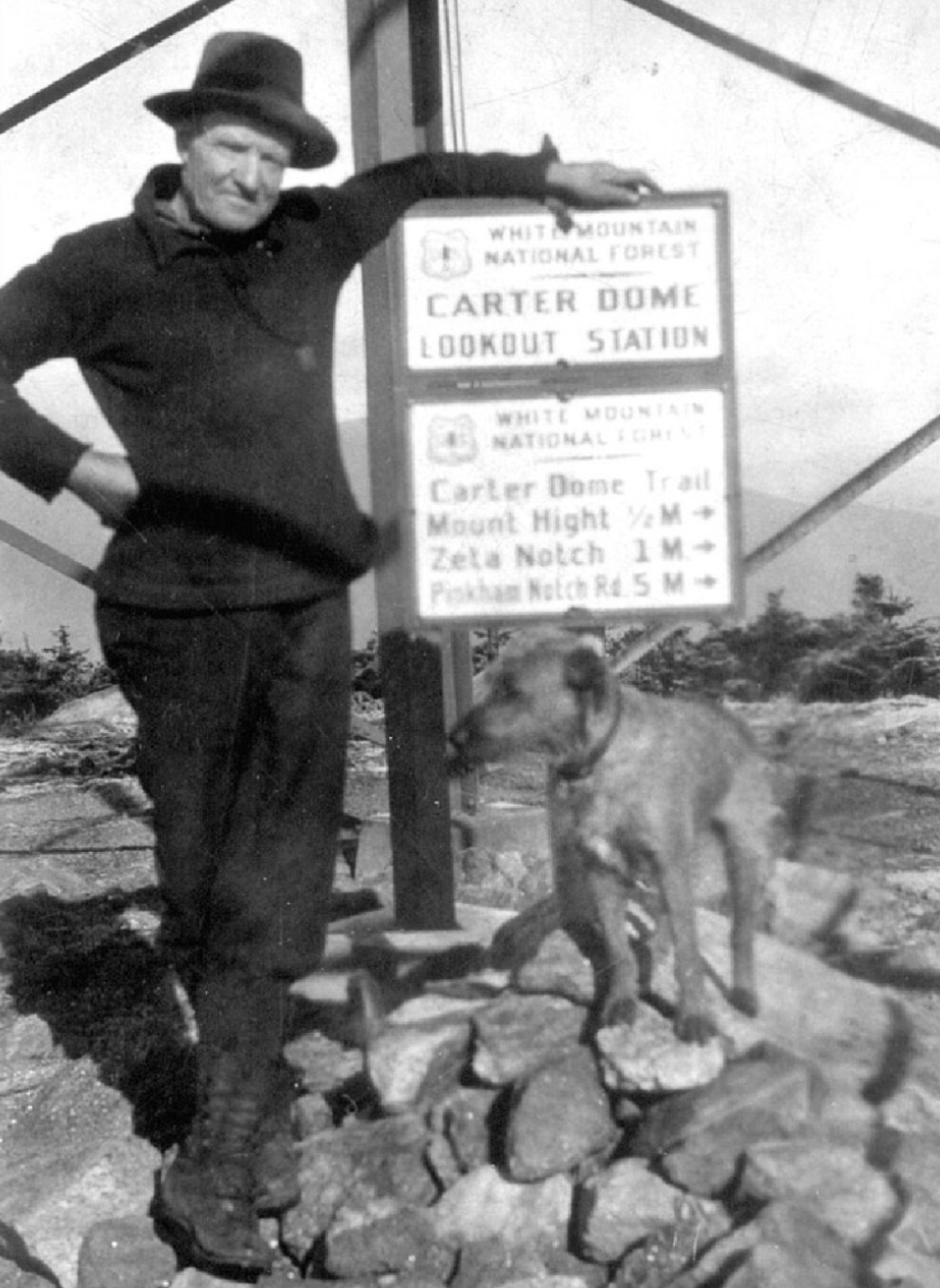
Jigger Johnson as a fire warden on Carter Dome

Shortly after the end of his logging career, Jigger Johnson found a profession as a fire warden for the United States Forest Service and was stationed at their lookout tower on Mount Chocorua, and later at Carter Dome. It was there that Johnson, when sober, looked for forest fires. On days when he drank, mostly when the weather was rainy, he clogged up the telephone lines with reports of bizarre snakes and small dragons, a rare condition caused by extreme alcohol abuse known as alcoholic hallucinosis.

On one occasion while the Jigger worked on Carter Dome, he and a friend, Robert Monahan, set off from "The Dome" to Berlin to replenish his potato supply and to stock up on bootlegged hard liquor. When they reached the town of Gorham, they stumbled upon a celebration that included a potato race. Bob and Jigger banded together and won the race, with the prize being a half-bushel of fresh potatoes. He and Monahan then lugged the sack of potatoes up to Carter Dome, where the two men had a feast.

After the Forest Service was forced to let him go due to his drinking, Johnson was hired to man a privately owned fire tower on Bald Mountain in Maine. However, this job did not last too long due to a conflagration that burnt down the tower, which was caused by one of Jigger's homemade alcohol stills exploding.

After this, Jigger was hired to teach survival skills for the Civilian Conservation Corps (CCC) in Gilead, Maine. It is there that the Jigger entranced the young men with his tales of old. The CCC, like the Forest Service, was forced to relieve him because of his heavy alcohol consumption, which forced the Jigger into finally deciding to go into self-employment as a trapper of wild game.

== Trapper ==
Jigger's final job before his death was fur trapping. He erected a crude cabin in the White Mountain National Forest near Douglas Brook in Albany, New Hampshire. As a trapper, Johnson was known to have been somewhat of a one-man Hudson's Bay Company, catching lynx, bobcat, mink, muskrat, weasel, fox, and fisher, often alive and with nothing but his own hands.

Once, the Jigger used a deer carcass to lure two bobcats under a tree that he had climbed. While the bobcats were having their feast, Johnson pounced on them and bagged them, live, barehanded. One of these cats was sold to the University of New Hampshire, which wanted a wildcat for use as a mascot, for the sum of $50.

On another occasion, a man from Portland, Maine, asked the Jigger if he could catch him two bobcats for a show he was doing, and if he could, he would pay him $25. Jigger agreed, and captured two bobcats and tied their feet together and started out for the train station, occasionally hitting their heads together to keep them quiet. Johnson asked the stationmaster how much it would cost to ship the cats to Portland, and after about ten minutes, the stationmaster revealed to Jigger that there wasn't any tariff on shipping bobcats, and thus he could not ship them. Johnson ended up hiring a taxi driver to drive him to Portland, and he hand delivered the cats himself.

== Death ==
After selling a lynx pelt for the sum of $100, the Jigger went to the town of Conway to celebrate. The next morning, after realizing he had not checked his traps in over 24 hours (as state laws required), Johnson hired a man to drive him back to Passaconaway. The car ended up sliding off the road just as the Jigger was about to get out of the car, pinning him to a tree. Jigger was taken to the Memorial Hospital in Conway, where he died on March 30, 1935.

== Legacy ==
Following his death, Jigger Johnson was made famous by writers, such as Stewart Holbrook and Robert Pike, for his extraordinary intuition, tolerance to cold weather, ability to consume massive amounts of any proof alcohol, and his enormous strength. It is through the recounting of the Jigger's numerous off-the-job exploits by these historians that the Jigger has become somewhat of an American folk hero.

In the 1940 Warner Brothers film King of the Lumberjacks, there is a character played by Joe Sawyer named "Jigger", who is loosely based on Jigger Johnson.

In 1969, the United States Forest Service opened the Jigger Johnson Campground in the White Mountain National Forest, near where the Jigger once trapped.
