= Sport of Kings =

Sport of Kings (King Sports) may refer to:

- One of several sports historically associated with royalty or nobility:
  - Hunting, especially the following kinds:
    - Mounted hunting with hounds, e.g. fox hunting
    - Hunting with hounds on foot, e.g. beagling and montería
    - Falconry
    - Deer stalking
    - Game (hunting)
      - Big–game hunting
        - Big five game
  - Polo
  - Chovgan
  - Jereed
  - Buzkashi
  - Real tennis
  - Horse racing
- Archery
  - Bow and arrow
- Extreme and adventure sports are activities perceived as involving a high degree of risk of injury or death, that require attention, cold blood and courage.
- Sport of Kings (film), 1947 American film
- The Sport of Kings (1921 film), British silent sports film
- The Sport of Kings (1931 film), British comedy
- The Sport of Kings (album), album by Triumph
- The Sport of Kings (novel), a 2016 novel by C. E. Morgan
- The Sport of Kings (play), a 1924 play by Ian Hay
- Sport of Kings, album by English band Pele
- Chess
