= Rugby union in Afghanistan =

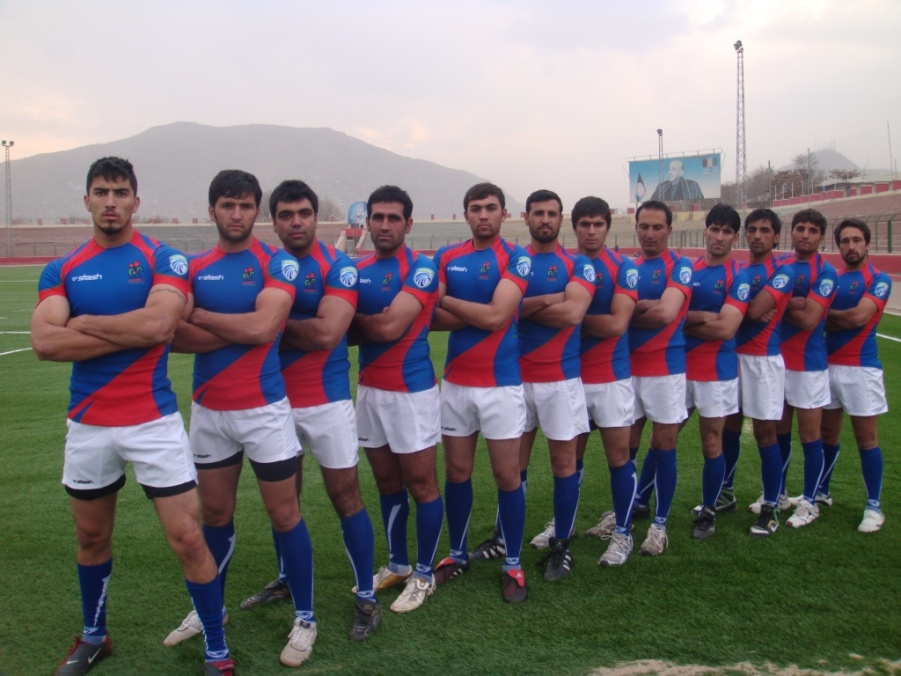
- Posed photograph of the Afghan national team
- Country: Afghanistan
- Governing body: Afghanistan Rugby Federation
- National team: Afghanistan
- First played: Late 19th or early 20th Century

Rugby union is a relatively minor sport in Afghanistan, but is increasing in popularity. Afghanistan's current indigenous rugby sides formed in 2011, and played their first match barefoot against New Zealand troops in Kabul's green zone. The country's first official rugby tournament was organized by Khalil baig who is known as the founder of rugby in Afghanistan and sponsored by the British embassy in December 2011. The Afghan team's first overseas match was played as an exhibition rugby sevens match against the United Arab Emirates national team's development side on 27 April 2012, and played in the Bournemouth Sevens Festival at the Bournemouth Sports Club in June 2012.

A sevens national team played its first match in 2018.

== Governing body ==
The Afghanistan Rugby Federation (ARF) registered with the National Olympic Committee, Islamic Republic Of Afghanistan, in 2010. The Beginning for Afghanistan Mr. Khalil Baig and Mr. Mohammad Mansoor agreed in October 2010 to introduce rugby to Afghans. Rugby came into existence in Afghanistan in May 2011, and it was first introduced through a Rugby Introductory Camp, sponsored by a shopping Mall called “ Majid Mall.” About the founders: Khalil baig, the first Chief Executive Officer of Afghanistan Rugby Federation (ARF), lived and worked in Kabul and traveled to far areas in Afghanistan. He worked for the development of education, improving lives of the children, demobilization and re integration of the underage soldiers and many more fields. He earned a Master in Business Administration and Master in Literature. He also completed many technical trainings by humanitarian and other organizations. Mr. Khalil Baig worked voluntarily for Afghanistan Rugby Federation (ARF). Mohammad Mansoor, President of Afghanistan Rugby Federation (ARF), is a well known Afghan businessman. He lives in Dubai, UAE and owns firms and businesses in Dubai and Afghanistan.

Mission

The organization’s aim is to support youth choosing sport against a backdrop of violence and attract a new generation.

Afghanistans Rugby Federation is the official body for the sport of Afghan Rugby and is involved in educating, supporting and enabling young Afghans to excel and compete internationally. The ARF was officially launched in Afghanistan on May 20, 2011.

Afghanistans Rugby Federation (ARF) is in the process of developing into a nationwide organization which will promote the game of rugby, accompanying the spirit of teamwork and fair competition among all age-groups throughout Afghanistan emphasizing the young generation. Khalil baig , Chief Executive Officer states that rugby will only thrive if it becomes a game played by a large number of young generations.

== History ==
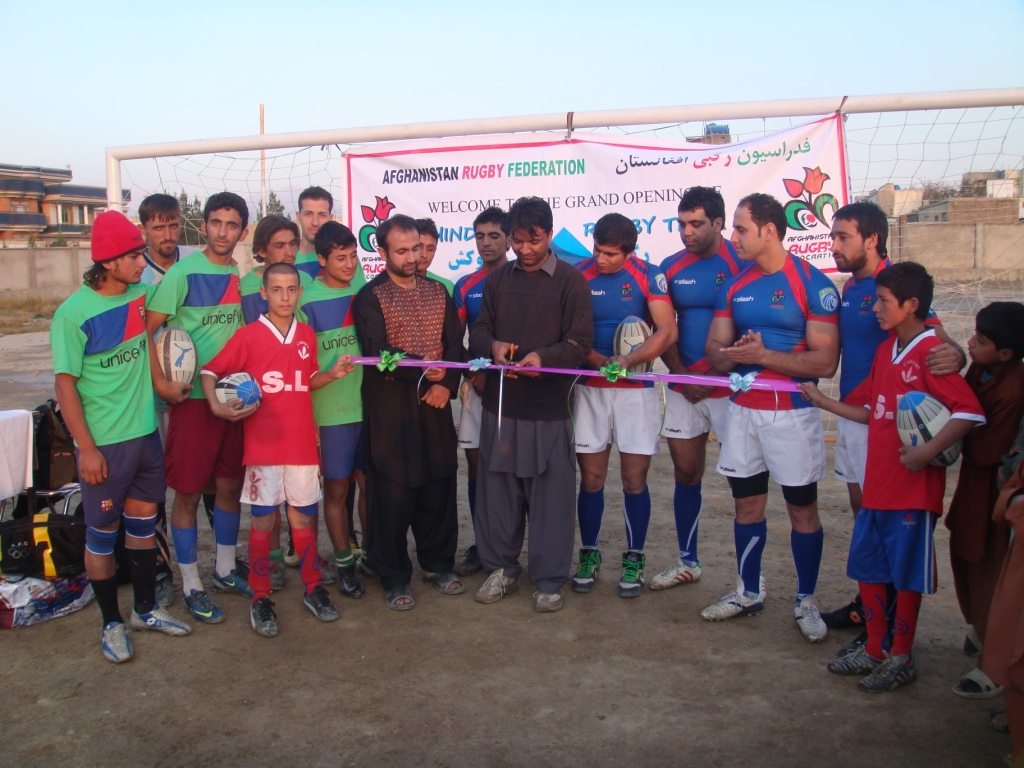
Asad Ziar, Chief Executive Officer, ARF, inaugurating The Hindukush Rugby Club

As with many parts of the world, Afghanistan has indigenous sports which bear some resemblance to rugby. One of these is buzkashi, which has been compared to a cross between rugby and polo, using a dead goat or calf as the ball.

In most of Afghan's history, only foreigners can play Western rugby in Afghanistan. The game was first introduced into the country from British India and was played by British troops. After the British left Asia, the game all but died in Afghanistan. Following the 2001 invasion of Afghanistan, rugby was reintroduced by foreign forces, being played amongst NATO and Australian soldiers on their bases.

== Gallery ==
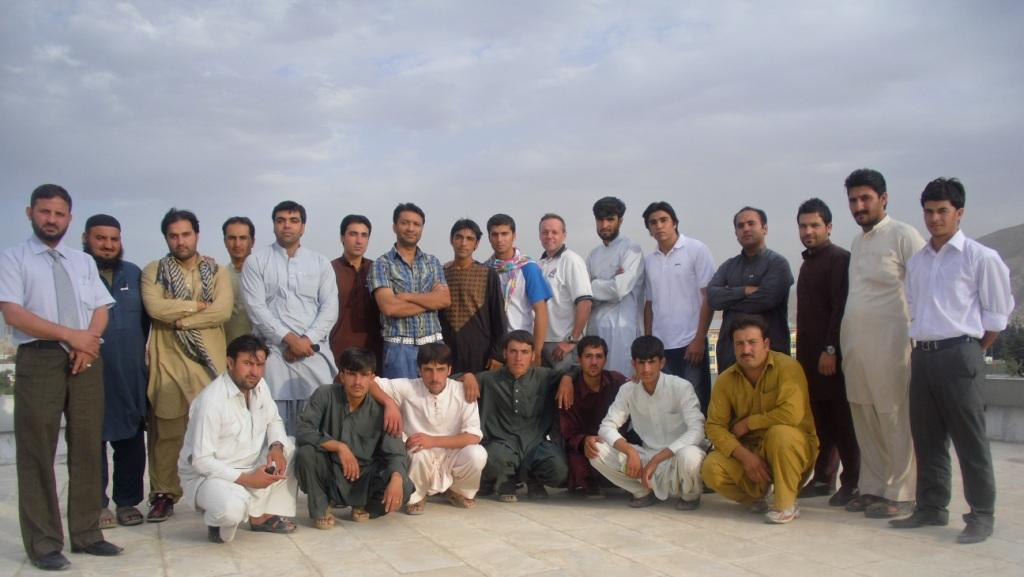
Meeting of Rugby union in Afghanistan

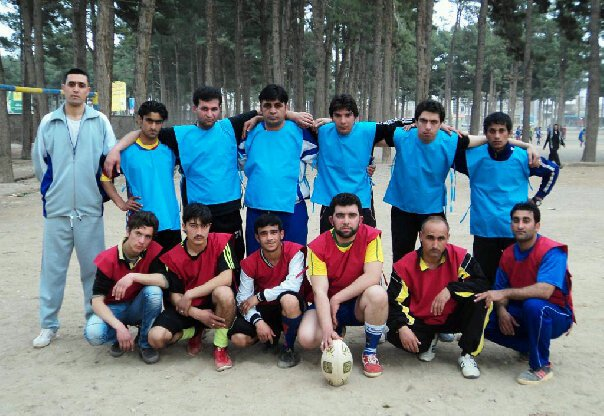
Herat Rugby Squad

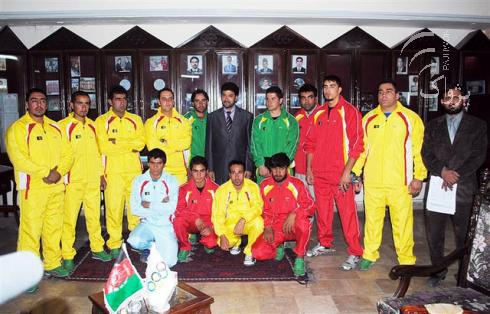
The President of NOC with Afghan Rugby Players and Vice President of ARF

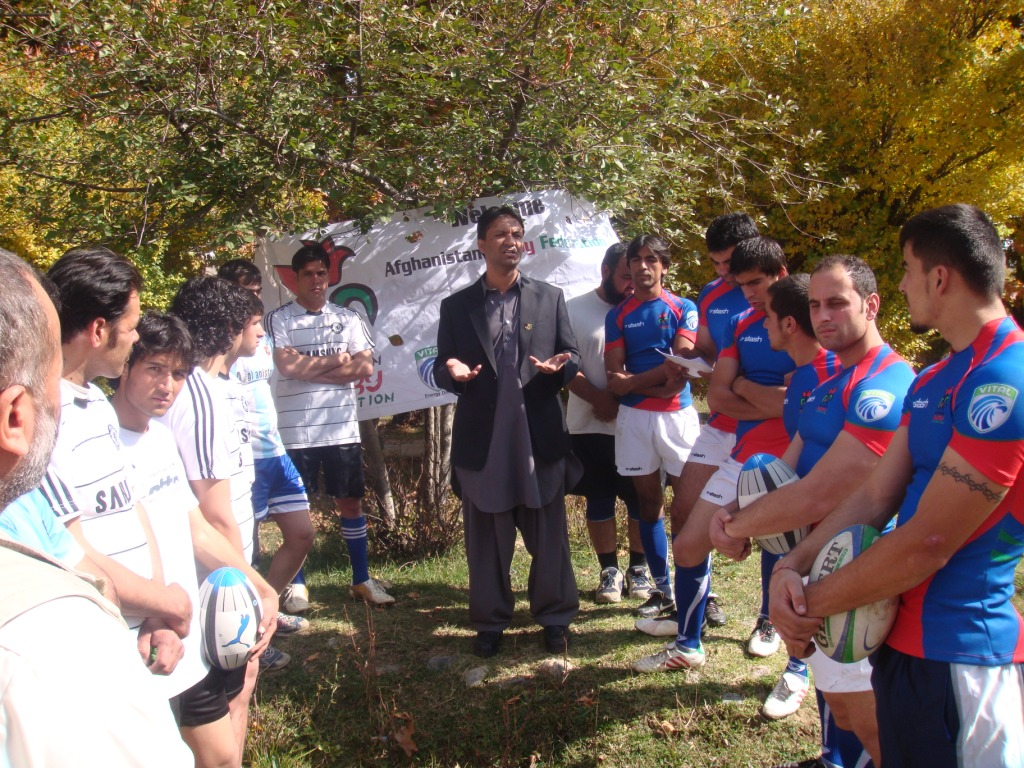

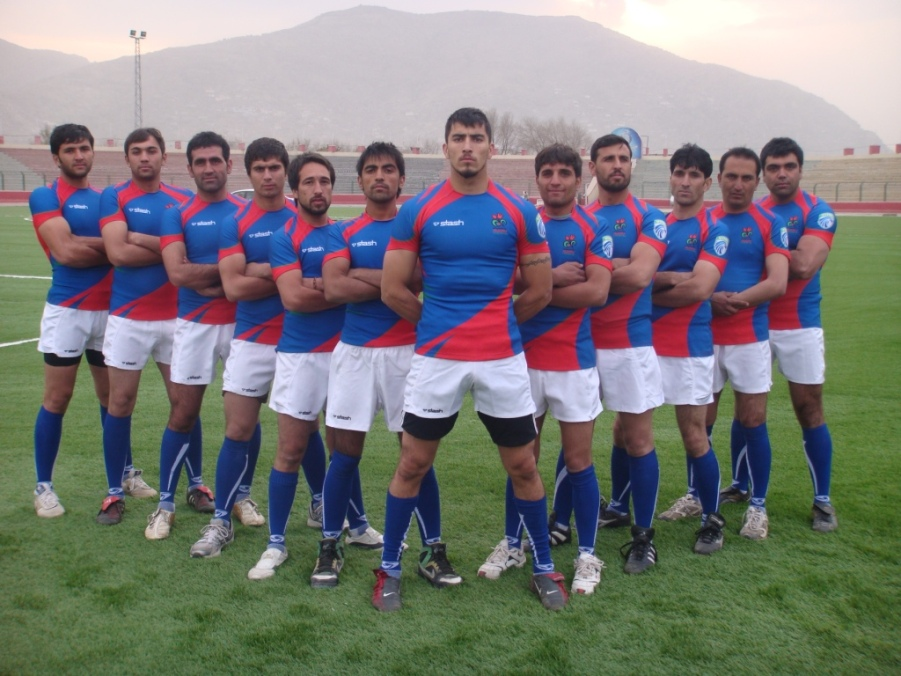
Afghan Rugby Squad
