= Chovgan =

Horse-riding game

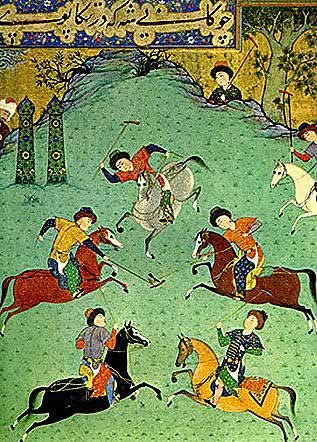
- Chowgan in a Persian miniature from Tabriz, Iran of the 16th century (from Arifi's "Ball and club" manuscript)
- Players: 6
- Playing time: 30 minutes

Chovqan, a traditional Karabakh horse-riding game in the Republic of Azerbaijan
- UNESCO Intangible Cultural Heritage
- Country: Azerbaijan
- Reference: 00905
- Region: Europe and North America

Inscription history
- Inscription: 2013 (8th session)
- List: Need of Urgent Safeguarding

Chogān, a horse-riding game accompanied by music and storytelling
- UNESCO Intangible Cultural Heritage
- Country: Iran
- Reference: 01282
- Region: Asia and the Pacific

Inscription history
- Inscription: 2017 (12th session)
- List: Representative

Chovgan (Note: Also rendered as Chawgan, Chowgan or Chogan.) (Persian: چوگان, romanized: čawgân) is a team sport with horses that originated in ancient Iran (Persia). It was considered an aristocratic game and held in a separate field, on specially trained horses. It is played in Iran, Azerbaijan, Tajikistan, and Uzbekistan. It is a predecessor of modern polo.

== History ==
Chovgan originated in ancient Iran and was a Persian national sport played extensively by the nobility. Chovgan originated in the middle of the first millennium A.D., as a team game. It was popular during the centuries in the Middle East. Fragments of the game were periodically portrayed in ancient miniatures, and detailed descriptions and rules of the game were also given in the ancient manuscripts. Some authors give dates as early as the 5th century BC (or earlier) to the 1st century AD for its origin by the Persians. During the period of the Parthian Empire (247 BC - 224 AD), the sport enjoyed great patronage under the kings and noblemen. According to The Oxford Dictionary of Late Antiquity, chovgan (known as čowgān in Middle Persian), was a Persian ball game and an important pastime in the court of the Sasanian Empire (224–651). It was also part of royal education for the Sasanian ruling class. Emperor Shapur II learned to play chovgan when he was seven years old in 316 AD. Mentions of chovgan also appear in “Khosrow and Shirin”, a poem by the Persian poet Nizami Ganjavi, and in the Turkic epic “Kitabi Dede Korkut”.

Later on chovgan was passed from Persia to other parts of Asia, including the Indian subcontinent and China, where it was popular during the Tang dynasty and frequently depicted in paintings and statues. By the time of the Tang dynasty (618–907), records of chovgan were well-established in China. According to The Oxford Dictionary of Late Antiquity, the popularity of chovgan in Tang China was "bolstered, no doubt, by the presence of the Sasanian court in exile".

From Persia, chovgan spread to the Byzantines (who called it tzykanion), and after the Muslim conquests to the Ayyubid and Mameluke dynasties of Egypt and the Levant, whose elites favored it above all other sports. Notable sultans such as Saladin and Baybars were known to play it and encourage it in their court.

Sultan Qutb al-Din Aibak, a Turkic military slave from present-day Northern Afghanistan who later became Sultan of Delhi, died accidentally in 1210 while playing chovgan; his horse fell, and Aibak was impaled on the pommel of his saddle.

Around 1857, Joseph Sherer, a subaltern in the British Indian Army, encountered Manipuri people in Silchar, India playing sagol kāngjei, derived from chovgan, and sometimes called pulu, the Tibetic name for the ball with which the game was played. The name polo is said to have been derived from the Tibetan word pulu, meaning ball. In 1859, Sherer, Captain Robert Stewart, and seven tea planters set up a club to play the games against the local Manipuris in teams of seven. In 1863, Sherer visited Calcutta, and established the Calcutta Polo Club. Polo spread to England in the 1860s, and the Hurlingham Club established the modern rules by 1875.

=== Chovgan in Iran ===
Chovgan, known as chowkan in the Sasanian Empire (Middle Persian: čowkān), was part of the royal education for the Sasanian ruling class. The neighboring Eastern Romans adopted chovgan from the Sasanians and called it tzykanion, which derives from the Middle Persian word. During the reign of Theodosius II, the Roman imperial court started playing tzykanion in the tzykanisterion (polo stadium).

Chovgan was, at first, a training game for cavalry units, usually the king's guard or other elite troops. In time chovgan became an Iranian national sport played generally by the nobility. Women as well as men played the game, as indicated by references to the queen and her ladies engaging King Khosrow II Parviz and his courtiers in the 6th century AD. Ferdowsi, the famed Iranian poet-historian, gives several reports of royal chovgan tournaments in his 9th-century epic, Shahnameh (the Book of Kings). In the earliest version, Ferdowsi romanticizes an international match between a Turanian force and the followers of Siyâvash, a legendary Iranian prince from the earliest centuries of the Empire. Ferdowsi also tells of Emperor Shapur II of the Sasanian dynasty of the 4th century, who learned to play chovgan when he was seven years old. Naqsh-e Jahan Square in Isfahan is a polo field which was built by king Abbas I in the 17th century.

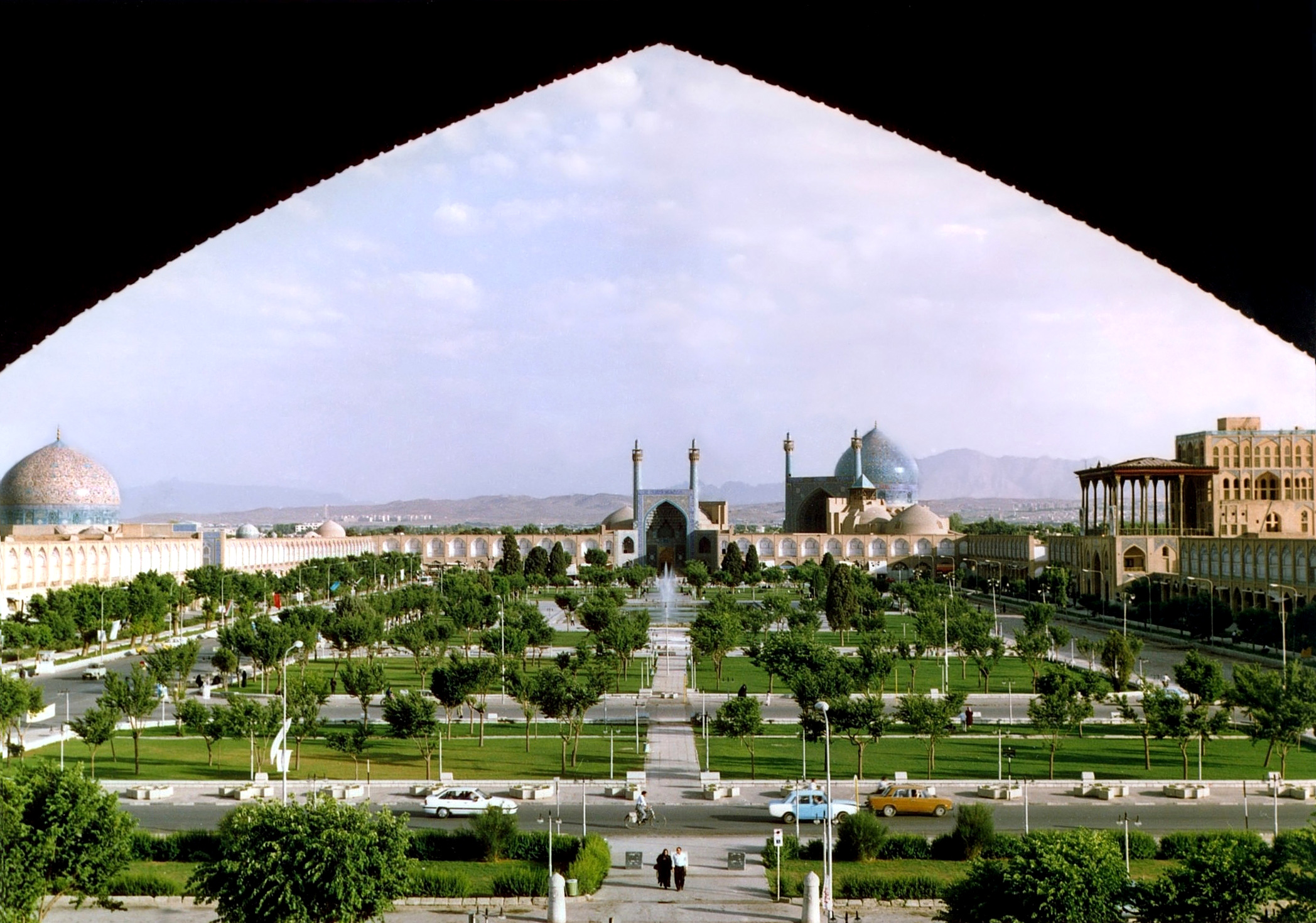
Naqsh-e Jahan Square in Isfahan is the site of a medieval royal polo field.

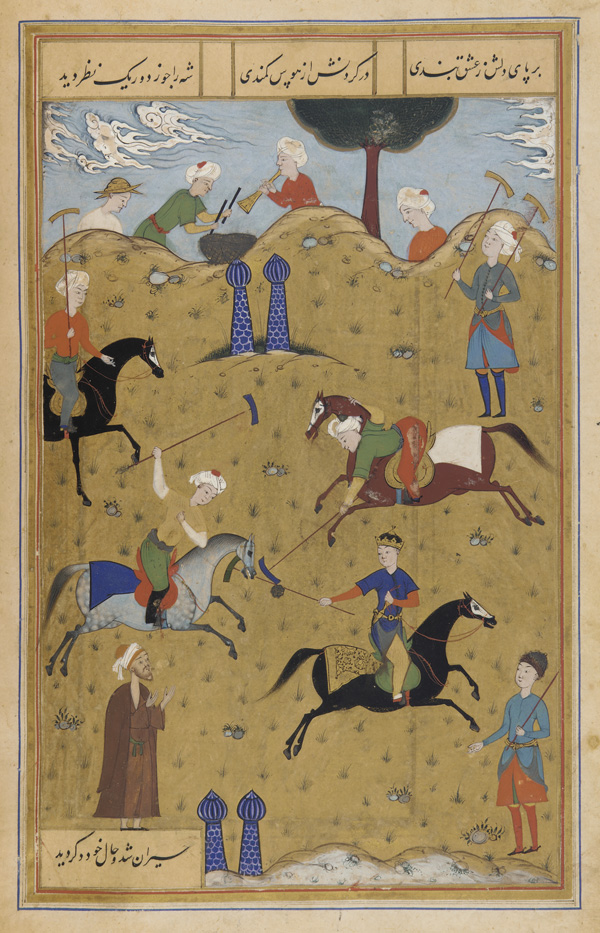
A Safavid era Persian miniature from the poem Guy-o Chawgân ("the Ball and the Polo-mallet"), showing courtiers on horseback playing a game of chovgan, 1546 AD

In 2017, Chogān in the Islamic Republic of Iran was included in the UNESCO Cultural Heritage List.Chogān is an Iranian traditional horse-riding game accompanied by music and storytelling. It has a history of over 2,000 years in Iran and has mostly been played in royal courts and urban fields.

=== Chovgan in Azerbaijan ===
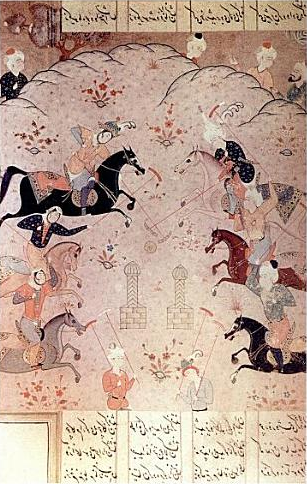
A 16th century miniature depicts a chovgan game in the story of Khosrow and Shirin of Nizami Ganjavi

In Azerbaijan, chovqan (Azerbaijani: Çövkən) is considered a national sport. Various antique prints and ceramics suggest that the sport has a long history there. For example, a vessel with fragment pictures of a chovgan game was found during archaeological excavations in the Oran-Gala area, suggesting indirectly that the game existed during the 11th century around Beylagan city.

In the Azerbaijani version of the game, two teams strive to score a goal with special clubs. Rules in the modern edition of the game are the following: two goals with a width of 3 meters with semi-circled areas with a radius of 6 meters are fixed in enough big place. The game was held with a rubber or woven leather belt ball. Clubs can be different in form. In Azerbaijan, the clubs are reminiscent of a shepherd's crook. There are six riders in each team, 4 of whom act as attackers and two as fullbacks. The latter can play only in their half of the area. The players are mounted on the local Karabakh horse. Goals can be scored behind the borders of the penalty area. The duration of the game is 30 minutes in two periods. The game is interspersed with instrumental folk music called janghi.

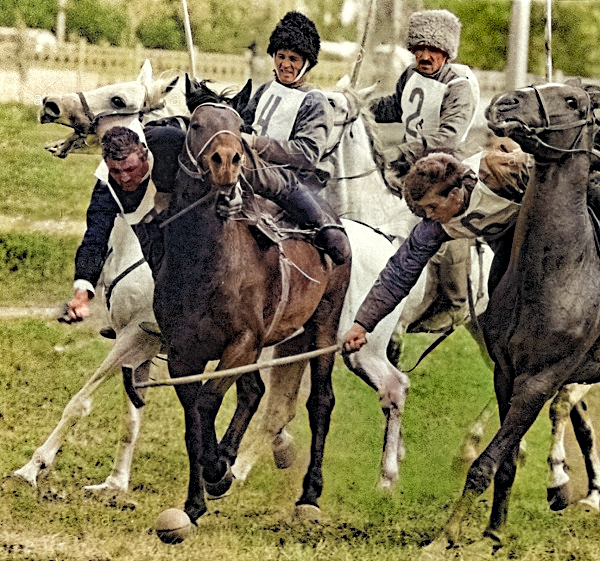
Azerbaijani chovgan players in 12th All Union Cup

In 1979, a documentary called “Chovgan game”, shot by Azerbaijan's Jafar Jabbarly film studio recorded the sport's rules and historical development. However, overall the Soviet era saw a decline of the sport to near 'oblivion' and the dislocations of the immediate post-Soviet period proved difficult for the breeding of horses. In recent years, however, the sport has rebounded somewhat. Since 2006, Azerbaijan has held a national tournament in December known as the President's Cup at the Republican Equestrian Tourism Center, at Dashyuz near Shaki. The first of these, held from December 22–25, 2006, pitted teams from eight cities of Azerbaijan – Shaki, Aghdam, Ağstafa, Balakən, Qakh, Gazakh, Oğuz, and Zagatala with those from Aghstafa taking overall victory.

In 2013, chovqan was included in the UNESCO list of Intangible Cultural Heritage in need of urgent safeguarding. In 2024, The International Chovgan Federation (ICF) was established in Baku.

== See also ==
- Chowgan ground
- Chowgan, Kermanshah
- International Chovgan Federation (IGF) for Chovgan established on 2 February 2024
- Buzkashi
- Jereed
- Sagol kāngjei
- Polo
- Archery
  - Bow and arrow
- List of extreme and adventure sports
- Sport of Kings
