= Aziz Ahmad (buzkashi) =

Afghani sportsman

Personal information
- Citizenship: Afghanistan

Sport
- Sport: Buzkashi

Aziz Ahmad (born c. 1964) is a professional Buzkashi player from Afghanistan.

Ahmad was born in a farming village in northern Kunduz to a poor family. He began playing Buzkashi at age 15. At the time that he began playing, Buzkashi was a rite of passage for young men in the Kunduz region.

At the age of 18, he was conscripted by the military of the Democratic Republic of Afghanistan during the Soviet–Afghan War. He soon defected from the government military to join the Mujahideen.

Ahmad initially left Kabul and returned to Kunduz after the 1992 Civil war began. His playing skill soon drew the attention of Mohammed Fahim, who was then a powerful warlord. Fahim offered to sponsor him if he returned to play in Kabul and chartered a helicopter to bring him back. Ahmad remained in Kabul until leaving the city in 1996 shortly before it fell to the Taliban, who then banned buzkashi. He returned to the north and joined the Northern Alliance to fight against the Taliban in the ensuing Civil war.

After the fall of the Taliban during the 2001 War in Afghanistan, Ahmad returned to his Buzkashi career and soon became known as the best living player.
