= Djerid (weapon) =

Type of throwing spear

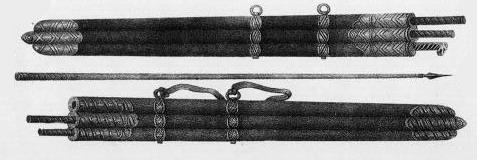
Russian djerids and quiver

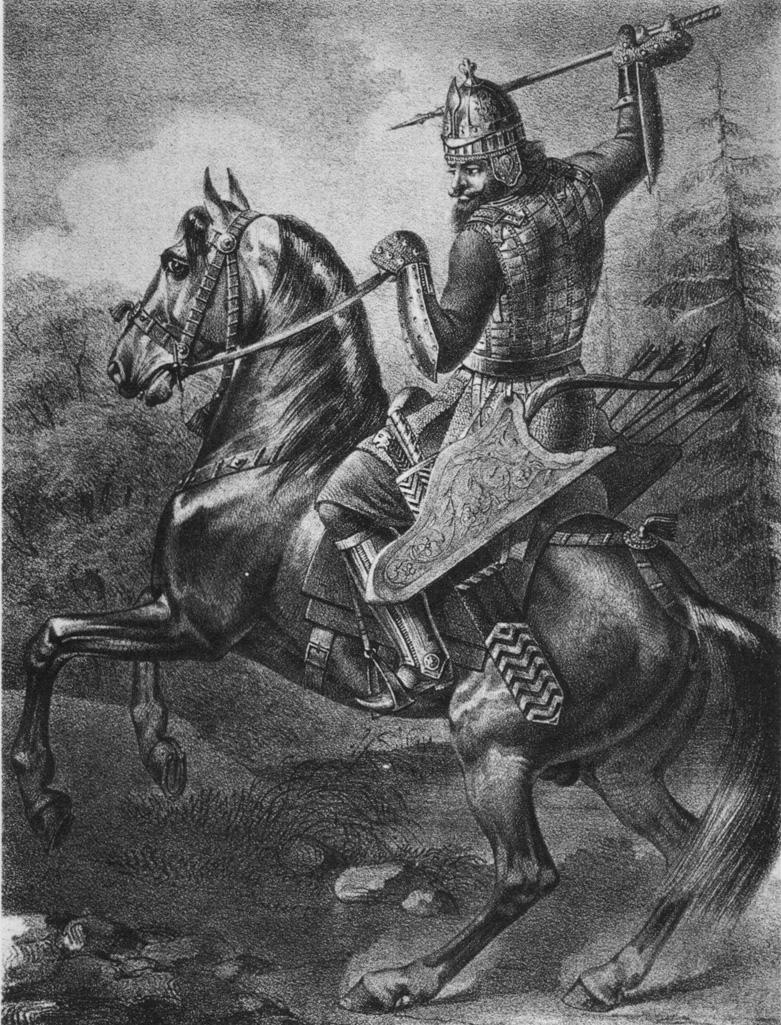
Russian military rider with one djerid in the hand and two more in quiver on the belt

Djerid (also jarid, jered) is a type of throwing spear ~1 m (3 ft 3 in) in length, usually with a wooden haft and small steel head, but sometimes it's entirely made of steel and used for hunting and warfare. The weapon is of Arab origin and were used in Northern Africa, Western Asia, Southern Asia, and Eastern Europe. Occasionally, several of these were carried in a quiver, either on horseback or on foot.

It became the namesake of the traditional jereed game involving throwing djerids on horseback, and was popularised during the Ottoman Empire. It was observed being played by the Pasha of Jerusalem and his officers and attendants by Lt. William Francis Lynch in the 19th century:

"A single horseman would leave his ranks, cross the intervening space, and ride leisurely along in front of the opposite line, when, selecting his opponent, he quickly threw his djerid, or short, blunted, wooden spear, directly at him. The latter, generally dodging the weapon, immediately started in hot pursuit of his antagonist, who, now unarmed, spurred his horse towards his friends, and, to avoid the threatened blow, threw himself nearly from the stead, hanging by one leg .... If the assailed were struck with the first cast, one of his party pursued the assailant; and if successful in striking him, it became his turn to flee from an adversary."

A different mounted combat game, the Jarid Bazi, was played by the Biluchis, but here the jarid is described as a long spear.
