= Jereed =

Traditional Turkish equestrian team sport

Jereed, known by the name Equestrian Javelin (also jerreed, jerid, or jerrid; Turkish: Cirit) is a traditional Turkish equestrian team sport played outdoors on horseback in which the objective is to score points by throwing a blunt wooden javelin, or stick, at opposing team's horsemen. Played by Turkic peoples in Central Asia as the essential sporting and ceremonial game, it was brought to Anatolia during the westward migration in the beginning of the 11th century.

== History ==
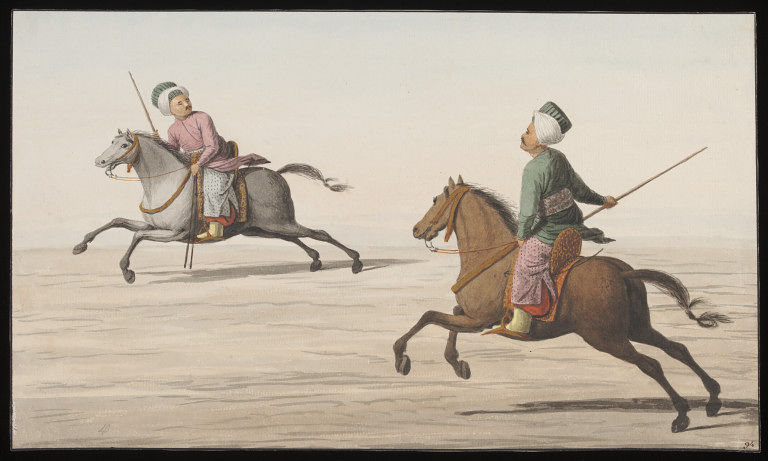
Ottoman horsemen exercising in jereed, c. 1800

Horses have been essential and even sacred animals for Turks living as nomadic tribes in the Central Asian steppes. Turks were born, grew up, lived, fought and died on horseback. So became jereed the most important sporting and ceremonial game of Turkish people. The term itself is an Arabic word (جريد) that refers to a javelin or stick made from stripped palm fronds.

Jereed came to Anatolia with Turks as they migrated in 1071 from their homelands in Central Asia. Later in the 16th century, Ottoman Turks accepted it as a wargame, and it widespread from that time onwards. In peacetime, jereed was played to improve the cavalry's attack and defense skills, and during campaigns to whip up their enthusiasm for battle. Some of the Ottoman sultans are known to have been jereed players, and early sultans like Bayezid I (1389–1402) and Mehmed I (1413–1421) attached importance to jereed in the training of their armies. A superior class of cavalrymen known as "cündi" was formed from those skilled at jereed. It spread over to Arabia and European countries and, was enjoyed in German and French language speaking territories in the 17th century.

In the 19th century, it gained its highest popularity as a show sport and game at the court and in all Ottoman ruled territories. However, the game was not without danger, and injuries and even death from fall-offs in the attempt to catch the flying jereed sticks prompted Mahmud II (1808–1839) in 1826 to ban the sport after he dissolved the Janissary Corps. Although playing jereed resumed before long, particularly in the provinces, it never recovered the importance of former times.

Today, jereed is not as widespread as it once was, but is still enjoyed as a spectator sport, primarily in Erzurum and Bayburt, but also in the eastern provinces of Artvin, Erzincan, Kars, in the western provinces of Uşak, Balıkesir, Söğüt, in the southeastern provinces of Diyarbakır, Siirt and in the Central Anatolian province of Konya. Cultural folkloric societies are also attempting to keep this traditional sport alive by organizing local tournaments. Around 50 clubs in nine provinces in Turkey organize jereed tournaments.

== Game and rules ==
Alawites practicing jereed in Kerdaha while Ottoman soldiers spectate, from the 1879 travelogue of Léon Cahun

Jereed is a means of improving equestrian skills, and involves two teams of horsemen, each armed with dried oak or poplar sticks. The sticks with rubber-tipped, blunt ends are 70–100 cm in length and 2–3 cm in diameter. Originally, the sticks were heavier and thicker, however in order to reduce the risk of injury, players came to prefer sticks made of poplar, which become lighter when dried.

The teams are formed by six, eight or twelve players, standing on opposite sides of a field marked within a square of 70 to 130 meters. There are three "end zones" of about six meters deep at each end of the field, being a team's waiting area, thus meaning a neutral zone and the opposing team's throwing area. Each team has its own flag. The horses should not be younger than four years of age. A medium height horse is preferred because tall horses are not quick to maneuver, therefore most suitable ones are Arabian and Turkoman horses.

The Jereed game begins with introduction of the players to the spectators with words of praise, followed by handshakes at center field and a parade of each team with its flag. Meanwhile, drums and zurnas (reed pipes) play Ottoman military marches and Köroğlu folk music.

Riders test the field and their horses, than go back to their section. Jereed players in traditional regional costumes, a remembrance of the Sipahis (Ottoman cavalrymen), mount their local breed horses, specially trained for this sport. The teams line up facing one another on the field, each player at a distance of about 10 meters from the next. With their right hand, they hold the first jereed that they will throw while holding other jereed in their left hand.

At the beginning of the game, it is traditional for the youngest rider to trot towards the opposing team, shout the name of a player and at a distance of 30 to 40 meters toss his jereed at that player challenging him to enter the game. Then, he gallops back to his side, meanwhile the challenged player pursues him and throws a jereed at the fleeing player. Another player from the first team comes out and meets the retreating rider. The player from the second team starts riding quickly to his corner and takes his former place. This time, his rival chases him and throws a jereed at him. The fast-charging chase game goes on in two 45-minute periods.

This process of chasing and fleeing, while trying to hit an opponent with a stick, is the essence of the game, which requires skill and sportsmanship. To hit the horse instead of the rider, which is regarded as a sign of inexperience, is against the rules, and causes the offender to be sent off the field.

The referees, who are former jereed players with standing in the community, count the number of hits and at the end of the game announce the winning team. Experienced jereed players rarely miss hitting an opponent, and are skilled at avoiding hits themselves by performing acrobatics on horseback. Part of the skill lies in training the horses so that they play a significant role in the outcome of the game. The formation of the two teams has its traditional etiquette. Care is taken not to put players, who are on bad terms in opposing teams, and players, who display deliberately hostile behavior during a match are blacklisted.

A player wins points when he manages to hit his rival with the stick, or ride him out, or catch an incoming jereed in mid-air. He will get negative points for actions that might endanger the horse, such as riding out of bounds or striking a horse intentionally; falling off his horse; throwing the stick from inside the neutral zone; or throwing from closer than five meters during pursuit. Referees posted at the center line and at each end of the field award both positive and negative points with their flags.

The players make several different defensive maneuvers in order to avoid being hit by leaning towards either side of the horse, under the horse's stomach or even its neck. Some players score more points by hitting his opponent three or four times before that player manages to escape and take his place back in his row. Jereed boys run across the field to retrieve errant throws and deliver them to the end zones of both sides. Even though today jereed tips are rounded rubber and light, sometimes players might be injured if they are hit on the head, eyes or ears. With today's sticks it is very rare but these injuries might even result in death. If a player dies in the field, he is considered to have lost his life in battle as a martyr and his relatives do not sue against other player, except that a public case is opened by the court and a legal trial is done anyway. Therefore, if there are any known hostilities amongst players they can be left out of the tournament or put in the same team by the elder people of the locality, or by the referees, before the game starts.

At the end of the game, the winner is announced by a council of former jereed players depending on points collected by two teams. Organizers give awards to the winning team and a banquet is held.

== Terminology ==
- Değnek, aka Diğnek or Deynek (stick) - The name given to jereed in some regions.
- Meydan - Flat ground field for playing jereed game.
- Cirit havası (Jereed game music) - One or all of the melodies played with drum or zurna while the jereed game is being played.
- At oynatma havası - Name of the rhythms, melodies for the rhythmic horse dance in the province of Tunceli, played before the jereed game.
- At oyunu - The name of jereed game in the provinces of Tunceli and Muş.
- Aheste (slow gait) - Slowest four-beat walking gait of the horse; usually controlled by the rider.
- Rahvan (amble) - The normal four-beat walking gait of the horse.
- Adeta (walk) - The fastest four-beat walking gait of the horse; also controlled by the rider.
- Tırıs (trot) - A two-beat gait of the horse between the smooth gaits of walk and canter during which the left front and right rear legs leave the ground simultaneously followed by the other two. A bumpy ride, this is the least comfortable gait for the rider.
- Dörtnal (canter) - A three-beat gait of the horse, at one point during which all four legs are suspended in the air.
- Hücum dörtnal (gallop) - The three-beat gait of the horse faster than canter; the fastest gait of a horse. Also called running.
- Acemi (inexperienced) - Player, whose stick touches his rival's horse.
- Sipahi aka Sipah or İspahi (cavalryman) - Soldier mounted on horseback at Ottoman times. This title is also given today to skillful horsemen and successful jereed players.
- Cündi - Very skilled horseman.
- Şehit (martyr) - Horseman, who died in the jereed game.
- Alay - Horsemen of a team in a row formation.
- Atbaşı (head-to-head) - The situation that two horses running in the same line.
- Alay basmak - Penetrating into opponent's line formation by losing control of own horse.

== See also ==
- World Nomad Games
- Djerid (weapon)
- Buzkashi
- Chovgan
- Archery
  - Bow and arrow
- Pasola
- List of extreme and adventure sports
- Sport of Kings
