= Tatikios =

Byzantine general

Tatikios or Taticius (Greek: Τατίκιος, c. 1048 – died after 1110) was an Eastern Roman general of Turkish origin during the reign of Alexios I Komnenos. His name is also rendered as Tetigus, Tatizius, Tatitius, Tatic, or Tetig.

== Origins and early life ==
The father of Tatikios was a "Saracen", probably meaning a Turk, who was captured by Alexios' father John Komnenos and who served as a slave in the Komnenos household. Tatikios and Alexios grew up together. Tatikios is described as an oikogenes of Alexios (that is, "from the same house").

In 1078, before Alexios became emperor, Tatikios accompanied him in battle against his rival Nikephoros Basilakes. During this campaign Tatikios discovered Basilakes' plans for an ambush. When Alexios became emperor in 1081, Tatikios held the office of megas primikerios in the imperial household. Later that year he commanded the "Turks living around Ochrida", perhaps Hungarians at the Battle of Dyrrhachium against Robert Guiscard.

== Military and political career ==
In 1086 Tatikios was sent to Nicaea in an attempt to recapture it from the Seljuks. He was forced to retreat when he learned that Seljuk reinforcements were on their way. Alexios sent Tatikios back with naval assistance from Manuel Boutoumites. Although Tatikios was able to defeat Abu'l Qasim, in Bithynia, he could not recapture the city. At the end of the year Tatikios was recalled and sent to fight the Pechenegs, who were assisting the heretical Manichaeans in revolt against Alexios, near Philippopolis. In 1087 Tatikios commanded the Byzantine right wing in the Battle of Dristra against the Pechenegs, and in 1090 he defeated a small force of 300 Pechenegs while leading the Archontopouloi tagma against them.

In early 1094, Tatikios was placed in charge of guarding Alexios' tent at Pentegostis. Here he discovered the plot of Nikephoros Diogenes, son of the former emperor Romanos IV Diogenes, to kill the emperor. Nikephoros was an old friend of Alexios and Tatikios, therefore Alexios was reluctant to punish him, but it was clear that Nikephoros was ambitious for the throne. Nikephoros was exiled and was eventually blinded. Later in 1094, Tatikios attended the synod of Blachernae which condemned Bishop Leo of Chalcedon, presumably performing some function of security. In the records of this synod Tatikios is given the court title of protoproedros.

In 1095 Tatikios accompanied Alexios in the campaign against the Cumans.

== Role during the First Crusade ==
In 1096 Tatikios defended Constantinople from peasant crusaders who attacked the city after their arrival. In 1097 Tatikios and Tzitas, commanding 2000 peltasts (Byzantine peltasts differed from those used in Ancient Greece), were sent by Alexios to Nicaea to assist the Crusaders in their siege of the city. The Frankish chronicler Albert of Aix says that Tatikios acted as an envoy between the Turks and the crusaders, but according to the more reliable Anna Komnene, he was working with Boutoumites to negotiate the surrender of the city without the Crusaders' knowledge. This caused a deep rift between the Latins and Greeks.

However, Tatikios was ordered to accompany the Crusaders across Anatolia, both as a guide and also to ensure that any former Byzantine territory re-captured was returned to the Empire. After leaving Nicaea, the Crusaders split into two groups. Tatikios accompanied the Norman (under Guiscard's son Bohemond of Taranto, Bohemond's nephew Tancred, and Robert of Normandy) and Flemish (under Robert of Flanders) contingents. The Gesta Francorum records that Tatikios frequently warned the Crusaders of the ferocity of the Turks.

During the siege of Antioch, Raymond of Aguilers writes that Tatikios advised the Crusaders to disperse and capture the surrounding countryside before attacking the city itself, which would also help them avoid a famine (this advice was ignored). In February 1098 he left the siege; according to Anna, who probably talked to Tatikios personally or had access to his reports, Tatikios was informed by Bohemond that the other Crusaders mistrusted him and had threatened his life. Bohemond, on the other hand, spread the rumour that Tatikios was a coward and a traitor, and had fled the army never intending to return, despite his promises to bring back reinforcements and provisions from Constantinople. This is the account preserved in contemporary crusader chronicles, who refer to him as a great enemy and a liar (periurio manet et manebit, according to the Gesta Francorum); Anna's account, of course, may be influenced by her deep prejudice against Bohemond, a long-standing enemy of her father.

The accusation of betrayal against Tatikios appears to be unjustified. The Byzantine general had left his personal possessions in the crusader camp and hence forfeited them. More conclusively, on 4 March 1098, a few weeks after the departure of Tatikios, a fleet bearing food supplies and siege materials for the crusader army outside Antioch arrived at the port of St Simeon. The modern historian Peter Frankopan suggests that Alexios was by now confident enough in the established links between Byzantium and the leaders of the crusade to retain his liaison officer in Constantinople for other duties.

== Appearance and descendants ==
The Crusade chroniclers mention that Tatikios had a mutilated nose. Mutilation of the face was a common Byzantine punishment for traitors but this does not appear to be the case in this instance. According to Guibert of Nogent he had a prosthetic gold nose as a replacement. Contrary to the Crusaders' opinions of him, Anna describes him as "a valiant fighter, a man who kept his head under combat conditions," and "a clever orator and a powerful man of action." Anna also tells the story that Tatikios and Alexios were playing polo when the general was thrown from his horse and landed on the emperor. Alexios' injured his knee in the incident and was thereafter afflicted by gout. Anna does not mention the date of this incident; it is an aside in her account of Alexios' campaigns against the Turks around 1110.

There is no record of the dates of Tatikios' birth or death. Although the office of Grand Primicerius (megas primikerios) was usually held by a eunuch, some records suggest Tatikios had descendants who were members of a powerful noble family in the 12th century, including another general, prominent at the Battle of Sirmium, under Manuel I Komnenos. A possible descendant, Constantine Tatikios, was blinded following a failed plot against Isaac Angelos.
