= Tzykanisterion =

A tzykanisterion (Greek: τζυκανιστήριον) was a stadium for playing tzykanion (τζυκάνιον, the Greek name for chovgan, from Middle Persian čaukān, čōkān), a predecessor of polo adopted by the Byzantines from Sassanid Persia.

== History ==
According to John Kinnamos (263.17–264.11), the tzykanion was played by two teams on horseback, equipped with long sticks topped by nets, with which they tried to push an apple-sized leather ball into the opposite team's goal. The sport was very popular among the Byzantine nobility: Emperor Basil I (r. 867–886) excelled at it; his son, Emperor Alexander (r. 912–913), died from exhaustion while playing, Emperor Alexios I Komnenos (r. 1081–1118) was injured while playing with Tatikios, and John I of Trebizond (r. 1235–1238) died from an injury during a game.

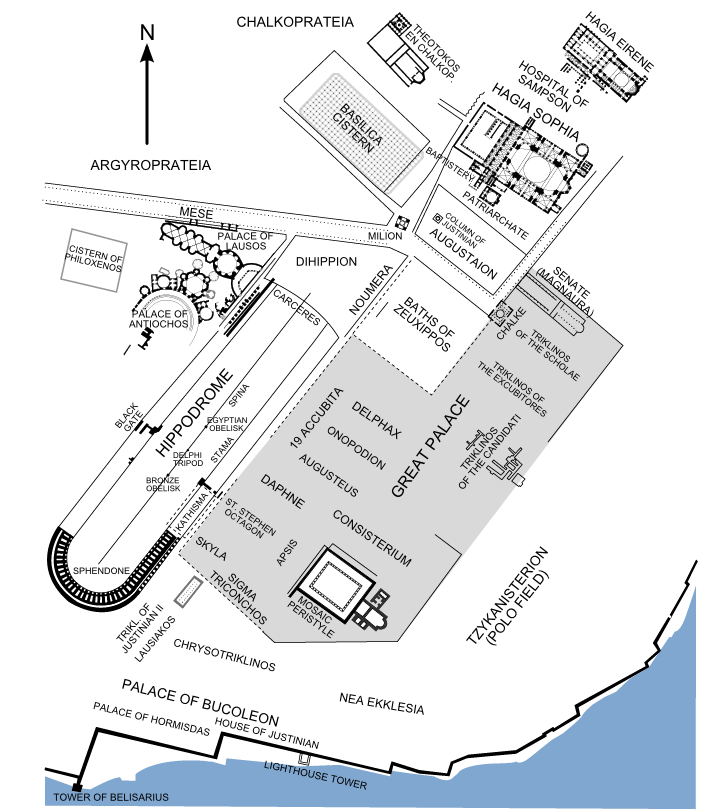
The tzykanisterion of the Great Palace of Constantinople

The Great Palace of Constantinople featured a tzykanisterion, first built by Emperor Theodosius II (r. 408–450) on the southeastern part of the palace precinct. It was demolished by Basil I in order to erect the Nea Ekklesia church in its place, and rebuilt in larger size further east, connected to the Nea with two galleries. Aside from Constantinople and Trebizond, other Byzantine cities also featured tzykanisteria, most notably Lacedaemonia, Ephesus, and Athens, something which modern scholars interpret as an indication of a thriving urban aristocracy.

These were also used as places of public tortures and executions, as it is historically recorded for the tzykanisteria of Constantinople and Ephesus.

== Sources ==
- Janin, Raymond (1964). Constantinople Byzantine. Développement Urbaine et Répertoire Topographique (in French). Paris, France: Institut Français d'Etudes Byzantines.
- Kazhdan, Alexander Petrovich, ed. (1991). The Oxford Dictionary of Byzantium. New York, New York and Oxford, United Kingdom: Oxford University Press. ISBN 978-0-19-504652-6.
- Laiou, Angeliki E., ed. (2002). The Economic History of Byzantium from the Seventh through the Fifteenth Century (PDF). Washington, District of Columbia: Dumbarton Oaks. ISBN 0-88402-288-9. Archived from the original (PDF) on 2012-02-18.
