= Buzkashi =

Afghanistan's national sport played on horseback

Buzkashi (Persian: بزکشی, romanized: buzkašī, lit. 'goat-pulling') is a traditional team sport in which horse-mounted players attempt to place a goat or calf carcass into a goal zone. The game is known as waz loba, kök-börü, ulak tartysh, kokpar, and kupkari, in Kyrgyzstan, Uzbekistan, Kazakhstan, and other countries of Central Asia., it is also played in parts of South Asia, mainly Afghanistan, and Pakistan.

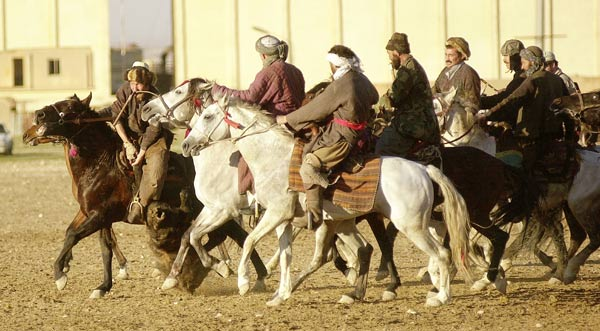
Game of buzkashi in Mazar-i-Sharif, Afghanistan

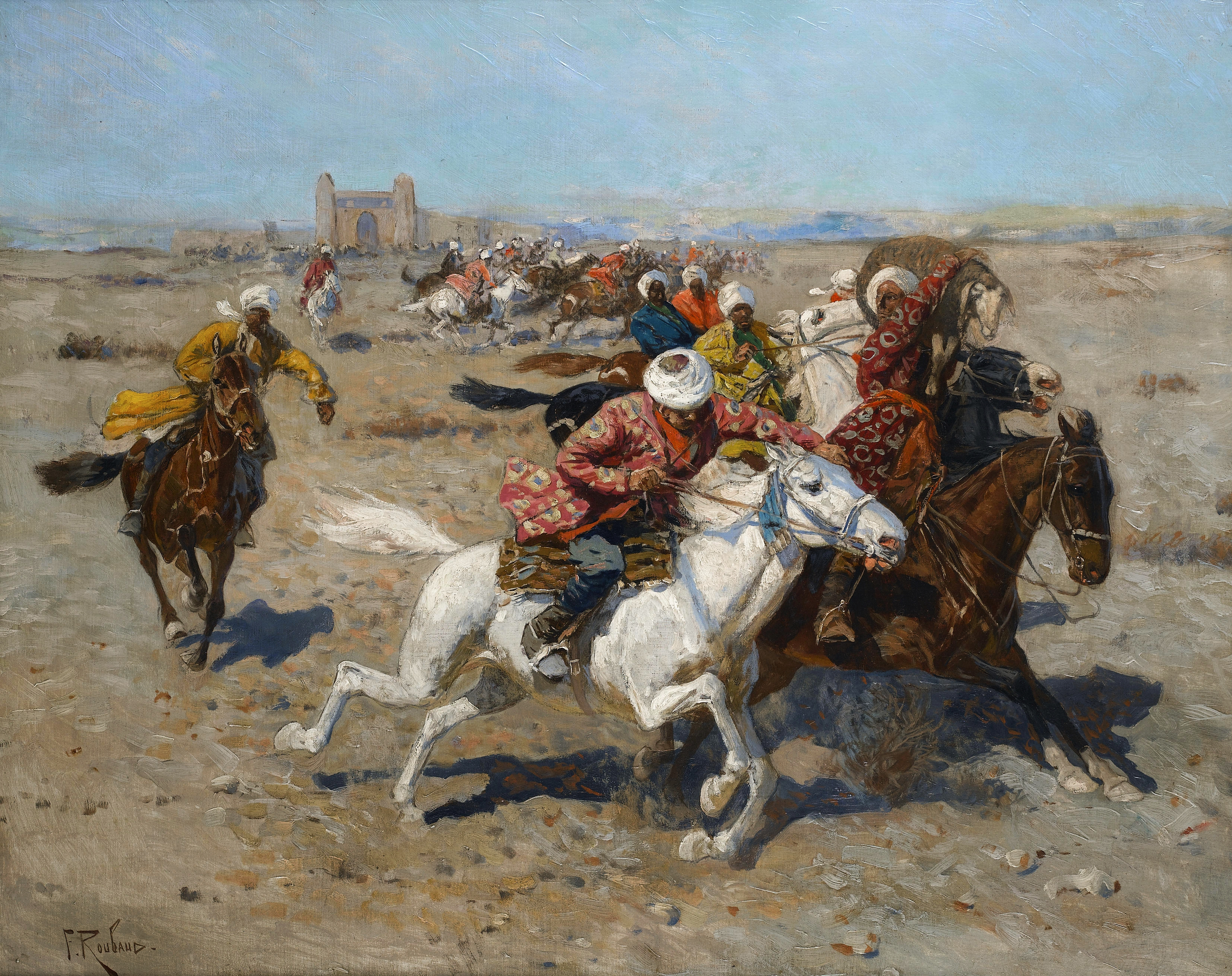
Playing Kokpar by Franz Roubaud

== History ==
Buzkashi began among the nomadic Turkic tribes of the Eurasian Steppe, spreading westward from China and Mongolia towards Afghanistan between the 10th and 15th centuries in a migration that ended in the first half of the twentieth century. From Scythian times until recent decades, buzkashi has remained a legacy of that bygone era.

== Events ==
- World Nomad Games
- 2013 - The first Asian championship in kokpar, or buzkashi.
- 2018 - The inaugural weeklong world championship ended in Astana.
- 2026 - After a nine year hiatus, the second world championship was played out in Turkistan.

== Distribution ==
Games similar to buzkashi are played today by several ethnic groups such as the Hazaras, Uzbeks, Kyrgyz, Turkmens, Kazakhs, Uyghurs, Tajiks, Wakhis and Pashtuns. In the West, the game is also played by Kyrgyz who migrated to Ulupamir village in the Van district of Turkey from the Pamir region. In western China, there is not only horse-back buzkashi, but also yak buzkashi among the Tajiks of Xinjiang.

=== Afghanistan ===
Buzkashi is the national sport of Afghanistan. It is often played on Fridays where matches tend to draw thousands of fans. Traditionally, games could last for several days, but in its more regulated tournament version, it has a limited match time.

During the first reign of the Taliban government in Afghanistan, buzkashi was banned as they considered the game immoral. After the Afghan Taliban was ousted in 2001, the sport resumed. When the Taliban regained power in 2021, they allowed the sport to continue.

=== Kazakhstan ===
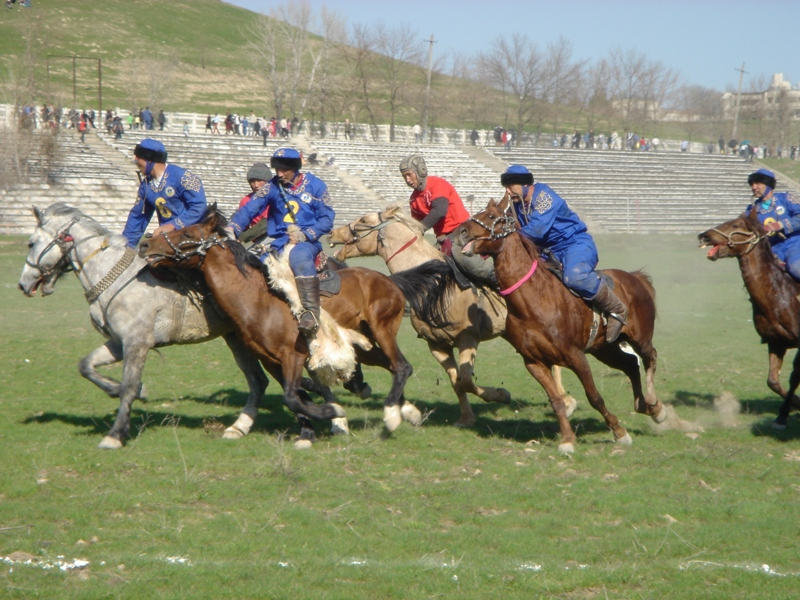
A game of kokpar, Kazakhstan

Kazakhstan's first National Kokpar Association was registered in 2000. The association has been holding annual kokpar championships among adults since 2001 and youth kokpar championships since 2005. All 14 regions of Kazakhstan have professional kokpar teams. The regions with the biggest number of professional kokpar teams are Southern Kazakhstan with 32 professional teams, Jambyl region with 27 teams and Akmola region with 18 teams. Kazakhstan's national kokpar team currently holds a title of Eurasian kokpar champions.

=== Kyrgyzstan ===
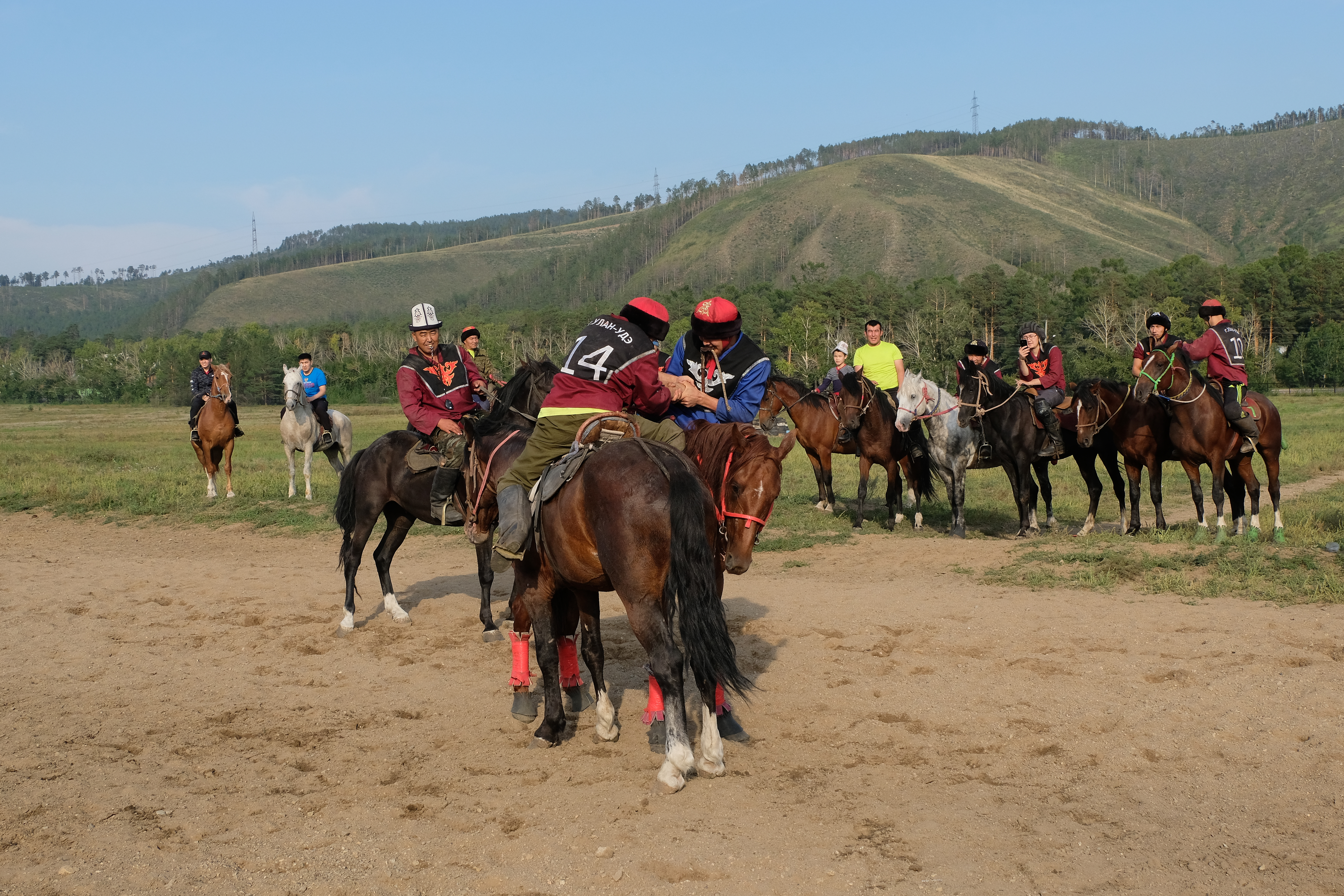
Kyrgyz kok-boru festival. Ulan-Ude, Buryatia

In Kyrgystan, the game is played as a team sport, with four players on each team. The word kok-boru means gray wolf in Kyrgyz, reflecting the fact that when the game was first played by shepherds, they used a wolf carcass, rather than a goat. While the sport is most often played by men, women can and do also sometimes participate. A photograph documents kokboru players in Kyrgyzstan around 1870; however, Kyrgyzstan's kokboru rules were first officially defined and regulated in 1949. Since 1958 kokboru has been held in stadiums. The size of a kok-boru field depends on the number of participants.

=== Tajikistan ===
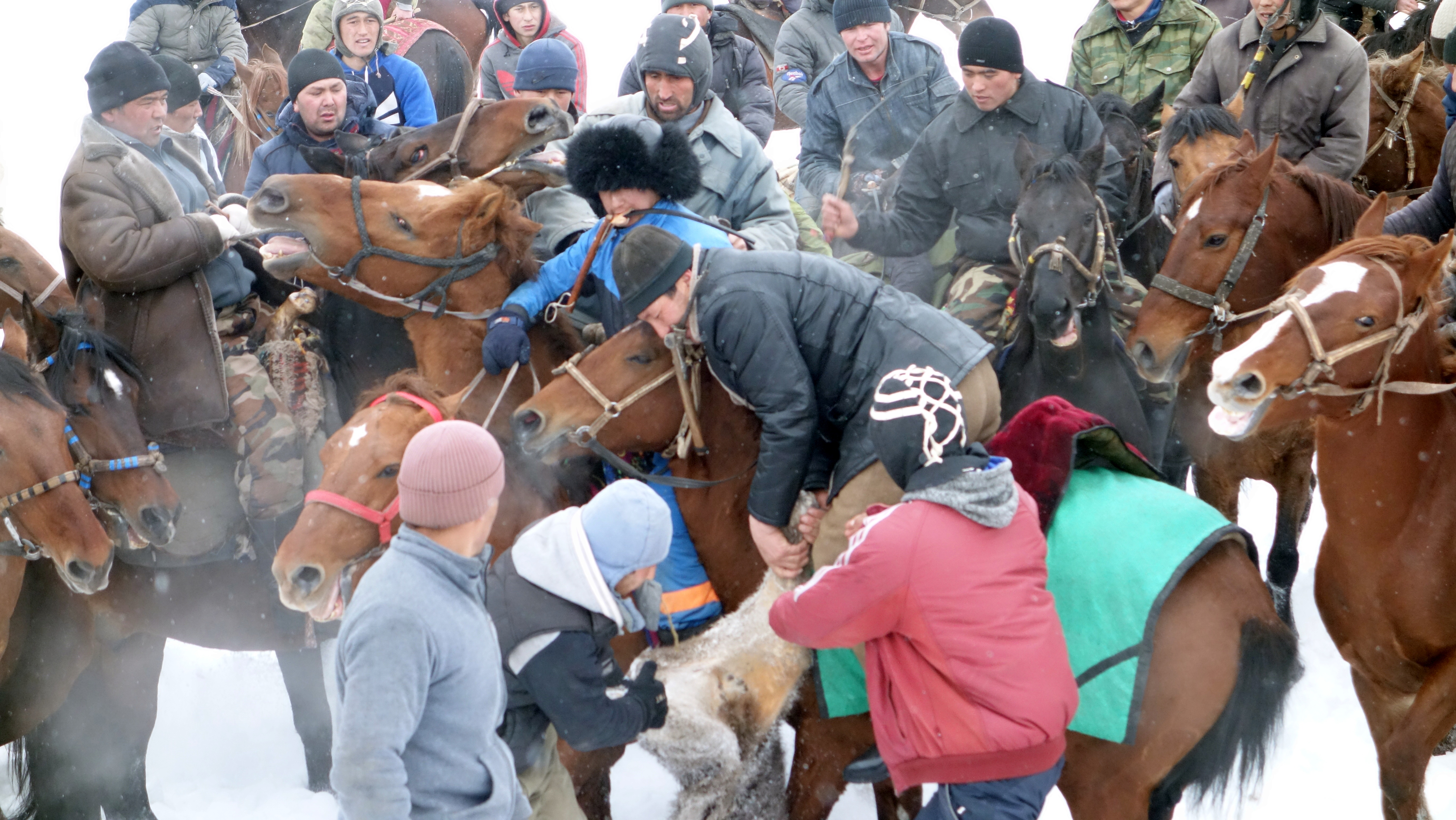
Buzkashi or Ulak tartysh players in Tajikistan, photo by Janyl Jusupjan

The buzkashi season in Tajikistan generally runs from November through April. High temperatures often prevent matches from taking place outside of this period, though isolated games might be found in some cooler mountain areas.

In Tajikistan and among the Tajik people of Tashkorgan in China's Xinjiang region, buzkashi games are particularly popular in relation to weddings as the games are sponsored by the father of the bride as part of the festivities.

=== Pakistan ===
In Pakistan, buzkashi has traditionally been very popular in certain places. it is still played by the Wakhi people of Hunza in Gilgit Baltistan and by the Pashtuns including Afghan refugees in parts of Balochistan.

=== United States ===
Buzkashi was brought to the U.S. by a descendant of the Afghan Royal Family, the family of King Amanullah and King Zahir Shah. A mounted version of the game has also been played in the United States in the 1940s. Young men in Cleveland, Ohio, played a game they called kav kaz. The men – five to a team – played on horseback with a sheepskin-covered ball. The Greater Cleveland area had six or seven teams. The game was divided into three "chukkers", somewhat like polo. The field was about the size of a football field and had goals at each end: large wooden frameworks standing on tripods, with holes about two feet square. The players carried the ball in their hands, holding it by the long-fleeced sheepskin. A team had to pass the ball three times before throwing it into the goal. If the ball fell to the ground, the player had to reach down from his horse to pick it up. One player recalls, "Others would try to unseat the rider as he leaned over. They would grab you by the shoulder to shove you off. There weren't many rules."

Mounted team-based potato races, a popular pastime in early 20th-century America, bore some resemblance to buzkashi, although on a much smaller and tamer scale.

== Rules and variations ==
Competition is typically fierce. Prior to the establishment of official rules by the Afghan Olympic Federation, the sport was mainly conducted based upon rules such as not whipping a fellow rider intentionally or deliberately knocking him off his horse. Riders usually wear heavy clothing and head protection to protect themselves against other players' whips and boots. For example, riders in the former Soviet Union often wear salvaged Soviet tank helmets for protection. The boots usually have high heels that lock into the saddle of the horse to help the rider lean on the side of the horse while trying to pick up the goat. Games can last for several days, and the winning team receives a prize, not necessarily money, as a reward for their win. Top players, such as Aziz Ahmad, are often sponsored by wealthy Afghans.

A buzkashi player is called a chapandaz (Pashto: چپنداز); it is mainly believed in Afghanistan that a skilful chapandaz is usually in his forties. People believe that a good player has undergone a long period of physical practice and observation. Similarly, horses used in buzkashi also undergo severe training and due attention. A player does not necessarily own the horse. Horses are usually owned by rich people, those wealthy enough to look after and provide training facilities for such horses. However, a master chapandaz can choose to select any horse and the owner of the horse usually wants his horse to be ridden by a master Chapandaz as a winning horse also brings pride to the owner.

The game consists of two main forms: Tudabarai (lit. 'emerging from a mass') and Qarajai (lit. 'black place'). Tudabarai is considered to be the simpler form of the game. In this version, the goal is simply to grab the carcass and move in any direction until clear of the other players. In Qarajai, players must carry the carcass around a flag or marker at one end of the field, then throw it into a scoring circle (the "Circle of Justice") at the other end. The riders will carry a whip to fend off opposing horses and riders. When the rider's hands are occupied, the whip is typically carried in the teeth. In summary, it is capture the flag with a goat corpse.

The calf in a buzkashi game is normally beheaded and disembowelled and has two limbs cut off. It is then soaked in cold water for 24 hours before play to toughen it. Occasionally sand is packed into the carcass to give it extra weight. Though a goat is used when no calf is available, a calf is less likely to disintegrate during the game. While players may not strap the calf to their bodies or saddles, it is acceptable—and common practice—to wedge the calf under one leg in order to free up the hands.

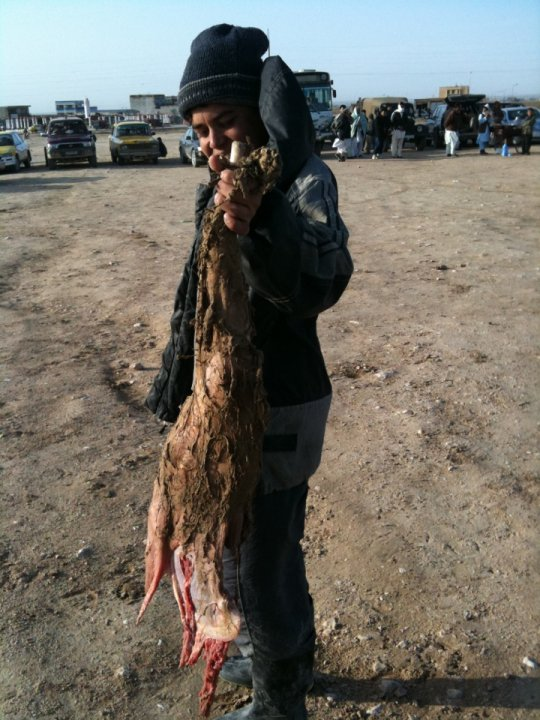
The headless carcass of a goat used in buzkashi

=== Afghanistan ===
These rules are for matches in Kabul, otherwise they are not strictly observed.

1. The field is a 400m by 400m square.
2. Each team consists of ten riders.
3. Only five riders from each team can play in a half.
4. There are two halves of 45 minutes, separated by a fifteen-minute break.
5. The game is supervised by a referee.

=== Kyrgyzstan ===
Kokboru field and two football (soccer) fields

Kazan

Rules of kokboru have undergone several changes throughout history. Modernized rules of kokboru are:

1. There are two teams with twelve participants each.
2. Only four players a team are allowed to play on the field at any given time.
3. Teams are allowed to substitute players or their horses.
4. The game is played on a field 200 meters long and 70 meters wide.
5. Two kazans – big goals with a 4.4 meters in diameter and 1.2 meters high are placed on opposite sides of a field.
6. The total duration of three periods is 60 minutes.
7. There is a 10-minute break between each period.
8. A goal is scored each time a ulak (goat carcass) is placed in an opponent's kazan.
9. A kokboru is brought to centre of the field after scoring a goal.

It is also prohibited to ride towards the spectators or receive spectators' assistance or to start a kokboru game without giving an oath to play justly.

=== Tajikistan ===
In Tajikistan, buzkashi is played in a variety of ways. The most common iteration is a free-form game, often played in a mountain valley or other natural arena, in which each player competes individually to seize the buz and carry it to a goal. Forming unofficial teams or alliances does occur, but is discouraged in favor of individual play. Often, dozens of riders will compete against one another simultaneously, making the scrum to retrieve a fallen buz a chaotic affair. Tajik buzkashi games typically consist of many short matches, with a prize being awarded to each player who successfully scores a point.

== In popular culture ==
=== In books and film adaptations ===
Buzkashi is portrayed in several books, both fiction and non-fiction. It is shown in Steve Berry's book The Venetian Betrayal. Buzkashi was the subject of a book called Horsemen of Afghanistan by French photojournalists Roland and Sabrina Michaud. Gino Strada wrote a book named after the sport (with the spelling Buskashì) in which he tells about his life as surgeon in Kabul in the days after the 9-11 strikes. P.J. O'Rourke also mentions the game in discussions about Afghanistan and Pakistan in the Foreign Policy section of Parliament of Whores, and Rory Stewart devotes a few sentences to it in The Places in Between.

Two books have been written about buzkashi which were later turned into films. The game is the subject of a novel by French novelist Joseph Kessel titled Les Cavaliers (aka Horsemen), which then became the basis of the film The Horsemen (1971). The film was directed by John Frankenheimer with Omar Sharif in the lead role, and U.S. actor and accomplished horseman Jack Palance as his father, a legendary retired chapandaz. This film shows Afghanistan and its people the way they were before the wars that wracked the country, particularly their love for the sport of buzkashi.

The game is also a key element in the book Caravans by James Michener and the film of the same name (1978) starring Anthony Quinn. A scene from the film featuring the king of Afghanistan watching a game included the real-life king at the time, Mohammed Zahir Shah. The whole sequence of the game being witnessed by the king was filmed on the Kabul Golf Course, where the national championships were played at the time the film was made.

In Ken Follett's book, Lie Down with Lions (1986), the game is mentioned being played, but instead of a goat, a live Russian soldier is used.

The game also appears in the 1988 book Rambo III by David Morrell and its film adaptation of the same year. Based on a screenplay by Sylvester Stallone and Sheldon Lettich, the story depicts a group of horsemen playing it and inviting the main character to join them.

In The Kite Runner (2003) by Khaled Hosseini, the protagonist, Amir returns to Afghanistan from the United States several years later, when the Taliban has taken over the government. He attends a game of Buzkashi, in which the audience was forced by the Taliban authorities circling the stadium to remain silent during the match. During the break, a Taliban leader, who is later revealed to be Amir's childhood enemy Assef, brings prisoners convicted of breaking the Sharia law in the stadium to be executed by stoning. The Taliban authorities, who were forcing the audience to be silent during the match, begin forcing everyone to cheer the stoning of the criminals.

The Bookseller of Kabul includes a scene in Mazar-i-Sharif celebrating the first Nowruz New Year's festival (March 2002) after the ousting of the Taliban. With some ten thousand pilgrims as spectators, two hundred riders take to the buzkashi field along with political leaders: tribal chief Hamid Karzai and warlord General Abdul Rashid Dostum. The latter, known for his brutality, easily takes the victory.

=== In film ===
A number of films also reference the game.

La Passe du Diable, a French 1956 film by Jacques Dupont and Pierre Schoendoerfer, concerns Buzkashi players. The Horsemen (1971) starring Jack Palance and Omar Sharif as father and son is centered on the game. Both La Passe du Diable and The Horseman are based on a novel by Joseph Kessel.

In Rambo III (1988), directed by Peter MacDonald, John Rambo (played by Sylvester Stallone) was shown in a sequence playing and scoring in a buzkashi with his mujahideen friends when suddenly they were attacked by Soviet forces. The Tom Selleck film High Road to China (1983) features a spirited game of buzkashi. Buzkashi is described at length in Episode 2, "The Harvest of the Seasons", of the documentary The Ascent of Man by Jacob Bronowski. It is put in the context of the domestication of the horse and the effect of nomadic warbands and raiders on agricultural settlements. The film includes several scenes from a game in Afghanistan. The opening scenes of the Indian film Khuda Gawah (1992), which was filmed in Afghanistan and India, show actors Amitabh Bachchan and Sridevi engaged in the game. The game also shown in other Indian films like Kabul Express (2006) and Sahasam (2013).

The 2012 joint international-Afghan short film Buzkashi Boys depicts a fictional story centered on the game, and has won awards at several international film festivals. On January 10, 2013, The Academy of Motion Picture Arts and Sciences nominated Buzkashi Boys for an Oscar in the category of Short Film (Live Action) for the 85th Academy Awards.

Venerated Buzkashi (ulak tartysh in Kyrgyz) player, 82 year old veteran school teacher Khamid Boronov stars in 2016 feature documentary film Letters from the Pamirs by Janyl Jusupjan. Famed Buzkashi players of Jaylgan village Shamsidin and Kazyke appear in a sequence to show the elements of Buzkashi to kids from a town. A spirited Buzkashi match is one of the last episodes of the film made in Jerge-Tal Kyrgyz region in Tajikistan's north.

An award-winning documentary about women playing kokpar in Kazakhstan, called Eva. Batyr Qyz (Eva. Hero Girl), was released in 2023. The film features Eva Zhigalina, who began playing the sport when she was fifteen years old.

== See also ==
- Chovgan
- Jereed
- Horseball, another game played on horseback
- Pato, a similar horseback Argentine sport
- Polo, a similar horseback game played with a ball
- Yak racing
- Archery
  - Bow and arrow
- List of extreme and adventure sports
- Sport of Kings
