= Potato race =

Racing event on foot or horseback

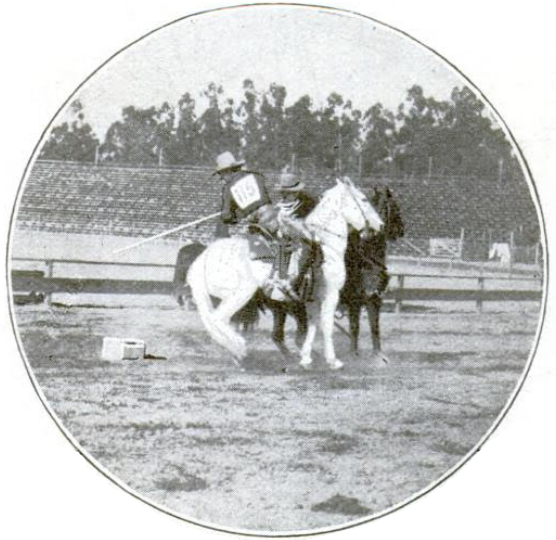
Riders in a mounted potato race. The rider on the white horse has just scored a point by placing a potato in his side's basket.

A potato race is one of several similar racing events where contestants compete to collect a number of potatoes as quickly as possible. Participants may run on foot or be mounted on horseback, depending on the style of race. It is not clear precisely when or where the potato race originated. Potato races of both types were most popular in Australia, England, Scotland, the United States of America and Wales. Potato races were commonly held at community events such as county fairs, rodeos, picnics, and track and field meets from at least the middle of the 19th century until approximately the 1930s.

Potato races run on foot were generally considered events for children, and were often held in schools as playground games or part of physical education, or at local events such as fairs.

Mounted events were particularly prevalent in the Southwestern United States. Individual mounted events usually consisted of individuals competing to be the fastest at collecting potatoes along a structured course. Team-based events had no defined course, and were notable for their violence. Players were permitted almost every possible tactic for interfering with the opposing team, including dragging other riders off their horses.

Potato races, both on-foot and mounted, are occasionally still held at local gatherings or riding competitions today, although the violent mounted version has died out.

== History ==
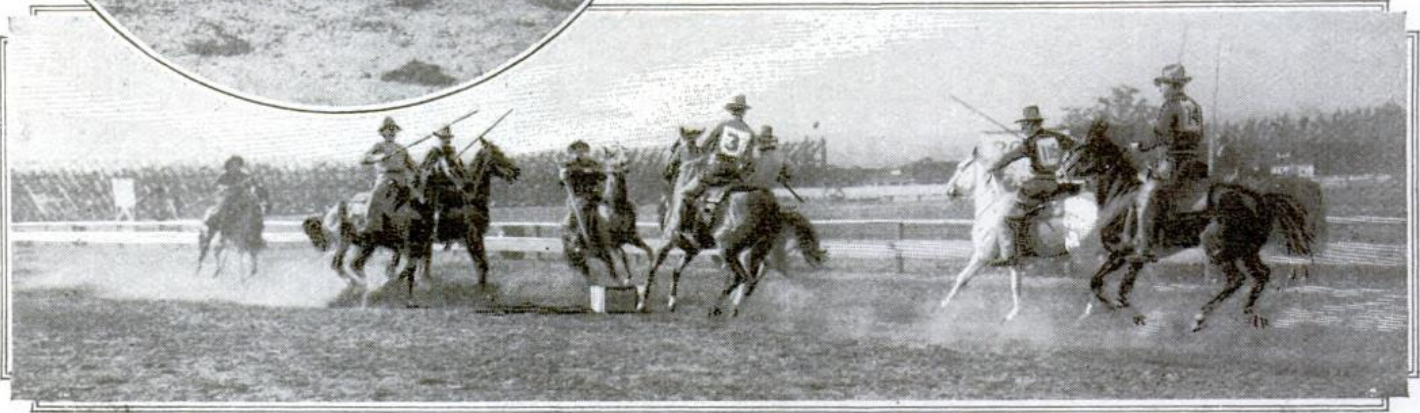
A mounted potato race in 1915

It is unclear precisely where and when the potato race was originally developed. It was mentioned by name without elaboration in newspaper reports of athletic events in Scotland, Australia, and Wales as early as the 1860s. The state fair of Wisconsin advertised a potato race "that beats Base Ball all hollow" in 1869, although again there was no description of the rules. In September 1871, newspapers in a number of US states reprinted a report from the Boston Advertiser which detailed an on-foot potato race that had taken place in East Wilton, New Hampshire, with many remarking that such events were becoming fashionable. The county fair of Lycoming County, Pennsylvania listed an on-foot potato race on its program in September 1871, directly referencing these reports. Official rules for potato racing were printed in the 1902 Official Handbook of the Amateur Athletic Union of the United States.

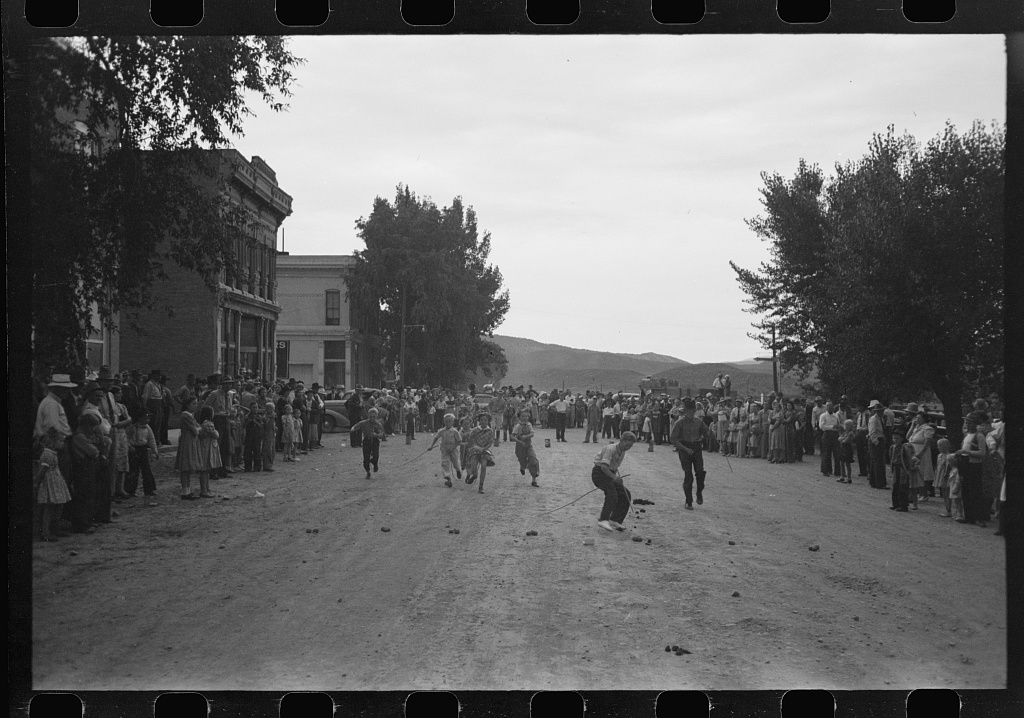
Boys running a potato race in Ridgway, Colorado during a Labour Day celebration in 1940.

In 1902, The Courier-Journal of Louisville, Kentucky described a mounted potato race that took place at the Louisville Horse Show, remarking on its violence and noting that it "made a big hit." It was not until 1912 that newspapers reported potato racing as a mounted rodeo event, with advertisements for one large Los Angeles rodeo listing the potato race by name, although without elaboration on the rules. A 1913 report in the San Francisco Chronicle clearly describes a team-based potato race taking place at a Mardi Gras celebration in Salinas, California, calling it a "new riding stunt".

By 1913, on-foot potato races were being referred to as old-fashioned. A 1917 article in Popular Mechanics magazine suggested racing to screw in a line of lightbulbs as a substitute for potato races. The popularity of mounted potato races as rodeo events died out by the 1930s.

Informal on-foot potato races for children are still featured as a means of entertainment at many local celebrations and events in the United States. Mounted potato races are still used as a part of equestrian gymkhana events for youth today, albeit in a more structured and form that lacks the violence of the team-based rodeo version.

== Foot races ==
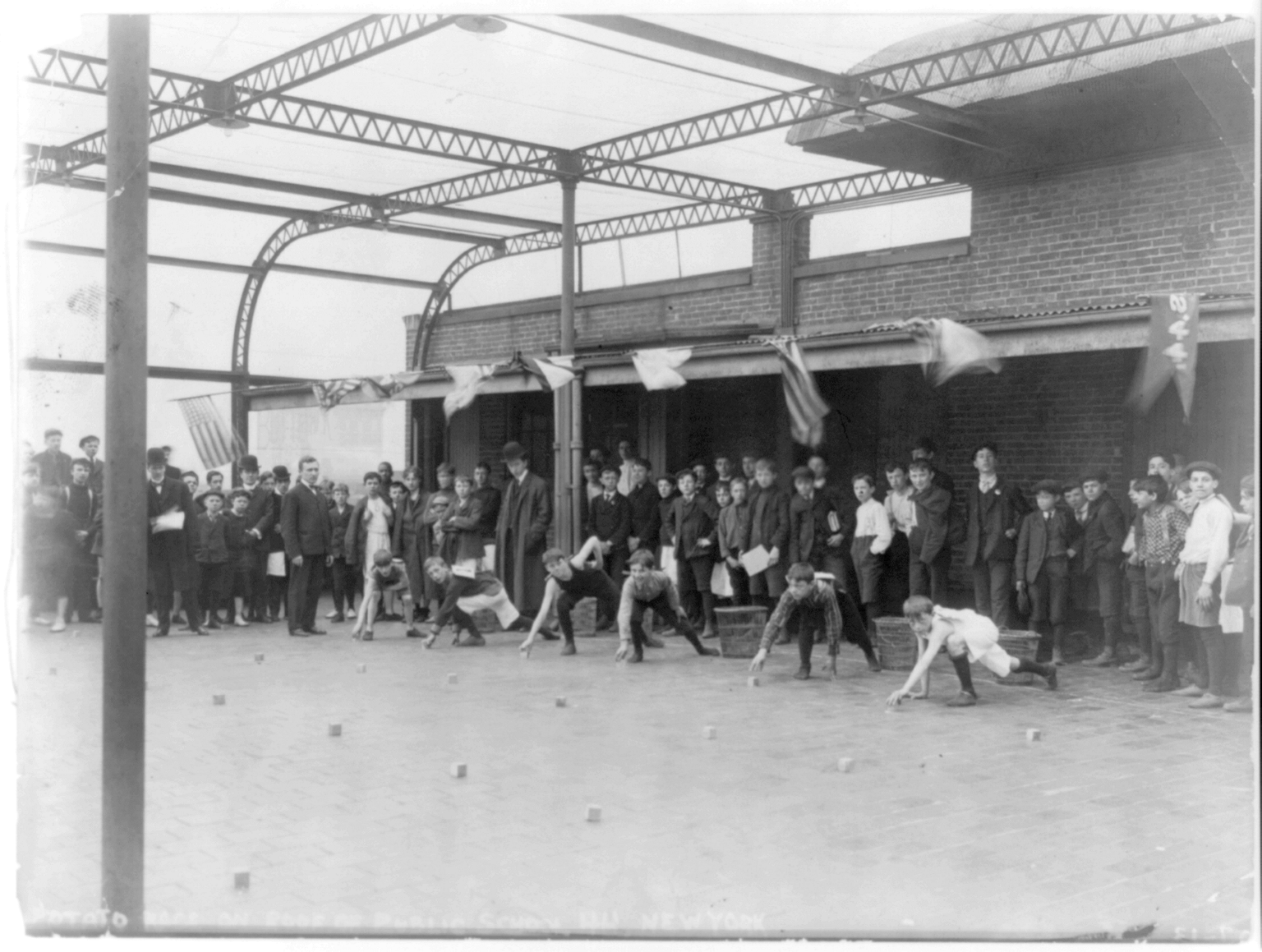
A potato race run on foot at a New York City school in 1919.

Potato races run on foot were commonly held for children as playground games and during physical education classes in schools. They were also featured at local events such as picnics or fairs, and still occasionally are today. Potato races have also been used by researchers to measure physical performance in children.

A number of lanes, one per runner, would be marked out. Potatoes would be placed at intervals along each lane, and a basket would be placed several feet behind the lane. Runners would race to retrieve potatoes one by one, returning each one to the basket before returning for the next. The winner was the first to collect all the potatoes in their lane. In one variation, two runners competed to be the first to return fifty potatoes to their own basket, racing simultaneously to take the closest potato from a single line of one hundred potatoes rather than separate lanes.

On-foot potato races have been likened to the Zuni game of A-we-wō-po-pa-ne, which involved collecting stones rather than potatoes.

Writing in 1915, feminist theorist Charlotte Perkins Gilman described seeing a moving picture of a potato race on ice, and remarked on the notable difference between the performance of men and women, which she attributed to the restrictive clothing worn by women at the time.

== Mounted ==
=== Individual competition ===
Potato races with mounted participants were historically geared toward adult participation. They were prominent in the Southwestern United States. In mounted races, competitors used sharpened stakes to spear potatoes and bring them from one end of a course to another. These races were timed, and the racer whose basket was heaviest at the end was the winner. One less common variation bore some similarities to the blood sport of rooster pulling, but used potatoes rather than partially buried roosters. A line of potatoes was spaced out along a course, and a rider would ride by at a loping pace, leaning down from their horse and snatching the potatoes from the ground. Riders who failed to maintain speed, or missed a potato, would be disqualified. The fastest remaining rider was the winner.

Mounted potato races have been staged with participants riding on vehicles rather than horses. The British Almanac of 1897 mentions a bicycle-mounted potato race in an article describing bicycle gymkhana. A large picnic in Radford, England, in 1908 featured a bicycle potato race whose riders were young women. It was described at the time as a "splendid exhibition". In 1910, 5,000 spectators at the Indianapolis Motor Speedway watched a sort of reverse potato race where passengers in cars tried to throw potatoes from the vehicle into baskets placed along a track. American Motorcyclist magazine reported that the First Annual Motorcycle Rodeo, held in 1970, featured a potato race with riders mounted on motorcycles.

=== Team-based tournament ===
Swinging their laths like swords and crashing into one another, potato racers at Cassoday left the hundred-yard course strewn with potatoes and an occasional horseman as spirits, and tempers, rose.

— Jim Hoy, Plains Folk: A Commonplace of the Great Plains, p. 126

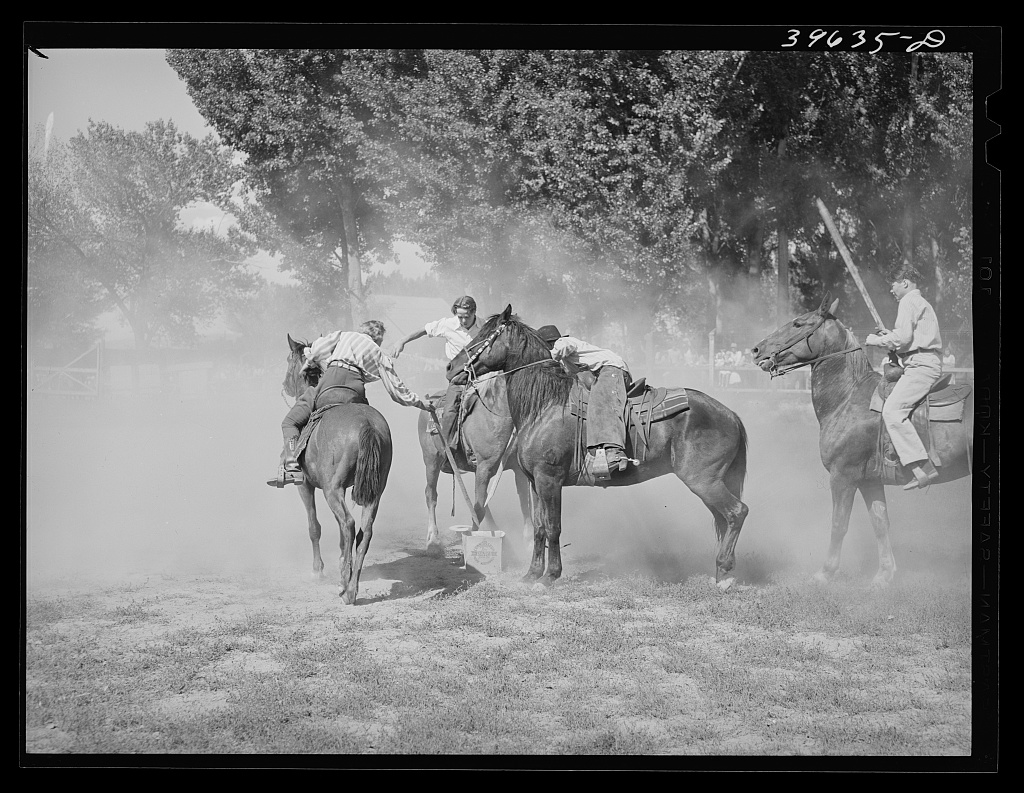
Mounted potato race during a Fourth of July celebration in Vale, Oregon.

Around the turn of the 20th century some mounted potato races were run as competitions between teams attempting to fill a basket with potatoes. These events were not so much ordered races as they were free-for-alls, which could last as long as ten minutes. They were notably chaotic, as riders were not confined to lanes, and the rules permitted competitors to use their stakes to knock potatoes off the stakes of the other teams. Physical violence often ensued; the autobiography of cowboy Harry Arthur Gant describes one team race at a Frontier Days event in 1909 that became so violent that the judges were forced to halt the competition in the middle. The Courier-Journal noted that violent tactics such as pulling riders off their horses were considered acceptable, and that "biting is about the only thing that is barred."

Writing in Plains Folk, James Hoy remarked upon the similarity of these races to the Central Asian sport of buzkashi, which also involves fiercely competitive riders attempting to bring items to a goal, albeit on a much larger scale than potato races.

== See also ==
- Corrida de sortija
- Cowboy polo
- Egg-and-spoon race
