= Ma'arrat Nu'man market bombing =

Airstrike by Russian forces

Maarrat al-Numan market bombing Maarrat al-Numan market massacre
- Part of Russian military intervention in the Syrian civil war
- Location of Maarrat al-Numan in Syria
- Location: 35°38′N 36°40′E; Maarrat al-Numan, Idlib Governorate, Syria
- Date: 22 July 2019; 7 years ago 8:00 to 8:30 a.m. (local time)
- Target: public market, houses
- Attack type: Airstrike
- Weapon: Aerial bombs
- Deaths: 43 civilians
- Injuries: 109
- Perpetrator: Russian Air Force
- Motive: unknown

The Maarrat al-Numan market bombing was the aerial bombardment of a marketplace and surrounding houses in the Syrian opposition-held town of Ma'arrat al-Numan in the Idlib Governorate of Syria. It was perpetrated on 22 July 2019, from 8:00 to 8:30 a.m. local time, during the Syrian Civil War. The bombing killed 43 civilians and injured another 109 people. At least two four-storey residential buildings and 25 shops were destroyed. A nearby school, located some 700 meters from the market, was damaged.

Later analysis confirmed that the bombing was perpetrated by a Russian Air Force fighter jet. The attack caused even more fatalities when a "double tap" strategy was used, in which a second wave of bombing hit the same target when rescue workers were on the site minutes later, killing them.

It was part of a wider Syrian military campaign against Idlib in 2019.

The United Nations Human Rights Council recorded the crime in its report published on 2 March 2020. It stated the following:

In parts of southern Idlib, including Ma'arrat al-Nu'man, pro-government forces persistently shelled civilian infrastructure in the de-escalation zone, leaving civilians with no choice but to flee. As such, there are reasonable grounds to believe that pro-government forces intended to terrorize civilians, in an effort to depopulate the zone and accelerate its capture.

— United Nations Human Rights Council

== See also ==
- Armanaz massacre
- Hass refugee camp bombing
- Atarib market massacre
- Kamuna refugee camp massacre

== Reports ==
- United Nations Human Rights Council (2 March 2020). "Report of the Independent International Commission of Inquiry on the Syrian Arab Republic — Forty-third session".
