= Hass refugee camp bombing =

2019 aerial bombardment of a Syrian camp

Hass refugee camp bombing Hass compound airstrike
- Part of Russian intervention in the Syrian civil war
- Location of Hass in Syria
- Location: 35°37′N 36°35′E; Hass, Idlib Governorate, Syria
- Date: 16 August 2019; 7 years ago 7:25 p.m. (local time)
- Target: Refugee camp
- Attack type: Airstrike
- Weapon: Aerial bombs
- Deaths: 20 civilians
- Injuries: 52
- Perpetrator: Russian Air Force
- Motive: unknown

The Hass refugee camp bombing was an aerial bombardment of a refugee camp in the Syrian opposition-held town of Hass in the Idlib Governorate of Syria, which has been deemed a war crime by Human Rights Watch. It was perpetrated on 16 August 2019, at 7:25 p.m. local time, during the Syrian civil war. The bombing killed 20 civilians, including a pregnant woman, and injured another 52 people.

== Airstrike ==
The refugee camp was located outside the town, eight miles from the nearest front line, and there were no military targets nearby. Later analysis confirmed that the bombing was perpetrated by a bomber jet of the Russian Federation. Two Russian Sukhoi Su-24 war planes departed the Khmeimim Air Base on that day, at 7:02 p.m., and were then circling the area. No Syrian war planes were recorded over the area at the time of the bombardment. The two bombs dropped on the refugee camp were identified as OFAB-100-120 and KAB-500. The blast collapsed a row of buildings around the courtyard of the camp.

It was part of a wider Syrian military campaign against Idlib in 2019. Human Rights Watch released a statement saying that "under international law, deliberate or reckless attacks against civilians and civilian objects committed with criminal intent are war crimes".

== International responses ==
France condemned the airstrike on the refugee camp and called for the cessation of hostilities.

The United Nations Human Rights Council recorded the crime in its report published on 2 March 2020. It stated the following:

...the Commission concluded that a Russian aircraft participated in each incident as described above, and that each of the incidents the Russian Air Force did not direct the attacks at a specific military objective, amounting to the war crime of launching indiscriminate attacks in civilian areas.

== See also ==
- Armanaz massacre
- April 2016 Idlib bombings
- Atarib market massacre
- Kamuna refugee camp massacre

Similar international events:

- 2022 Dedebit Elementary School airstrike in Tigray, Ethiopia
- 2023 Jabalia refugee camp airstrikes
  - 31 October 2023 Jabalia refugee camp airstrike
- 2023 Laiza massacre in Myanmar

== Reports ==
- United Nations Human Rights Council (2 March 2020). "Report of the Independent International Commission of Inquiry on the Syrian Arab Republic — Forty-third session".
