= Syrian genocide =

Syrian genocide may refer to:

- Sayfo
- Syrian civil war
  - List of massacres during the Syrian civil war
  - Sednaya Prison
- Persecution of Christians by the Islamic State
