= 2017 Mosul airstrike =

American bombing in Iraq

- Part of the Battle of Mosul (2016–2017)
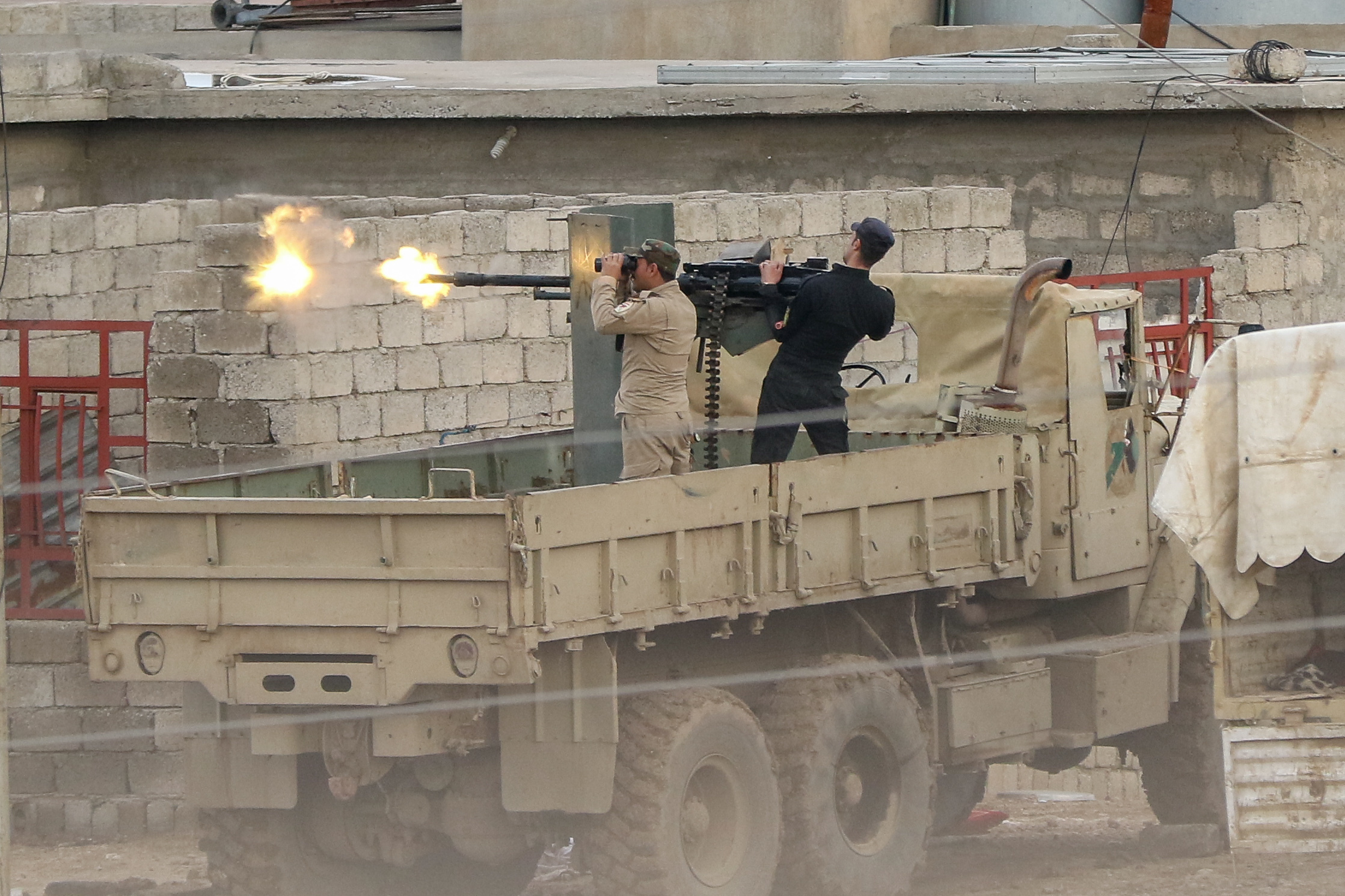
- Iraqi Army firing at ISIS positions in western Mosul, 17 March 2017

- 2017 Mosul airstrike (Iraq)
- Location: 36.34°N 43.13°E; Mosul, Iraq
- Date: 17 March 2017
- Attack type: Airstrike
- Deaths: 105–278
- Injuries: Unknown
- Perpetrator: United States

The 2017 Mosul airstrike, was an American bombing in the al-Aghawat al-Jadidah neighborhood in western Mosul on 17 March 2017 that killed between 105 and 278 civilians. The incident was the largest single death toll inflicted by a coalition air strike since the 2003 invasion of Iraq by U.S. forces.

Some residents of the al-Jadida neighborhood say the airstrike hit an explosive-filled truck, detonating a blast that collapsed buildings packed with families. A Pentagon investigation concluded that a US aircraft delivered a single precision-guided bomb (GBU-38 JDAM) with the intention of targeting two ISIL snipers on the second storey of a structure in al-Jadida neighborhood. But the bomb also caused a large cache of ISIL explosives to detonate, leading to the catastrophic collapse of the building that had civilians sheltering downstairs, officials said.

== Background ==
Beginning on 16 October 2016, American-led forces began taking back control of the city of Mosul after it fell under occupation of the Islamic State of Iraq and the Levant (ISIL) in 2014. On 24 January 2017, the Eastern half of the city had been liberated from ISIL control, and the coalition forces began advancing into western Mosul soon after.

In February, the Trump administration stated that the U.S. would sharply escalate its support for the offensive in Mosul. The Pentagon reported that around 1,400 separate munitions were unleashed over the last two weeks of March. The Iraqi Observatory for Human Rights corroborated an increase in the rate of drone strikes and reported 3,846 civilian deaths and the destruction of 10,000 homes since the offensive into western Mosul began. Bassma Bassim, the head of the Mosul District Council, stated that air raids from 10 March to 17 March alone had killed "more than 500" civilians.

== Attack ==
On 18 March, the U.S. Department of Defense stated that the American-led coalition had conducted "eight strikes consisting of 73 engagements in Iraq, coordinated with and in support of Iraq’s government" and four of these strikes targeted ISIL in Mosul. They noted the strikes "engaged three ISIS tactical units; destroyed 56 ISIS vehicles, 25 fighting positions, five rocket-propelled grenade systems, two medium machine guns, two mortar systems, and an ISIS car bomb; and suppressed 20 ISIS mortar teams and four ISIS tactical units." The following day, they noted five more strikes in Mosul which "engaged four ISIS tactical units; destroyed 14 fighting positions, four vehicles, two rocket-propelled grenade systems, a medium machine gun, and an artillery system; damaged 14 supply routes; and suppressed five mortar teams and three ISIS tactical units." Some residents of the al-Jadida neighborhood say the airstrike hit an explosive-filled truck, detonating a blast that collapsed buildings packed with families.

== Investigation ==
The United States Central Command confirmed that the American-led coalition conducted an airstrike targeting ISIL fighters and equipment on 17 March in the al-Jadidah neighborhood, where the civilian casualties were reported; however, they could not confirm which member of the coalition conducted the airstrike. Initial media reports placed the number of dead as high as 200.

The Iraqi military initially blamed ISIL for the deaths, saying that 61 bodies had been recovered at the site of a destroyed booby-trapped house. They said that there was no indication of an air strike. This was contradicted by on the ground reports and accounts from other officials. A provincial health official told Reuters that large parts of the neighborhood had been destroyed in during the battle and that 160 bodies had the recovered from the Al–Jadida neighborhood and buried. On March 27, the Iraqi Civil Defense Department cited a figure of 531 bodies recovered from the Al–Jadida neighborhood. On March 28, Airwars reported that at least 101 civilians were killed in the airstrike. They also noted reports that Iraqi artillery had also hit the street, and that ISIL may have been involved. Locals also reported that airstrikes set off secondary explosions, causing numerous buildings to collapse.

On March 24, the Los Angeles Times reported that local civil defense officials had estimated that at least 200 people were killed in the airstrike. On April 5, they reported that Iraqi officials had stated that 278 bodies, many of them children, had been removed from the area of the airstrike.

On 25 May 2017, the Pentagon concluded that at least 105 civilians died in the airstrike when a US aircraft delivered a single precision-guided bomb (GBU-38 JDAM) with the intention of targeting two ISIL snipers on the second storey of a structure in al-Jadida neighborhood. But the bomb also caused a large cache of ISIL explosives to detonate, leading to the catastrophic collapse of the building that had civilians sheltering downstairs, officials said. They also reported that eyewitnesses said that another 36 civilians were in the building, but that they had "insufficient evidence to determine their status".

== Aftermath ==
The Iraqi Army temporarily stopped its advance into western Mosul following the airstrike.

== Reactions ==
=== Supranational and non-governmental organizations ===
- Amnesty International – Amnesty International stated that recent increase in civilian casualties from U.S.-led coalition airstrikes "raised serious questions about the lawfulness of these attacks."
- United Nations – The UN expressed profound concern over the escalating civilian death toll in the battle to retake Mosul.
- Human Rights Watch – Human Rights Watch stated that "The high number of civilian deaths in recent fighting, as well as recent announcements about changed procedures for vetting airstrikes, raise concerns about the way the battle for west Mosul is being fought."

=== Countries ===
- Iraq – Speaker of the Iraqi parliament Salim al-Jabouri, said in a statement, "What's happening in the west part of Mosul is extremely serious and could not be tolerated under any circumstances."
- Iran – Ali Shamkhani, the Secretary of Iran's Supreme National Security Council, has accused the United States of committing war crimes, saying: "This war crime is similar to the behavior of Daesh [Islamic State] and other Takfiri groups in targeting civilians and innocent people and should be urgently addressed in courts of justice [in Hague]."
- Russia – According to Russia's Ministry of Defense, "Absurd statements of the Pentagon representatives [that "ISIS is smuggling civilians into buildings"] justifying civil casualties caused by American bombing in Iraq give more information on the operation planning level and the alleged supremacy of the American "smart" bombs."
- Vatican City – Pope Francis stated that forces involved in the battle for Mosul have an obligation to protect non-combatants, "In expressing profound sadness for the victims of the bloody conflict, I renew my appeal that everyone commit themselves to using all efforts to protect civilians, an imperative and urgent obligation"
- Belgium – Belgium has opened an investigation into the Mosul airstrikes to determine if its warplanes were responsible for civilian casualties.
- Australia – Defence Minister Marise Payne stated that, after an investigation, it was found that Australian combat aircraft were not involved in the airstrike.

== See also ==
- Civilian casualties from U.S. drone strikes
- 2017 al-Jinah airstrike
- 2019 U.S. airstrike in Baghuz
- List of massacres in Iraq
- United States war crimes
