= 2017 al-Jinah airstrike =

Airstrike by the United States Armed Forces

- Part of the Syrian Civil War and the American-led intervention in Syria
- Location: 36.1079°N 36.7870°E
- Date: 16 March 2017
- Executed by: United States
- Casualties: 38–49 killed 26–100+ injured
- Location within Syria

On 16 March 2017, an airstrike by the United States Armed Forces killed up to 49 people in the rebel-held village of al-Jinah near Aleppo, Syria. The Syrian Observatory for Human Rights (SOHR) and local officials reported that the building struck was a mosque filled with worshipers. Rami Abdel Rahman, head of SOHR, said the structure was a mosque which held over 300 people at the time of the strike. In May 2017, a US Central Command investigation determined that the building was indeed part of a mosque-complex. The US military had originally said the structure bombed was an al-Qaeda meeting place that was not a mosque itself but was next to a mosque, which was undamaged. In September 2017, the United Nations Commission of Inquiry on Syria concluded that "United States forces failed to take all feasible precautions to avoid or minimize incidental loss of civilian life, injury to civilians and damage to civilian objects, in violation of international humanitarian law." The UN commission's findings did not support the U.S. claim that an al-Qaeda meeting was taking place. Investigations by Human Rights Watch and Forensic Architecture also did not find any evidence of an al-Qaeda meeting.

== Casualties ==
Forty-two people were initially reported by the SOHR to have been killed, though the group said that by March 17 the death toll had increased to 49, while The Guardian reported that 46 people had died. The SOHR said that most of the casualties were civilians, and more than 100 people were injured. The Syrian Civil Defence said that "dozens" of people had been buried in rubble following the strike. According to a September 2017 report from the UN Commission of Inquiry on Syria, 38 people were killed, including five children, and 26 people were wounded.

According to a spokesman for the Pentagon, "dozens" of al-Qaeda fighters, including "senior al Qaeda terrorists, some of these were likely high value individuals", were among those killed. Another spokesman stated that initial assessments indicated no civilian casualties.

== U.S. involvement ==
A missile fragment was reportedly found at the attack scene which had Latin alphabet letters corresponding with script found on missiles used by US forces, according to British investigative group Bellingcat. The Syrian Institute for Justice released photographs showing fragments of American weapons at the site of the bombing, which British newspaper The Telegraph cited as evidence that the US was responsible for civilian casualties.

A United States Central Command spokesman, Josh Jacques, confirmed that the United States had carried out an airstrike, but said that the area was "assessed to be a meeting place for al-Qaeda" and denied both that the mosque had been the target and that it had been the building that was destroyed. "We did not target a mosque, but the building that we did target – which was where the meeting [of militants] took place – is about 50 feet [15 m] from a mosque that is still standing," spokesperson Colonel John Thomas said. Pentagon spokesman Jeff Davis later clarified that the target had been identified as a "partially constructed community center." The photo released by the Pentagon showed the mosque was "relatively unscathed," Davis added.

The Washington Post reported that two Reaper drones fired at least four Hellfire missiles and dropped a 500-pound (230 kg) bomb in the attack. Within a week of the attack, US Central Command began two internal investigations, one into whether civilians had been killed and another to find additional information about the type of building hit and its occupants. On May 5, 2017, the investigation determined that the building was indeed part of a mosque-complex.

According to Forensic Architecture, witness testimonies and photographs of the building taken before the strike suggested few of the rooms had doors separating them from one another. A large number of local residents visited regularly and the building was open to the public. Forensic Architecture concluded that "[a]ll of this makes it unlikely that a meeting of senior al-Qaeda operatives would have been taking place at the time of the strike."

In a report released 18 April 2017, Human Rights Watch stated that they had "not found evidence to support the allegation that members of al-Qaeda or any other armed group were meeting in the mosque." Local residents in the area reported that there were no members of armed groups at the mosque or in the area at the time of the attack and that the victims were all civilians and local residents. First responders to the initial strike said the dead and injured wore civilian clothes and that they saw no weapons at the site. Human Rights Watch also noted that "U.S. authorities have so far released no information to support their claims."

In June 2017, a United States military investigation found the airstrike was legal and caused one civilian casualty. U.S. Army Brig. Gen. Paul Bontrager said the investigation into the attack did not involve any interviews with people on the ground and no U.S. personnel visited the site.

In September 2017, a report from the UN Commission of Inquiry on Syria said that three days before striking the mosque compound, the U.S. team knew about the target but did not do enough to verify it. The Commission therefore concluded that "United States forces failed to take all feasible precautions to avoid or minimize incidental loss of civilian life, injury to civilians and damage to civilian objects, in violation of international humanitarian law." The UN commission said its findings did not support the U.S. claim that an al-Qaeda meeting was taking place there and the U.S. had not released evidence that such a meeting took place. The report noted that the United States Central Command investigation included interviews with dozens of people, none of whom were in al-Jinah at the time of the attack. The investigators said the U.S. had sought to limit collateral damage using ten bombs that produced minimal blast and fragmentation to hit the building, before following up with two missiles fired by a drone at people fleeing.

== Reactions ==
- Human Rights Watch considered the attack as unlawful and condemned the US for failing to take necessary precautions to avoid civilian casualties in the strike.
- Russia – Defense Minister Sergey Shoygu urged a comment from the United States after photos of a reported US missile fragment found at the site of the bombed Syrian mosque appeared on the Internet.

== See also ==
- Civilian casualties from U.S. drone strikes
- 2019 U.S. airstrike in Baghuz
- 2017 Mosul airstrike
- Kunduz hospital airstrike
- List of massacres in Syria
- List of massacres during the Syrian civil war
- United States war crimes
