= Tafurs =

Group of participants of the First Crusade

The Tafurs were a group of Christian participants of the First Crusade. Zealots following strict oaths of poverty, they are said to have committed acts of cannibalism during the siege of Antioch or the siege of Ma'arra.

== Background ==
The Tafurs took their name from a horseless Norman knight, who assumed the organization and armed leadership of peasants gathered by the preaching and spiritual leadership of Peter the Hermit, and so became known as "King Tafur". "Tafur" appears to mean just "beggar" or "vagrant". "King Tafur" took harsh vows of poverty, relinquished his weapons and armour and donned a sack-cloth and a scythe, urging his followers to do the same.

The Tafurs typically wore no shoes and little clothing. They barely lived off roots or herbs, frequently exhibited sores and bruises throughout their bodies, and were kept separated from the rest of the Crusaders. They wielded clubs, knives, hatchets, etc., but were not allowed to have money or sophisticated weapons, in contrast to the other Christian fighters. But according to their rules, they could keep anything gained through plunder. Indeed, they regarded such spoils as validation of God's favour for their poverty. Hence, their search for spoils was described as rapacious and ruthless.

== Alleged cannibalism ==
After the Crusade, the Tafurs became infamous for their disregard for danger and their reported acts of cannibalism: some sources say that they showed little hesitation in consuming the bodies of fallen enemies, as starvation befell the crusader army in Antioch. In result, the Muslims are said to have significantly dreaded them, much more so than the rest of the crusaders. When the governor of Antioch appealed to the Crusaders' princes to restrain the Tafurs, the princes had to admit to having little sway over them. Most of the barons (with the notable exception of Bohemond of Taranto) seem to have held the Tafurs in contempt and never mention them in "official" accounts sent back to Europe. They are, however, featured in chronicles written from a lower social standpoint, such as Dei gesta per Francos, and in popular epics such as the Chanson d'Antioche.

However, while the cannibalism at the siege of Ma'arra is well-documented, the evidence for Antioch is less clear, and none of the earliest chronicles written about the Crusade hold the Tafurs responsible. They are first identified as possible culprits in the Dei gesta per Francos, a rewrite of the earlier chronicle Gesta Francorum, which did not mention them in this context. As the ardent fanatics later widely described, they appeared for the first time in the Chanson d'Antioche, composed about 80 years after the events.

After analyzing the many available sources, historian Jay Rubenstein concluded that the idea that the Tafurs (who were actually unarmed helpers and hardly particularly fearsome) were specifically responsible for the cannibal acts is nothing but a myth, spread by some later chroniclers and authors out of a desire "to blame the poor for the cannibalism", thus deflecting the responsibility from the rest of the crusaders. He called it "indeed remarkable that historians have continued to embrace his rather cynical solution", adding that "the Tafurs survived in the historical imagination only because they made such convenient scapegoats".

The Tafurs accompanied the other crusaders to Jerusalem and participated in the siege of the city in 1099.
