= 2019 U.S. airstrike in Baghuz =

Incident concealed by the U.S. military

- Part of the American-led intervention in the Syrian civil war
- Baghuz (Syria)
- Location: Al-Baghuz Fawqani, Deir ez-Zor Governorate, Syria
- Date: 18 March 2019
- Target: Islamic State
- Attack type: Airstrike
- Weapon: F-15E fighter jet
- Deaths: Up to 80 (64 civilians and 16 ISIL fighters) (Per The New York Times); 56 (52 IS fighters and 4 civilians) (Per U.S.)
- Injuries: 15 civilians (per U.S.)
- Perpetrator: United States Air Force

On 18 March 2019, during the Battle of Baghuz Fawqani, the Talon Anvil special operations group, a Delta Force unit within the larger Task Force 9 of the United States Armed Forces, carried out an airstrike using an F-15E fighter-attack aircraft in Al-Baghuz Fawqani, Syria. The incident was concealed by the U.S. military, and was first reported on 14 November 2021 by The New York Times, who reported that the incident led to the deaths of 80 people, 64 of whom were civilians, which would make it one of the largest civilian casualty incidents of the war against the Islamic State. A US military investigation in May 2022 concluded that the airstrike killed 52 IS fighters and 4 civilians and did not violate the laws of war.

== The strike ==
On the morning of 18 March 2019, during the Battle of Baghuz Fawqani, the Syrian Democratic Forces had repelled an hours-long Islamic State counterattack that nearly overran a position. According to U.S. Central Command spokesman Captain William (Bill) Urban, an Air Force special operations unit named Talon Anvil, part of the larger Task Force 9, called in an airstrike on a crowd of people in the area.

The U.S. aircraft dropped two bombs on a crowd of people, which were, according to The New York Times, mostly women and children who were trying to escape the fighting on the banks of the Euphrates, near the Syria-Iraq border. According to the report by The New York Times, the crowd had been identified as civilians by U.S. drone operators based in Al-Udeid airbase in Qatar. The drone operators were reportedly stunned seeing the first 500 lb bomb dropped, followed by a second 2,000 lb bomb on the survivors; 80 people were killed including Islamic State fighters according to The New York Times report.

== Aftermath ==
Civilian observers coming to the strike area the next day witnessed piles of dead women and children. The human rights organization Raqqa Is Being Slaughtered Silently called the incident a "terrible massacre" and posted photos of the bodies. The strike area was bulldozed shortly afterwards.

=== Coverup by the military ===
The 2019 incident was concealed by the U.S. military until it was reported in 2021 by the New York Times. The official military tally of civilian dead for the year 2019 is only 22, and does not include the toll from the 2019 Baghuz attack. Investigation of the case was blocked by the independent inspector general and the Air Force Office of Special Investigations. According to the New York Times investigation, senior military officials in Iraq and Florida never reviewed the airstrike, and the investigation technically remained open until the issue was reported by the Times. Representative Adam Smith, Democrat of Washington and the chairman of the panel, said in an email to The New York Times that "Both the incident and the efforts to cover it up are deeply disturbing."

=== Post-New York Times report developments ===
A U.S. Air Force legal officer, Lt Col Dean Korsak, said the incident could be a "possible war crime". On 15 November 2021, Secretary of Defense Lloyd Austin ordered a briefing on the strike and its handling. Lloyd Austin promised to "revamp" military procedures and hold top officers responsible for civilian damage, but did not discuss any systemic problems leading to the persisting civilian casualties in Syria and Afghanistan battlefields. Pentagon spokesperson John Kirby said that "No military in the world works as hard as we do to avoid civilian casualties". Also, he did not say if "senior officers would be held accountable". The US Central Command said that the attack was justified because it killed Islamic State fighters.

Human rights groups have called for an independent investigation into the bombing by the United States Congress.

== See also ==
- 2017 al-Jinah airstrike
- 2017 Mosul airstrike
- List of massacres in Syria
- List of massacres during the Syrian civil war
- United States war crimes
