= April 2016 Idlib bombings =

Syrian bomb attack

- Location of Maarrat al-Nu'man and Kafr Nabl in Syria
- Location: 35°38′N 36°40′E; Maarrat al-Nu'man and Kafr Nabl, Idlib Governorate, Syria
- Date: April 19, 2016; 10 years ago ~12:00 PM (Eastern European Time)
- Target: Civilians
- Attack type: Airstrike
- Weapon: Aerial bombs
- Deaths: 41-48+
- Perpetrator: Syrian Arab Air Force (unclear) Russian Air Force (unclear)

The April 2016 Idlib bombings are two separate aerial bombardments on marketplaces in the rebel-held towns of Maarrat al-Nu'man and Kafr Nabl in the Idlib Governorate of Syria. The bombings killed more than 40 civilians and was described as a massacre by the Syrian Observatory for Human Rights.

== The bombings ==
Around noon on 19 April 2016, the marketplace near the center of Maarrat al-Nu'man was hit by an airstrike, killing more than 38 civilians and wounding others. Simultaneously, the market in the town of Kafr Nabl was bombed, killed at least 9 people.
