= Atarib market massacre =

Airstrikes in Syria on 13 November 2017

Atarib market bombing Atarib market massacre
- Part of Russian intervention in Syria
- Location of Atarib in Syria
- Location: 36°08′N 36°49′E; Atarib, Aleppo Governorate, Syria
- Date: 13 November 2017; 8 years ago ~2:00 PM (local time)
- Target: Free Syrian police station
- Attack type: Airstrike
- Weapon: Aerial bombs
- Deaths: 84
- Injuries: 150
- Perpetrator: Russian Air Force
- Motive: Unknown

The Atarib market massacre, Atarib market bombings or 2017 Atarib airstrike were three aerial bombardments on a marketplace in the Syrian rebel-held town of Atarib in the Aleppo Governorate of Syria perpetrated on 13 November 2017, during the Syrian Civil War. These airstrikes hit a commercial street with a market and a police station. The bombings killed 84 civilians, including six women and five children, and injured another 150 people. Atarib was part of the "Safe Zone" established in September 2017.

"Under the laws of war, police and police stations are presumptively civilian objects unless the police are taking a direct part in the hostilities", Human Rights Watch said. Eyewitness reports claimed that the entire market, containing 100 shops, was destroyed in the explosions. They damaged or destroyed an area of approximately 5,000 sq metres. Weapons used were the unguided OFAB-500 fragmentation bomb, and the BETAB-500 unguided bunker buster bomb.

On 6 March 2018, the United Nations Human Rights Council published a public report confirming that these airstrikes were perpetrated by the Russian military. A Russian fixed-wing aircraft using unguided weapons, including blast weapons, were used against this location. The report concluded that using such heavy weapons on densely populated civilian areas may amount to a war crime.

== Events ==
Between 14:07 and 14:11, the Atarib market and police station were targeted by three air strikes resulting in the death of at least 84 people and injuring of 150.

=== UN investigation ===
On 6 March 2018, the United Nations Independent International Commission of Inquiry on the Syrian Arab Republic published a report on the attack, saying it was carried out by the Russian Air Force and may constitute a war crime.

According to the Commission's report, "early warning observers monitored the take-off of a fixed-wing aircraft, whose pilots communicated in Russian, from Hemeimeem airbase at 1:37 p.m. and tracked the aircraft going south and then to the northeast all the way to Atarib where it arrived at 2:07 p.m". The report said the attack "may account to a war crime of launching indiscriminate attacks resulting in death and injury to civilians."

=== Human Rights Watch ===
"Under the laws of war, police and police stations are presumptuously civilian objects unless the police are taking a direct part in the hostilities", Human Rights Watch said. Eyewitness reports claimed that the entire market, containing 100 shops, was destroyed in the explosions. They damaged or destroyed an area of approximately 5,000 sq metres. Weapons used were the unguided OFAB-500 fragmentation bomb, and the BETAB-500 unguided bunker buster bomb.

Two previous attacks had targeted the market on 25 July 2016 (8 dead) and 24 April 2014 (31 dead).

== See also ==
- Armanaz massacre
- April 2016 Idlib bombings
