= List of massacres during the Syrian civil war =

Human toll of the Syrian civil war
- Pre-war population 22 ±.5; Internally displaced 6 ±.5, Refugees 5.5 ±.5, Fatalities 0.5 ±.1 (millions)

Syrian refugees
- By country: Turkey, Lebanon, Egypt, Jordan
- Settlements: Camps: Jordan

Internally displaced Syrians

Casualties of the war
- Crimes: War crimes, massacres, rape

This is a list of massacres committed during the Syrian civil war.

== 2011 ==
- Between 4 and 12 June 2011, during the Jisr Al-Shughur clashes, a massacre against Syrian soldiers and security forces was committed by armed insurgents, with over a hundred dead. They were ambushed, executed, and dumped into a mass grave and were originally believed to have been defectors executed by the Syrian government for refusing to violently crack down on protesters, as reported by anti-Assad activists. This claim was met with skepticism at the time by various observers on Syria until Lebanese-Australian journalist Rania Abouzeid uncovered the truth behind the massacre from local testimonies as being the work of insurgents.
- Between 31 July and 4 August 2011, during the Siege of Hama, Syrian government forces reportedly killed more than 100 people in an assault on the city of Hama. Opposition activists later raised their estimated civilian death toll to 200 dead.
- Between 19 and 20 December 2011, a massacre allegedly occurred in the Jabal al-Zawiya mountains of Idlib Governorate. The killings started after a large group of soldiers tried to defect from Army positions over the border to Turkey. Intense clashes between the military and the defectors, who were supported by other rebel fighters, erupted. After two days of fighting, 235 defectors, 100 pro-government soldiers and 120 civilians were killed.

== 2012 ==
- On 27 February 2012, during the 2012 Homs offensive, the Syrian Observatory for Human Rights reported that 68 bodies were found between the villages of Ram al-Enz and Ghajariyeh and were taken to the central hospital of Homs. The wounds showed that some of the dead were shot while others were killed by cutting weapons. The Rebel Local Coordination Committees reported that 64 dead bodies were found. The rebels claimed that the victims were civilians who tried to flee the battle in Homs and were then killed by a pro-government militia.
- On 9 March 2012, during the 2012 Homs offensive, 30 tanks of the Syrian Army entered the quarter of Karm al-Zeitoun. After this, it was reported that the Syrian Army had massacred 47 women and children in the district (26 children and 21 women), some of whom had their throats slit, according to activists. The opposition claimed that the main perpetrators behind the killings were the government paramilitary force the Shabiha.
- On 5 April, the military captured Taftanaz's city center after a two-hour battle, following which the army reportedly carried out a massacre by rounding up and executing people. At least 62 people were killed. It was unknown how many were opposition fighters and how many were civilians.
- On 25 May 2012, the Houla massacre occurred in two opposition-controlled villages in the Houla region of Syria, a cluster of villages north of Homs. According to the United Nations, 108 people were killed, including 34 women and 49 children. UN investigators reported that witnesses and survivors provided two conflicting narratives. The Syrian government alleged that Al-Qaeda terrorist groups were responsible for the killings, and that Houla residents were warned not to speak publicly by opposition forces.
- On 29 May 2012, a mass execution was discovered near the eastern city of Deir ez-Zor. The unidentified corpses of 13 men had been discovered shot to death execution-style. On 5 June 2012, the rebel Al-Nusra Front claimed responsibility for the killings, stating that they had captured and interrogated the soldiers in Deir ez-Zor and "justly" punished them with death, after they confessed to crimes.
- On 31 May 2012, there were reports of a massacre in the Syrian village of al-Buwaida al-Sharqiya. According to sources, 13 factory workers were allegedly rounded up and shot dead by pro-government forces.
- On 6 June 2012, the Al-Qubeir massacre occurred in the small village of Al-Qubeir near Hama. According to preliminary evidence, troops had surrounded the village which was followed by pro-government Shabiha militia entering the village and killing civilians with "barbarity," UN Secretary-General Ban Ki-moon told the UN Security Council. The death toll, according to opposition activists, was estimated to be between 55 and 68. Activists, and witnesses, stated that scores of civilians, including children, had been killed by Shabiha militia and security forces, while the Syrian government said that nine people had been killed by "terrorists".
- On 23 June 2012, 25 local Shabiha policemen POWs were killed by Syrian rebels in the city of Darat Izza. They were part of a larger group of POWs captured by the rebels. The fate of the others POWs was unknown. Many of the corpses of the shabiha militia killed were in military uniform.
- Between 20 and 25 August 2012, a massacre was reported in the town of Darayya in the Rif Dimashq province. Between 320 and 500 people were killed in a five-day Army assault on the town, which was rebel-held. At least 18 of the dead were identified as rebels. According to the opposition, Human Rights Watch and some local residents the killings were committed by the Syrian military and Shabiha militiamen. According to the government and some local residents they were committed by rebel forces. Syrian Air Force Intelligence Directorate (SAFI) officer Qahtan Khalil later became widely known as the "Butcher of Darayya" for his leadership role in the massacre. In 2021, Khalil and other SAFI officers were sanctioned as Specially Designated Nationals by the United States for their role. Khalil was named head of SAFI in January 2024. Khalil's appointment was controversial due to his role in the massacre.
- Between 8 and 13 October 2012, during the Battle of Maarrat Al-Nu'man, the Syrian Army was accused by the opposition of executing 65 people, including 50 defecting soldiers.
- On 11 December 2012, the Aqrab massacre, also known as the Aqrab bombings, occurred in the predominantly Alawite village of Aqrab, Hama Governorate. Between 125 and 200 people were reported killed or wounded, when rebel fighters threw bombs at a building in which hundreds of Alawite civilians, with some pro-government militiamen, were taking refuge from the fighting that had been raging in the town. Most of the victims were Alawites. The culprits behind the massacre are disputed. According to the pro-opposition Syrian Observatory of Human Rights, the massacre would be the largest sectarian-motivated "revenge attack" against Alawites up to that point if the rebels were indeed guilty.
- On 23 December 2012, the Syrian government was accused of committing a massacre in the small town of Halfaya, where 23 people were confirmed dead. Pro-opposition activists claimed that as many as 300 people were killed by bombing from warplanes. The civilians were allegedly queuing for bread at a bakery. BBC correspondent Jim Muir noted however, that it is inconclusive from video evidence that the building was indeed a bakery. He also noted that of the 23 people identified as dead – all of them were men. Muir added: "it is not out of the question that regime jets managed to strike a concentration of rebel fighters," adding to questions surrounding the incident.

== 2013 ==
- On 15 January 2013, government troops stormed the village of Basatin al-Hasawiya on the outskirts of Homs city were accused of committing a massacre of 106 civilians, including women and children, by shooting, stabbing or possibly burning them to death.
- On 15 January 2013, twin explosions killed 87 people at Aleppo's university, many of them students attending exams. The government and opposition blamed each other for the explosions at the university. Pro-opposition activists and monitors like the Syrian Observatory for Human Rights and the Syrian Network for Human Rights blamed the Syrian government, whereas CNN claimed that anonymous students at the University heard warplanes overhead during the explosion and suspected the government as being responsible. It is worth noting that the university was located in an area of Aleppo that was under government control, and housed roughly 30,000 internally displaced Syrians who had fled other parts of the city that were taken over by rebel forces.
- Between 29 January and 14 March 2013, opposition activists claimed that they found about 230 bodies on the banks and in the Queiq River in Aleppo, and accused government forces of being responsible for executing the men since the bodies came down the river from the direction of government-held areas of the city. Human Rights Watch was able to identify at least 147 victims, all male and aged between 11 and 64.
- On 23 March 2013, a chemical weapons attack targeted the town of Khan al-Assal, on the outskirts of Aleppo. 25–31 people were killed. The Syrian government and the rebels traded blame for the attack, but the pro-opposition Syrian Observatory for Human Rights stated that 16 of the dead were government soldiers. According to the government, 21 of the dead were civilians, while 10 were soldiers. Russia supported the government's allegations, while the United States claimed there was no evidence of any attack at all. The Syrian government reached an agreement with the United Nations in July 2013 to allow investigators to inspect the Khan Al-Assal site, alongside at least two other alleged chemical weapon attacks that occurred in Saraqeb and Sheikh Maqsoud. The team, led by Swedish scientist Ake Sellstrom arrived on 18 August 2013, just three days before the larger Ghouta chemical attack happened in the outskirts of Damascus, which placed the investigations into the Khan Al-Assal incident on hold.
- Between 16 and 21 April, during the Battle of Jdaidet al-Fadl, the Syrian Army was accused by the opposition of carrying out a massacre. The pro-opposition SOHR claimed that 250 people were killed since the start of the battle, with them being able to document, by name, 127 of the dead, including 27 rebels. Another opposition claim put the death toll at 450. One activist source claimed he counted 98 bodies in the town's streets and 86 in makeshift clinics who were summarily executed. Another activist stated they documented 85 people who were executed, including 28 who were killed in a makeshift hospital.
- On 16 April 2013, Syrian intelligence forces massacred around 280 civilians in the Damascus neighborhood of Tadamon. The victims were individually led into a pre-dug mass grave and executed at close range. The victims included women and children. Further killings in the area are alleged. The massacre was not widely reported at the time, and only became known in 2022 after video evidence surfaced of the incident.
- Between 27 April and 5 July 2013, during the rebel siege of the Aleppo Central Prison more than 120 prisoners were killed. Most died due to malnutrition and lack of medical treatment due to the siege, as well as rebel bombardment on the prison. On 1 June, during the siege, an opposition activist group claimed 50 prisoners were executed by government forces, while another group reported that, up to that point, 40 government soldiers and 31 prisoners had been killed in rebel shelling of the prison complex. On 7 February 2014, SOHR stated 600 prisoners had died since the start of the rebel siege of the prison. The death toll was updated to 800 by 15 April.
- Between 2 and 3 May 2013, the Bayda and Baniyas massacres occurred in which pro-government militiamen allegedly killed between 128 and 450 people in the Tartus Governorate, apparently in retaliation for an earlier rebel attack near the town that left at least half a dozen soldiers dead. State media stated their forces were seeking only to clear the area of "terrorists". In all, the military claimed that they killed 40 "terrorists" in Bayda and Baniyas. According to a UN report, between 300 and 450 people were killed.
- On 14 and 16 May 2013, two videos surfaced of the execution of government soldiers by Islamic extremists in eastern Syria. In one, members of the groups Islamic State of Iraq and Bilad al-Sham shot dead three prisoners in the middle of a square in Raqqa city, whom they alleged were Syrian Army officers. It was later revealed that two of the three killed prisoners were not Syrian Army officers, but Alawite civilians. One was a dentist and the other was his nephew, a teacher. The other video showed the Al-Nusra Front executing 11 government soldiers in the eastern Deir al-Zor province. That video is believed to have dated back to some time in 2012.
- The Hatla massacre occurred on 11 June 2013, when Syrian rebels killed between 30 and 60 Shi'ite villagers, mostly unarmed, in the village of Hatla near Deir el-Zor. The killings were reportedly in retaliation for an attack by Shi'ite pro-government fighters from the village, a day earlier, in which four rebels were killed. Some pro-opposition activists claimed that most of the dead were pro-government fighters but civilians were killed as well, including women and children. Rebels also burned civilian houses during the takeover. 10 rebel fighters were killed during the attack. 150 Shi'ite residents fled to the nearby government-held village of Jafra. Videos of the incident however, emerged showing fighters using explicitly sectarian language in the massacre's aftermath.
- Between 22 July 2013 and 31 August 2016, during the government siege of the Yarmouk Camp 187 people died due to malnutrition and lack of medical care.
- On 18 June 2013, 20 people were killed in a Grad missile attack on the home of Parliament member Ahmad al-Mubarak, who is also the head of the Bani Izz clan, in the town of Abu Dala. Opposition activists claimed that he was killed by government forces. However, Ahmad al-Mubarak was a well-known government supporter and one of his aids was executed by rebels a week earlier.
- On 22 and 23 July 2013, rebel forces attacked and captured the town of Khan al-Asal, west of Aleppo. During the takeover more than 150 soldiers were killed, including at least 51 soldiers and officers who were summarily executed after being captured. Several executions of soldiers in the village of Hara in the province of Deraa were also reported.
- Between 27 and 30 July 2013, the al-Nusra Front and ISIL killed between 50 and 70 residents in Tell Aran and Tell Hassel after they captured the Kurdish enclaves from the Kurdish Front.
- Between 4 and 19 August 2013, rebel factions reportedly carried out massacres of at least 190 civilians in several Alawite villages north of Al-Haffeh in Lattakia governorate. According to Human Rights Watch, at least 67 civilians were summarily executed. The rebel coalitions also held 200 people, mostly women and children, as hostages, whose fates remained unknown.
- On 21 August, the Syrian government was accused by anti-government activists of committing the Ghouta chemical attack, which struck Jobar, Zamalka, 'Ain Tirma, and Hazzah in the Eastern Ghouta region. Estimated death tolls ranged from 281 to 1,729 fatalities. Ac
- On 10 September, rebels attacked the Alawite village of Maksar al-Hesan, in Homs province, killing 22 civilians, including women, children and elderly men. 16 of the dead were Alawites while six were Arab Bedouins. Rebels later admitted to the killing of 30 civilians overall in three Alawite villages, includes those in Maksar al-Hesan.
- On 19 September, a rebel bombing targeting one or two buses in Homs province left between 14 and 19 Alawite civilians dead.
- Between 21 and 28 October, during the Battle of Sadad, rebel fighters reportedly committed a massacre in the town of Sadad in the Homs countryside. The bodies of 46 civilians, including 15 women, were discovered in the town after the rebels withdrew. The opposition activist group the pro-opposition SOHR called it a massacre. 30 of the dead were reportedly found in two mass graves. Another 10 civilians remained missing. This was considered the worst single massacre of Christians to date during the war.
- On 30 November, a barrel bomb was allegedly dropped by a Syrian government helicopter in Al Bab, Aleppo killing at least 20 people
- On 6 December, during the Battle of Qalamoun, government forces reportedly killed at least 18 people, including children, in an underground shelter in the government-held Al-Fattah district of An-Nabk. The opposition claimed that government troops torched the bodies after the killings "in a bid to conceal their crime". The next day, the number of those killed was updated to 40.
- On 11 December, the Adra massacre occurred, when rebel groups affiliated with the Islamic Front and Al-Nusra infiltrated the industrial area of the town of Adra, northeast of Damascus, attacking buildings housing workers and their families. The rebels targeted Alawites, Druze, Christians and Shiites, killing them on a sectarian basis. Some people were shot while others were reportedly beheaded. The killings lasted into the next day. In all some 19–40 civilians from minority communities were massacred, as the rebels captured the industrial part of Adra. 18 pro-government militiamen were also reportedly killed, Several rebels died when a Shiite man allegedly blew himself up along with them and his family after the rebels attempted to kill them. On 13 December, the military surrounded Adra and started an operation to push out rebel fighters from the area. By 15 December, the number of minority civilians confirmed killed in the rebel attack on Adra had risen to 32. Dozens of others were missing. The Syrian government claimed that more than 80 people were killed by Islamist rebels, with the most of them being civilians.
- Between 15 and 28 December, activists accused the Syrian government of launching helicopter attacks with barrel bombs against rebel-held areas of Aleppo, leaving 517 people dead, including 151 children, 46 women and 46 rebels, according to the SOHR. 76 of those killed died on the first day alone, while 93–100 people were killed on 22 December. By 18 December 879 people were wounded. During the first four days the attacks were concentrated on Aleppo city, but on 19 December, the helicopter strikes were expanded to include surrounding villages. A rebel commander claimed that by 26 December, more than 1,000 people had been killed in the bombing campaign. By the end of 6 January, the death toll in the bombings had risen to 603, including 172 children, 54 women and 52 rebels. On 9 January, aid groups alleged that more than 700 people were killed since the start of the bombing campaign.

== 2014 ==
- On 9 February 2014, rebels of the Jund al-Aqsa group attacked and captured the Alawite village of Maan, in Hama province, killing 21 civilians, 10 of them from a single family, during the takeover of the village, according to the SOHR. 20 pro-government militiamen were also killed in the attack. Syrian government sources claims that around 60 civilians were killed by the Saudi-backed Islamic Front.
- On 18 February 2014, a barrel bomb was dropped by a helicopter in Muzayrib, Daraa killing at least 18 people, 16 of them were Palestinian refugees.
- On 29 April, the rebel jihadist group Jabhat Al-Nusra planted two car bombs, which exploded in the Al-Abassiyeh neighborhood in Homs city, killing more than 100 people, most of whom were civilians.
- In mid-August Islamic State fighters massacred some 700 people, mostly men, of the Shu'aytat tribe in Deir ez-Zor Governorate. The death toll was updated in mid-December to more than 900 after the discovery of a mass grave containing 230 bodies. Other sources put the death toll above 1,000. It was considered the largest massacre committed by ISIS in Syria at the time.
- On 28 August 2014, Islamic State militants massacred dozens of captured Syrian soldiers near Tabqa. The footage, which was posted on YouTube, showed prisoners stripped to their underwear being marched across the desert. ISIS claimed to have executed 250 prisoners total, while SOHR was only able to confirm the deaths of 120.
- On 1 October 2014, the Akrama Elementary School bombings killed up to 54 people near the Akrama Al-Makhzoumi Elementary School in the Alawite-majority neighborhood of Akrama in Homs. 47 children, all under the age of 12 were counted among the dead. The group suspected of carrying out the attack was Jund Al-Sham according to local security sources.

== 2015 ==
- On 21 February, according to the pro-opposition SOHR monitoring group, at least 48 people were killed in Rityan when Syrian government forces executed six families of rebel fighters.
- On 15 March, according to Aranews, at least 20 people were killed and hundreds others wounded after government warplanes bombarded the residential neighborhoods in Duma city in the eastern Ghouta of Damascus. Medical sources from field hospitals in the city reported that victims included women and children, adding that the airstrikes caused mass destruction of several residential buildings.
- On 28 March, during the Second Battle of Idlib, SOHR reported that Syrian forces had executed 15 prisoners who were being held at the military intelligence headquarters.
- On 31 March, Islamic State militants committed a massacre of 46–48 civilians in the village of Mabuja, in Hama province, before the Army managed to repel their attack. The subsequent fighting also left 6–31 soldiers and reportedly 40 ISIL militants dead. The victims were either shot dead, burned or stabbed.
- On 25 April, during the 2015 Northwestern Syria offensive, 23 prisoners were executed by Syrian government forces before their withdrawal from the area of the National Hospital in Jisr al-Shughur, according to the SOHR monitoring group.
- On 28 April, the SOHR was able to confirm that Islamic State militants had executed a total of 2,154 people since 28 June 2014, with 1,362 being civilians, 529 government soldiers, 137 rebels and 126 Islamic State deserters.
- During the Palmyra offensive, on 14 and 15 May 49 people were executed by ISIL forces in Amiriya and al-Sukhnah. Following the battle on 22 May, various pro-opposition sources in the city reported ISIL had executed between 150 and up to 280 government loyalists and soldiers in the streets, while Syrian state TV put the number at 400 killed.
- On 29 May, during the Al-Hasakah offensive, according to the SOHR, YPG forces executed at least 20 civilians accused of supporting ISIL in the village of Abo Shakhat. The SOHR also reported that 30 civilians were killed by ISIL forces while trying to escape fighting in Nis Tal on the Syrian–Turkish border.
- On 11 June, the Al-Nusra Front killed at least 20 Druze villagers in Qalb Lawzeh in Idlib province. Although the massacre was initiated by a shootout by local villagers and Al-Nusra, most the victims were civilians who were accused of being Syrian government supporters.
- On 26 June, ISIL fighters entered the city of Kobane dressed up as YPG fighters and starting to shoot at civilians. More than 200 civilians were killed.
- On 16 August, the Syrian Air Force was accused of deliberately launched strikes on the rebel-held town of Douma, northeast of Damascus, killing at least 96 civilians and injuring at least 200 others.
- On 15 September 38 people, including 14 children, were killed by rebel rocket fire on government-held district of Aleppo.
- On 17 September, government helicopters was accused of dropping barrel bombs in FSA-held Bosra that struck a busy market place packed with shoppers and people buying necessities for children returning to school that week, killing between 17 and 24.
- On 30 October, another 65 people were killed and 250 injured in government airstrikes targeting a marketplace in the city of Douma.

== 2016 ==
- On 16 January, around 300 civilians were massacred and 400 kidnapped in Deir ez-Zor after ISIL took control of the northern suburbs of the city.
- On 20 March, from the Kafr Saghir massacre, ISIL killed more than 20 Kurdish and Arab civilians in the eastern Aleppo town of Kafr Saghir.
- Between 22 April and 18 July, bombardment across Aleppo city left 914 civilians dead. Mutual bombardment between both government and rebel forces killed 878 (525 by government air-strikes and shelling, and 353 by rebel shelling). 23 civilians died due to rebel shelling of a Kurdish-held area of the city. Six civilians died due to Kurdish sniper fire. 7 civilians also died when a rebel mortar shell plant exploded.
- On 5 May 30 people died in the Kamuna refugee camp massacre.
- On 12 May, at least 19 civilians were killed by the Al-Nusra Front and Ahrar al-Sham in the Alawite village of Zarah, in Hama province. 100 others were reportedly kidnapped. After negotiations by the Syrian Red Crescent, the bodies of 42 civilians were recovered from the town on 25 May.

== 2017 ==
- On 16 March, United States Armed Forces launched an airstrike in the rebel-held village of Al-Jinah near Aleppo, killing between 38 to 49 people and 26 to 100 were injured.
- On 4 April, the Syrian government killed at least 89 people and injured 541 others in the Khan Shaykhun chemical attack.
- On 30 April, at least 11 people were killed after the Syrian Air Force dropped a barrel bomb near Daraa. Four children were reportedly among the dead.
- On 26 September, as many as 70–80 people were killed in the desert by Syrian government forces, according to witnesses.
- On 29 September, Syrian government and/or Russian airstrikes allegedly killed at least 34 people in Armanaz.
- Between 1 and 21 October, ISIL massacred around 128 people in the mixed Muslim-Christian town of Al-Qaryatayn in the Eastern Homs countryside, after recapturing the town from the Syrian Army a second time. 83 people were allegedly killed in the last 48 hours of their rule before the Syrian Army entered the town. The residents were accused of cooperating with the Syrian government against ISIL rule. ISIL previously controlled the town on 5 August 2015, during which they abducted 230 civilians, including 60 of its Christian residents. It also demolished the Syriac Christian Monastery of St. Elian, parts of which are more than 1,500 years old.
- On 13 November, Russian Air Force conducted an airstrike with unguided bombs on a crowded market in Atarib, resulting in 84 deaths.

== 2018 ==
- On 29 January, at least 33 people were killed by Syrian government airstrikes, according to the Syrian Network for Human Rights.
- On 4 February 16 civilians were killed after the Syrian government dropped two barrel bombs in the northern Idlib province.
- Between 5 and 8 February, Syrian government forces killed 213 civilians in eastern Ghouta, including 54 children and 41 women, according to the Syrian Observatory for Human Rights. An additional 700 civilians were injured in the attacks.
- Between 18 and 22 February, at least 417 people have been killed in eastern Ghouta, including 96 children, according to the Syrian Observatory for Human Rights. More than 2,100 people have been wounded. Planes have struck residential areas and, according to medical charities, hit more than a dozen hospitals, making it near impossible to treat the wounded. On 1 March, the Syrian Civil Defense reported that 674 civilians were killed in eastern Ghouta since 18 February.
- On 7 April, at least 70 people were killed in a chemical attack in Douma.
- On 25 July a string of suicide bombings and gun attacks took place in and around As-Suwayda, killing at least 258 people and injuring 180 others.

== 2019 ==
- On 18 March, the United States launched an airstrike which killed 80 people, most of them women and children according to the New York Times. The incident was kept secret by the U.S. military until it was reported in 2021 by the New York Times. The US Central Command said that the attack was justified because it killed Islamic State fighters.
- On 20 November, Qah was struck by a ground-to-ground missile from the Syrian Government with Russian and Iranian support. It killed at least 15 people, including six children.

== 2023 ==
- On 5 October 2023, a Syrian military graduation ceremony at the Homs Military Academy was targeted by a drone strike, leaving over 112 people dead and over 120 injured.

== 2024 ==
- On 6 June 2024, Six shepherds were killed in a massacre by suspected ISIS militants in the village of Abu Al-Alya village, in the eastern countryside of Homs.

== 2025 ==
- On 24 January 2025, after the fall of the Assad regime, a field execution reportedly happened in the village of Fahil near Homs by gunmen affiliated with the new Syrian government led by Hay'at Tahrir Al-Sham while conducting a security operation allegedly targeting remnants of the previous regime. SOHR confirmed the deaths of 13 people and 50 others arrested and taken to an unknown location. Local witnesses claimed up to 58 people dead. All of the victims were men and of the Alawite sect.
- On 30 January 2025, SOHR reported that 10 civilians were executed by unknown gunmen in Arzah village in the north-western countryside of Homs. The gunmen knocked on the doors of several houses in the village and opened fire on civilians, using guns with silencers, and then fled.
- On 8 March 2025, SOHR reported that Syrian security forces and pro-government fighters had committed a massacre of more than 740 Alawite civilians during clashes in western Syria. This reported number grew to 1,557 civilians by 17 March.
- Amid clashes in Suwayda Governorate beginning on July 13, 2025, SOHR alleged that 823 people were summarily executed by personnel belonging to Syria's Ministry of Defence and Ministry of the Interior in violence largely targeting Druze people. An Amnesty International reported that it was able to corroborate at least 46 of the executions.

== See also ==
- List of massacres in Syria
- List of Syrian Civil War barrel bomb attacks
- Syrian mass graves
- Use of chemical weapons in the Syrian civil war
