= Kamuna refugee camp massacre =

Atrocity during the Syrian civil war

- Part of the Syrian civil war
- Location: Sarmada region, Idlib Governorate, Syria
- Date: 5 May 2016
- Attack type: Air strike (unverified)
- Deaths: 28–30
- Perpetrator: Syrian Air Force or Russian Air Force (unverified early reports)

The Kamuna refugee camp massacre, also known as al-Kamouna refugee camp massacre or the Sarmada camp air strike, occurred on 5 May 2016, during the Syrian civil war. The camp was close to the Turkish border, in Idlib province about 40 kilometres (25 mi) west of Aleppo. Between 28 and 30 people were killed in the Kamuna refugee camp near Sarmada, northern Syria, initially reported to be by bombing from warplanes. Children were among the killed. The attack came during the truce negotiations between the warring factions.

Witnesses state that the camp was struck twice, causing many tents to be set on fire.

== Events ==
After the forces of Bashar al-Assad conducted an offensive on Aleppo in April 2016, an informal settlement, Ghita Al-Rahmeh, near the village of Al-Kamoneh, was assembled to host over 2,500 refugees (450 families) who fled from Aleppo towards the north. There were no military targets near the refugee camp, and it was clearly visible from the sky. At that time, the war planes flying over the province were typically those of the Syrian Armed Forces and the Russian Air Forces.

UN Secretary-General Ban Ki-moon and other United Nations officials condemned the attack and declared it a possible war crime. Ki-moon once again urged the Security Council to refer the situation in Syria to the International Criminal Court (ICC). The UNCHR called the attack a "shocking disregard for civilian life" and described it as a "flagrant violation of international humanitarian and human rights law".

Syrian military representatives stated that they had not targeted the camp. Russia stated that none of its aircraft had flown over the refugee camp, and its air-space monitoring data showed no flights by any aircraft over the camp. Russia's Defense Ministry officials stated that damage shown in photographs and video suggested the camp may have been hit by multiple launch rocket systems which were being used in the area by Al-Nusra. The OHCHR chief Zeid Ra'ad Al-Hussein said that the initial reports of the camp being hit by Syrian Air Force jets was not verified.

== See also ==
- List of massacres during the Syrian Civil War
- List of Syrian Civil War barrel bomb attacks
- Darayya massacre
