= Jay Rubenstein =

American historian of the Middle Ages (born 1967)

- Born: 1967 (age 58–59)

Academic background
- Education: Carleton College; St John's College, Oxford; University of California, Berkeley

Academic work
- Discipline: History
- Institutions: Dickinson College; Syracuse University; University of New Mexico; University of Tennessee; University of Southern California; USC Dana and David Dornsife College of Letters, Arts and Sciences

Jay Rubenstein (born 1967) is an American historian of the Middle Ages.

== Life ==
Rubenstein grew up in Cushing, Oklahoma and attended Carleton College in Northfield, Minnesota where he graduated with a B.A. in 1989. From 1989 to 1991 he studied at the University of Oxford as a Rhodes Scholar. In 1991 he completed an M.Phil. from Oxford, writing a thesis on the veneration of saints' relics in England after the Norman Conquest. In 1997, he received a Ph.D. in history from the University of California, Berkeley, working under the supervision of Professor Gerard Caspary. After leaving Berkeley he taught one year at Dickinson College, one year at Syracuse University, and seven years at the University of New Mexico.

He is currently a history professor at the USC Dana and David Dornsife College of Letters, Arts and Sciences and Director of the USC Center for the Premodern World. His published scholarship has focused on medieval intellectual history, monastic life, and the early crusade movement.

In recognition of his Rhodes Scholarship, his hometown of Cushing named a street after him.

== Awards ==
- 2012 – Ralph Waldo Emerson Award from Phi Beta Kappa for significant contributions to interpretations of the intellectual and cultural condition of humanity
- 2007 – MacArthur Fellows Program
- 2007 – National Endowment for the Humanities Fellowship
- 2006 – ACLS Burkhardt Fellowship
- 2004 – William Koren, Jr. Prize from the Society for French Historical Studies for an outstanding journal article published on any era of French history by a North American scholar
- 2002 – ACLS Fellowship

== Selected publications ==
- Nebuchadnezzar's Dream: The Crusades, Apocalyptic Prophecy, and the End of History. Oxford University Press. 2019. ISBN 978-0-190-27420-7.
- Armies of Heaven: The First Crusade and the Quest for Apocalypse. Basic Books. 2011. ISBN 978-0-465-01929-8.
- Guibert of Nogent (2011). Jay Rubenstein; Joseph McAlhany (eds.). Monodies and On the Relics of Saints: The Autobiography and a Manifesto of a French Monk from the Time of the Crusades. Penguin Classics. ISBN 978-0-14-310630-2.
- Rubenstein, Jay (2008). "Cannibals and Crusaders". French Historical Studies. 31 (4): 525–552. doi:10.1215/00161071-2008-005.
- Sally N. Vaughn; Jay Rubenstein, eds. (2006). Teaching and Learning in Northern Europe, 1000–1200. Brepols. ISBN 978-2-503-51419-2.
- "What Is the Gesta Francorum, and Who Is Peter Tudebode?" Revue Mabillon 16 (2005): 179–204.
- "Biography and Autobiography in the Middle Ages," in Writing Medieval History: Theory and Practice for the Post-Traditional Middle Ages, ed. Nancy Partner. Arnold: London, 2005, pp. 53–69.
- "Putting History to Use: Three Crusade Chronicles in Context," Viator: Medieval and Renaissance Studies 35 (2004): 131–168.
- Susan Janet Ridyard, ed. (2004). "How, or How Much, to Reevaluate Peter the Hermit". The Medieval Crusade. Boydell Press. ISBN 978-1-84383-087-0.
- Guibert of Nogent: Portrait of a Medieval Mind. Routledge. 2003. ISBN 978-0-415-93970-6.
- Stephen Morillo, ed. (2001). "Principled Passion or Ironic Detachment? The Gregorian Reform as Experienced by Guibert of Nogent". The Haskins Society Journal: Studies in Medieval History. Boydell Press. ISBN 978-0-85115-911-9.
- "Liturgy Against History: The Competing Visions of Lanfranc and Eadmer of Canterbury." Speculum 74 (1999): 271–301.
- Richard Eales; Richard Sharpe, eds. (1995). "The Life and Writings of Osbern of Canterbury". Canterbury and the Norman Conquest: Churches, Saints, and Scholars, 1066–1109. Continuum International Publishing Group. ISBN 978-1-85285-068-5.
