= Armanaz massacre =

- Part of the Syrian civil war
- Armanaz
- Location: 36°05′N 36°30′E; Idlib Governorate, Syria
- Date: 29 September 2017; 8:30 PM
- Target: Syrian civilians
- Attack type: Airstrike
- Weapon: Su-24
- Deaths: 38+
- Injuries: Unknown
- Perpetrator: Syrian Air Force or Russian Air Force

On 29 September 2017, aircraft attacked Armanaz and killed at least 35 people, including at least 3 children, according to 5 witnesses and photos and video footage analyzed by Human Rights Watch. The Syrian Observatory for Human Rights reported that the death toll included 8 children and 8 women.

== Prelude ==
The Syrian and Russian air forces carried out several attacks which hit civilian targets in the days prior to this one, killing 18 people in Qalaat al-Madiq on September 20 and 19 people, including at least 2 children, in Jisr al-Shughur on September 25.

== The attack ==
At around 8:30 pm, an aircraft dropped several munitions on a residential neighborhood close to the Al-Zahra mosque in Armanaz. At 10 pm, an aircraft returned and bombed the same location again, which forced the rescuers to abandon the scene. 30 residential buildings were destroyed in total. Video published online allegedly showed rescuers pulling children's bodies from the rubble.

== Reactions ==
Human Rights Watch called on belligerents in the Syrian conflict to refrain from using enhanced blast weapons like fuel-air explosives in populated areas.

== See also ==
- List of massacres during the Syrian Civil War
