= Ahmed ibn Merwan =

Arab lieutenant

- Military career
- Allegiance: Kerbogha
- Rank: Lieutenant
- Conflicts: First Crusade

Ahmed ibn Merwan was a Seljuk lieutenant in Kerbogha's army at the time of the First Crusade.

After the siege of Antioch by the Crusaders, Ahmed was entrusted with maintaining control of the still Muslim-held citadel within the city after Shams al-Dawlah, son of the governor Yağısıyan, fled. Following the 1098 Battle of Antioch, in which Kerbogha's forces were crushed, Ahmed offered to surrender the citadel to the Crusaders. However, as he refused to allow any prince's banner but Bohemond I of Antioch's to be flown over the citadel, it appears as though he had maintained a secret truce with Bohemond in the effect of a Crusader victory against Kerbogha. Following the transfer of the citadel to the Christians, Ahmed joined the ranks of the Crusaders and even converted to Western Christianity with the majority of his men. He is said to have lived thereafter in a house in Antioch.
