= Baldwin and Arnold of Beauvais =

Baldwin and Arnold (Ernoul) of Beauvais were brothers who participated in the First Crusade, although it is uncertain which army they were associated with. Their stories are recorded in the Chanson d'Antioche.

A fanciful tale of the brothers begins with Kerbogha (Carbaran), a Turkish general and Atabeg of Mosul, conceding defeat at the siege of Antioch and, along with a number of prisoners, returns the body of Brohadas, the son of the sultan of Persia, Rukn ad-Denya wa’d Din to Kermanshah. This story begines in the Chanson de Geste, an early French epic poem:

So Carbaran escaped across the plains of Syria

He took only two kings in his company

He carried away Brohadas, son of the Sultan of Persia

Who had been killed in the battle by the clean sword

Of the brave-spirited good duke Godfrey

Right in front of Antioch, down in the meadow.

As first related by Hippeau and excerpted by Setton, et al., the story becomes interesting, but perhaps with some semblance of truth. Disgraced by the loss at Antioch, Kerbogha and impressed by the fighting prowess of the Christians, he agrees to be put to death if any Christian selected by him cannot defeat two Saracens, contending that the former are better fighters. He selects Richard of Caumont (brother of Walo II of Chaumont-en-Vexin) who consents, in exchange for his freedom and that of his companions, to do battle with Goliath of Nicaea and Sorgalé of Mecca. Richard slays both. Goliath’s son and Sorgalé’s nephew attempt to murder Kerbogha and Richard but they are defeated.

As they are crossing the “land of Abraham,” presumably modern Israel, a dragon attacks Arnold and is slain by Baldwin. Other stories refer to the dragon as a snake, although it is more likely a member of Kerbogha’s contingent whose symbol is a dragon. As a result, Kerbogha is compelled to become a Christian.

The story continues as Kerbogha’s nephew, son of Queen Florie [whose identity is unknown] is carried off by a wolf. Harpin of Bourges [presumably Odo Arpin of Bourges or a relative] gives chase, only to see the child captured by a huge ape, and must fight off four lions and then five highwaymen to rescue the child. After this astonishing adventure, the Christian knights ride to join the other Crusaders in the siege of Jerusalem.

== Sources ==
Riley-Smith, Jonathan, The First Crusaders, 1095-1131, Cambridge University Press, London, 1997, pg 233

Prof. J. S. C. Riley-Smith, Prof, Jonathan Phillips, Dr. Alan V. Murray, Dr. Guy Perry, Dr. Nicholas Morton, A Database of Crusaders to the Holy Land, 1099-1149 (available on-line)

Setton, Kenneth M., Hazard, Harry W., Zacou, Norman P. (editors), A History of the Crusades: The Impact of the Crusades on Europe, University of Wisconsin Press, Madison, 1990 (available on Google Books)

Duparc-Quioc, S., (editor), La Chanson d'Antioche, 2 vols, Paris, 1977-1978

Sweetenham, Carol, The Chanson D'Antioche: An Old French Account of the First Crusade, Routledge, 2016 (available on Google Books)
