= Firouz =

11th-century Armenian armor maker

Firouz (sometimes referred to as Ruzbah) was a wealthy Armenian Christian convert to Islam and armor maker who held a high post in Yaghi-Siyan's Seljuk Turkish government during the Crusades. Notably, he also served as a spy for Bohemond during the Siege of Antioch. Bohemond had offered Firouz riches and safety guarantees in return for his assistance. Firouz was disgruntled with his position in Yaghi-Siyan's government, because he had been recently fined and his wife seduced by a senior Turkish officer. On June 3, 1098, Firouz, dissatisfied with his commanding officer, hung a rope ladder for Bohemond's men who subsequently climbed up into the city and opened its gates. Allowing the crusaders into the city, the local Armenians joined in the massacring of the Turks. The city subsequently became the center of the Principality of Antioch.

== See also ==
- Converts to Islam
- Islam in Armenia
