= Yağısıyan =

11th-century Seljuk military governor of Antioch, in command during the First Crusade

Governor of Antioch
- In office 1086–1098

Personal details
- Born: 1011
- Died: 1098 (aged 86–87) near Antioch (modern-day Antakya, Hatay, Turkey)

Military service
- Allegiance: Seljuq Empire
- Battles/wars: First Crusade: Siege of Antioch †

Yağısıyan, also known as Yaghi-Siyan (Turkish pronunciation: [ˈyaːɯsɯjan]; died 1098) was a Seljuk Turkoman commander and governor of Antioch in the 11th century. Although little is known about his personal life he was an important figure of the First Crusade.

== Governor of Antioch ==
In the 1080s most of Anatolia and Syria were ruled by two relatives of the Great Seljuk Empire sultan Malik-Shah I: Anatolia was ruled by Suleiman ibn Qutulmish, the sultan's cousin, and Syria by Tutush I, the sultan's brother. Between the two regions was the principality of Philaretos Brachamios, who, while paying nominal allegiance to the Byzantine Empire, was de facto an independent ruler over the region that also included Antioch (Turkish: Antakya).

Around 1084/1085, Suleiman succeeded in conquering the city from the Philaretos but when he tried to expand his domain to Aleppo in 1086, he was killed in battle against Tutush who proceeded to annex the city on behalf of Malik-Shah I. Yağısiyan was appointed as the governor of the city by the sultan the following year.

Malik-Shah I died in 1092, and his brother at Damascus, Tutush I, granted Yağısiyan more territory around Manbij and Turbessel. When Tutush died in 1095 fighting the son of Malik Shah, Berkyaruq; while Tutush's sons, Ridwan and Duqaq, fought for control of Syria, claiming Aleppo and Damascus, respectively. Yağısiyan, being the governor of a nearby city, became heavily involved in the ensuing power struggle in Syria. Although he collaborated with Ridwan to capture Urfa (Edessa) in 1096, next year he changed sides and supported Duqaq against Ridwan and his ally Sökmen. His army, however, was defeated. He had to accept Ridwan's supremacy.

Later in 1097, Ridwan quarreled with his tutor Janah ad-Dawla, with whom Yağısiyan had a personal vendetta, and Yağısiyan became more amenable to an alliance. This was completed by marrying his daughter to Ridwan. The two were about to attack Shaizar when news of the crusade arrived, and all parties retreated to their own territories in order to prepare for the coming attacks.

== First Crusade ==
Yaghi-Siyan's area of control within its regional political context in 1097 CE just before the arrival of the First Crusade, indicated on the map in purple and marked with the number 6.

When the news about the approaching army of the First Crusade reached Antioch, Yağısıyan, whose army of 6,000 was no match for the Crusaders, tried to form a united front to defend Antioch. However, because of jealousies between the Seljuk governors and the anarchy in the main sultanate after the death of Malik-Shah, he got very little support. Sökmen, whose principality was far to the east and far from the crusades' route, refused to assist Yağısıyan. Even Ridwan, whose domain was next to Antioch, sent only a small number of troops. According to David Nicolle, mistrust between Yağısiyan and Ridwan influenced the First Crusade.

Over the winter of 1097–98, Antioch was besieged by the Crusaders, and Yağısiyan sought help from Duqaq. He frequently sent out sorties against the Christian camp and attacked foraging parties further afield. Yağısiyan knew from his informants that there were dissensions among the Christians; both Raymond IV of Toulouse and Bohemund of Taranto wanted the city for themselves. While Bohemund was away foraging on 29 December 1097, Raymond attacked but was pushed back by Yağısiyan's troops. On 30 December reinforcements from Duqaq were defeated by Bohemund's foraging party and retreated to Homs.

Only after the beginning of the siege did Ridwan decide to leave Aleppo and challenge the crusaders. Ridwan's army was defeated in the Battle of the Lake of Antioch on 8–9 February 1098. While the crusader army was away from the city fighting Ridwan, Yağısiyan marched out to attack the foot-soldiers left behind to defend the camp, but he too was pushed back when the victorious crusaders returned. In March Yağısiyan ambushed the crusaders who were bringing wood and other material back from the port of St. Simeon; when the crusader camp at Antioch heard that Raymond and Bohemund had been killed, there was mass confusion, and Yağısiyan attacked the rest of the army under Godfrey of Bouillon. Bohemund and Raymond soon returned and Yağısiyan was once more pushed back into the city.

At this time the governor turned to Kerbogha, the atabeg of Mosul for help. The crusaders knew they had to take the city before Kerbogha's reinforcements arrived. Bohemund secretly negotiated with one of Yağısiyan's guards, an Armenian convert named Firouz, and on 3 June he helped Bohemund's men to open the gates of the city to crusaders.

== Death ==
On the night of June 3, 1098, the crusaders entered the city; Yağısiyan fled with his bodyguard, while his son Shams ad-Daulah stayed behind to defend the citadel. During his escape, Yağısiyan fell from his horse, and as his guards found it impossible to bring the injured governor with them, they left him on the ground and rode away without him. He was found by an Armenian who cut off his head and sent it as a gift to Bohemund.

== Aftermath ==
Antioch surrendered on 30 June. Antioch was claimed by both Bohemund and Raymond, with Raymond stationed in Yağısiyan's residence and Bohemund in the citadel. Their quarrel delayed the crusade for many months. However, Bohemund finally won out the argument, and thus declared the creation of the Principality of Antioch, which went on to exist for another 170 years.

The crusaders recorded Yağısiyan's name in various forms in Latin, including Acxianus, Gratianus, and Cassianus; the residence claimed by Raymond was known as the palatium Cassiani.

== Sources ==
- Nicolle, David (2011). First Crusade (1096-1099). İstanbul: Türkiye İş Bankası. ISBN 978-605-360-245-3.
- Altan, Ebru (2014). İslam Ansiklopedisi (Islam Encyclopaedia). İstanbul: Diyanet Vakfı.
- Albu, Emily (2015). "Antioch and the Normans". In Hurlock, Kathryn; Oldfield, Paul (eds.). Crusading and Pilgrimage in the Norman World. The Boydell Press.
- Grousset, René (1970). The Empire of the Steppes: A History of Central Asia. Translated by Walford, Naomi. Rutgers University Press.
- Yücel, Yaşar. Türkiye Tarihi I. İstanbul: AKDTYK Yayınları.
