= Battle of Antioch (1098) =

Part of the First Crusade

- Part of the First Crusade
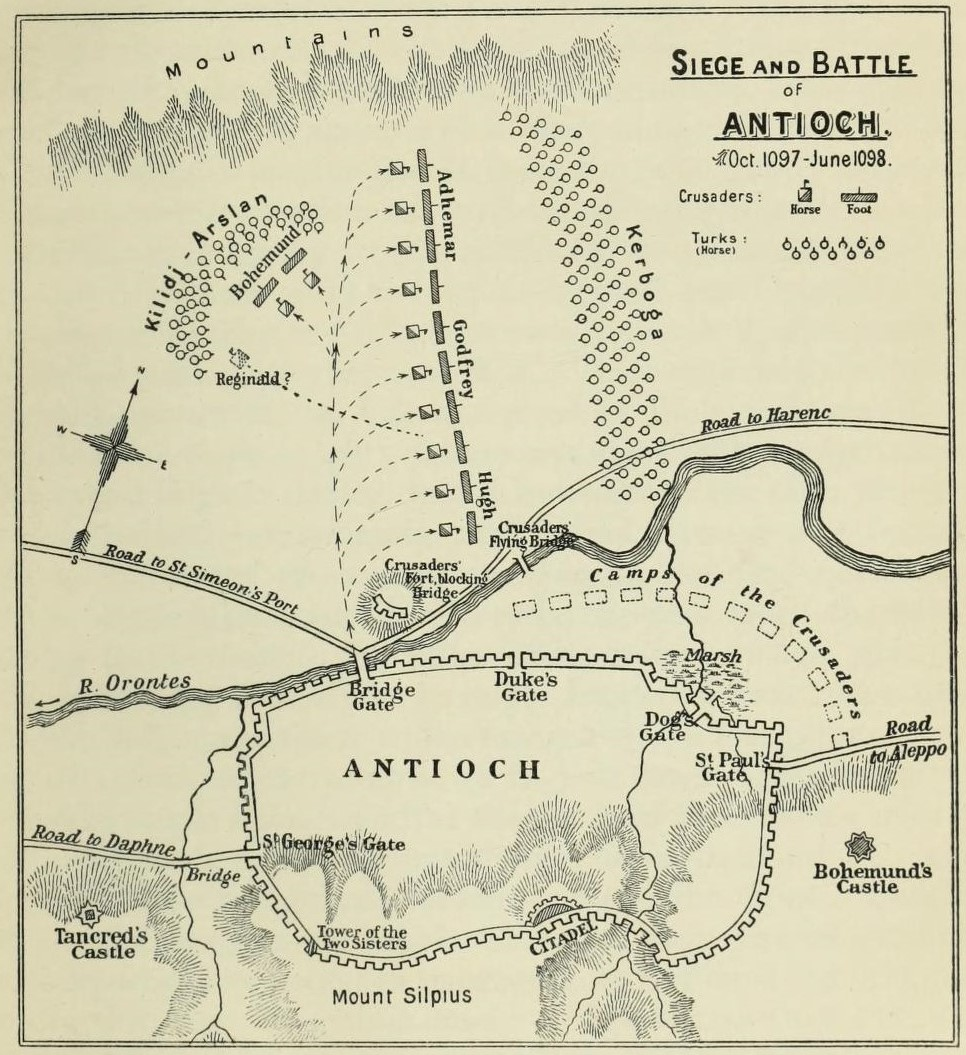
- Map of the siege and the battle of Antioch in 1097 and 1098 (1898)
Date	28 June 1098
Location	Antioch (present-day Antakya, Turkey)
Result	Crusader victory

Belligerents
Crusaders	Seljuk Empire; Emirate of Mosul; Emirate of Damascus; Emirate of Homs; Various other Muslim Emirates

Commanders and leaders
Bohemond of Taranto; Raymond IV of Toulouse; Adhemar of Le Puy; Godfrey of Bouillon; Robert II of Normandy; Robert II of Flanders; Hugh of Vermandois; Eustace III of Boulogne; Baldwin II of Hainaut; Tancred of Hauteville; Rainald III of Toul; Gaston IV of Béarn; Anselm of Ribemont	Kerbogha; Duqaq; Toghtekin; Janah ad-Dawla; Arslan-Tasch of Sindjar; Qaradja of Harran; Watthab ibn-Mahmud; Balduk of Samosata; Soqman ibn Ortoq; Ahmad ibn-Marwan (surrendered)

Strength
~20,000	~35,000–40,000

Casualties and losses
Unknown	Heavy

The Battle of Antioch (1098) was a military engagement fought between the Christian forces of the First Crusade and a Muslim coalition led by Kerbogha, atabeg of Mosul. Kerbogha's goal was to reclaim Antioch from the Crusaders and affirm his position as a regional power.

== The conflict begins ==
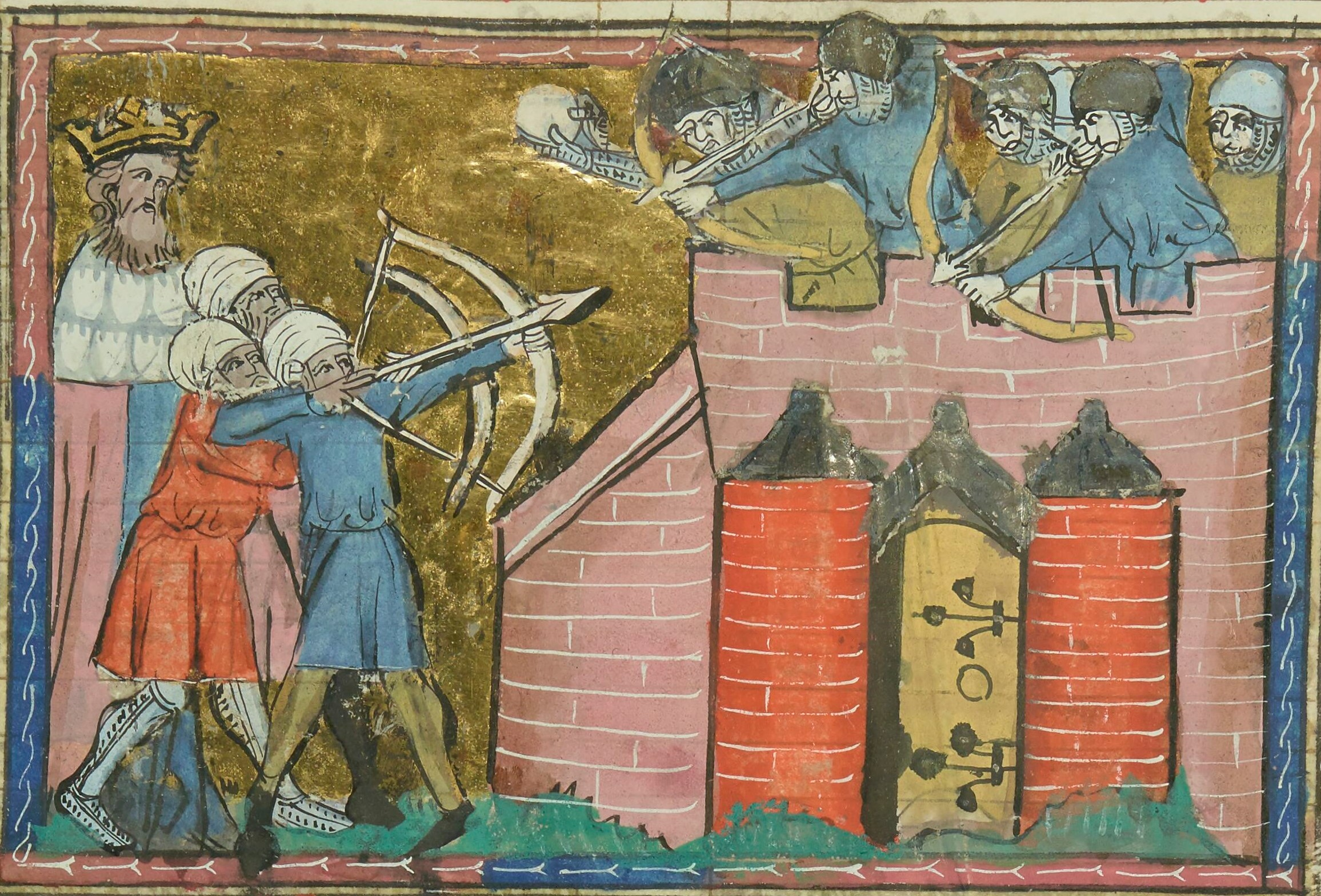
An illustration of Kerbogha besieging Antioch, from a 14th-century manuscript in the care of the Bibliothèque nationale de France

As the starving and outnumbered Crusaders emerged from the gates of the city and divided into six regiments, Kerbogha's commander, Watthab ibn Mahmud, urged him to immediately strike their advancing line. However, Kerbogha was concerned a preemptive strike might only destroy the Crusader's front line and may also significantly weaken his own forces disproportionately. However, as the French continued to advance against the Turks, Kerbogha began to grasp the severity of the situation (he previously underestimated the size of the crusading army), and attempted to establish an embassy between him and the Crusaders in order to broker a truce. However, it was too late for him, and the leaders of the crusade ignored his emissary.

== Battle maneuvers ==
Kerbogha, now backed against a corner by the advancing French, opted to adopt a more traditional Turkish battle tactic. He would attempt to back his army up slightly in order to drag the French into unsteady land, while continuously pelting the line with horse archers, meanwhile making attempts to outflank the French. However, Bohemond of Taranto was ready for this, and he created a seventh division of Crusaders led by Rainald III of Toul to hold off the attack. Soon, many emirs began to desert Kerbogha. Many of the Crusaders were also encouraged by the presumed visions of St. George, St. Mercurius, and Saint Demetrius among their ranks. Finally, Duqaq, ruler of Damascus, deserted, spreading panic among the ranks of the Turks. Sökmen and the emir of Homs, Janah ad-Dawla, were the last loyal to Kerbogha, but they too soon deserted after realizing the battle was lost. The whole Turkish army was now in complete disarray, all fleeing in different directions; the Crusaders chased them as far as the Iron Bridge, slaying many of them. Kerbogha went on to return to Mosul, defeated and stripped of his prestige.

== Bibliography ==
- Asbridge, Thomas (2004). The First Crusade: A New History. Oxford University Press. ISBN 9780195189056.
- Thomas Brosset, "The First Crusade and the Failure of Kerbogha’s Campaign from Mosul to Antioch (March–June 1098): A Re-evaluation", Al-Masāq, 24 Avril 2024, p. 1-23. https://doi.org/10.1080/09503110.2024.2342205.
- France, John (1996). Victory in the East: A Military History of the First Crusade. Cambridge University Press. ISBN 9780521589871.
- Runciman, Steven (1951). A History of the Crusades, Volume I: The First Crusade and the Foundation of the Kingdom of Jerusalem. Cambridge: Penguin Classics.
- Riley-Smith, Jonathan (1986). The First Crusade and the Idea of Crusading. University of Pennsylvania. ISBN 9780485112917.
- Rubenstein, Jay (2011). Armies of Heaven: The First Crusade and the Quest for Apocalypse. New York: Basic Books.
