= Rainald III of Toul =

11th century Count

Rainald III (died before 1124) was the count of Toul in Upper Lotharingia in the late 11th century. He was the son of Frederick I, count of Astenois.

== Biography ==
He participated in the First Crusade in the army of his kinsman Duke Godfrey of Bouillon. He was a prominent second tier lord of the Crusade. He assisted Baldwin of Boulogne in capturing and creating the Crusader state of Edessa. He later returned to the main Crusader army and distinguished himself in the Siege of Antioch, commanding the seventh division of the Crusader army during the battle against Kerbogha. After the successful Crusade he returned to Europe, where he died sometime before 1124.

== Sources ==
- France, John (1996). Victory in the East: A Military History of the First Crusade. Cambridge University Press.
- Riley-Smith, Jonathan (1997). The First Crusaders, 1095-1131. Cambridge University Press.
- Runciman, Steven (1951–52). A History of the Crusades I: The First Crusade. Penguin Classics. ISBN 978-0-141-98550-3.
