= Kerbogha =

11/12th-century ruler of Mosul

Qiwam al-Dawla Kerbogha (Turkish: Kürboğa), known as Kerbogha or Karbughā, was the Turkoman atabeg of Mosul during the First Crusade and was renowned as a soldier.

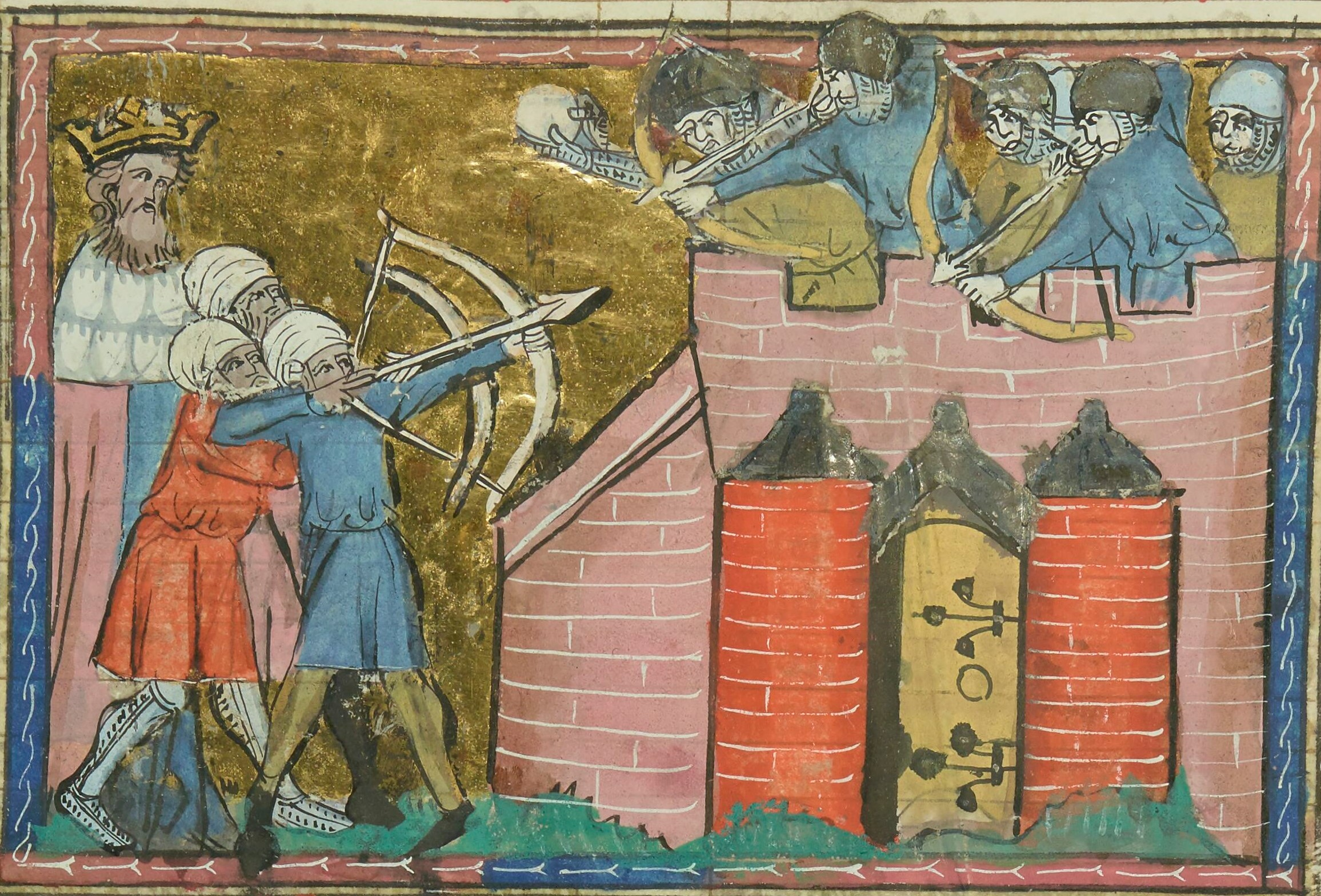
Kerbogha besieges Antioch in 1098. Miniature from 1337.

== Early life ==
Kerbogha was a Seljuk Turk who owed his success to his military talent. He supported Malik-Shah I's wife Terken Khatun and her four-year-old son Mahmud I who was installed on the throne at Baghdad. Kerbogha was sent with an army to secure Isfahan and to arrest Berkyaruq. However, Mahmud's supporters were defeated by Berkyaruq' forces at Isfahan in January 1093. A month later, he joined the Seljuk prince Ismail ibn Yaquti against Berkyaruq army which was victorious once more. Later on, Kerbogha joined Berkyaruq, then he was sent in 1094 to fight against Tutush I who declared himself Sultan in Syria, but he was imprisoned along with his brother Altuntaş in Aleppo then Homs. Upon the death of Tutush, he was released by Fakhr al-Mulk Radwan.

In 1095, he served under the Abbasid Caliph Al-Mustazhir in his attempted reconquest of Aleppo. In 1096, he managed to capture Harran, Nisbis and Mosul, in which he ended the Uqaylid Dynasty rule.

== The First Crusade ==
In 1098, when he heard that the Crusaders had besieged Antioch, he gathered his troops and marched to relieve the city. He departed from Mosul on 31 March. On his way, he attempted to regain Edessa following its recent conquest by Baldwin I, so as not to leave any Frankish garrisons behind him on his way to Antioch. For three weeks he pointlessly besieged the city before deciding to continue on to Antioch. By the time he arrived, around June 7, the Crusaders had already won the siege, and had held the city since 3 June. Kerbogha, in turn, began his siege.

During the siege, on 27 June, Peter the Hermit was sent as emissary to Kerbogha by the Crusaders to suggest that the parties settle all differences by a duel. Presumably feeling his position secure, Kerbogha did not see this course of action as being in his interest, and he declined.

Meanwhile, inside the city, Peter Bartholomew claimed to have discovered the Holy Lance through a vision. This discovery re-energized the Christian army. At the same time, disagreements and infighting broke out within the Atabeg's army. Kerbogha's mighty army was actually made up of semi-nomadic Turkmen, adding to regular armies and levies from Mosul, Jazira, Palestine, and Damascus, and the internal quarrels amongst the Emirs took precedence over any unity against the Franks. The only thing that united his allies was a common fear of Kerbogha's real goal, which was the conquest of all their lands. If Antioch fell to him, he would have been invincible.

On 28 June, when Bohemond, the leader of the Christian army, decided to attack, the Emirs decided to humble Kerbogha by abandoning him at the critical moment. Kerbogha was taken by surprise by the organization and discipline of the Christian army. This motivated, unified Christian army was in fact so large that Kerbogha's strategy of dividing his own forces was ineffective. He was quickly routed by the Crusaders. He was forced to retreat, and returned to Mosul.

== Later life ==
Despite his defeats outside the cities of both Edessa and Antioch, Kerbogha's position in Mosul went unchallenged through the rest of his life. He spent time raising Imad ad-Din Zengi, the namesake of the Zengid dynasty, who took power in Mosul in 1127 following the rule of a series of Seljuk vassals after Kerbogha's death in 1102.

== See also ==
- Baldwin and Arnold of Beauvais
- Baldwin I of Jerusalem
- First Crusade
- Siege of Antioch

Preceded by Ali ibn Muslim al-Uqayli	Emir of Mosul; 1096–1102	Succeeded by Sunqurjah

== Sources ==
- Bosworth, C. E. (1968). "The Political and Dynastic History of the Iranian World (A.D. 1000–1217)". In Frye, R. N. (ed.). The Cambridge History of Iran, Volume 5: The Saljuq and Mongol periods. Cambridge: Cambridge University Press. pp. 1–202. ISBN 0-521-06936-X.
- Bosworth, C. E. (1997). "Ebn Dārost, Tāj al-Molk Abu'l-Ḡanā'em Marzbān". Encyclopaedia Iranica, Vol. VIII, Fasc. 1. pp. 12–13.
- Thomas Brosset, "The First Crusade and the Failure of Kerbogha’s Campaign from Mosul to Antioch (March–June 1098): A Re-evaluation", Al-Masāq, 24 Avril 2024, p. 1-23. https://doi.org/10.1080/09503110.2024.2342205.
- Peacock, A. C. S. (2015). The Great Seljuk Empire. Edinburgh University Press. pp. 1–378. ISBN 9780748638260.
