= Melisende of Tripoli =

12th-century Frankish princess

Melisende of Tripoli (fl. c. 1161) was a princess from the Latin East who was betrothed to the Byzantine emperor Manuel I Komnenos. She was the daughter of Hodierna of Jerusalem and Count Raymond II of Tripoli. Her cousin King Baldwin III of Jerusalem suggested her as the bride to the emperor, who agreed. Preparations were made for the marriage, and the nobility of the Latin East considered Melisende the future Byzantine empress. After long delays, however, the emperor declared that he would not marry Melisende. This severely affected Byzantine relations with the Latin East.

== Childhood ==
Melisende was the younger of the two children of the count of Tripoli, Raymond II, and Hodierna of Jerusalem. Her older brother, Raymond III, was born in 1140. Melisende was named after her aunt Queen Melisende of Jerusalem, who was the older sister of Countess Hodierna.

The marriage of Hodierna and Raymond fell apart because of Raymond's jealousy. Rumours circulated that Hodierna had been unfaithful, and that Melisende was not Raymond's daughter. The couple separated in 1152, but Raymond was killed by the Assassins almost immediately after. Neither Melisende nor her brother, the new count, were old enough to assume rule, and thus their cousin King Baldwin III appointed their mother. Baldwin had the lords of Tripoli swear allegiance to Hodierna, Raymond, and Melisende.

== Betrothal ==
In late 1159 the Byzantine empress, Bertha of Sulzbach, died. The following year Emperor Manuel I Komnenos, requested that King Baldwin propose a new bride. Manuel suggested that he was most interested in the king's cousins Melisende of Tripoli and Maria of Antioch. Baldwin selected Melisende, to which the emperor agreed. The countess and the queen spent a year preparing Melisende's dowry, draining the royal treasury. The young count, for his part, had twelve galleys constructed to escort his sister to Constantinople as an empress. In July the next year Melisende arrived with her mother and brother in Nazareth. Historians Kevin J. Lewis and Jean Richard believe that the family came to discuss Melisende's imminent marriage with Baldwin. All three witnessed a grant by the king, in which Melisende is called "the future empress of the throne of Constantinople".

During the betrothal Melisende was carefully watched and examined by the emperor's agents. They made notes of her behavior and physical characteristics down to the most intimate details. After a year had passed since her betrothal, Melisende's family and friends began to worry about the delay of the marriage. Wedding guests were assembling to bid farewell to Melisende when news reached her brother that the Byzantine court had declared that the emperor would not marry Melisende after all. Her family was scandalized and humiliated, and Raymond refitted the ships that had been intended to escort Melisende and used them to raid Byzantine coasts and islands. It was soon revealed that the emperor had secretly chosen her cousin Maria of Antioch instead.

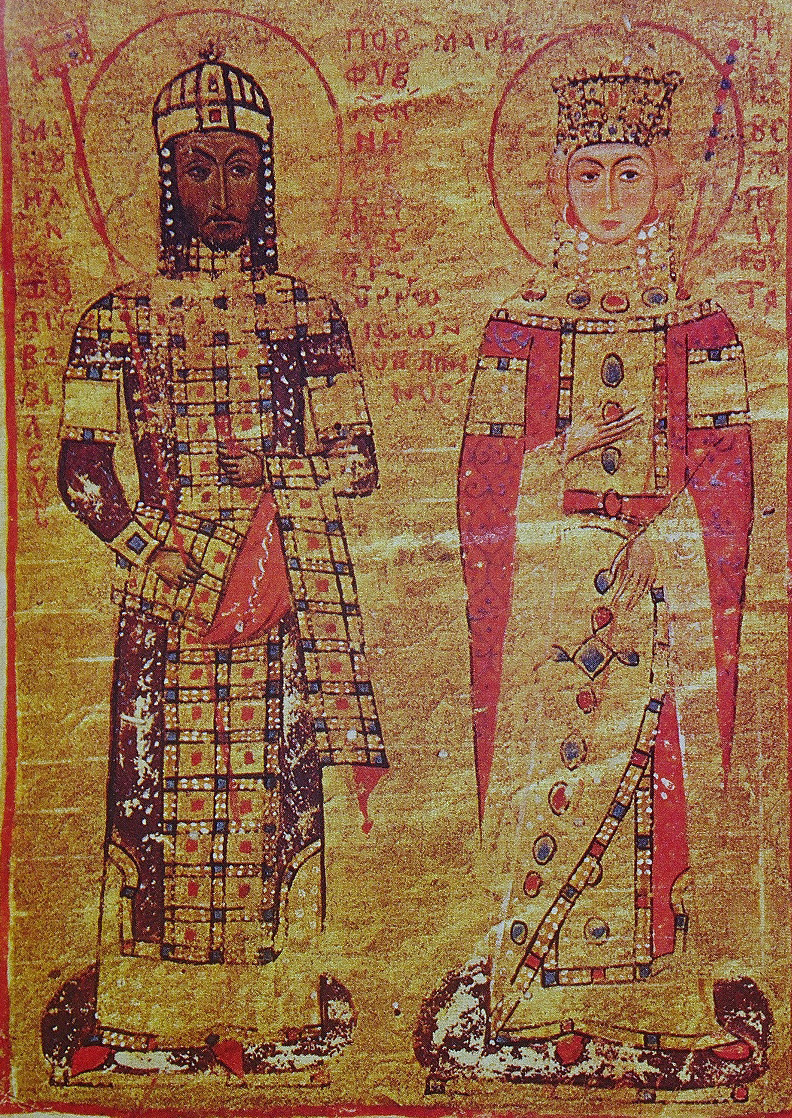
Emperor Manuel jilted Melisende for her cousin.

The chronicler John Kinnamos wrote that the imperial envoys had found Melisende to be beautiful, but that her health was visibly failing because of violent seizures. This may have been particularly concerning because the emperor's first wife had died unexpectedly. The envoys were also troubled by the rumors of Melisende's illegitimacy. The consensus of modern historians is that Manuel never intended to marry Melisende. Lewis notes that the Byzantine emperors had long desired to extend their rule over the Principality of Antioch, and that Manuel had no use for an alliance with Tripoli. According to Lewis's interpretation, the choice offered by Manuel to Baldwin was only a diplomatic nicety and Manuel was surprised when Baldwin, who was aware of the Byzantine strategical priorities, selected Melisende. Lewis agrees with the opinion of the historian Steven Runciman that Baldwin, who otherwise liked the Byzantines, chose Melisende specifically to prevent the growth of Byzantine influence in Antioch.

Lewis surmises that Raymond never forgave the insult on his and Melisende's honor, and that he may have undermined the future cooperation between the Byzantine Empire and the crusader states because of it. Melisende died young soon after her humiliation.

== Cultural references ==
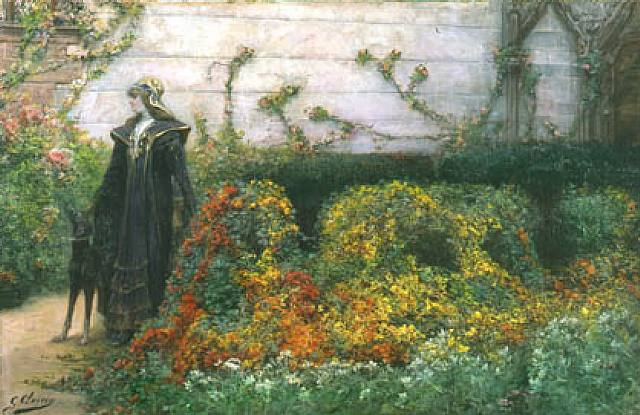
Sarah Bernhard as Mélissinde in La Princesse lointaine, painted by Georges Clairin

According to popular medieval tales, a troubadour named Jaufre Rudel fell in love with a countess of Tripoli without ever having seen her, and he sailed to Tripoli only to die in her arms. Rudel's vida never names the countess. In 19th-century popular culture Melisende was commonly identified as the princesse lointaine from these medieval tales. An example of this is the 1895 operetta La Princesse lointaine by Edmond Rostand, which incorporates Emperor Manuel's rejection of Melisende into the original story. Historian Steven Runciman also identifies Melisende as the princesse lointaine.

The vida of Rudel claims that the countess became a nun after Rudel's death, and Lewis believes that this is what led historians E.A. Babcock and A.C. Krey to conclude that Melisende became a nun. Lewis states that their conclusion is "unfounded and confused". According to him, the countess should be identified as Melisende's mother, Hodierna, because Melisende was too young in Rudel's lifetime and never bore the title of countess.

== Bibliography ==
- Lewis, Kevin James (2013). "Countess Hodierna of Tripoli: From Crusader Politician to "Princesse Lointaine"" (PDF). Assuming Gender. 3 (1). Cardiff University Press.
- Lewis, Kevin James (2017). The Counts of Tripoli and Lebanon in the Twelfth Century: Sons of Saint-Gilles. Routledge. ISBN 978-1-4724-5890-2.
- Runciman, Steven (1952). A History of the Crusades, Volume II: The Kingdom of Jerusalem and the Frankish East. Vol. 2. Cambridge: Cambridge University Press.
