= Countess of Tripoli =

== Countess of Tripoli ==
=== House of Rouergue, 1102–1187 ===
Picture	Name	Father	Birth	Marriage	Became Countess	Ceased to be Countess	Death	Spouse
	Elvira de Castile	Alfonso VI of León and Castile	before 1082	1094	1102; County established	28 February 1105 husband's death	after 1151	Raymond I
	Helie of Burgundy (?)	Odo I, Duke of Burgundy (Burgundy)	1080	June 1095	1109 husband's accession	21 April 1112 husband's death	28 February 1141	Bertrand
	Cecile of France	Philip I of France (Capet)	1097	1115		March 1137 husband's death	after 1145	Pons
	Hodierna of Rethel	Baldwin II of Jerusalem (Rethel)	1110	1131	March 1137 husband's accession	1152 husband's death	1164	Raymond II
	Eschiva of Bures	Godfrey of Bures	1118	1 October 1174	1152 husband's accession	September 1187 husband's death	1187?	Raymond III

=== House of Poitiers, 1187–1289 ===
Picture	Name	Father	Birth	Marriage	Became Countess	Ceased to be Countess	Death	Spouse
	Plaisance of Giblet	Hugh III Embriaco, Lord of Giblet (Embriaco)	-	before 21 August 1198		1217		Bohemond IV
	Melisende of Lusignan	Amalric II of Jerusalem (Lusignan)	after 1200/01	1/10 January 1218		March 1233 husband's death	after 1249	Bohemond IV
	Luciana di Segni	Paolo, Count of Segni	-	1235		January 1252 husband's death	-	Bohemond V
	Sibylla of Armenia	Hethum I of Armenia (Hethumids)	1240	June/October 1254		11 May/July 1275 husband's death	1290	Bohemond VI
	Margaret of Brienne	Louis of Acre (Brienne)	-	2 January 1278		19 October 1287 husband's death	9 April 1328	Bohemond VII

== Titular Countess of Tripoli ==
=== House of Lusignan ===
Picture	Name	Father	Birth	Marriage	Became Countess	Ceased to be Countess	Death	Spouse
	Eschive de Montfort	Honfroy de Montfort (Montfort)	1324	28 June 1342	1345? husband's accession	before 1350		Peter I
	Eleanor of Aragon	Infante Pedro, Count of Ribagorça and Prades (Barcelona)	1333	September 1353		1359 title passed to son	26 December 1416	Peter I
	Margaret of Lusignan	Peter I of Cyprus (Lusignan)	1360	1385, after May		16 August 1395/7 husband's death	1397	James
	Isabelle of Lusignan	James I of Cyprus (Lusignan)	-	29 February 1415		12 May 1422		Peter
	unnamed second wife	-	-	1 November 1439		6 August 1440		Peter

== See also ==
- List of Toulousain consorts
- Princess of Antioch
