= Raymond III of Tripoli =

Count of Tripoli from 1152 to 1187

Raymond III
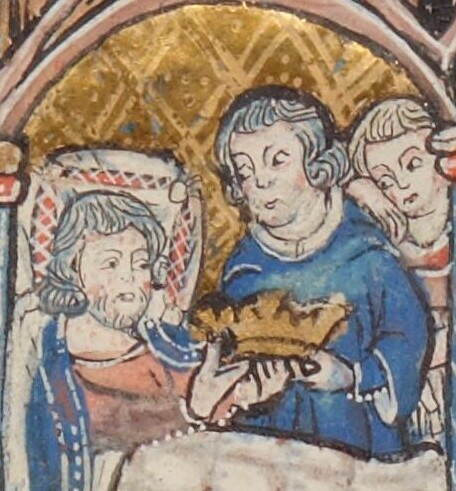
- Raymond is appointed regent for the underage Baldwin V of Jerusalem by the child's uncle King Baldwin IV

Count of Tripoli
- Reign: 1152–1187
- Predecessor: Raymond II
- Successor: Raymond IV
- Regents: See list: Hodierna of Jerusalem (1152–1155); Amalric of Jerusalem (1164–1174)
- Born: 1140
- Died: 1187 (aged 46–47); Tripoli (modern-day Lebanon)
- Spouse: Eschiva of Bures
- House: House of Toulouse
- Father: Raymond II, Count of Tripoli
- Mother: Hodierna of Jerusalem
- Religion: Catholicism

Raymond III (1140 – September/October 1187) was count of Tripoli from 1152 to 1187. He was one of the most influential political and military figures in the Crusader states of the 12th century. Leader of the faction of the local nobility established in the Holy Land, Raymond III advocated a policy of diplomatic coexistence and truces with Saladin's sultanate, in opposition to the belligerent stances of the newly arrived nobles from Europe. Although he advised against the Christian army's advance through the desert before the decisive Battle of Hattin, his advice was ignored, resulting in the destruction of the Crusader forces and the subsequent loss of Jerusalem.

He was a minor when Nizari Assassins murdered his father, Count Raymond II of Tripoli. His cousin, King Baldwin III of Jerusalem, who was staying in Tripoli, made Raymond's mother, Hodierna of Jerusalem, regent. Raymond spent the following years at the royal court in Jerusalem. He reached the age of majority in 1155, after which he participated in a series of military campaigns against Nur ad-Din, the Zengid ruler of Damascus. In 1161 he hired pirates to pillage the Byzantine coastline and islands to take vengeance on Byzantine emperor Manuel I Komnenos, who had refused to marry his sister Melisende. He was captured in the Battle of Harim by Nur ad-Din's troops on 10 August 1164, and imprisoned in Aleppo for almost ten years. During his captivity, his cousin King Amalric of Jerusalem administered the county of Tripoli on his behalf.

Raymond was released for a large ransom which he had to borrow from the Knights Hospitaller. He married Eschiva of Bures, making him prince of Galilee and one of the wealthiest noblemen in the Kingdom of Jerusalem. Amalric died in 1174, leaving a minor son, Baldwin IV, as his successor. As the child-king's closest male relative, Raymond was elected bailiff (or regent). Raymond remained neutral during the conflicts between Nur ad-Din's successors and his former commander, Saladin, which facilitated the unification of Egypt and a significant part of Syria under Saladin. When Baldwin reached the age of majority in 1176, Raymond's regency ended and he returned to Tripoli. Baldwin was ailing, and Raymond and Bohemond III of Antioch sought to diminish the influence of his mother, Agnes of Courtenay, and her brother, Joscelin III of Edessa, over the government. Before Easter 1180, they marched to Jerusalem, but their arrival had the opposite effect: Baldwin promptly arranged for his sister and heir Sibylla to be married to Guy of Lusignan, a supporter of the Courtenays, and Raymond had to leave the kingdom. In the following years, relations between Baldwin IV and Guy became tense, and the dying king disinherited his sister in favour of her son Baldwin V. On his deathbed In 1185, the king made Raymond bailiff for Baldwin V. Raymond's authority would be limited, because Joscelin III of Edessa was made the child's guardian, and all royal fortresses were placed into the custody of the military orders.

Baldwin V died suddenly in the summer of 1186, and Raymond convoked the barons of the realm to an assembly to Nablus. In his absence, Sibylla's supporters took possession of Jerusalem. Raymond tried to persuade Sybilla's half-sister, Isabella, and Isabella's husband, Humphrey IV of Toron, to claim the throne, but Humphrey swore fealty to Sybilla and Guy. Raymond refused to do homage to them and made an alliance with Saladin, allowing Saladin to cross Galilee during his campaigns against Jerusalem and to place a garrison in Galilee's capital Tiberias. In the summer of 1187, Saladin decided to launch a full-scale invasion against the crusaders, and only then was Raymond reconciled with Guy. Raymond commanded the vanguard of the crusaders' army in the Battle of Hattin, which ended with their catastrophic defeat. He was one of the few crusader commanders who were not killed or captured. He fled to Tyre and then to Tripoli, where he died (probably of pleurisy) after bequeathing Tripoli to his godson, Raymond of Antioch. The late 12th-century historian William of Tyre held Raymond III in high regard, and contemporaneous Muslim historians praised his intelligence. After the Battle of Hattin, Western historians tended to blame him for the crusaders' catastrophic defeat. In modern historiography, scholarly opinions are divided, with some historians accepting William of Tyre's assessment, and others emphasizing Raymond's selfishness and failures.

== Early life ==
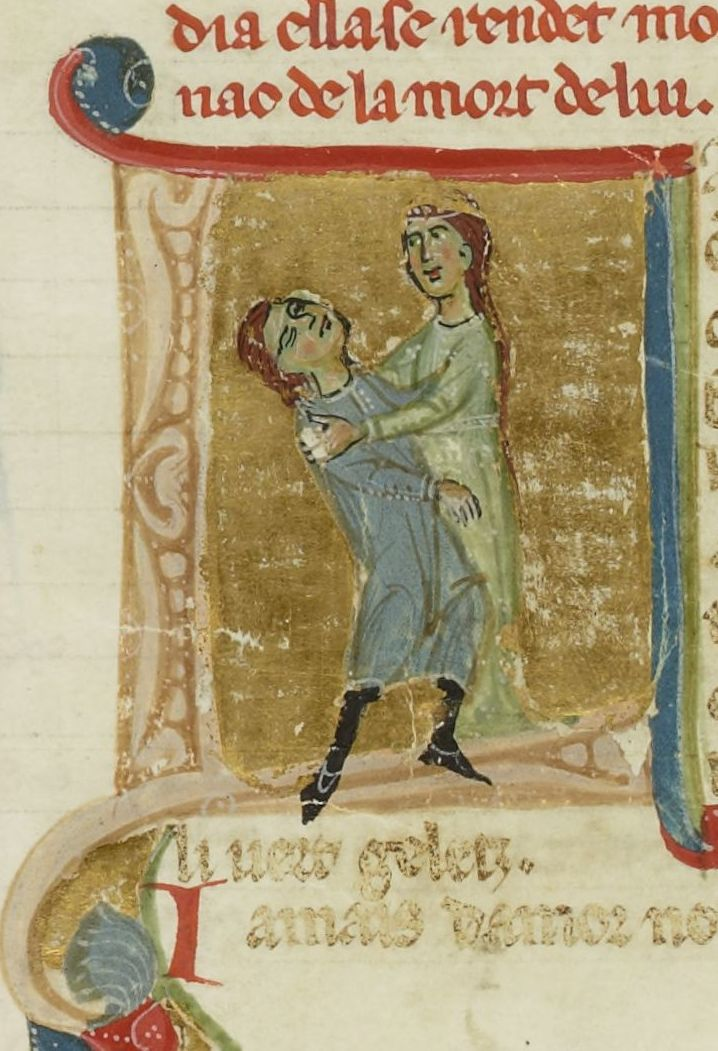
The troubadour Jaufre Rudel dying in the arms of Raymond's mother, Hodierna of Jerusalem (Note: According to Rudel's anonymous biography, completed around 1200, Rudel "fell in love with the countess of Tripoli without seeing her due to the very good and courteous things the he heard said about her by pilgrims" but he died of a sickness soon after they first met at Tripoli.)

Born in 1140, Raymond was the only son of Count Raymond II of Tripoli (r. 1137–1152) and Hodierna of Jerusalem. The Tripolitan dynasty originated in the County of Toulouse in southern France, but by the middle of the 12th century links between their Occitanian homeland and their county in the Levant had weakened. Raymond was still a child when he first witnessed a letter of grant of his father in 1151. The letter was also signed by his mother, an influential and active "political agent" of her age (as the historian Kevin J. Lewis characterises her), similar to her sisters, Queen Melisende of Jerusalem (r. 1131–1153) and Dowager Princess Alice of Antioch. Her husband's jealousy gave rise to scandalous matrimonial strife during the early 1150s. Although Queen Melisende came to Tripoli to mediate a reconciliation, Hodierna decided to leave for Jerusalem. Shortly after their departure, a band of Nizari Assassins murdered Raymond II at Tripoli's southern gate. Melisende's son King Baldwin III of Jerusalem (r. 1143–1163), who was staying in Tripoli, recalled the widowed Hodierna to the town.

== Count ==
=== Minority ===
Baldwin held an assembly after Raymond II's burial at which the nobles of the County of Tripoli paid homage to Hodierna and her two minor children, Raymond and Melisende. Raymond II had decreed that "the master of the county and the count's son"—an otherwise poorly documented official—was to administer Tripoli if an underage count succeeded to the throne. When appointing Hodierna to the regency for her son, Baldwin ignored the late count's instructions. The teenage Raymond spent several years at the royal court in Jerusalem. The first extant document that he witnessed in Jerusalem was issued on 23 September 1152 or 1153. Lewis proposes that Baldwin III probably supervised Raymond's knightly education.

=== First years of majority ===
Raymond reached the age of majority in 1155. In his first extant charter, issued on 11 June 1157, he confirmed his father's diploma about the grant of Tortosa (now Tartus in Syria) to the Knights Templar. Nur ad-Din, the Zengid ruler of Aleppo and Damascus (r. 1146–1174), ambushed Baldwin III at Jacob's Fort on the Jordan River eight days later. After Nur ad-Din laid siege to Baniyas, Baldwin III sent envoys to Tripoli and Antioch to seek assistance from Raymond and Raynald of Châtillon (r. 1153–1160). They hurried to Chastel Neuf (at present-day Margaliot in Israel) to join the decimated royal army. After their arrival, Nur ad-Din withdrew his troops without resistance.

An earthquake destroyed Tripoli, Arqa and Krak des Chevaliers in August 1157. Taking advantage of the arrival of Thierry, Count of Flanders (r. 1128–1168) at the head of a sizeable army in October, Baldwin III, Raynald of Châtillon and Raymond decided to launch a joint campaign against the Muslim towns of North Syria which had been ruined by the catastrophe. The crusaders first attacked Chastel Rouge near the border of the County of Tripoli, but they could not force the defenders to surrender. They could not seize Shaizar, either; Thierry of Flanders and Raynald of Châtillon claimed the town even before it was occupied, and they could not reach a compromise. The siege of Harenc (now Harem in Syria) was a success, but the crusading leaders finished the campaign after they captured it in January 1158.

Seeking a wife from the crusader states, the widowed Byzantine emperor Manuel I Komnenos (r. 1143–1180) sent envoys to Baldwin III in 1160. Manuel said that he was willing to marry Maria of Antioch or Raymond's sister, Melisende, who were both closely related to the King. Baldwin proposed Melisende, and the emperor acknowledged his choice. Twelve galleys were built at Raymond's order, because he wanted to have a magnificent retinue for his sister during her voyage to Constantinople. The emperor then changed his mind and began negotiations about his marriage to Maria with her mother, Constance of Antioch (r. 1130–1163). Feeling slighted for himself and his sister, Raymond crewed his newly built fleet with criminals and sent them to raid the Byzantine coasts and islands in August 1161. The pirates captured and plundered sacred places, and attacked pilgrims.

Nur ad-Din raided Krak des Chevaliers and laid siege to Harenc in the summer of 1164. Raymond marched out to join the crusaders (who were assembling to relieve the fortress), but they were defeated in the Battle of Harim on 10 August. Thousands of crusaders fell during the battle and Raymond, Bohemond III of Antioch (r. 1163–1201), Joscelin III of Edessa, Hugh VIII of Lusignan and other commanders were captured.

=== Captivity ===
The crusader states in 1165

The crusader leaders captured at Harim were taken to Aleppo, where they were imprisoned. The chronicler William of Tyre's contemporaneous report about Raymond's captivity is contradictory. He claimed that Raymond had spent his imprisonment "in beggary and iron", but he also emphasized that Raymond had learnt to read and acquired a high level of education in the prison. Modern historians assume, without positive evidence, that Raymond learnt Arabic during his captivity. Raymond, as William of Tyre continues, instructed his "loyal vassals" to acknowledge King Amalric of Jerusalem (r. 1163–1174), who had succeeded Baldwin III, as the lawful ruler of Tripoli for the duration of his captivity. Amalric hurried to Tripoli and took full responsibility for its government, assuming the title of "administrator of the county of Tripoli". He was able to persuade Nur ad-Din to release Bohemond III and Thoros II, Prince of Armenia (r. 1144–1169), because they were the Byzantine emperor's vassals; Raymond remained imprisoned.

Amalric was the crusader states' supreme ruler but his position was fragile. Bertrand de Blanchefort, Grand Master of the Knights Templar, reminded Louis VII of France (r. 1137–1180) in November 1164 that Amalric would be unable to defend the Frankish East alone. Nur ad-Din captured the fortress at al-Munaytira in 1165 (or 1166), and destroyed the Templars' castles at Halba, Araima and Safita in the summer of 1167. Lewis argues that Nur ad-Din captured Gibelacar during the latter campaign; the fortress was recaptured in late 1169 or early 1170.

The date and the circumstances of Raymond's release are uncertain. According to William of Tyre, Raymond was set free after spending eight solar years in captivity; the contemporaneous Muslim geographer Ibn Jubayr said that Raymond had been imprisoned for twelve lunar years. Another contemporaneous Arab Muslim scholar, Ali ibn al-Athir, incorrectly recorded that Raymond was released after Nur ad-Din died on 15 May 1174, but Raymond had witnessed a royal charter in Jerusalem on 18 April of that year. The historian Marshall Baldwin proposes that Raymond was set free in the fall of 1173 or early in 1174. Lewis writes that Raymond was released because of developing conflict between Nur ad-Din and his ambitious commander, Saladin who had taken over rule of Egypt. The ailing Nur ad-Din (or his advisers) most probably regarded the crusader states as a buffer between his Syrian realm and Saladin's Egypt.

William of Tyre reported that Raymond had to pay 80,000 pieces of gold as ransom, but could only pay 20,000. To guarantee payment of the arrears, Raymond surrendered hostages. Muslim authors wrote that Raymond's ransom amounted to 150,000 Syrian dinars. Raymond borrowed money from the Knights Hospitaller to pay at least part of his ransom.

== Count and regent ==
=== First regency ===
Walter of Saint Omer, Prince of Galilee, died in early 1174. King Amalric gave Walter's widow, Eschiva of Bures, in marriage to Raymond, enabling him to seize the large fief of Galilee in the Kingdom of Jerusalem. Their marriage was childless, but Raymond loved his wife and brought up her children by her first husband as if they were his own. King Amalric died on 11 July 1174. His only son, Baldwin IV, was crowned king four days later, although he was a minor and had lepromatous leprosy. The Jerusalemite seneschal Miles of Plancy took charge of the government, but was unable to persuade the commanders of the army to cooperate with him.

Taking advantage of the seneschal's unpopularity, Raymond came to Jerusalem in August and laid claim to the regency on the grounds that he was the closest male relative and the most powerful vassal of the child king. Raymond also emphasized that since he had appointed the King's father to administer Tripoli during his captivity, he was entitled to claim the same treatment. Miles of Plancy postponed the decision about Raymond's claim, saying that only the plenary session of the High Court of Jerusalem could hear it.

Raymond returned to Tripoli, and Miles of Plancy was murdered in Acre in October 1174. The most powerful noblemen and clergymen assembled in Jerusalem to decide on the administration of the kingdom, and the bishops unanimously supported Raymond's claim to regency. The constable Humphrey II of Toron, Reginald of Sidon, and the Ibelin brothers Baldwin and Balian also stood by him, but Raymond was elected bailiff (or regent) only after a two-day debate, most probably because other aristocrats distrusted him. Raymond was installed at the Church of the Holy Sepulchre, the traditional venue for royal coronations, in an extravagant ceremony. The King's mother Agnes of Courtenay had been Amalric's first wife but their marriage was annulled for consanguinity. Now Agnes was married to Reginald of Sidon, and Raymond allowed her to return to the royal court. He made the erudite William of Tyre chancellor, but left the office of seneschal vacant.

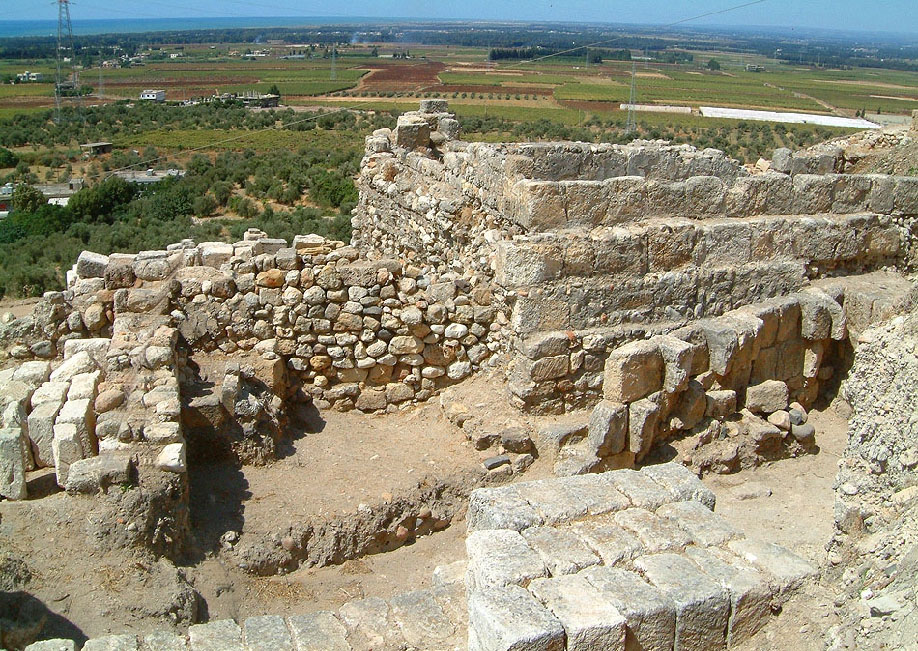
Ruins of the crusader castle at Arqa

Saladin had expanded his rule to Damascus, Baalbek, Shaizar and Hama, taking advantage of the minority of Nur ad-Din's son as-Salih Ismail al-Malik. Saladin occupied Homs in early December 1174, but the garrison at the citadel resisted. Without forcing the garrison to surrender, Saladin left Homs for Aleppo (the seat of the Zengids in Syria) and left a small army in Homs' lower town.

Saladin's fierce determination to unite Egypt and Syria threatened the crusader states. Raymond mustered the troops of Jerusalem and Tripoli at Arqa in early 1175, but did not intervene in the conflict between Saladin and the Zengids. The defenders of the Homs citadel offered to set their Christian prisoners free if Raymond provided military assistance for them; the prisoners included the hostages who were surety for the arrears of his ransom. Raymond was willing to assist the defenders of Homs only if they immediately released their prisoners, but they refused his demand. William of Tyre later emphasized that the commanders of the crusader army doubted if the defenders of the Homs citadel actually wanted to release their prisoners. Saladin returned to Homs soon after he was informed about the negotiations between the crusaders and the garrison. Instead of attacking him, the crusader army retreated to Krak des Chevaliers; this enabled Saladin to capture the citadel on 17 March 1175. He sent envoys to the crusaders' camp to secure their neutrality in his conflict with the Zengids. After Saladin agreed to release the hostages, the crusader army withdrew to Tripoli. William of Tyre blamed Humphrey II of Toron for the crusaders' inactivity during the siege of Homs.

Saladin defeated the united Zengid armies of Aleppo and Mosul in the Battle of the Horns of Hama on 13 April, and concluded a peace treaty with Aleppo which consolidated his rule in South Syria. After he allowed his Egyptian troops to return home, the crusader army was disbanded in early May. Raymond proposed a truce to Saladin, which was signed on 22 July. The truce enabled Saladin to march through Oultrejordain—the easternmost territory of the Kingdom of Jerusalem—during his new campaign against Ghazi II Saif ud-Din of Mosul (r. 1170–1180) in the summer of 1176.

=== Campaigns ===
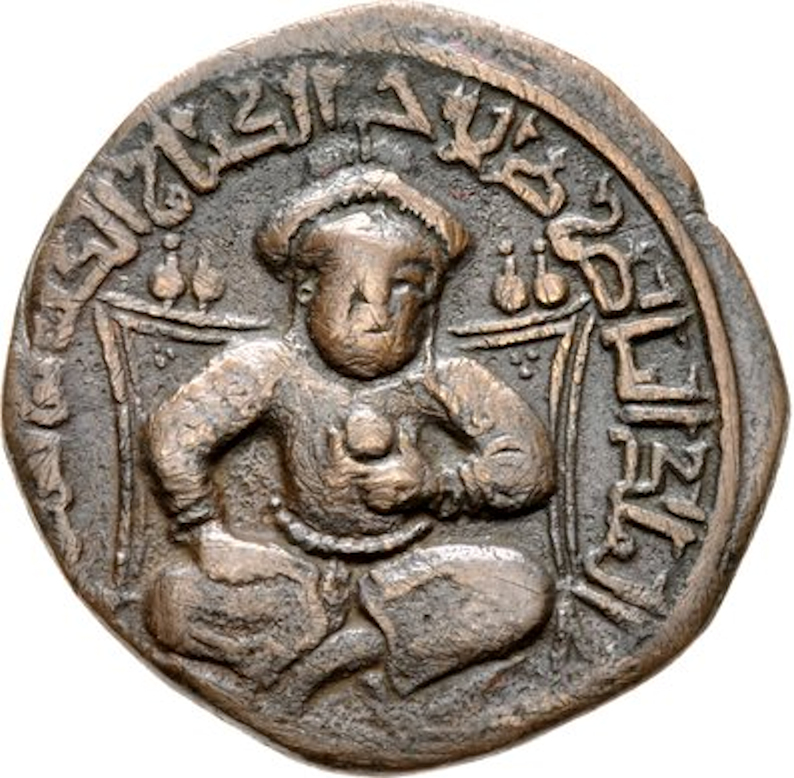
Copper fals minted in Saladin's name

Baldwin IV came of age at his fifteenth birthday on 15 July 1176. With the end of his regency, Raymond returned to Tripoli. Count Philip I of Flanders (r. 1168–1191) landed at Acre at the head of a large army of crusaders from Europe on 1 August 1177. The young king and his advisers made several efforts to persuade him to join a military campaign against Egypt, Saladin's principal power base, but Philip kept making excuses. According to rumours spreading among the crusaders, Raymond and Bohemond III convinced the count to resist because, as William of Tyre recorded it, they wanted to "entice him to their own lands, hoping with his help to undertake something which would benefit their states".

Philip came to Tripoli in late October. Roger de Moulins, Grand Master of the Knights Hospitallers, and more than 100 knights and 2,000 foot soldiers from the Kingdom of Jerusalem joined him in November. They attacked Hama, taking advantage of its governor's illness. The siege lasted only four days, because Bohemond persuaded them to join him in attacking Harenc. They laid siege to the fortress in early December, but could not capture it. Bohemond made peace with the Zengid ruler of Aleppo, as-Salih Ismail al-Malik (r. 1174–1181) in early 1177.

Raymond attacked a group of Turkmen and seized considerable booty from them in 1178 or 1179, but Saladin strengthened his border defence to prevent further raids. Saladin dispatched a group of horsemen to raid the Sidon region in early June 1179, and Baldwin mustered his troops to prevent their retreat. Raymond, who was staying at Tiberias, the capital of his Galilean principality, joined the royal army. They routed the raiders at a ford on the Litani River, but Saladin suddenly marched into Galilee and defeated the crusaders in the Battle of Marj Ayyun on 10 June. Although Raymond (who watched the battle from a hill) escaped to Tyre, his stepson Hugh of Saint Omer was captured.

According to the chronicle Estoire de Eracles (which contains many folkloristic elements), when the Flemish knight Gerard of Ridefort came to Tripoli, Raymond pledged the first wealthy heiress in his county in marriage to him. When William Dorel, Lord of Botrun (now Batroun in Lebanon) died—leaving a daughter as his heir—Raymond instead gave her to Plivain, a wealthy merchant from Pisa who had promised her weight in gold to him. Raymond's perfidy outraged Ridefort, who left Tripoli and settled in the Kingdom of Jerusalem in 1179.

=== Dynastic factions ===
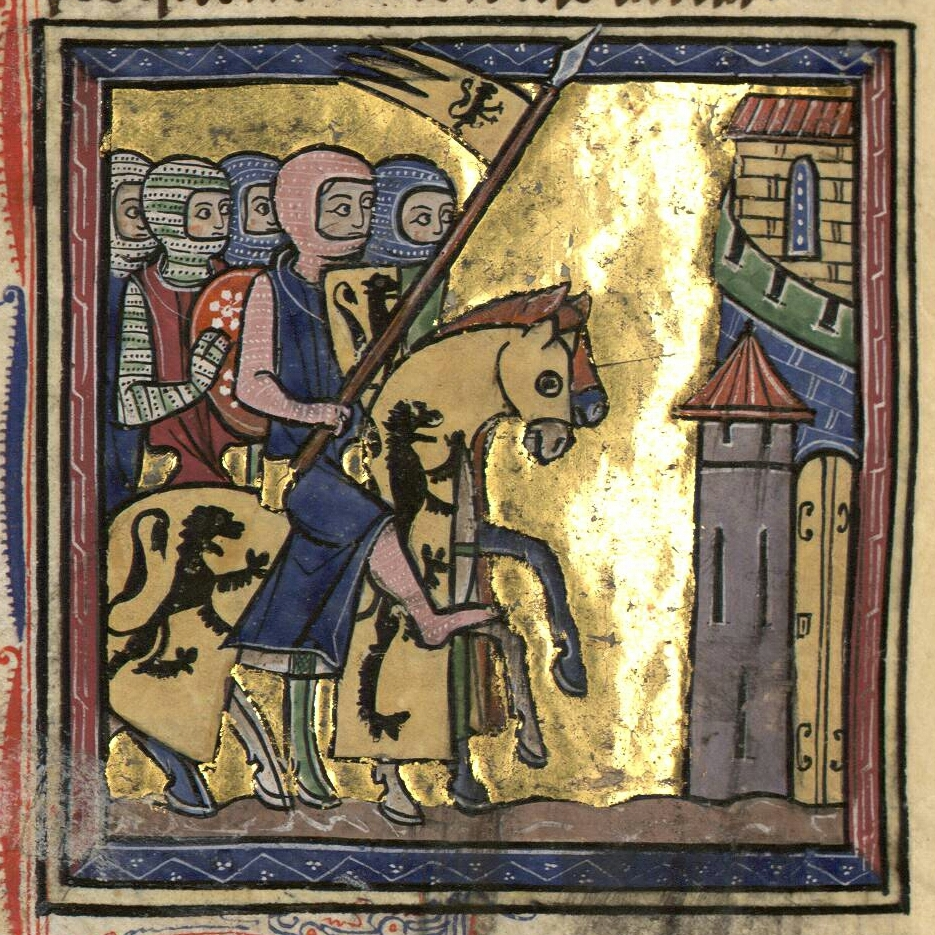
Raymond and Bohemond III of Antioch ride to Jerusalem in early 1180.

Raymond and Bohemond III mustered their troops and marched to Jerusalem in April 1180. Although they ostensibly came to celebrate Easter in the Holy City, the ailing Baldwin IV feared that they wanted to depose him. He hastily married his sister and heir presumptive, Sibylla, to Guy of Lusignan (a knight who had recently arrived from Poitou), although she had been promised to Duke Hugh III of Burgundy (r. 1162–1192). After studying the controversial reports of the events, the historian Bernard Hamilton concludes that Raymond and Bohemond staged a coup as they were concerned about the growing influence of the King's mother and her brother, Joscelin III of Edessa. According to Hamilton, Raymond and Bohemond wanted to forcibly persuade the King to marry Sibylla to Baldwin of Ibelin (a local candidate of their choosing) instead of Hugh, who was related to the Courtenays, and Sibylla's marriage to Guy destroyed their plan. Alternatively, the historians Steven Runciman and Baldwin write that Sybilla fell in love with Baldwin of Ibelin, but her mother, who disliked the Ibelins, decided to prevent the marriage. She sought the assistance of the seneschal Aimery of Lusignan, who introduced his brother Guy to Sybilla. She soon fell in love with the extraordinarily handsome youth, and convinced her brother to sanction their marriage. Baldwin adds that Raymond and Bohemond came to Jerusalem "presumably on hearing of the projected match" in an attempt to prevent it.

[T]he lord Prince Bohemond of Antioch and the lord Count Raymond of Tripoli, entering the kingdom with an army, terrified the lord king who feared lest they should attempt to organize a revolution by deposing the king and laying claim to the kingdom for themselves. For the king was afflicted more grievously than usual by his illness and day by day the symptoms of leprosy became more and more evident. The sister of the king ... was awaiting the arrival of [Hugh III of Burgundy] ... When the king knew that these noblemen had come, although both of them were his kinsmen, he viewed them with suspicion and hastened his sister's marriage. ... [B]ecause certain things had happened, she was unexpectedly married to a certain young man called Guy of Lusignan.

— William of Tyre: History of Deeds Done Beyond the Sea

Since Raymond and Bohemond lost the King's favour, they left Jerusalem shortly after Easter. They were crossing Galilee when Saladin invaded the region, and their arrival forced him to retreat. Saladin and Baldwin signed a two-year truce. The truce did not cover Tripoli, enabling Saladin to launch a sudden raid on the county. Since the surprise attack prevented Raymond from mustering his troops, he fled to the fortress of Arqa. Saladin's army pillaged the northern plains of the county, and his fleet captured the island of Ruad at Tortosa (now Arwad in Lebanon). He withdrew his troops only after Raymond signed a truce. Over the following years, Raymond strengthened the county's defence by granting new territories to the Knights Hospitaller or confirming his vassals' grants to them.

After a two-year absence, Raymond decided to again visit Galilee in April 1182 but Agnes of Courtenay and Joscelin III persuaded Baldwin IV to forbid his entrance to the Jerusalemite kingdom. Before long, certain "princes and greater men of the realm" (whom William of Tyre failed to identify) convinced the King to allow Raymond to come to Jerusalem. At the following general assembly, Raynald of Châtillon, Lord of Oultrejordain, proposed a military expedition across the Jordan River to prevent Saladin's march from Egypt to Syria in May 1182. Raymond opposed Châtillon's plan because it would have left the western lands of the kingdom undefended during the campaign, but Châtillon convinced most of the realm's barons to accept his proposal.

=== New conflicts ===
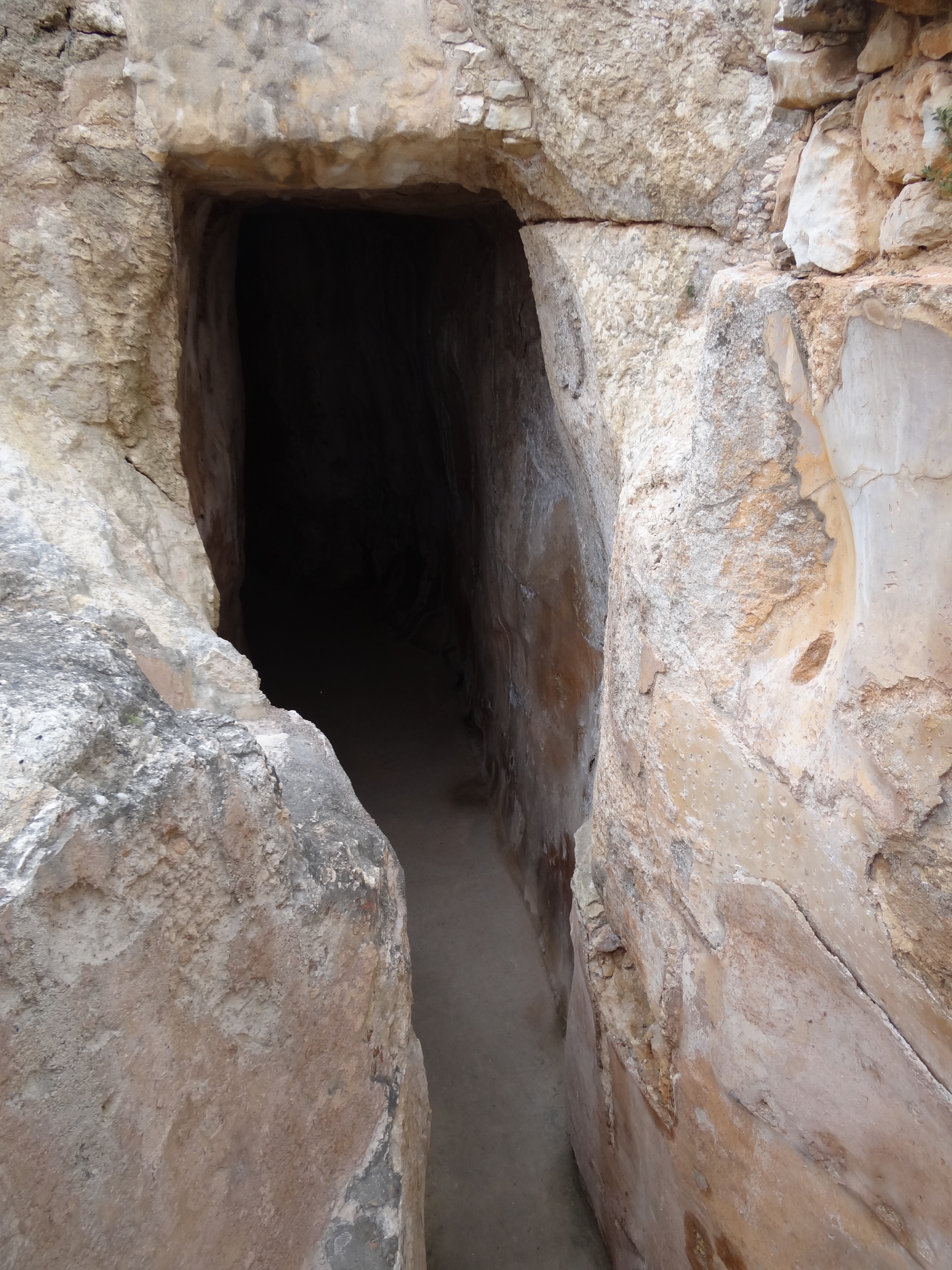
The ancient water system at Saffuriya. The royal troops customarily assembled at the springs.

Raymond accompanied the royal army to Oultrejordain. During his absence, troops from the nearby Muslim towns invaded Galilee and captured 500 women. The invaders seized a fortified cave near Tiberias, with the assistance of the native Christian garrison. The royal army returned to the kingdom's central territories, because Baldwin suspected that Saladin was planning further raids. Raymond went to Tiberias, where he fell seriously ill. When Saladin besieged the castle of Bethsain (now Beit She'an in Israel) on 13 July, Raymond dispatched his stepson Hugh to command the troops of Galilee and join the royal army assembling near Saffuriya. The royal army forced Saladin to withdraw his troops from the principality. Raymond made a plundering raid on the region of Bosra in late 1182. According to Hamilton, it was "a reconnaissance expedition" because Bosra was an excellent location to study the southward movements of the Damascus army.

Saladin seized Aleppo, the Zengids' last important stronghold in Syria, on 12 June 1183; he soon decided to invade the Kingdom of Jerusalem and bring the crusaders to a pitched battle. At Baldwin's order, more than 1,000 knights and about 15,000 foot soldiers gathered at Saffuriya. Raymond hurried to the mustering point. Baldwin developed a fever, which forced him to appoint Guy of Lusignan bailiff. Saladin crossed the Jordan and pillaged Bethsan on 29 September. Although he continued his campaign for nine days, the crusaders refrained from attacking his troops. William of Tyre reported that most common soldiers accused Guy's opponents of refusing to attack the invaders because they feared that a victory would strengthen Guy's position.

Relations between Guy and the King became tense during the following months. Baldwin summoned the realm's barons to an assembly to discuss the future of the kingdom's administration. Although the Latin patriarch of Jerusalem Heraclius, and the grand masters of the Templars and Hospitallers tried to intervene on Guy's behalf, Raymond, Bohemond, Reginald of Sidon and the Ibelin brothers easily persuaded him to dismiss his brother-in-law. They also convinced the King to make Guy's infant stepson, Baldwin of Montferrat, his heir, and the child was crowned on 20 November 1183. William of Tyre reported that it was "the general wish" that the King should appoint a regent, and most of the barons said that only Raymond "was suited to hold this office". The assembly was soon dissolved, because news about Saladin's sudden attack against Châtillon's Kerak Castle reached Jerusalem. The King mustered an army, but could not personally participate in the campaign for long and appointed Raymond to command the army before it crossed the Jordan. Learning about the arrival of the relief army, Saladin lifted the siege on 3 or 4 December.

=== Second regency ===
In October 1184, Guy of Lusignan raided the Bedouin tribes who grazed their herds in the royal domain of Deir al-Balah. This action enraged the King, who (according to William of Tyre) soon assembled the realm's barons and handed over "the government of the kingdom and its general administration" to Raymond. In contrast, Ernoul's chronicle and the Estoire de Eracles state that Baldwin IV decided to appoint a regent only after the members of the High Court had warned him that Guy (who was the stepfather of Baldwin's minor heir) was still entitled to govern the kingdom after his death. The dying king asked them to name their candidate, and they unanimously nominated Raymond. According to Ernoul's chronicle, Baldwin IV accepted their choice and asked Raymond "to act as regent of the kingdom and of the child for ten years until the child came of age". Although most sources failed to mention the date of these events, one version of the Estoire de Eracles states that Raymond was made regent in 1185.

Ernoul and the Estoire de Eracles recorded that the High Court passed specific rules about the regency before Raymond was installed: the barons chose Joscelin III as the child king's guardian, also stipulating that the military orders would hold all royal fortresses during the King's minority, but Beirut was granted to Raymond to compensate him for the expenses of state administration. The High Court also ruled that if the child king died before reaching the age of majority, the pope, the Holy Roman emperor and the kings of France and England would be approached to decide whether his mother Sybilla or her half-sister, Isabella, had the stronger claim to succeed him. Although some versions of the Estoire de Eracles hint that Raymond persuaded the High Court to pass these rules, most of them were clearly adopted to limit the regent's authority.

The date of Baldwin IV's death is unknown, but it is certain that he died before 16 May 1185. The King was still alive when Raymond sent envoys to Saladin to begin negotiating an armistice. Saladin granted a four-year truce, and a continuator of William of Tyre's chronicle wrote that "the land was free from external battles" during Raymond's second regency. Saladin agreed to make peace with the crusaders because Izz ad-Din Mas'ud, the Zengid ruler of Mosul (r. 1180–1193), had formed a coalition against him. Saladin made a series of attacks against Mosul, forcing Izz ad-Din to accept his suzerainty in March 1186. Raymond could not strengthen his authority during his regency; Joscelin III of Edessa, Patriarch Heraclius, and Peter, Archdeacon of Lydda (who had succeeded William of Tyre as chancellor) were Guy of Lusignan's supporters, and the Knights Templar elected his enemy Gerard of Ridefort as their grand master.

== Last years ==
=== Sibylla and Guy's accession ===
Baldwin V died unexpectedly in Acre during the summer of 1186. The cause of the child king's death is unknown. Joscelin III convinced Raymond to go to Tiberias to make preparations for a general assembly and let the Templars deliver the young king's body to Jerusalem. Taking advantage of Raymond's absence, Joscelin took control of Acre and Beirut. Raymond summoned the barons to Nablus, the fief of Balian of Ibelin (one of his main supporters). According to the contemporaneous German chronicler Arnold of Lübeck and Ibn al-Athir, Raymond tried to seize the throne at the assembly. The reports are clear evidence of a widespread belief in Raymond's ambitions to seize the crown, but their reliability is questionable according to Hamilton.

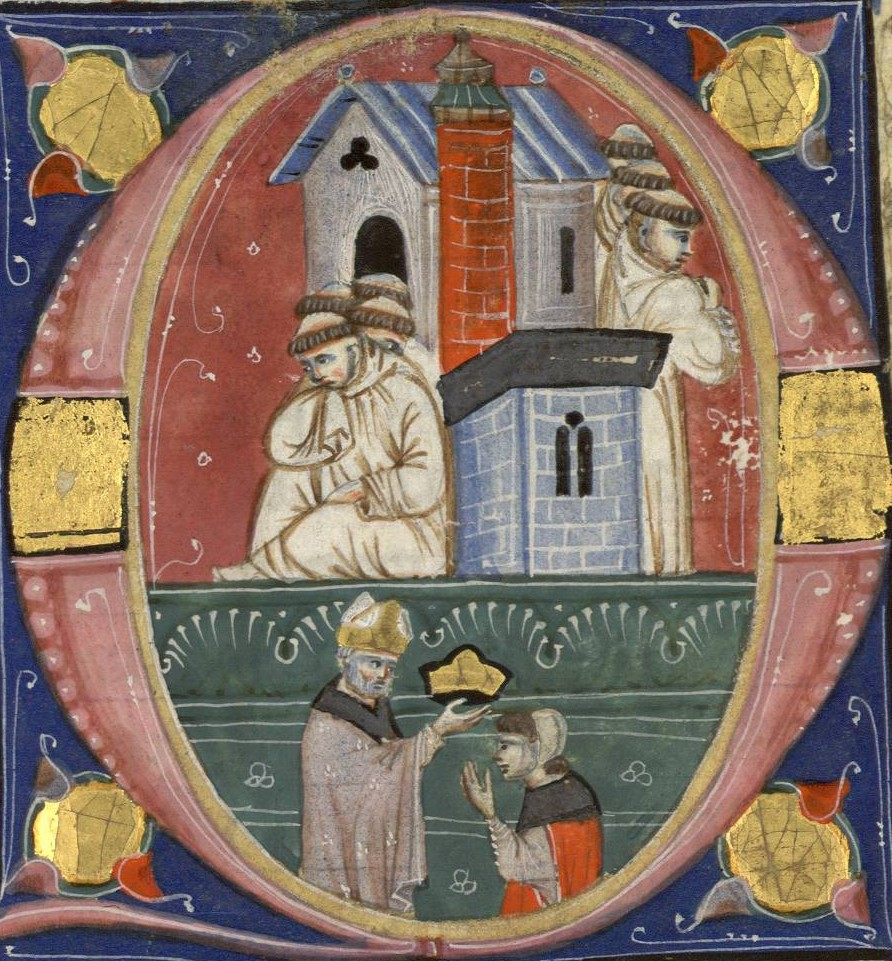
Sibylla crowned by Heraclius while monks sent from Nablus spy on them

While most of the barons were assembling at Nablus, Sibylla and Guy of Lusignan attended the King's funeral in Jerusalem. The patriarch of Jerusalem, the grand masters of the Templars and Hospitallers, and Raynald of Châtillon were also present. Staunch supporters of Sybilla, they decided to offer her the crown without waiting for the decision of the four Western monarchs (as the High Court had stipulated in early 1185). Although she invited the barons at Nablus to attend her coronation, they did not acknowledge her right to rule, forbade the ceremony, and sent two Cistercian abbots to Jerusalem to inform her of their veto. Raymond dispatched one of his retainers to accompany the abbots in disguise and to spy in the capital.

Sibylla's supporters ignored the barons' opposition, and Patriarch Heraclius crowned her before the end of September. She then put the crown on Guy's head, and the patriarch anointed him. According to the Estoire de Eracles, Ridefort proudly declared "this crown well worth the marriage of Botrun" in reference to Raymond's betrayal. Raymond and his supporters decided to elect Sibylla's half-sister Isabella and her husband, Humphrey IV of Toron, queen and king, but Humphrey—who was Châtillon's stepson—secretly left Nablus for Jerusalem and paid homage to Guy. Most barons followed Humphrey's example, swearing fealty to the royal couple before the end of October. After his former partisans abandoned him, Raymond returned to Tiberias without paying homage to Sibylla and Guy.

=== Towards Hattin ===
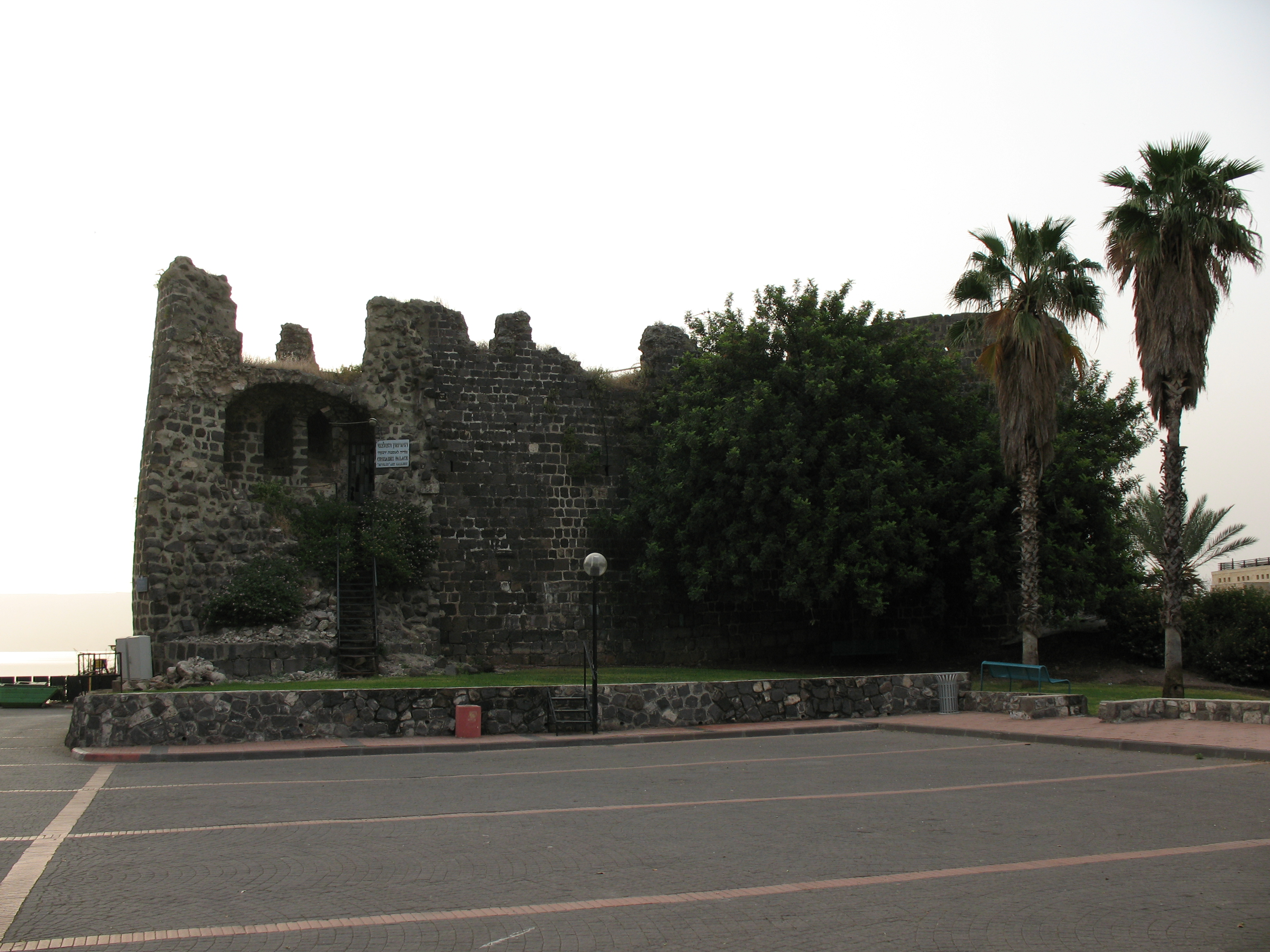
Ruins of the crusaders' castle in Tiberias

Guy accused Raymond of betrayal and invaded Galilee in October. The King demanded an accounting of Raymond's regency, but Raymond answered that he had spent all royal income on state administration. Raymond decided to resist and sought assistance from Saladin. The sultan sent troops to Tiberias, forcing Guy to withdraw. According to Ibn al-Athir, Saladin offered to make Raymond "an independent king for the Franks one and all". Arnold of Lübeck wrote that Raymond pledged to allow Saladin's army to invade the kingdom across Galilee in exchange for the sultan's assistance in seizing the throne.

Lewis suggests that the Occitanian troubadour Peire Vidal visited Raymond's court in Tiberias around the time of the conflict between Raymond and the royal couple. Raymond provided patronage to Vidal, who dedicated a eulogy to him in one of his poems. Lewis notes that it was around that time that Raymond offered to appoint a member of the House of Toulouse his heir if he was willing to settle in the County of Tripoli. Since Raymond's offer is only recorded in a version of a late source, the Lignages d'Outremer, it may have been invented by its author.

But upon Tripoli I rely
Because whereas the other barons
Chase away glory, he retains it
And does not let it depart from him

— Peire Vidal

Saladin decided to launch a full-scale invasion against the kingdom, and began mustering forces from his whole empire in early 1187. The barons convinced Guy to seek reconciliation with Raymond. The masters of the two military orders, Joscius, Archbishop of Tyre, Raynald of Sidon and Balian of Ibelin, were appointed to begin negotiations with Raymond in Tiberias. Saladin's son, al-Afdal, sent Muzaffar al-Din, lord of Harenc and Edessa, to raid the kingdom. In accordance with his treaty with Saladin, Raymond allowed the Syrian troops free entry into Galilee. After al-Afdal began raiding the Nazareth region, the masters of the military orders (Gerard of Ridefort and Roger des Moulins) attacked the invaders, although the enemy forces seriously outnumbered their retinue. The raiders almost annihilated the crusaders at the springs of Cresson on 1 May; only Ridefort and three knights escaped the battlefield. The Estoire de Eracles blamed Ridefort for the catastrophe, emphasizing that Raymond's envoys had warned him not to attack the large Syrian army. The invaders rode back to Syria across Galilee, displaying the severed heads of crusaders killed in battle on the points of their lances.

Balian of Ibelin and the archbishops of Tyre and Nazareth arrived at Tiberias the following day. Ernoul—who was present, as Ibelin's squire—wrote that the news of the crusaders' catastrophe came as a shock to Raymond, and he soon agreed to pay homage to Guy. He expelled the Muslim garrison which had been stationed in Tiberias since his alliance with Saladin. According to Ibn al-Athir, Raymond agreed to come to terms with the King only after his vassals threatened him with disobedience, and the prelates announced that they were ready to excommunicate him and annul his marriage. Raymond and the king met near Jerusalem, at Fort St Job, which was held by the Hospitallers. After they dismounted, Raymond knelt to the King in homage. According to Ernoul, Guy soon lifted him up and expressed regret for his irregular coronation.

=== Hattin and its consequences ===
The King ordered the assembly of the kingdom's troops at Saffuriya. Raymond joined the royal army with all the knights from Galilee, leaving his wife in Tiberias at the head of a small garrison. Knights from the County of Tripoli also came to Saffuriya. On 2 July 1187, Saladin invaded Galilee and besieged Tiberias. The news about the siege of Tiberias aroused fresh conflict among the crusaders, because Raymond and Ridefort proposed opposite strategies. Emphasizing that the town could resist even a prolonged siege, Raymond wanted to avoid a pitched battle and proposed that Guy send envoys to Antioch asking Bohemond III for reinforcements. Ridefort and Châtillon accused him of cowardice, adding that passivity would cost the King his kingdom. Since the King was obviously willing to accept Raymond's proposal, Ridefort reminded him of Raymond's previous alliance with Saladin. The King finally decided to attack, and ordered his army to march towards Tiberias.

As lord of the region, Raymond was appointed to guide the army across Galilee. After Saladin's troops began attacking the rear held by the Templars, the crusaders halted at Maskana although the local well could not provide enough water for a large army. Ernoul blamed Raymond for this decision, but the anonymous author of the chronicle known as the Libellus de expugnatione Terrae Sanctae per Saladinum—who also participated in the campaign—wrote that the King decided to stop against Raymond's advice. Saladin's troops encircled the crusaders' camp and killed all crusaders who left it in search of water. The army continued marching towards Tiberias the following day, with Raymond commanding the vanguard and Saladin's troops attacking them. A group of thirsty foot soldiers which tried to break through enemy lines towards the distant Sea of Galilee was massacred, and five of Raymond's knights defected to Saladin's side. Raymond led a cavalry charge against the right wing of Saladin's army in an attempt to reach the springs near Hattin, forcing the Muslim troops to open a pass without resistance. Instead of turning back, Raymond and the crusaders who had accompanied him (including Reynald of Sidon, Balian of Ibelin and Joscelin III of Edessa) hurried to Safed and then to Tyre.

The rest of the crusader army was annihilated; Raymond's many Tripolitan vassals—Plivain of Botrun, Hugh II Embriaco and Melioret of Maraqiyya—were captured. The towns of the kingdom, left nearly defenseless, could not resist, and Saladin captured almost all of them over the following month. Eschiva of Bures surrendered Tiberias to Saladin and joined Raymond in Tyre. After Saladin occupied Beirut on 6 August, Raymond fled to Tripoli because he thought that Saladin could easily capture Tyre. His old allies, Balian of Ibelin and Raynald of Sidon, soon joined him.

Raymond fell seriously ill in Tripoli. The contemporaneous chronicler Baha ad-Din ibn Shaddad recorded that he had pleurisy. Other sources—Ernoul, the Estoire de Eracles and Abu'l-Fida—emphasized that Raymond's sorrow for the crusaders' catastrophic defeat at Hattin caused his illness. The childless Raymond willed the County of Tripoli to the eldest son of Bohemond III of Antioch, Raymond, who was his godson. Although the contemporaneous Ralph of Diceto recorded that Raymond died fifteen days after the fall of Jerusalem, on 17 October 1187, Lewis proposes that Raymond probably died in September.

== Legacy ==
William of Tyre, who held Raymond in high regard, described him as a man with "much foresight" in politics and warfare. His praise was tempered with criticism, and he called Raymond's 1179 escape from the battlefield at Marj Ayyun "disgraceful". Although William (who was made chancellor and archbishop during Raymond's first regency) cannot be regarded as a neutral observer, his chronicle strongly influenced the works of Runciman, Baldwin and other 20th-century historians. According to Baldwin, William's account of Raymond's political and military talents should be regarded "more a statement of fact than an expression of opinion". Lewis refutes Raymond's positive assessment, saying that his "career reads as a veritable litany of inconsequential, misguided, or downright disastrous endeavours". Barber emphasizes that Raymond's "actions were usually driven by his own personal ambitions and needs".

[Raymond] was a slight-built, thin man. He was not very tall and he had a dark skin. He had straight hair of a medium colour and piercing eyes. He carried himself stiffly. He had an orderly mind, was cautious, but acted with vigour. He was more than averagely abstemious in his eating and drinking habits, and although he was liberal to strangers he was not so affable towards his own men.

— William of Tyre: History of Deeds Done Beyond the Sea

Contemporary Muslim authors described Raymond as an intelligent, astute politician. Ibn al-Athir wrote that the crusaders "had nobody more influential than him, none braver and none more excellent in counsel". Ibn al-Athir emphasized Raymond's bad reputation among the Muslims, saying that Raymond was "the devil among the Franks and the most unyieldingly hostile to the Muslims". The 13th-century Arab historian Abu Shama records that some Muslims also regarded Raymond as one of the principal enemies of the Muslim world, and urged Saladin to capture (and kill) him and Raynald of Châtillon.

Baldwin, Runciman and other historians, who based their works primarily on the chronicles of William of Tyre and Ernoul, regard Raymond as a leader of the pullani (natives) who wanted to keep peace with Saladin because they wanted to ensure the survival of the crusader states. These scholars see Raymond's opponents as newcomers whose aggressive policy led to the fall of the kingdom. They accept the positive picture of Saladin in his official biographies, which describe him as a trustworthy man who never broke his word. Andrew Ehrenkreutz was the first historian to conclude that Saladin's biographies should be treated critically, due to their similarity to hagiographies of canonized European monarchs. Accepting this critical approach, Hamilton doubts Saladin's willingness to "live at peace with his Christian neighbors" and allow them to keep Jerusalem (one of Islam's holiest cities).

The fall of Jerusalem and nearly the entire Holy Land after the Battle of Hattin was a terrible blow to the Christian world. Raymond's alliance with Saladin and his escape from the battlefield aroused suspicion, and many Christian writers regarded him a traitor. About 60 years after the events, the chronicler Alberic of Trois-Fontaines said that Raymond and Saladin solidified their alliance by drinking each other's blood. The Minstrel of Reims believed that Saladin reminded Raymond of his oath of alliance to persuade him to leave the battlefield at the Horns of Hattin. Robert of Auxerre, William of Nangis and other medieval European historians accused Raymond of apostasy, saying that he had been circumcised shortly before God killed him for his betrayal. Muslim historians also knew that the Christians thought that Raymond had converted (or, at least, wanted to convert) to Islam. The contemporaneous Muslim historian Imad ad-Din al-Isfahani wrote that Raymond did not convert only because he was afraid of his co-religionists. Modern historians agree that the stories of Raymond's conversion were invented.

== Genealogical table ==
Raymond's close family and relationship with neighbouring rulers

Pons II of Toulouse	Almodis of La Marche
William IV of Toulouse	Raymond IV of Toulouse
Philippa of Toulouse	Bertrand of Tripoli
Baldwin II of Jerusalem	Morphia of Melitene	Pons of Tripoli	Cecilia of France
Melisende of Jerusalem	Alice of Jerusalem	Hodierna of Jerusalem	Raymond II of Tripoli	Agnes of Tripoli
Baldwin III of Jerusalem	Amalric of Jerusalem	Constance of Antioch	Raymond of Poitiers	Melisende of Tripoli	Raymond III of Tripoli	Eschiva of Bures	Walter of Saint Omer
Baldwin IV of Jerusalem	Sibylla of Jerusalem	Isabella I of Jerusalem	Bohemond III of Antioch	Hugh II of Saint Omer	William of Saint Omer	Ralph of Saint Omer
Baldwin V of Jerusalem	Raymond IV of Tripoli	Bohemond IV of Antioch

== See also ==
- Kingdom of Heaven (film)

== Sources ==
=== Primary sources ===
- The Chronicle of Ibn Al-Athīr for the Crusading Period from Al-Kāmil Fī'l-ta'rīkh, Part 2: The years 541–589/1146–1193: The Age of Nur al-Din and Saladin (Translated by D.S. Richards) (2007). Ashgate. ISBN 978-0-7546-4078-3.

=== Secondary sources ===
- Baldwin, Marshall W. (1969) [1955]. "The Latin States under Baldwin III and Amalric I, 1143–1174; The Decline and Fall of Jerusalem, 1174–1189". In Baldwin, Marshall W. (ed.). The First Hundred Years. A History of the Crusades. Vol. I. The University of Wisconsin Press. pp. 528–561, 590–621. ISBN 978-0-299-04834-1.
- Barber, Malcolm (2012). The Crusader States. Yale University Press. ISBN 978-0-300-11312-9.
- Hamilton, Bernard (2000). The Leper King and His Heirs: Baldwin IV and the Crusader Kingdom of Jerusalem. Cambridge University Press. ISBN 978-0-521-64187-6.
- Lewis, Kevin James (2017). The Counts of Tripoli and Lebanon in the Twelfth Century: Sons of Saint-Gilles. Rulers of the Latin East. Routledge. ISBN 978-1-4724-5890-2.
- Lilie, Ralph-Johannes (2004) [1993]. Byzantium and the Crusader States 1096–1204. Oxford University Press. ISBN 978-0-19-820407-7.
- Lock, Peter (2006). The Routledge Companion to the Crusades. Routledge. ISBN 978-0-415-39312-6.
- Riley-Smith, Jonathan (1973). The Feudal Nobility and the Kingdom of Jerusalem, 1174–1277. Macmillan. ISBN 978-0-333-06379-8.
- Runciman, Steven (1989) [1951]. The Kingdom of Jerusalem and the Frankish East, 1100–1187. A History of the Crusades. Vol. II. Cambridge University Press. ISBN 978-0-521-06163-6.

Raymond III of Tripoli House of Toulouse Born: 1140 Died: 1187
Regnal titles
Preceded by Raymond II	Count of Tripoli; 1152–1187	Succeeded by Raymond IV
Preceded by Walter of Saint Omer	Prince of Galilee; 1174–1187	Vacant Saladin's conquest Title next held by Hugh II of Saint Omer as titular prince
