= Maria of Antioch =

Byzantine empress from 1161 to 1180

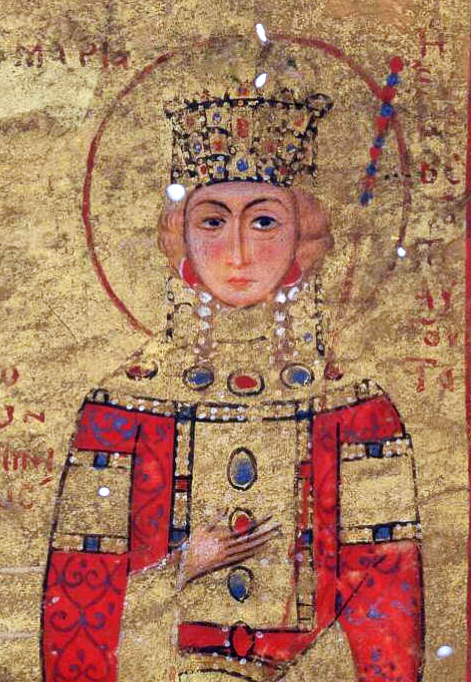
- Manuscript miniature of Empress Maria (Vatican Library)

Byzantine Empress consort
- Tenure: 24 December 1161 - 24 September 1180
- Born: 1145; Antioch (now Antakya, Hatay, Turkey)
- Died: 1182 (aged 36–37)
- Spouse: Manuel I Komnenos
- Issue: Alexios II Komnenos
- House: House of Poitiers
- Father: Raymond of Poitiers
- Mother: Constance of Antioch

Maria of Antioch (Greek: Μαρία; 1145–1182) was a Byzantine empress by marriage to Byzantine Emperor Manuel I Komnenos, and regent during the minority of her son porphyrogennetos Alexios II Komnenos from 1180 until 1182.

== Early life ==
Maria of Antioch was the daughter of Constance of Antioch and her first husband Raymond of Poitiers. In 1160, Maria's stepfather Raynald of Châtillon was taken prisoner by Maj al-Dīn, the ruler of Aleppo and an ally of Nūr al-Dīn. Her mother claimed the Principality of Antioch for herself, but the nobles supported her son, Maria's brother Bohemund III. King Baldwin III of Jerusalem set Bohemund III up as prince and appointed as regent the rich and worldly Aimery of Limoges, Latin Patriarch of Antioch and an old opponent of Raynald. Constance protested this decision in Constantinople at the court of the Byzantine emperor Manuel I Komnenos. Manuel had been the nominal overlord of Antioch since Raynald's submission in 1158, and his subsequent capture presented an opportunity for the emperor to claim the Principality and for the Principality to gain protection by the empire.

== Byzantine empress ==
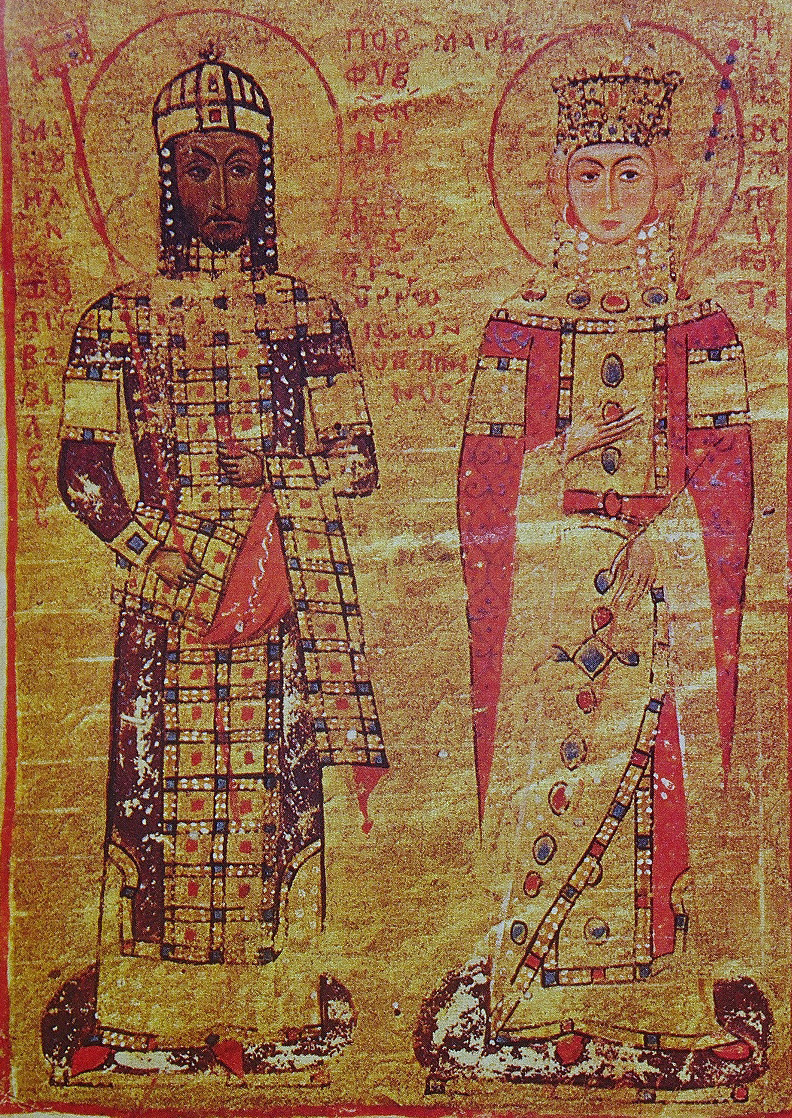
Manuscript miniature of Maria of Antioch with Manuel I Komnenos, Vatican Library, Rome

In mid-1160, Manuel's wife Empress Irene (originally named Bertha of Sulzbach) had died, and Manuel wanted to marry a princess from one of the Crusader states. John Kontostephanos, the chief dragoman (interpreter) Theophylact, and the akolouthos of the Varangian Guard Basil Kamateros were sent to Jerusalem to seek a new wife, and the two princesses Maria of Antioch and Melisende of Tripoli, a daughter of Count Raymond II of Tripoli by Hodierna of Jerusalem, were offered as candidates. Both were renowned for their beauty, but according to John Kinnamos Maria was the more beautiful of the two; the tall, blonde-haired princess clearly showed her Norman ancestry. King Baldwin III suggested Melisende, and her brother Count Raymond III of Tripoli set about gathering an enormous dowry, with gifts from Hodierna and from Melisende's namesake, her aunt Queen Melisende. The ambassadors were not satisfied and delayed the marriage for over a year; they had apparently heard rumours concerning Hodierna's infidelity and therefore Melisende's possible legitimacy. Instead, Manuel chose Maria. Count Raymond was insulted and in retaliation attacked Byzantine Cyprus.

Meanwhile, an imperial embassy led by Alexios Bryennios Komnenos and the prefect of Constantinople, John Kamateros, came to Antioch to negotiate the marriage. Maria embarked from the port of St. Simeon for Constantinople in September, and the marriage took place in Hagia Sophia on December 24. Whether this took place in 1161 or 1162 is unclear. Three patriarchs performed the marriage: Luke Chrysoberges, Patriarch of Constantinople; Sophronios, Greek Patriarch of Alexandria, and Athanasius I Manasses, Greek Patriarch of Antioch. The marriage was celebrated with feasts, gifts to the church, and chariot races in the Hippodrome for the people. This strengthened the connection of Antioch to the Byzantine Empire. The marriage also strengthened the position of Maria's mother Constance, who now held the regency of Antioch. According to Niketas Choniates, Maria

"...was like unto the laughter-loving, golden Aphrodite, the white-armed and ox-eyed Hera, the long-necked and beautiful ankled Laconian, whom the ancients deified for their beauty, and all the rest of the beauties whose good looks have been preserved in distinguished books and histories."

For several years, Maria was childless. In 1166 she miscarried a son, considered a tragedy by her husband and the population. In 1169 Maria finally gave birth to a son, the future emperor Alexios II Komnenos. She played a role in the political and diplomatic life of Constantinople. French being her mother tongue, she was able to observe the double-dealing of the hypoboleus (court interpreter) Aaron Isaakios, who was quietly advising Westerners not to pay too much for the Emperor's favour. As a result, Manuel had Aaron blinded.

== Final years ==
=== Regency ===
After the death of Manuel in 1180, Maria officially became a nun with the name "Xenē" (Greek: Ξένη), but in reality she acted as regent for their son Alexios II. Despite being a nun she had many ambitious suitors, but she chose another Alexios, the prōtosebastos and prōtovestiarios, a nephew of Manuel and uncle of Maria Komnene, former queen of Jerusalem, as an advisor and lover, causing a scandal among the Greek population. As a Westerner who favoured the Italian merchants, Maria was opposed by the Greeks, and her regency was widely considered incompetent.

The leaders of the opposition were her stepdaughter, the porphyrogenita Maria Komnene and her husband, the Caesar Renier of Montferrat, though himself a fellow Latin. The porphyrogenita Maria may have considered herself the rightful heir, as the elder child of Manuel; she was almost as old as her stepmother Maria. Maria and Renier gained the support of the Patriarch Theodosius I and used Hagia Sophia as a base of operations. Alexios had the patriarch arrested, leading to open warfare on the streets of Constantinople.

=== Execution ===
Manuel's cousin Andronikos Komnenos, who had been exiled during Manuel's reign, was invited back by the porphyrogenita Maria, and marched on Constantinople in 1182. He provoked the citizens into a massacre of the Latin inhabitants, mostly Venetian and Genoese merchants.

After gaining control of the city, he had the Porphyrogenita and Renier poisoned, and then had Empress Maria arrested and imprisoned in the monastery of St. Diomedes or in a prison nearby. The empress tried to seek help from her brother-in-law King Béla III of Hungary, to no avail. Andronikos had Alexios II sign the order for his mother's execution, and appointed his own son Manuel and the sebastos George to execute her, but they refused. Instead, according to Niketas, Maria was strangled by the hetaireiarches Constantine Tripsychos and the eunuch Pterygeonites, and buried in an unmarked grave on a nearby beach.

Presumably owing to the secrecy surrounding her death, alternative versions of her death circulated, such as that she was tied up in a sack and drowned. Andronikos had himself crowned co-emperor, but Alexios II was soon murdered as well, and Andronikos took full control of the empire. Sometime later Andronikos also defaced or destroyed most images of Maria in Constantinople.

== Bibliography ==
- Buck, Andrew (2015). "Between Byzantium and Jerusalem? The principality of Antioch, Renaud of Châtillon, and the penance of Mamistra in 1158". Mediterranean Historical Review. 30 (2): 107–124. doi:10.1080/09518967.2015.1117203.
- Lynda Garland, Byzantine Empresses: Woman and Power in Byzantium, AD 527-1204. Routledge, 1999.
- McMahon, Lucas (2025). "Manuel I Komnenos' policy towards the Sultanate of Rum and John Kontostephanos' embassies to Jerusalem, 1159–61". Crusades. 24 (1): 47–66. doi:10.1080/14765276.2024.2405810.
- Steven Runciman, A History of the Crusades, Vol. II: The Kingdom of Jerusalem. Cambridge University Press, 1952.
- Warren Treadgold, A History of the Byzantine State and Society. Stanford University Press, 1997.
- O City of Byzantium, Annals of Niketas Choniatēs, trans. Harry J. Magoulias. Wayne State University Press, 1984.
- John Cinnamus, Deeds of John and Manuel Comnenus, trans. Charles M. Brand. Columbia University Press, 1976.
- William of Tyre, A History of Deeds Done Beyond the Sea, trans. E. A. Babcock and A. C. Krey. Columbia University Press, 1943.

Maria of Antioch Ramnulfids Born: 1145 Died: 1182
Royal titles
Preceded by Bertha of Sulzbach	Byzantine Empress consort 1161–1180	Succeeded by Agnes of France
