= Areimeh Castle =

Historic castle in Syria

- قلعة العريمة (Arabic)
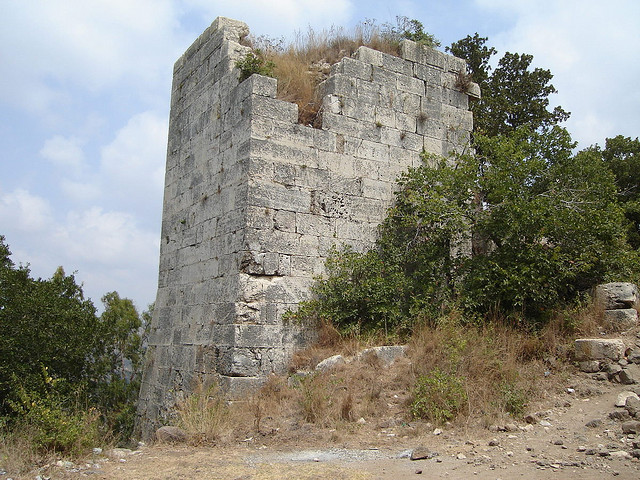

- Location within Syria
- Location: Safita, Syria

Areimeh Castle (Arabic: قلعة العريمة) is located on a rocky plateau about 25 kilometers southeast of Tartus, near the Safita area on the Syrian coast.

== Geography ==
The castle rises about 178 meters above sea level and overlooks the Akkar Plain.

== History ==
The region had an important strategic role, due to its proximity to the Homs Gap, Mount Lebanon, Syrian Coastal Mountain Range and Beqaa Valley. Hence, a Crusader castle was built there, on Byzantine ruins during the 12th century. It was controlled by Raymond II, Count of Tripoli, then by Bertrand of Toulouse, Alphonse Jourdain's illegitimate son, in 1149, but Raymond recaptured it with the assistance of Muslim ruler, Nur ad-Din Zengi, and Bertrand was imprisoned for twelve years. Later on, Raymond ceded the castle to the Knights Templar in the early 1150s. It was taken temporarily by Nur ad-Din Zengi by 1167, damaged in the 1170 earthquake, sacked again by Nur ad-Din in 1171, then recaptured by the Knights Templar in 1177, it was temporarily taken by Saladin in 1187, and finally lost to Muslims in 1291.

== Description ==
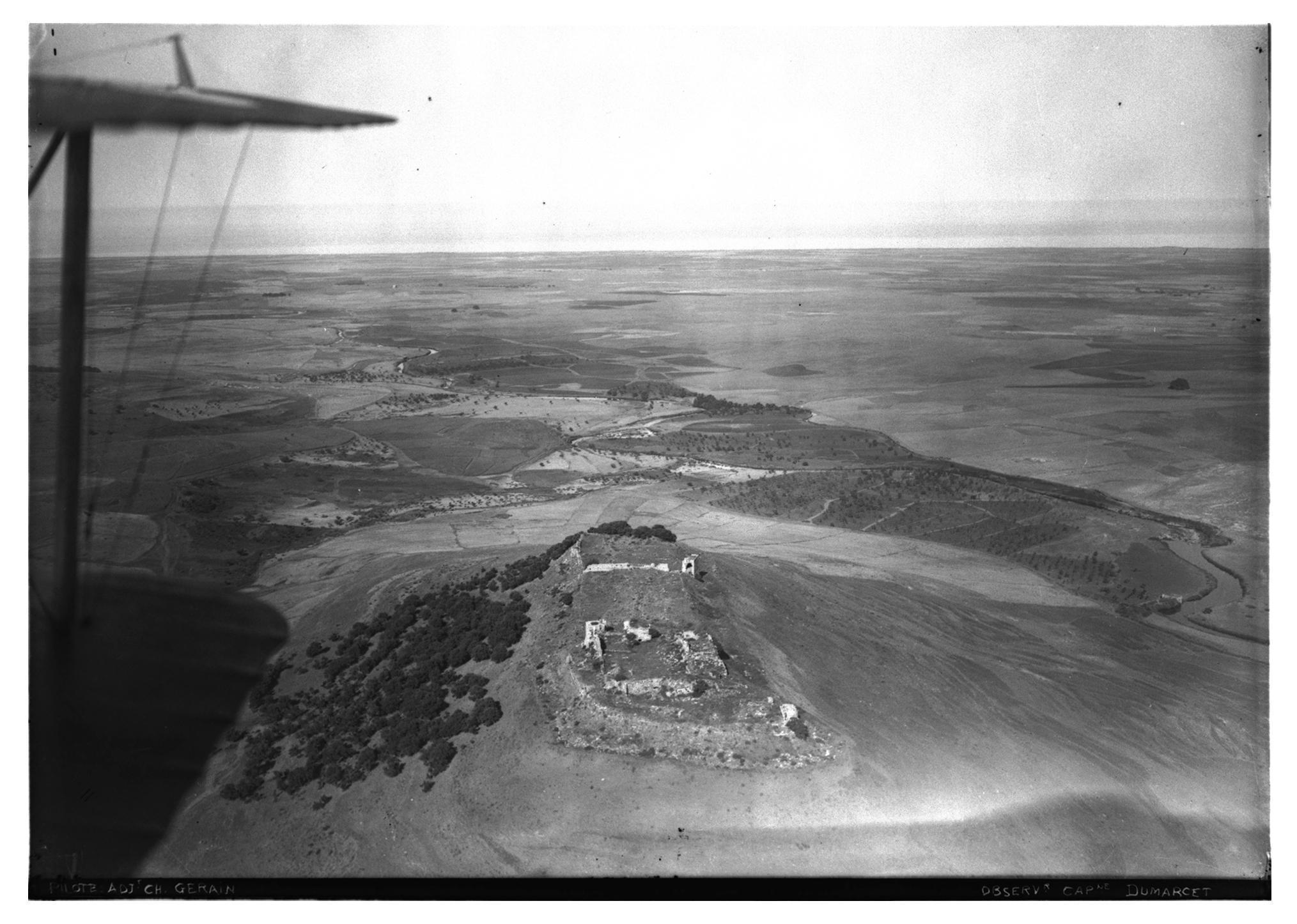
Aerial view of the Areimeh Castle (1929)

The castle was about 300 metres (980 ft) long and consisted of two courtyards surrounded by a redoubt, separated by two ditches. It was built on two main levels—upper and lower—with strong fortifications, although parts of the walls have recently collapsed. The entrance lay on the west side and was dominated by a large tower, from which the redoubt extended, incorporating several square towers along its length. The structure includes two solid stone towers built of white limestone, underground chambers, vaulted halls, arched doorways, and narrow defensive arrow slits. From the towers, wide views extend toward Safita, the Castle of Tripoli, and even nearby coastlines, highlighting the castle's defensive and surveillance role. Two construction phases have been identified: an early 12th-century phase built of basalt stone, and a later phase in limestone dating to the late 12th or early 13th century, likely corresponding to modifications made by the Templars after they captured the castle.

== Significance ==
Areimeh Castle is considered one of the historical fortresses of the Syrian coast and forms part of the region’s architectural and military heritage.

== See also ==
- List of castles in Syria
- Citadel of Damascus

== Bibliography ==
- Boas, Adrian J. (2006). Archaeology of the Military Orders: A Survey of the Urban Centres, Rural Settlements and Castles of the Military Orders in the Latin East (c.1120–1291). Routledge. ISBN 9781134422845.
- Kennedy, Hugh (1994). Crusader Castles. Cambridge University Press. ISBN 9780521420686.
- Murray, Alan V. (2015). The Crusades to the Holy Land: The Essential Reference Guide. ABC-CLIO. ISBN 9781610697804.
