= Areimeh =

Areimeh العريمة Arima
- Village
- Location in Syria
- Coordinates: 34°44′38″N 36°2′50″E
- Country: Syria
- Governorate: Tartus
- District: Tartus
- Subdistrict: Safsafa

Population (2004)
  - Total: 507
- Time zone: UTC+2 (EET)
  - Summer (DST): UTC+3 (EEST)
- City: C5331

Areimeh (Arabic: العريمة, romanized: ʿArīma) is a village in northwestern Syria, administratively part of the Tartus District of the Tartus Governorate. According to the Syria Central Bureau of Statistics (CBS), Areimeh had a population of 507 in the 2004 census. It is the site of the medieval fortress of Arima.

== Fortress ==
=== Description ===
Arima is 24 kilometers (15 mi) southeast of Tartus. It is situated on an oval hilltop, 170 meters (560 ft) above sea level, in the northern Akkar Plain, below the Jabal Ansariyah mountains. The hill slopes steeply on its north and south to the tributaries of the Nahr al-Abrash river.

The fortress is currently in a ruined state. From its peak it oversees the fortresses of Chastel Blanc and Gibelacar (Hisn Akkar). It covers a length of 300 meters (980 ft). It consists of two courtyards and redoubt, all three components separated from each other ditches. The redoubt is an enclosure with two towers on its sides, the larger tower positioned over the entrance to the fortress.

=== History ===
The Arima fortress buttressed the defense of Tartus, one of the two main towns of the Crusader County of Tripoli, and the Homs Gap. The date of Arima's construction is not known and the earliest date it is mentioned in the historical record is 1148, when it was in the possession of Raymond II, the Count of Tripoli. Raymond II had lost control of the fortress that year to a potential rival, Bertand of Toulouse, the son of Alfonso Jordan who had been poisoned and killed in Caesarea earlier that year. Bertrand probably seized Arima as it sat between Tartus and Tripoli, the seat of the County. Raymond called on the Muslim ruler Nur al-Din Zengi to intervene on his behalf. Nur al-Din responded by besieging Arima. The Muslim forces broke a hole through its walls and compelled Bertand to surrender.

Nur al-Din later raided and destroyed Arima and Chastel Blanc in Safita in 1171. The fortress was rebuilt soon after and entered the possession of the Knights Templar. The Muslim ruler of Syria and Egypt, Saladin, captured it in 1187 but it eventually reverted to Crusader control until falling to the Muslim Mamluk Sultanate in 1291.
