= Hodierna of Tripoli =

Countess of Tripoli from 1137 to 1152

Hodierna
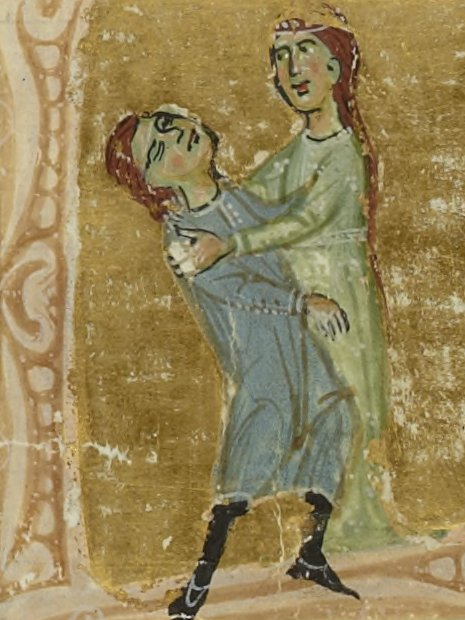
- 13th-century manuscript depiction of Hodierna holding the dying troubadour Jaufre Rudel

Countess of Tripoli
- Tenure: c. 1137–1152
- Born: c. 1116
- Died: c. 1162 (aged 45–46)
- Spouse: Raymond II of Tripoli
- Issue: Raymond III of Tripoli; Melisende of Tripoli
- House: House of Rethel
- Father: Baldwin II of Jerusalem
- Mother: Morphia of Melitene

Hodierna of Jerusalem (c. 1116 – c. 1162) was the countess of Tripoli through her marriage to Raymond II of Tripoli. She ruled the County of Tripoli as regent during the minority of their son Raymond III from 1152 until 1155.

Hodierna was the daughter of King Baldwin II of Jerusalem and sister of Queen Melisende. She may have been betrothed to Count Raymond II of Tripoli already as a child, but did not marry him until the 1130s. Hodierna was a politically active countess and is alleged to have played a part in the disposing of her husband's cousin and rival Bertrand. Her marriage was unhappy because of her husband's jealousy. Hodierna had just left Raymond when he was assassinated in 1152, and she returned to Tripoli to take charge of government in their son's name. After her son assumed power, Hodierna assisted her sister Queen Melisende until the latter's death in 1161. Hodierna died shortly after.

Countess Hodierna remains little known compared to her sisters Queen Melisende and Princess Alice. She has, however, been identified as the princesse lointaine in several troubadour poems and tales and of the works of art inspired by them.

== Early life ==
Hodierna was born c. 1115–17. She was the third daughter of Baldwin of Bourcq, a Frankish nobleman, and Morphia of Melitene, an Armenian noblewoman. Hodierna and her older sisters, Melisende and Alice, were born while their father was the count of Edessa. The County of Edessa was, along with the Kingdom of Jerusalem, the Principality of Antioch, and the County of Tripoli, one of the states established by the Franks, who defeated the Muslims of the Levant in the First Crusade.

In 1118 Baldwin was elected king of Jerusalem. The following year he installed his cousin Joscelin of Courtenay as the new count of Edessa and brought his family to Jerusalem. Hodierna gained another sister, Ioveta, after her parents were crowned king and queen in 1119.

In 1122 Count Pons of Tripoli rebelled against King Baldwin. Historian Kevin Lewis considers it "very possible" that Hodierna's betrothal to Raymond was first brought in the aftermath of this dispute up as a way to reconcile the two ruling families. Queen Morphia died probably in 1126 or 1127. King Baldwin no longer expected to have a son and started providing for his daughters and settling his succession. Melisende, the eldest daughter, was to be his heir; in 1129 she was married to Count Fulk V of Anjou. Alice, the second eldest, was married to Prince Bohemond II of Antioch in 1126. Lewis and Hans E. Mayer believe that Hodierna may have been betrothed to Raymond, son of Count Pons of Tripoli, already at this time. Ioveta, the youngest, was sent to the Convent of Saint Anne. Hodierna's father died in 1131, and was succeeded by Melisende and Fulk.

== Consort ==
=== Marriage ===
The crusader states in 1135

Count Pons was defeated by Muslims and killed in 1137. He was succeeded by his son, Raymond II. Lewis presumes that Hodierna's marriage to Raymond was delayed until c. 1132 because she was far too young in 1127. Historian Malcolm Barber believes that the union was the result of Queen Melisende's effort to provide for Hodierna and to link the ruling houses of all the crusader states. Hodierna, already called the countess of Tripoli but not accompanied by her husband, attended the court of King Fulk and Queen Melisende in Acre in December 1138. Hodierna and Raymond II had their first child, Raymond III, in 1140.

=== Rival claims ===
In 1144 the County of Edessa was conquered by Muslim leader Imad al-Din Zengi, which in 1148 led to the Second Crusade. Raymond's granduncle Count Alfonso Jordan of Toulouse arrived in the Levant with the crusade. Historian Jean Richard proposes that Alfonso intended to claim Tripoli. He died suddenly soon after his arrival; poisoning was widely suspected. An anonymous monk from France wrote that Alfonso was poisoned on the orders of Queen Melisende, who allegedly wished to safeguard Raymond and Hodierna's position in Tripoli. Lewis believes that Alfonso died of natural causes.

Alfonso's illegitimate son Bertrand stayed in the Levant after the crusade. He entered the County of Tripoli and seized the fortress of Urayma; contemporary Arabs thought this to be the first step to seizing the county. Raymond could not dislodge his cousin, and enlisted the help of Nur al-Din Zengi and Mu'in ad-Din Unur, who captured Urayma and Bertrand within it. Raymond's alliance with Muslims outraged other Franks. The anonymous monk accused Melisende of complicity. Historians have traditionally read the monk's account as saying that Bertrand was captured with his sister, but Lewis interprets it as saying that Melisende had an accomplice, her sister Hodierna, whose motive was to preserve her husband's domain, and accepts it as true.

=== Marital discord ===
According to legend the Provençal troubadour Jaufre Rudel fell in love with Hodierna, whom he had never seen; he fell ill while sailing to Tripoli and died in her arms soon after his arrival. Lewis believes that Rudel might have arrived with the Second Crusade. According to a "fanciful Occitan tale", as Lewis describes it, Hodierna had Rudel buried in the house of the Knights Templar in Tripoli. Lewis observes that this detail might hint that Hodierna was the one who brought the Templars into Tripoli.

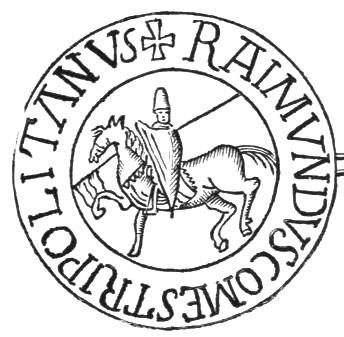
Hodierna's marriage with Raymond II, depicted on his seal, was destroyed by jealousy.

By 1152 Hodierna and Raymond's marriage was in a crisis. Lewis speculates that Raymond may have envied her higher social status. According to the legend involving Rudel, pilgrims returning from the Levant spread stories of Hodierna's beauty in Europe, and there were rumours that her daughter Melisende of Tripoli was born from an extramarital love affair, which Lewis believes may have led to Raymond's jealousy. Lewis speculates that, in the light of Hodierna's sister Melisende struggle for power with her husband, Fulk, and Hodierna's own alleged initiative in disposing of Bertrand of Toulouse, Raymond may have feared that Hodierna might threaten his authority; or that, at the time of growing tensions between Latin Christians and native Christians, Hodierna's mixed Latin-Armenian heritage posed a concern to Raymond.

In 1152 Hodierna's nephew King Baldwin III of Jerusalem, son of Queen Melisende, summoned a meeting of the crusader states' nobility in Tripoli. His main objective was to force his cousin Princess Constance of Antioch to choose a husband. Hodierna and Melisende, Constance's aunts, also attended, but all attempts failed. Melisende had arrived not just to see Constance, however, but also to mediate between Hodierna and Raymond. She was not successful, and decided to take Hodierna back to Jerusalem. Barber writes that Raymond accompanied the queen and the countess on a part of their journey south from Tripoli, while Lewis writes that he instead accompanied the princess on her way back to Antioch. Either way, Raymond was ambushed and killed by Assassins upon his return to Tripoli. King Baldwin immediately recalled his mother and aunt to Tripoli to attend the count's funeral, after which all the nobles of the county paid homage to the countess, her son, and her daughter on the king's orders.

== Widowhood ==
Raymond III was underage when the assassination of his father made him count. Richard sees no proof of Hodierna assuming rule as regent in William's account, whereas Lewis believes that Hodierna was given charge because the nobility took an oath to her and her minor children. Lewis believes that she was a good fit because she had demonstrated initiative and political skill, and because she was loyal to her Jerusalemite family. The appointment of Hodierna contravened Raymond II's instruction that the county should be ruled by the "master of the county", an otherwise unknown functionary, if it should pass to a minor. Soon after Raymond II's death, Raymond III was sent to live at the court of his cousin Baldwin III. Hodierna administered the county probably until 1155, when her son reached the age of majority upon his fifteenth birthday. Historian Bernard Hamilton suggests that it was Hodierna who initiated the establishment of Belmont, the first Cistercian monastery in the crusader states. In 1157 Queen Melisende, her stepdaughter Countess Sibylla of Flanders, and Countess Hodierna intervened, against the Gregorian laws, to secure the election of the queen's chaplain Amalric of Nesle as the new Latin patriarch of Jerusalem.

In 1160 the widowed Emperor Manuel I Komnenos asked King Baldwin to select a new wife for the emperor among the noblewomen of the crusader states. The emperor expressed particular interest in Baldwin's cousins Melisende of Tripoli and Maria of Antioch. Baldwin chose Melisende, and Manuel accepted. Hodierna and her sister Queen Melisende spent a year preparing the girl's dowry at a great expense to the royal treasury. In July 1161 Countess Hodierna and her children arrived in Nazareth. Lewis and Richard agree that they came to discuss with Baldwin the plans for the imminent marriage of Hodierna's daughter, to whom they referred to in a charter as "the future empress of the throne of Constantinople". Throughout 1161 Emperor Manuel prevaricated, however, and when pressed by Baldwin in mid-1162 finally revealed that he was not going to marry Melisende. The family were shocked and humiliated, and soon learned that the emperor had secretly negotiated a marriage with Maria of Antioch instead.

Queen Melisende had a stroke in 1161. Countess Hodierna and her surviving sister, Abbess Ioveta, cared for the queen until her death on 11 September. Hodierna herself died on 21 December. The year and cause of her death are not recorded. She last appears in the written record in 1161.

== Legacy ==
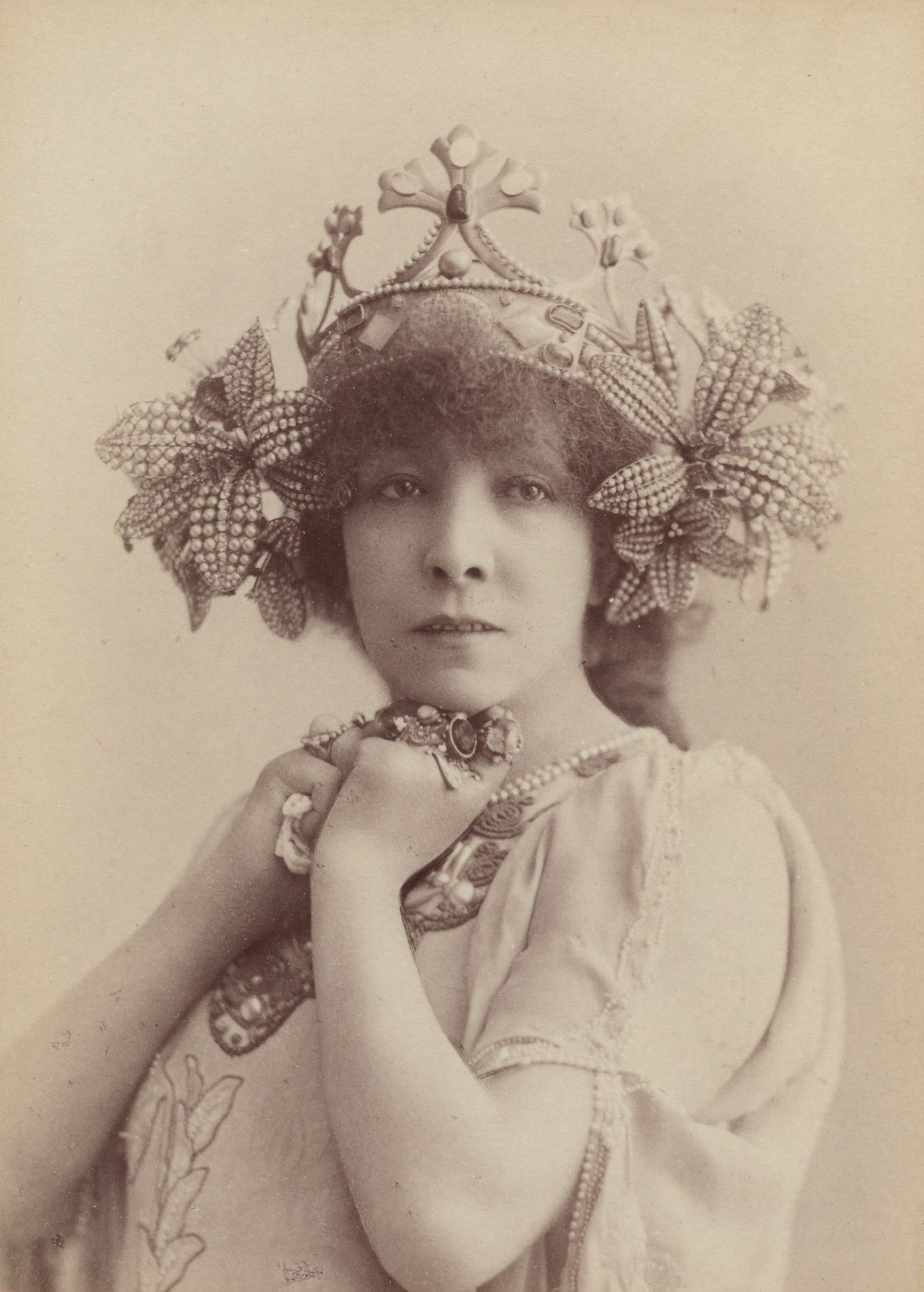
Sarah Bernhardt in La Princesse lointaine, inspired by the legendary love of Rudel for the countess of Tripoli

Lewis believes that Archbishop William of Tyre refrained from inviting any criticism of Hodierna because of his support for her son in the politics of Jerusalem. Hence, he argues, he had motive to suppress information about her involvement, if any, in the capture of Bertrand of Toulouse by the Muslims. The career of Raymond III, in Lewis's opinion, followed the "somewhat disappointing example set by his father rather than the more promising precedent of his mother", though she had a greater influence on Raymond III.

Lewis concludes that Hodierna has been overlooked by historians in favor of her "more famous and better documented" older sisters, Melisende and Alice, despite being just as willing to engage in politics. Whereas most countesses of Tripoli are comparatively undistinguished figures, Lewis finds that Hodierna "eclipsed her husband", but was in the posterity reduced to being the princesse lointaine, a "beautiful yet voiceless target of a distant stranger's affections". Rudel's obsession with Hodierna remained a topic of popular interest into the modern age: in the 19th-century Edmond Rostand made it the subject of his operetta La Princesse lointaine, and in the 20th century P. G. Wodehouse mentioned it in a novella. Thus, Lewis notes, the legacy of Tripoli under Raymond II and Hodierna were not political or military achievements but "lustful, exotic and even farcical fantasies".

== Sources ==
- Barber, Malcolm (2012). The Crusader States. Yale University Press. ISBN 978-0300189315.
- Hamilton, Bernard (1978). "Women in the Crusader States: The Queens of Jerusalem". In Derek Baker (ed.). Medieval Women. Ecclesiastical History Society. ISBN 9780631125396.
- Lewis, Kevin James (2017). The Counts of Tripoli and Lebanon in the Twelfth Century: Sons of Saint-Gilles. Routledge. ISBN 978-1-4724-5890-2.
- Lewis, Kevin James (2013). "Countess Hodierna of Tripoli: From Crusader Politician to "Princesse Lointaine"" (PDF). Assuming Gender. 3 (1). Cardiff University Press: 1. doi:10.18573/ipics.58.
- Mayer, Hans Eberhard (1985). "The Succession to Baldwin II of Jerusalem: English Impact on the East". Dumbarton Oaks Papers. 39. Dumbarton Oaks: 139–147. doi:10.2307/1291522. JSTOR 1291522.
- Richard, J. (1945). Le comté de Tripoli sous la dynastie Toulousaine: 1102 - 1187. Bibliothèque archéologique et historique (in French). Geuthner.
- Runciman, Steven (1952). A History of the Crusades: The Kingdom of Jerusalem and the Frankish East, 1100-1187. Vol. 2. Cambridge University Press. ISBN 0241298768.
