= Bertrand of Toulouse (son of Alfonso Jordan) =

12th century crusader

Bertrand (fl. 1147–1159) was the illegitimate son of Alfonso Jordan, Count of Toulouse. He accompanied his father to the Levant during the Second Crusade. Instead of returning to his homeland afterwards, he captured 'Urayma, a fortress in the County of Tripoli in 1148 or 1149, reportedly in an attempt to seize the whole county from his kinsman Count Raymond II. Raymond persuaded two Syrian Muslim rulers Nur al-Din and Unur to attack 'Urayma. They captured Bertrand, and he lived in captivity until 1159, when he was set free due to an agreement between Nur al-Din and the Byzantine Emperor Manuel I Komnenos about the release of Nur al-Din's Christian prisoners. No more detail of his life is known.

== Background and early life ==
Bertrand was the illegitimate son of Alfonso Jordan, Count of Toulouse, by an unknown mistress. Alfonso Jordan was the younger son of a prominent leader of the First Crusade, Count Raymond IV of Toulouse. Raymond began the siege of the Levantine city of Tripoli in the aftermath of the crusade in 1103, and Alfonso Jordan was born in his father's camp near the city in the same year. Although Raymond could not capture the city, he styled himself count of Tripoli by the time Alfonso Jordan was born. After his father died in an accident in 1105, the underage Alfonso Jordan was brought to Toulouse by his widowed mother, Elvira of Castile, to claim his father's county in southern France. Toulouse had been ruled by his elder half-brother, also called Bertrand, born to their father's previous marriage that had been annulled on account of consanguinity by church authorities. The elder Bertrand ceded Toulouse to Alfonso Jordan and went to Tripoli to complete the city's conquest. He captured Toulouse with the assistance of neighboring Catholic rulers and a Genoese fleet in 1109. He was succeeded as count of Tripoli by his son, Pons, in 1112, and by Pons's son, Raymond II, in 1137.

== Second Crusade ==
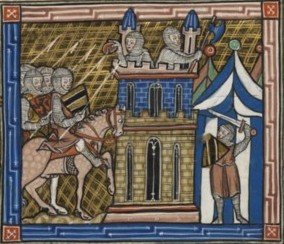
Siege of Damascus (1148): Bertrand was one of the crusaders attacking the Syrian city.

Alfonso Jordan joined the Second Crusade and sailed for the Levant c. 15 August 1147. Bertrand accompanied his father and they landed at the city of Acre in the Kingdom of Jerusalem. The medievalist Christopher Tyerman writes that Alfonso Jordan, a legitimate son, "clearly possessed of a stronger formal claim" to Tripoli than Raymond II, the grandchild of Alfonso Jordan's bastard half-brother. According to the historian Jean Richard, Alfonso Jordan could claim the county because he was "born in the purple", that is after his father assumed the title of count. Richard also thinks that Alfonso Jordan wanted to seize the county for Bertrand, while bequeathing Toulouse to his legitimate son, the future Raymond V.

Alfonso Jordan died unexpectedly after reaching the town of Caesarea Maritima. Rumours soon attributed his death to poisoning. The unidentified author of a 13th-century Syriac chronicle accuses Raymond II of the murder, presenting it as a preemptive act to prevent Alfonso Jordan from announcing his claim to the county. Bertrand continued the crusade following his father's demise, and participated in the unsuccessful siege of Damascus in late July 1148. After this fiasco, most crusaders left the Levant, but Bertrand stayed behind.

== Conflict and captivity ==
Bertrand went to the County of Tripoli and seized the fortress 'Urayma in the north in 1148 or 1149. Richard and the medievalist Kevin J. Lewis suppose that Tripolitan noblemen, especially the fortress's lord, supported Bertrand. The nearly contemporary Muslim historians Ibn al-Athir and Kamal al-Din ibn al-Adim write that the capture of 'Urayma was part of Bertrand's wider strategy of seizing the whole county. They add that Raymond II approached two powerful Syrian Muslim rulers, Nur al-Din Zengi and Mu'in ad-Din Unur, for assistance because his army was not strong enough to attack 'Urayma. Their armies marched as far as the fortress without resistance, and captured Bertrand, his mother and their retinue. Raymond's alliance with the Muslims scandalized Christians. An anonymous monk from France accuses Queen Melisende of Jerusalem, sister-in-law of Count Raymond II, of complicity by "treachery". Historians have traditionally read the monk's account as saying that a sister of Bertrand was also captured, but Lewis interprets it as implicating Melisende's sister Countess Hodierna, wife of Raymond, in the capture. Bertrand was held in captivity in the Syrian city of Aleppo when negotiations between the Byzantine Emperor Manuel I Komnenos and Nur al-Din led to the release of Nur al-Din's Christian prisoners. Bertrand was one of those who were set free, but no detail of his later life is known.

== Sources ==
- Barber, Malcolm (2012). The Crusader States. Yale University Press. ISBN 978-0-300-11312-9.
- Lewis, Kevin James (2017). The Counts of Tripoli and Lebanon in the Twelfth Century: Sons of Sant-Gilles. Rulers of the Latin East. Routledge. ISBN 978-1-4724-5890-2.
- Lock, Peter (2006). The Routledge Companion to the Crusades. Routledge Companion to History. Routledge. ISBN 978-0-415-39312-6.
- Richard, Jean (1945). "Le comté de Tripoli sous la dynastie toulousaine (1102–1187)" [The County of Tripoli under the Dynastie of Toulouse (1102–1187)]. Bibliothèque archéologique et historique (in French). 1 (4): viii–96. ISSN 0768-2506.
- Tyerman, Christopher (2007) [2006]. God's War: A New History of the Crusades. Penguin Books. ISBN 978-0-140-26980-2.
