= Princesse lointaine =

Stock character

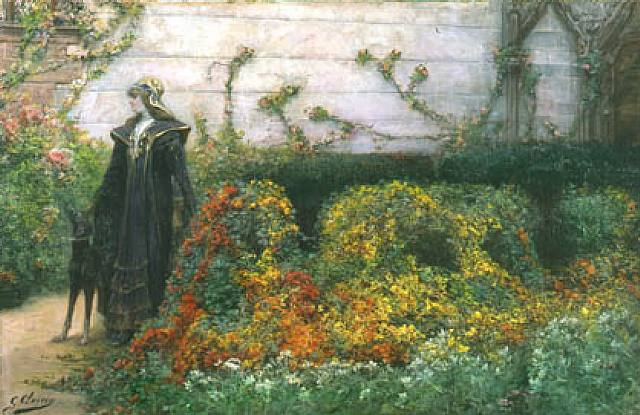
Sarah Bernhardt as Mélissinde in La Princesse Lointaine

A princesse lointaine (French: “distant princess”) is a literary archetype representing an idealized and unattainable beloved. The term originates from the play La Princesse Lointaine (1895) by the French dramatist Edmond Rostand, based on the life of the 12th-century troubadour Jaufré Rudel, and is rooted in the traditions of medieval European romance and troubadour poetry.

In classical medieval literature, the princesse lointaine was typically portrayed as a woman of superior social rank, exceptional beauty, moral perfection, and refined virtue. She was often geographically distant or socially unreachable, which intensified the emotional and spiritual devotion of her admirer, most commonly a knight-errant of lower status. The distance—whether physical, social, or symbolic—was central to the power of the trope, transforming romantic desire into a form of spiritual aspiration.

A frequently cited legendary example is the 12th-century troubadour Jaufré Rudel, who was said to have fallen in love with Hodierna of Tripoli solely on the basis of descriptions of her beauty and virtue, without having seen her in person. This form of idealized long-distance devotion became known as amour de loin (“love from afar”), a key motif in medieval romantic literature.

The concept also intersects with the tradition of courtly love, in which the beloved woman was elevated to a near-sacred status. In this framework, the lady functioned as a moral and spiritual guide, and the knight’s devotion replaced or paralleled traditional religious devotion. Symbolic practices developed around this ideal, including the wearing of a lady’s colors: blue and black often represented loyalty and constancy, while green could indicate inconstancy or emotional instability.

Although originally gendered as a female figure, the term has since evolved beyond its medieval context. In modern literary criticism, princesse lointaine is used more broadly to describe any romantic figure defined primarily by inaccessibility, emotional distance, or impossibility. The expression has also been extended metaphorically to describe unattainable ideals, ambitions, or abstract goals in both literary and psychological contexts.

Today, the princesse lointaine remains an influential archetype in the study of romance literature, medieval studies, and psychology of desire, symbolizing the persistent human tendency to idealize what lies beyond reach.

== See also ==
- Courtly love
- Domnei
- Girl next door
- Unrequited love
