= Cecile of France =

Cecile
- Lady of Tarsus and Mamistra, Countess of Tripoli
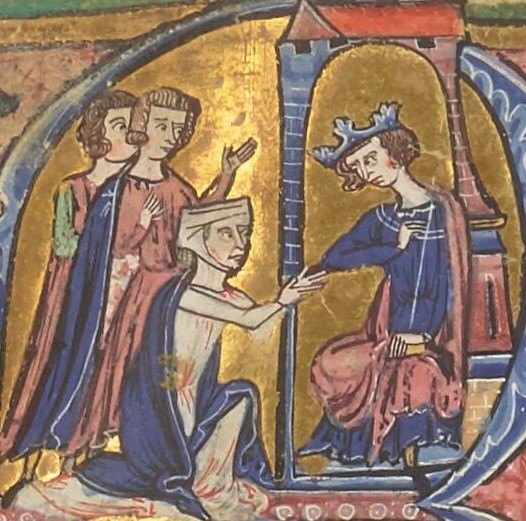
- Countess Cecile kneeling before her half-brother King Fulk
- Born: 1097
- Died: 1145 (aged 47–48)
- Spouses: Tancred, Prince of Galilee (m. 1106; died 1112) Pons, Count of Tripoli (m. 1112; died 1137)
- Issue: Raymond II, Count of Tripoli
- Father: Philip I, King of France
- Mother: Bertrade de Montfort

Cecile of France (1097 – 1145) was a Frankish princess who became countess of Tripoli. She was the daughter of King Philip I of France and Bertrade de Montfort.

Cecile's first marriage was arranged while Prince Bohemond I of Antioch was visiting the French court seeking support against the Byzantine emperor, Alexios I Komnenos. She sailed for Antioch at the end of 1106 and became lady of Tarsus and Mamistra in Cilician Armenia. Cecile married Prince Tancred of Galilee, regent of Antioch, in late 1106.

While dying in 1112, Tancred made Pons of Tripoli promise to marry Cecile, and Tancred gave her the fortresses of Arcicanum and Rugia as dowry. They married in 1112. In 1133, Pons was besieged at his castle of Montferrand by Imad ad-Din Zengi, atabeg of Mosul, and Cecile appealed to her half-brother King Fulk of Jerusalem to come to his aid. Zengi abandoned the siege, but during a second siege in 1137, Pons was captured and killed. Cecile and Pons' son, Raymond II succeeded him. Cecile died c. 1145.

== Children with Pons ==
- Raymond II, Count of Tripoli
- Philip
- Agnes, wife of Renaud II, Lord of Margat

== Sources ==
- Bom, Myra Miranda (2022). Constance of France: Womanhood and Agency in Twelfth-Century Europe. Palgrave Macmillan.
- Hodgson, Natasha R. (2007). Women, Crusading and the Holy Land in Historical Narrative. The Boydell Press.
- McDougall, Sara (2017). Royal Bastards: The Birth of Illegitimacy, 800-1230. Oxford University Press.
- Lewis, Kevin James (2017). The Counts of Tripoli and Lebanon in the Twelfth Century: Sons of Saint-Gilles. Routledge.
- Pernoud, Regine (2003). The Crusaders. Translated by Grant, Enid. Ignatius Press.
- Richard, Jean (1999). The Crusades, c.1071-c.1291. Translated by Birrell, Jean. Cambridge University Press.
- Stevenson, William Barron (1907). The Crusaders in the East: A Brief History of the Wars of Islam with the Latins in Syria during the Twelfth and Thirteenth Centuries. Cambridge at the University Press.
