= Raymond II of Tripoli =

Count of Tripoli from 1137 to 1152

Raymond II
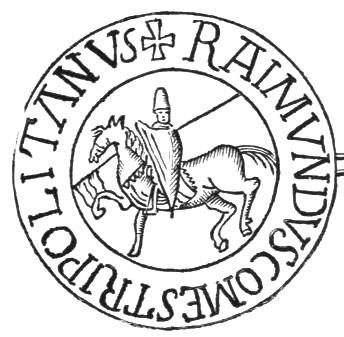
- His seal

Count of Tripoli
- Reign: 1137–1152
- Predecessor: Pons
- Successor: Raymond III
- Born: c. 1116
- Died: 1152 (aged 35–36); Tripoli
- Spouse: Hodierna of Jerusalem
- Issue: Raymond III; Melisende
- House: House of Toulouse
- Father: Pons of Tripoli
- Mother: Cecile of France
- Religion: Catholicism

Raymond II (Latin: Raimundus; c. 1116 – 1152) was count of Tripoli from 1137 to 1152. He succeeded his father, Pons, who was killed during a campaign that a commander from Damascus launched against Tripoli. Raymond accused the local Christians of betraying his father and invaded their villages in the Mount Lebanon area. He also had many of them tortured and executed. Raymond was captured during an invasion by Imad ad-Din Zengi, atabeg of Mosul, who gained the two important castles of Montferrand (at present-day Baarin in Syria) and Rafaniya in exchange for his release in the summer of 1137.

Since his army proved unable to secure the defence of the eastern borders of his county, Raymond granted several forts to the Knights Hospitaller in 1142. The sudden death of his father's uncle, Alfonso Jordan, count of Toulouse, during the Second Crusade gave rise to gossip which suggested that Raymond had poisoned him because Alfonso had allegedly wanted to lay claim to Tripoli. Alfonso's illegitimate son, Bertrand, seized the fortress of Areimeh in the County of Tripoli in 1149, but Raymond recaptured it with the assistance of Muslim rulers. Raymond ceded the castle to the Knights Templar.

Raymond was unhappily married to Hodierna of Jerusalem. Her sister, Queen Melisende of Jerusalem, came to Tripoli to put an end to their conflict. Hodierna preferred to leave Tripoli for Jerusalem along with her sister and Raymond escorted them for a short distance. On his way back to Tripoli, a group of Assassins stabbed him at the southern gate of the town. He was the first Christian ruler to be murdered by Assassins.

== Early life ==
Raymond was the elder son of Count Pons of Tripoli and Cecile of France. The date of his birth is unknown, but William of Tyre noted that Raymond was "adolescent" when his father died, implying that he was at least fifteen in 1137. He and his younger brother, Philip, were mature enough to sign their father's charters in the early 1130s. Historian Kevin J. Lewis argues that Raymond "could easily have been in his early twenties" in 1137, suggesting that he was born around 1116. Lewis also states that Raymond was most probably betrothed to Hodierna, a younger daughter of King Baldwin II of Jerusalem, "as early as 1127".

== Reign ==
=== War with Muslim powers ===
The Crusader states in 1135

Bazwāj, the mamluk (or slave) commander of Damascus made a raid against Tripoli and defeated Pons in a battle. Pons fled from the battlefield, but native Christians captured and handed him over to Bazwāj who had him executed on 25 March 1137. Bazwāj captured a frontier fort but returned to Damascus without attacking Tripoli. To take vengeance for his father's death, Raymond invaded the local Christians' settlements in the Mount Lebanon area and captured many of them. The captured men, women and children were taken to Tripoli where the majority were tortured and executed. William of Tyre remarked that Raymond's campaign against the local Christians provided "the first lessons of his martial courage".

After learning of Pons' death, Zengi invaded Tripoli in July 1137. A Muslim historian, Kamal al-Din, would later claim that Zengi attacked Tripoli only after Raymond mustered his troops to force Zengi to lift the siege of Homs. Lewis emphasizes that Kamal al-Din's report is doubtful, because Bazwāj had almost annihilated the army of Tripoli, preventing Raymond from launching major campaigns. After Zengi laid siege to Montferrand, Raymond sent envoys to King Fulk of Jerusalem, his maternal uncle and brother-in-law, urging him to hurry to the besieged fortress. Shortly after Fulk and his army crossed the frontier of the County of Tripoli, the envoys of Raymond of Poitiers, prince of Antioch, informed him that the Byzantine Emperor John II Komnenos had invaded Antioch.

Fulk and Raymond of Tripoli decided to launch an assault on Zengi's forces before marching to Antioch, because they thought they could easily defeat the atabeg. However, Zengi lifted the siege of Homs and made an unexpected attack on the united forces of Jerusalem and Tripoli. Thousands of Christian soldiers were killed during the battle, and even more (including Raymond) were captured; Fulk and his retinue fled to Montferrand. Zengi again besieged Montferrand, but began negotiations with the besieged when he heard that further relief was on its way from Raymond of Poitiers, Joscelin II of Edessa, and Emperor John II Komnenos. Those besieged in the fortress did not know of these movements but readily agreed to hand over the castle to Zengi in exchange for a safe passage and the release of Raymond and all other Christian captives.

=== Attempts to consolidate ===
The Byzantine author, Theodore Prodromos, praised John II Komnenos for having made Tripoli subject shortly after 1137. Decades later the Byzantine historian Niketas Choniates would also describe Raymond as a liegeman (vassal) of John II Komnenos. Both sources suggest that Raymond renewed his predecessors' oath of loyalty towards the Byzantine emperor, according to Lewis. Nevertheless, Raymond did not participate in John II Komnenos' military campaign against the Muslim rulers of Northern Syria in 1138. Historian Ralph-Johannes Lilie says the lack of sufficient military forces prevented Raymond from assisting the Byzantines.

Raymond granted several settlements to the Knights Hospitallers along the eastern borders of his county in 1142. His grant included "the fortress of the Kurds" which developed into the important Crusader castle of Krak des Chevaliers during the following decades. He also transferred his rights to Montferrand and Rafaniya, both seized by Zengi in 1137, to the Hospitallers if they could recapture them. When establishing a military order on the eastern borderland, Raymond only wanted to secure the defence of his county, but his magnanimous grant laid the foundation of an almost independent ecclesiastic state.

=== Family affairs ===
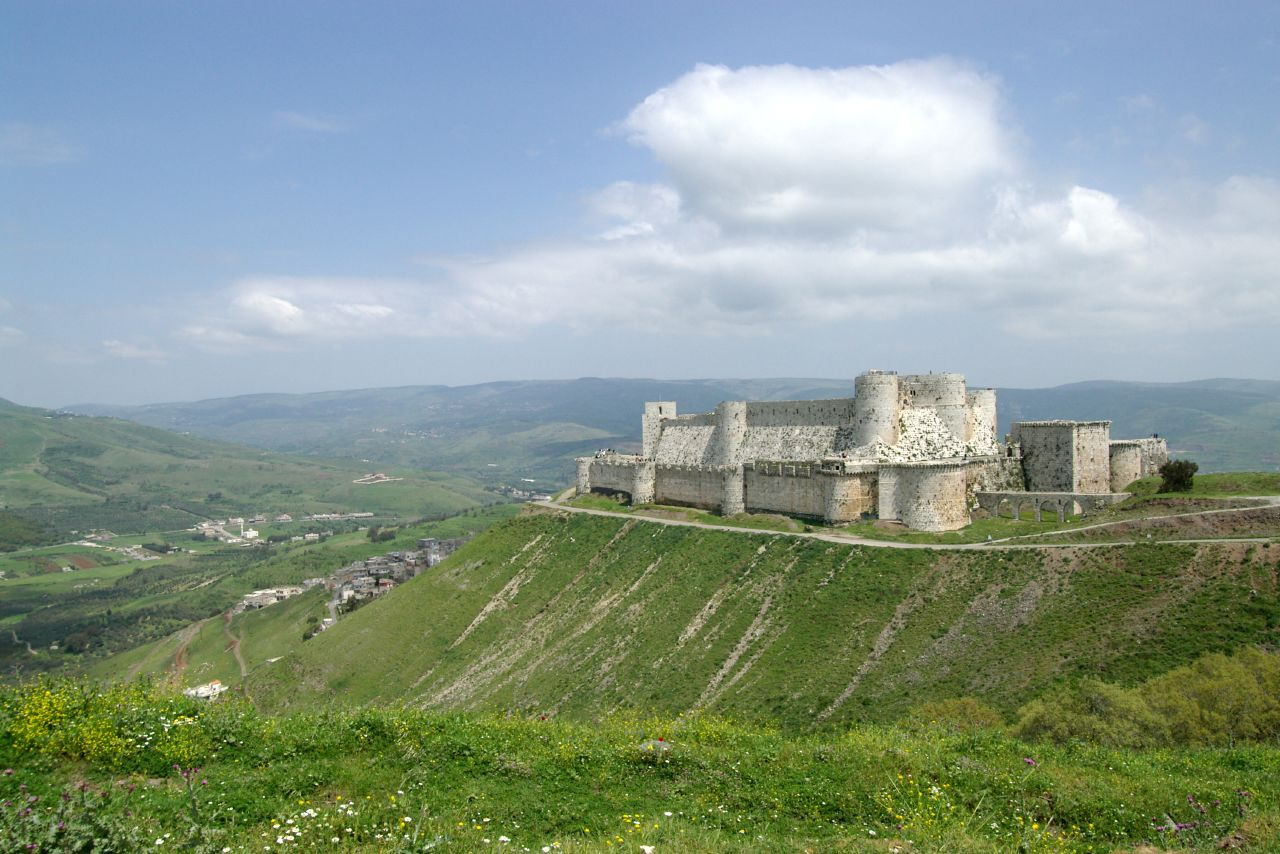
Krak des Chevaliers: the large fortress built by the Knights Hospitaller on the land that Raymond had granted to them in 1142

Raymond was a great-grandson of Raymond of Saint-Gilles, one of the leaders of the First Crusade who was the first to style himself as count of Tripoli (even before Tripoli had been captured). However, Raymond was descended from Saint-Gilles through Bertrand of Toulouse, a son with disputed legitimacy. Bertrand's legitimate half-brother, Alfonso Jordan, was born after their father started to use the title of count of Tripoli and so was their father's lawful heir in accordance with the idea of porphyrogeniture.

Alfonso Jordan was one of the supreme commanders of the Second Crusade, but he died shortly after he landed at the Holy Land in April 1148. Because of his unexpected death, gossip about his murder started spreading among the Crusaders, although he most probably died of natural causes, as a consequence of his lengthy voyage across the Mediterranean Sea. An anonymous Syrian chronicler accused Raymond of the crime, stating that he poisoned Alfonso because he feared that his great-uncle had come to seize Tripoli. Lewis emphasizes, the chronicle "is hardly the most reliable piece of evidence, so some skepticism about Raymond's involvement in Alfons's death is surely advisible". Another contemporaneous author—the continuator of Sigebert of Gembloux's chronicle—was convinced that Raymond's sister-in-law Queen Melisende of Jerusalem had poisoned Alfonso because she wanted to prevent him from claiming Tripoli.

Raymond did not attend the assembly of the leaders of the crusade at Acre on 24 June 1148. He also kept away from the Crusaders' siege of Damascus in 1148. In contrast with Raymond, Alfonso Jordan's illegitimate son, Bertrand, who had arrived in his father's retinue, participated in the Crusaders' fights. He decided to lay claim to Tripoli and took possession of the fortress of Areimeh in the summer of 1149. After being unable to expel Bertrand from the fort which controlled important roads in the county, Raymond sought assistance from Mu'in ad-Din Unur, the Muslim ruler of Damascus, as well as from Zengi's son, Nur ad-Din. The two Muslim rulers captured Areimeh and imprisoned Bertrand and his family. After destroying the castle, they returned the territory to Raymond. Raymond granted the land to the Knights Templar in the early 1150s.

=== Last years ===
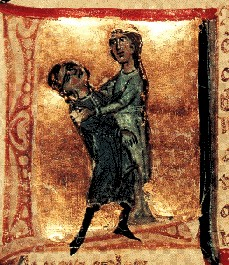
The trobadour Jaufre Rudel dying in the arms of Raymond's wife, Hodierna

King Baldwin III of Jerusalem crossed Tripoli during his march towards northern Syria in the summer of 1150. He wanted to meet with the Byzantine Emperor Manuel I Komnenos who had purchased the last fortresses of the County of Edessa. Because of a conflict between Baldwin and his mother, Melisende, her supporters had refused to accompany the king, who thus asked Raymond to join him. Raymond agreed and accompanied Baldwin to the meeting and they jointly supervised the transfer of the castles to the Byzantines.

A Fatimid fleet pillaged Tripoli during a plundering raid against the coastal towns in the summer of 1151. The Egyptians destroyed ships and killed or captured hundreds of people in the harbour. In December, Crusader troops invaded the Beqaa Valley, seizing prisoners and booty during their campaign before the Muslim governor of Baalbek routed them. Nur ad-Din broke into the county in April or May 1152 and captured Tortosa, leaving a garrison there. Baldwin III came to Tripoli and held a "general court", attended by the leading barons of the Kingdom of Jerusalem and the County of Tripoli. After the king's arrival, Nur ad-Din's troops left Tortosa, but they destroyed the fortress. Since its restoration proved costly, Raymond ceded Tortosa first to the local bishop, then to the Templars who transformed it into one of their most important headquarters.

An "enmity born from marital jealousy" had meanwhile emerged between Raymond and his wife, according to William of Tyre. Her sister, Melisende, who attended the assembly at Tripoli, tried to mediate between them, but their relationship remained tense. After the assembly was closed, Melisende and Hodierna left Tripoli for Jerusalem. Raymond rode out with them for a short distance, and on his way back to Tripoli, he was killed by a group of Assassins—fanatics employed by the head of the Nizari to murder their enemies—at the southern gate to the city, along with two of his knights. The motivation of the crime is unknown. Since the Nizari had not previously killed Christian rulers, modern historians propose that the establishment of the Templars at Tortosa had outraged them.

== Family ==
Raymond's close family and relationship with neighbouring rulers

Pons II of Toulouse	Almodis of La Marche
William IV of Toulouse	Raymond IV of Toulouse
Philippa of Toulouse	Bertrand of Tripoli	Alfonso Jordan
Baldwin II of Jerusalem	Morphia of Melitene	Cecilia of France	Pons of Tripoli	Bertrand
Fulk V of Anjou	Melisende of Jerusalem	Alice of Jerusalem	Hodierna of Jerusalem	Raymond II of Tripoli	Agnes of Tripoli
Baldwin III of Jerusalem	Amalric of Jerusalem	Constance of Antioch	Raymond of Poitiers	Melisende of Tripoli	Raymond III of Tripoli

The exact date of the marriage of Raymond and Hodierna is unknown. According to historian Peter Lock, it took place in the spring of 1133, after her brother-in-law, Fulk of Jerusalem, provided military assistance to Raymond's father against Zengi. Raymond and Hodierna's son, Raymond III, was born only in 1140, thus he was still a minor when he succeeded his father in 1152. Raymond and Hodierna's daughter, Melisende, was famed for her beauty, but her delicate health and rumours about her mother's possible infidelity prevented her marriage to the Byzantine Emperor Manuel I Komnenos.

== See also ==
- List of unsolved murders (before 1900)

== Sources ==
- Barber, Malcolm (2012). The Crusader States. Yale University Press. ISBN 978-0-300-11312-9.
- Daftary, Farhad (2007). The Ismāʿı̄lı̄s: Their History and Doctrines (Second ed.). Cambridge: Cambridge University Press. ISBN 978-0-521-61636-2.
- Dunbabin, Jean (2000). France in the Making, 843-1180. Oxford University Press. ISBN 0-19-820846-4.
- Lewis, Kevin James (2017). The Counts of Tripoli and Lebanon in the Twelfth Century: Sons of Saint-Gilles. Routledge. ISBN 978-1-4724-5890-2.
- Lilie, Ralph-Johannes (1993). Byzantium and the Crusader States 1096-1204. Oxford University Press. ISBN 0-19-820407-8.
- Lock, Peter (2006). The Routledge Companion to the Crusades. Routledge. ISBN 9-78-0-415-39312-6.
- Runciman, Steven (1989). A History of the Crusades, Volume II: The Kingdom of Jerusalem and the Frankish East, 1100-1187. Cambridge University Press. ISBN 0-521-06163-6.

Raymond II of Tripoli House of Toulouse Born: c. 1116 Died: 1152
Regnal titles
Preceded by Pons	Count of Tripoli; 1137–1152	Succeeded by Raymond III
