= Jean Richard (historian) =

French historian (1921–2021)

Jean Barthélémy Richard (7 February 1921 – 25 January 2021) was a French historian, who specialized in medieval history. He was an authority on the Crusades, and his work on the crusades has been qualified as "unsurpassed". Richard was a member of the Institut de France. He was President of the prestigious Académie des Inscriptions et Belles-Lettres in 2002. He was born in Le Kremlin-Bicêtre, France in February 1921. Richard died in January 2021 in Dijon, two weeks shy of his 100th birthday.

== Publications ==
- Le comté de Tripoli sous la dynastie toulousaine (1102-1187), 1945
- Longnon, Jean (1953). "Le royaume latin de Jérusalem". Journal des Savants. 4 (1). Presses universitaires de France: 161–183. OCLC 1225909.
- Les ducs de Bourgogne et la formation du duché XIe-XIVe siècle, 1954 (thèse)
- Le cartulaire de Marcigny-sur-Loire (1045-1144), 1957 (thèse complémentaire)
- Histoire de la Bourgogne, 1957
- Chypre sous les Lusignans. Documents chypriotes des Archives du Vatican (XIVe et XVe siècles), 1962
- Simon de Saint-Quentin. Histoire des Tartares, 1965
- L'esprit de la croisade, 1969
- La papauté et les missions d'Orient au Moyen Âge, 1977
- Histoire de la Bourgogne, 1978 (dir.)
- Les récits de voyages et de pèlerinages, 1981
- Le livre des remembrances de la Secrète du Royaume de Chypre (1468-1469), 1983 (en coll. avec T. Papadopoullos)
- Saint Louis, roi d'une France féodale, soutien de la Terre Sainte, 1983
- The Crusades: c. 1071 - c. 1291 (1999), Cambridge University Press, ISBN 978-0-521-62566-1, translated by Jean Birrell
- Histoire des croisades, Fayard, (1996)
