= Jaufre Rudel =

French prince and troubadour (died c. 1147)

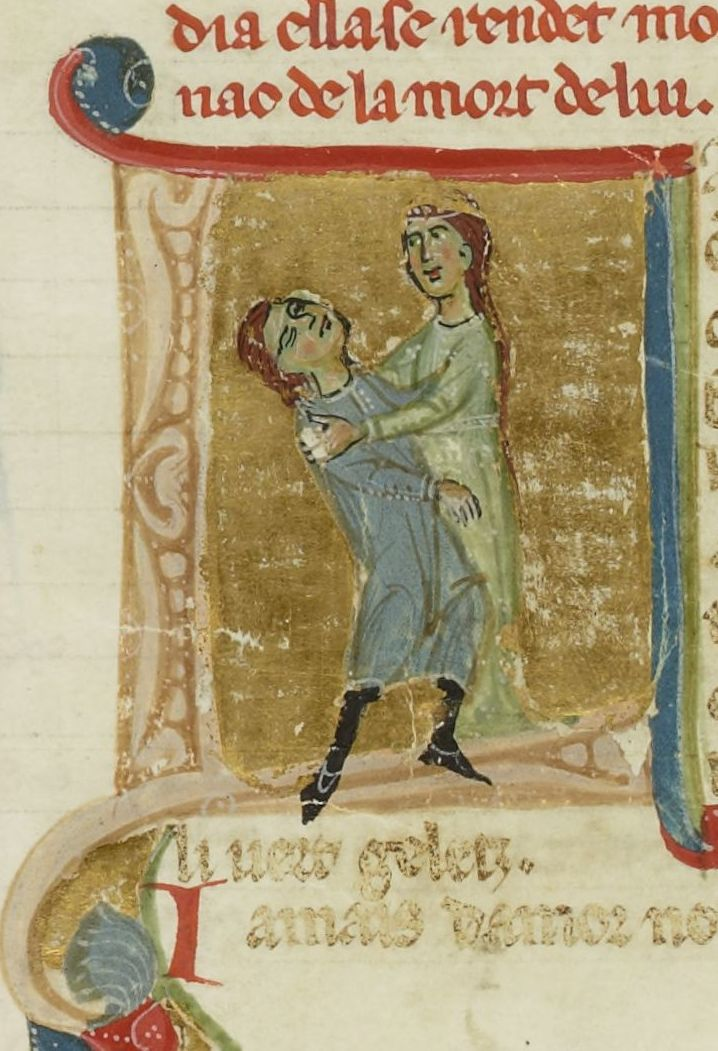
Jaufre Rudel dies in the arms of Hodierna of Tripoli (from chansonnier I, Lombardy, 13th century, Bib. Nat. Française 854, fol. 121v.)

Jaufre Rudel (Jaufré in modern Occitan) was the prince of Blaye (Princes de Blaia) and a troubadour of the early- to mid-12th century, who probably died during the Second Crusade, in or after 1147. He is noted for developing the theme of "love from afar" (amor de lonh or amour de loin) in his songs.

Very little is known about his life, but a reference to him in a contemporary song by Marcabru describes him as being oltra mar—across the sea, probably on the Second Crusade in 1147. Probably he was the son of Girard, also castellan of Blaye, and who was titled "prince" in an 1106 charter. Girard's father was the first to carry the title, being called princeps Blaviensis as early as 1090. During his father's lifetime the suzerainty of Blaye was disputed between the counts of Poitou and the counts of Angoulême. Shortly after the succession of William VIII of Poitou, who had inherited it from his father, Blaye was taken by Wulgrin II of Angoulême, who probably vested Jaufre with it. According to one hypothesis, based on flimsy evidence, Wulgrin was Jaufre's father.

According to his legendary vida, or fictionalised biography, he was inspired to go on crusade upon hearing from returning pilgrims of the beauty of Countess Hodierna of Tripoli, and that she was his amor de lonh, his far-off love. The legend claims that he fell sick on the journey and was brought ashore in Tripoli a dying man. Countess Hodierna is said to have come down from her castle on hearing the news, and Rudel died in her arms. This romantic but unlikely story seems to have been derived from the enigmatic nature of Rudel's verse and his presumed death on the Second Crusade.

Seven of Rudel's poems have survived to the present day, four of them with music. His composition Lanquan li jorn is thought to be the model for the Minnesinger Walther von der Vogelweide's crusade song Allerest lebe ich mir werde (Palästinalied).

== Rudel in legend and literature ==
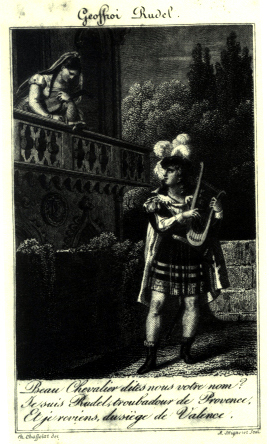
A Romantic portrayal of Jaufre singing to his love from the frontispiece of Étienne-François de Lantier's's play "Geoffroy Rudel, ou le Troubadour" (1825)

Nineteenth-century Romanticism found his legend irresistible. It was the subject of poems by Ludwig Uhland, Heinrich Heine, Robert Browning (Rudel to the Lady of Tripoli) and Giosué Carducci (Jaufré Rudel). Algernon Charles Swinburne returned several times to the story in his poetry, in The Triumph of Time, The Death of Rudel and the now-lost Rudel in Paradise (also titled The Golden House). In The Triumph of Time, he summarises the legend:

There lived a singer in France of old
By the tideless dolorous midland sea.
In a land of sand and ruin and gold
There shone one woman, and none but she.
And finding life for her love's sake fail,
Being fain to see her, he bade set sail,
Touched land, and saw her as life grew cold,
And praised God, seeing; and so died he.

Died, praising God for his gift and grace:
For she bowed down to him weeping, and said
"Live"; and her tears were shed on his face
Or ever the life in his face was shed.
The sharp tears fell through her hair, and stung
Once, and her close lips touched him and clung
Once, and grew one with his lips for a space;
And so drew back, and the man was dead.

Sir Nizamat Jung Bahadur, of Hyderabad, also wrote an epic poem on the subject, Rudel of Blaye, in 1926.

The French dramatist Edmond Rostand took the legend of Rudel and Hodierna as the basis for his 1895 verse drama La Princesse Lointaine, but reassigned the female lead from Hodierna to her jilted daughter Melisende, played by Sarah Bernhardt. However, there are older mentions of Rudel loving Melisende, such as Frederic Mistral's 1878 Provençal dictionary Lou Tresor dóu Felibrige which states (translation): "Mélisende, Mélissande or Mélissène, countess of Tripoli, daughter of Aimeri de Lusignan, loved by the troubadour Geoffroi Rudel".

More recently, Finnish composer Kaija Saariaho has written an opera about Rudel and Clémence (the name used for Hodierna) called L'amour de loin, with a libretto by Amin Maalouf, which was given its world premiere at the Salzburg Festival in 2000 and its US premiere at the Santa Fe Opera in 2002.
