= Kontostephanos =

Byzantine noble family

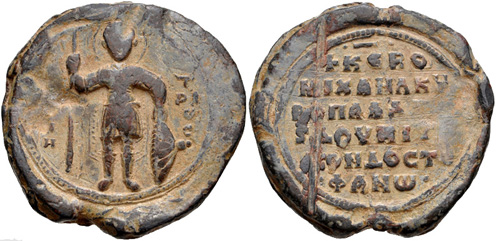
Seal of Michael Kontostephanos, duke of Antioch, 1055

Kontostephanos (Greek: Κοντοστέφανος), feminine form Kontostephanina (Κοντοστεφανίνα), was the name of an aristocratic Byzantine Greek family active in the 10th–15th centuries, which enjoyed great prominence in the 12th century through its intermarriage with the Komnenian dynasty.

== History ==
The progenitor of the family was Stephen, who served under Basil II (r. 976–1025) as Domestic of the Schools of the West, and was nicknamed "Kontostephanos" ("short Stephen") due to his height. Responsible to a large degree for Basil's humiliating defeat in the Battle of the Gates of Trajan against the Bulgarians, he was later involved in intrigues and beaten by the emperor.

=== Apogee under the Komnenoi ===
The family then disappears until 1080, when Isaac Kontostephanos was captured by the Seljuk Turks. The pansebastos sebastos Isaac Kontostephanos went on to serve through most of the reign of Alexios I Komnenos (r. 1081–1118), until his unsuccessful appointment as admiral (thalassokrator) in 1107/8. His branch of the family rose to great prominence in the Komnenian period, intermarrying with the Komnenoi, the Doukai, the Angeloi, and other aristocratic families. The family’s fame primarily derives from their service as military commanders. Alexander Kazhdan suggested they were largely uninvolved in the cultural production of their time. However, recent scholarship has argued that Anna Komnene’s hostile account of Isaac Kontostephanos in her Alexiad is due to efforts by the Kontostephanoi to patronize work promoting the family’s lineage. Similar efforts by the family to create a quasi-imperial narrative about themselves at the expense of the Komnenoi have been detected in the works of Niketas Choniates and John Kinnamos in regards to Andronikos Kontostephanos’ leadership on the 1167 campaign against Hungary. Isaac's brother Stephen appears only once, along with Isaac in the synod of Blachernae in 1095.

Isaac's son, the panhypersebastos Stephen Kontostephanos, married Anna Komnene, the second daughter of Emperor John II Komnenos (r. 1118–43). He became megas doux of the fleet and was killed at the siege of Corfu in 1149. Another son, Andronikos, married Theodora, a daughter of Adrianos Komnenos, younger brother of Emperor Alexios I Komnenos (r. 1081–1118). He led the campaign against Raymond of Antioch in 1144 and took part in the 1156 expedition to southern Italy. Another son of Isaac, John, became megas doux under Isaac II Angelos in 1186, while Alexios Kontostephanos, doux of Dyrrhachium in 1140, was probably also a son of Isaac.

Andronikos had several children: the pansebastos sebastos John, attested in the synods of 1157 and 1166, Alexios, and at least two more anonymous children. John in turn had three anonymous children mentioned in a monody by Constantine Manasses. Andronikos' brother Alexios had a number of children, but only a son Andronikos, who married Irene, the firstborn daughter of Alexios III Angelos (r. 1195–1203), is known. Isaac's other son, Stephen, had three sons, John, who was doux of Thessalonica in 1162, Alexios, a military commander active in the wars of Manuel I Komnenos (r. 1143–80) in Hungary, and governor of Crete in 1167, and Andronikos, likewise an eminent commander who became megas doux, as well as a daughter, Irene, who married Nikephoros Bryennios. Prior to his appointment as doux of Thessaloniki in 1162, John had twice been sent twice to the crusader states. In summer 1160 he commanded a force supplemented with crusader troops against the Sultanate of Rum. Immediately after a victory and the establishment of peace John was sent to Jerusalem to negotiate a marriage alliance, as the empress Bertha of Sulzbach had died. The eventual failure of that embassy sometime after 31 July 1161 and the escape of its participants was vividly recounted in the Hodopoirikon by the poet and historian Constantine Manasses who had accompanied John to the Kingdom of Jerusalem. This branch's descendants are better known: John's son Stephen was doux of Crete in 1193, and had a son John, known only from his seal. Andronikos had five sons, whose names are unattested; their existence is only mentioned in passing during Andronikos' failed conspiracy against Andronikos I Komnenos in 1182. A grandson Andronikos, who died as a monk, is known from a brief inscription.

Isaac's brother Stephen may have been the father of Theodore Kontostephanos, a commander under Manuel I Komnenos who fell in a campaign against Armenian Cilicia in 1152. A few other members of the family are attested, whose relation with Isaac and his descendants is unknown. Thus a kouropalates Michael Kontostephanos, known only from his seal, was approximately a contemporary of Isaac; a Nikephoros Kontostephanos was gambros (relative by marriage) of Alexios III and doux of Crete in 1197, succeeding in this post the aforementioned Stephen, and rose to the high rank of sebastokrator before his death. From seals, a panstratarches Kontostephanos, without first name, and a certain Eudokia Kontostephanina, are also known, both dated to the 12th century.

=== Later family members ===
After the fall of the Byzantine Empire to the Fourth Crusade in 1204, the family declined, although they remained members of the aristocracy and still appear as landholders and occupying posts in the imperial service.

A protosebastos Theodore Kontostephanos served as a general under the Nicaean emperor John III Doukas Vatatzes (r. 1222–54), and a member of the family was commander of the Garella fortress during the civil war of 1341–47, surrendering it to John VI Kantakouzenos in 1343. A George Kontostephanos was a landholder at Melenikon in 1309, and donated land to the Zographou Monastery; a Demetrios Komnenos Kontostephanos sold a house in Constantinople to Maria Palaiologina, and was married to a Theodora Doukaina Akropolitissa; while a nameless member of the family held large estates on Lemnos in ca. 1435/44. A Dionysios Kontostephanos was a monk in ca. 1365, a John Kontostephanos worked as a teacher, probably in Constantinople, in 1358, a Kaballarios Kontostephanos owned land in Constantinople in 1400, and a Nicholas Kontostephanos was active in the city at the same time. Stylianos, his son Lambertos, and the latter's children Tzovia and Stellio are recorded in Cyprus between 1398 and 1405. The last member of the family attested in Byzantine times was Phlamoules, who worked as a scribe ca. 1413/4–16.

== Sources ==
- Kazhdan, Alexander, ed. (1991). The Oxford Dictionary of Byzantium. Oxford and New York: Oxford University Press. ISBN 0-19-504652-8.
- McMahon, Lucas (2024). "Anna Komnene, the Kontostephanoi, and the Norman invasions of 1107–1108 and 1147–1149". Byzantinische Zeitschrift. 117 (3): 693–734. doi:10.1515/bz-2024-1170304.
- McMahon, Lucas (2025). "Manuel I Komnenos' policy towards the Sultanate of Rum and John Kontostephanos' embassies to Jerusalem, 1159–61". Crusades. 24 (1): 47–66. doi:10.1515/bz-2024-1170304.
- Schmidt, Tristan (2022). "Performing military leadership in Komnenian Byzantium: emperor Manuel I, his generals, and the Hungarian campaign of 1167". Dumbarton Oaks Papers. 76: 163–179.
- Trapp, Erich; Beyer, Hans-Veit; Walther, Rainer; Sturm-Schnabl, Katja; Kislinger, Ewald; Leontiadis, Ioannis; Kaplaneres, Sokrates (1976–1996). Prosopographisches Lexikon der Palaiologenzeit (in German). Vienna: Verlag der Österreichischen Akademie der Wissenschaften. ISBN 3-7001-3003-1.
- Varzos, Konstantinos (1984). Η Γενεαλογία των Κομνηνών [The Genealogy of the Komnenoi] (PDF) (in Greek). Vol. A1. Thessaloniki: Centre for Byzantine Studies, University of Thessaloniki.
- Varzos, Konstantinos (1984). Η Γενεαλογία των Κομνηνών [The Genealogy of the Komnenoi] (PDF) (in Greek). Vol. B. Thessaloniki: Centre for Byzantine Studies, University of Thessaloniki.
