= Isaac Kontostephanos =

Isaac Kontostephanos (Greek: Ἰσαάκ Κοντοστέφανος) was a Byzantine admiral during the reign of Emperor Alexios I Komnenos (r. 1081–1118) and who fought in the Byzantine–Norman wars. Much of what is known about Isaac’s military career is from Anna Komnene’s Alexiad where he is depicted as incompetent during the second Norman invasion of the Balkans. However, this image is reflective of Anna’s politics during the time of the composition of her work in the 1140s, specifically the Norman invasion of 1147-49 and internal competition with the Kontostephanoi.

== Biography ==
Isaac Kontostephanos first appears in 1080, during the imperial campaign against the rebel Nikephoros Melissenos. During this expedition, he fell off his horse and was nearly captured by Melissenos's Turkish allies, but was saved by George Palaiologos. He is next attested, holding the rank of protonobelissimos, at the 1094 synod of Blachernae.

By 1105, Kontostephanos had become a senior admiral (doux) in the Byzantine fleet. With the anticipated Norman invasion of Bohemond drawing near, Emperor Alexios I Komnenos (r. 1081–1118) named Kontostephanos megas doux (commander-in-chief of the imperial fleet) and sent him to Dyrrhachium to intercept the Normans. Anna alleges that Kontostephanos resolved to attack the city of Otranto in Italy, which was defended by Emma of Hauteville. This likely took place prior at the latest in summer 1106, and may have even been at the instigation of the citizens against the Norman garrison. The strategic significance of the Strait of Otranto to any force crossing the Adriatic, the early date of the assault, the number of notable commanders involved, and the presence of cavalry in Kontostephanos’ army all suggest that this was a centrally-planned and authorized expedition, with Anna later attempting to distance her father from its failure. Although his forces could have taken the city by storm, Kontostephanos allowed himself to be involved in negotiations with Emma, which she dragged on until Norman reinforcements arrived. Defeated in battle by the newly arrived Norman troops, Kontostephanos and his forces made an orderly withdrawal to the Albanian coast. The defense of Aulon was entrusted to Landulf while Kontostephanos operated out of Himara.

In October 1107 Bohemond crossed the straights and seized Aulon. Both Landulf and Kontostephanos blamed the other before Alexios for the success of the Norman crossing, and while Anna suggests that Kontostephanos was removed of command for this failure, it is clear from her narrative that many months, and possibly the better part of a year elapsed before losing his position to Marianos Maurokatakalon.

== Family ==
Isaac was the progenitor of the most important branch of the Kontostephanos family, which rose to great prominence in the 12th century as it intermarried with the Komnenoi, the Doukai, the Angeloi, and other aristocratic families. They served mostly as military commanders. Isaac had several children:

- the panhypersebastos Stephen Kontostephanos, married Anna Komnene, the second daughter of Emperor John II Komnenos (r. 1118–43), and became megas doux of the fleet until he was killed at the siege of Corfu in 1149.
- Andronikos Kontostephanos, married Theodora Komnene, a daughter of Adrianos Komnenos (archbishop of Bulgaria between 1139/43 - 1157 under the name John IV), who was son of sebastokrator Isaac Komnenos, elder brother of Alexios I. He led the campaign against Raymond of Antioch in 1144 and took part in the 1156 expedition to southern Italy.
- John Kontostephanos, became megas doux under Isaac II Angelos in 1186.
- Alexios Kontostephanos, doux of Dyrrhachium in 1140, was probably also a son of Isaac.

== Sources ==
- Gautier, Paul (1971). "Le synode des Blachernes (fin 1094). Etude prosopographique". Revue des études byzantines (in French). 29: 213–284. doi:10.3406/rebyz.1971.1445.
- Guilland, Rodolphe (1967). Recherches sur les institutions byzantines, Tome I (in French). Berlin: Akademie-Verlag.
- Kazhdan, Alexander, ed. (1991). The Oxford Dictionary of Byzantium. Oxford and New York: Oxford University Press. ISBN 0-19-504652-8.
- McMahon, Lucas (2024). "Anna Komnene, the Kontostephanoi, and the Norman invasions of 1107–1108 and 1147–1149". Byzantinische Zeitschrift. 117 (3): 693–734. doi:10.1515/bz-2024-1170304.
- Oldfield, Paul (2016). "Autonomy and identity in the cities of Norman Italy, c. 1050– c. 1200". History Compass. 14 (8): 370–379.
- Petrizzo, Francesca (2019). "The ancestry and kinship of Tancred, prince regent of Antioch". Medieval Prosopography. 34: 41–84.
- Schmidt, Tristan (2022). "Performing military leadership in Komnenian Byzantium: emperor Manuel I, his generals, and the Hungarian campaign of 1167". Dumbarton Oaks Papers. 76: 163–179.
- Skoulatos, Basile (1980). Les personnages byzantins de l'Alexiade: Analyse prosopographique et synthèse [The Byzantine Personalities of the Alexiad: Prosopographical Analysis and Synthesis] (in French). Louvain-la-Neuve and Louvain: Bureau du Recueil Collège Érasme and Éditions Nauwelaerts.
- Varzos, Konstantinos (1984). Η Γενεαλογία των Κομνηνών [The Genealogy of the Komnenoi] (PDF) (in Greek). Vol. A1. Thessaloniki: Centre for Byzantine Studies, University of Thessaloniki.
