= Baldwin of Antioch =

Frankish knight

Baldwin of Antioch (c. 1145 – September 17, 1176) was a Frankish knight and general in service of the Byzantine Empire during the Byzantine–Seljuk Wars. He was the son of Princess Constance of Antioch and Raymond of Poitiers. His brother-in-law was Byzantine Emperor Manuel I Komnenos. An ally of the Emperor in his battles against the Seljuk Turks, Baldwin was one of his most trusted advisors and the only one of Manuel's senior commanders "of Western origin".

Baldwin commanded the right wing of the Byzantine forces guarding the siege and baggage train, largely composed of Latin mercenaries, at the Battle of Myriokephalon on September 17, 1176. Upon approaching narrow Tzibritze Pass, the Seljuks launched an attack on Manuel's marching troops. Baldwin led a cavalry charge attempting to drive the Turks from the hills in a counterattack but was surrounded and killed together with all his men.

In Byzantium: The Decline and Fall (1996), English historian John Julius Norwich described the aftermath of Baldwin's death (taken from the Byzantine historian Choniates, whose comments are not always unbiased);

Had Manuel shown something of the same spirit, the day might have been saved; but at this of all moments his courage deserted him. In a hasty council of war he horrified his senior officers by suddenly announcing his intention of taking flight. The commanding general Andronicus Contostephanus made a strong protest, his words being echoed by a common soldier who, having overheard the discussion, bitterly reproached the Emperor for wishing to abandon an army whose loss was due entirely to his own imprudence. Manuel reluctantly agreed to remain; but his reputation was badly injured and was never fully to recover.
