= Andronikos Kontostephanos =

12th-century Byzantine military officer and politician

- Born: c. 1132/33
- Died: after 1183
- Military career
- Allegiance: Byzantine Empire
- Rank: megas doux
- Commands: Commander in chief of the Byzantine navy, general commanding a number of field armies
- Conflicts: Siege of Corfu; Byzantine–Hungarian wars; Battle of Sirmium; Siege of Damietta; Byzantine–Seljuk wars; Byzantine–Seljuk War (1158–1162); Byzantine–Seljuk war (1175–1179); Battle of Myriokephalon

Andronikos Komnenos Kontostephanos (Greek: Ἀνδρόνικος Κομνηνός Κοντοστέφανος; c. 1132/33 – after 1183), Latinized Andronicus Contostephanus, was a major figure in the Byzantine Empire during the reign of his uncle Manuel I Komnenos as a general, admiral, politician and a leading aristocrat.

== Background and family ==
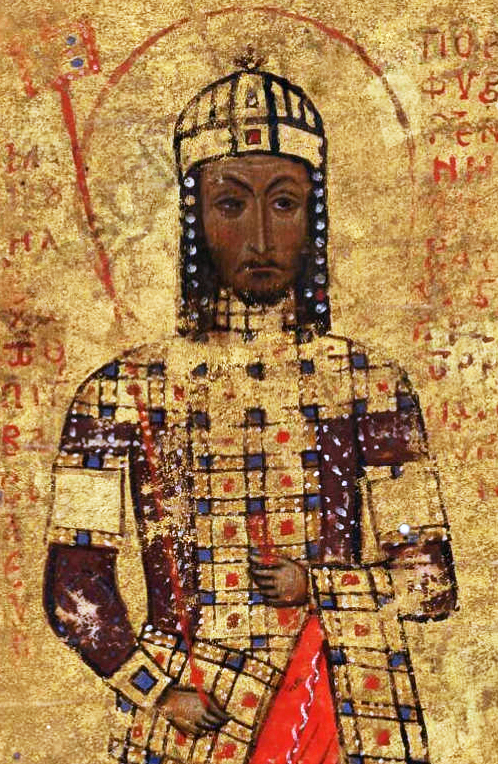
Emperor Manuel I Komnenos, uncle of Andronikos Kontostephanos

Born ca. 1132/33, Andronikos Kontostephanos was the third and youngest son of Stephen Kontostephanos, who held the title panhypersebastos and the rank of megas doux, and the 'purple-born' princess Anna Komnene, daughter of Emperor John II Komnenos (reigned 1118–43) and his empress Irene of Hungary; he was thus the nephew of Emperor Manuel I Komnenos (r. 1143–80). Andronikos had two older brothers, John and Alexios, and a sister, Irene. The Kontostephanoi were an aristocratic Byzantine family that rose to occupy a prominent place at the heart of Byzantine politics and power through their intermarrying with the imperial house of the Komnenoi. Andronikos himself is believed to have married, ca. 1150, an unnamed member of the Doukas family, another clan with imperial connections. The couple had at least five sons, and possibly daughters, although none is mentioned in the sources.

== Military career ==
Andronikos was the leading Byzantine military figure during the reign of his uncle, Emperor Manuel I Komnenos. Like his father he was appointed to the office of megas doux, the commander-in-chief of the Byzantine navy and governor of the provinces of Hellas, the Peloponnese and Crete. However, his greatest success was as a general rather than as an admiral. At some point, Andronikos was also appointed commander of the Varangian Guard.

Andronikos is first mentioned during the siege of Corfu in the winter of 1148/49. The Byzantine forces, led by his father Stephen, were attempting to expel the Normans of the Kingdom of Sicily who held the city. Andronikos' father was killed during the siege in early 1149, dying in his son's arms. The French scholar Rodolphe Guilland erroneously placed Andronikos in partial command of an expedition to Cilicia against Raymond of Poitiers in 1144/45, but the Belgian historian Henri Grégoire determined that this was a different person, namely his uncle and namesake Andronikos Kontostephanos.

=== Wars with Hungary and the Battle of Sirmium ===
Andronikos next appears, along with his brother Alexios, in the course of Manuel I's attempts to settle the dynastic succession in the Kingdom of Hungary in his favour after the death of King Géza II in 1161. Manuel supported his brothers, Ladislaus II and later Stephen IV, as his successors; both had spent time at the Byzantine court as exiles, and Stephen IV had even married Manuel's niece Maria Komnene (who was also the first cousin of the Kontostephanoi brothers). This was opposed by Géza's eldest son, Stephen III, who in 1162 expelled Stephen IV from the country. A prolonged conflict ensued, not only over the succession, but also over possession of Dalmatia and the region around Sirmium, disputed among the two realms. In 1164, Stephen IV invaded Hungary on his own account, but had to be rescued by an army under Andronikos. Soon after, he was poisoned by agents of his nephew.

Stephen IV's death transformed the conflict into a plain Byzantine–Hungarian war over Sirmium and Dalmatia; both areas were re-occupied by the Hungarians in 1166, after achieving major successes against the imperial forces. In response, Manuel I prepared a major counter-attack in 1167, appointing Andronikos, who months before had been named megas doux, commander-in-chief of the Byzantine navy, as the leader of the campaign, although he also gave him detailed instructions for the campaign. The Hungarian army, commanded by the palatine Denis, met the Byzantine army near Zemun on the feast day of St. Procopius, 8 July 1167. As the battle was about to begin, according to Niketas Choniates Andronikos received a message from Manuel, who forbade the battle to take place on that day due to unfavourable astrological omens. Andronikos ignored the order and kept it secret from his officers. The ensuing Battle of Sirmium resulted in "the most spectacular military victory [...] during Manuel's reign" (Paul Magdalino), thanks in large part to the crucial intervention of the reserves under Andronikos himself.

The victory sealed Byzantine control over the region around Sirmium, plus all of Bosnia, Dalmatia and the area south of the Krka River. Following the victory Manuel celebrated a triumphal entry into Constantinople with Andronikos Kontostephanos riding by his side.

=== Invasion of Egypt and the war with Venice ===
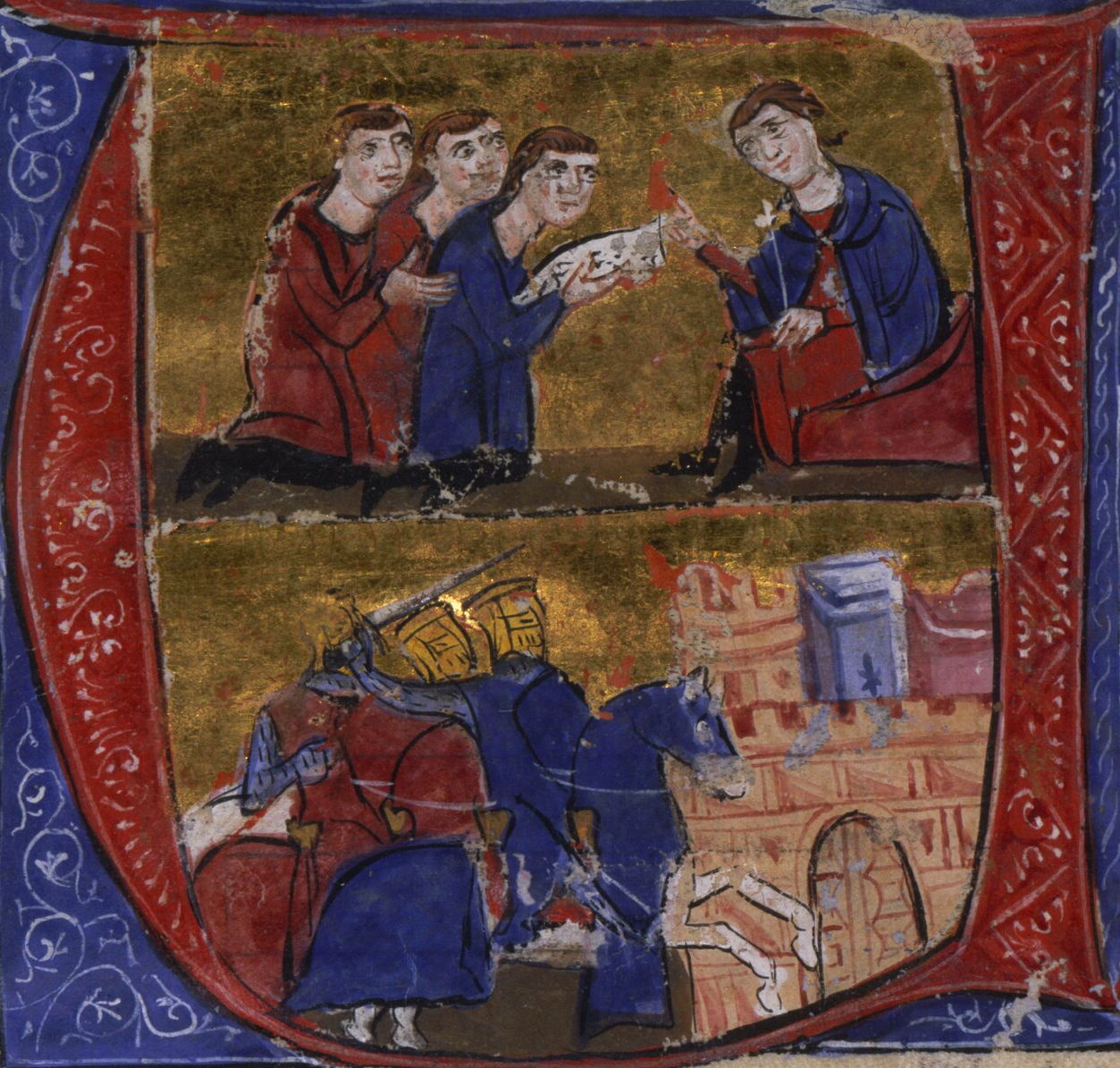
Upper register: Manuel and the envoys of Amalric, an embassy which resulted in the despatch of the Byzantine force under Kontostephanos to invade Egypt. Lower register: arrival of the crusaders in Egypt (William of Tyre's Historia).

In 1169, Andronikos was appointed commander of a fleet carrying a Byzantine army to invade Fatimid Egypt in alliance with the forces of Amalric, King of Jerusalem, in what was to be the last of a series of Crusader invasions of Egypt. The campaign, planned between the two Christian monarchs possibly since the marriage of Amalric with Manuel's great-niece Maria in 1167, would not only end in failure, but also lead to the establishment of the energetic Saladin in the place of the moribund Fatimid government as ruler of Egypt, in what would prove a major turning-point of the Crusades.

Manuel mobilized a large force, well beyond what he was obliged, according to the chronicler William of Tyre: 150 galleys, sixty horse-carriers and a dozen dromons specially constructed to carry siege engines. The fleet set sail from the port of Melibotos in the Hellespont on 8 July 1169. After defeating a small Egyptian scouting squadron near Cyprus, Kontostephanos arrived at Tyre and Acre in late September to find that Amalric had undertaken no preparations whatsoever. The delays on the part of the Crusaders infuriated Kontostephanos and sow mistrust among the ostensible allies. It was not until mid-October that the combined armies and fleets set forth, arriving at Damietta two weeks later. The Christians delayed three days in attacking the city, allowing Saladin to hastily move in troops and supplies. The siege was prosecuted with vigour on both sides, with Kontostephanos and his men constructing huge siege towers, but the besiegers were hampered by the growing mistrust between Byzantines and Crusaders, especially as the Byzantines' supplies dwindled, and Amalric refused to share his own with them but sold them at exorbitant prices. Exasperated by the dragging-on of the siege and the suffering of his troops, Kontostephanos once again disobeyed Manuel's instructions ordering him to obey Amalric in all things, and launched with his troops a final attack on the city. As the Byzantines were about to storm the walls, Amalric stopped them by announcing that a negotiated surrender of Damietta had just taken place. The discipline and cohesion of the Byzantine army almost instantly disintegrated after the news of the peace deal were announced, with troops burning the engines and boarding the ships in groups without order. Left with only six ships, Kontostephanos accompanied Amalric back to Palestine, returning home with part of his army by land through the crusader states of the Levant, while about half of the Byzantine ships that had sailed from Damietta was lost in a series of storms on its return journey, with the last ships arriving in their home ports only in late spring 1170.

On 12 March 1171, as the result of increasingly divergent interests between Byzantium and the Republic of Venice, and in an attempt to curtail the Venetians' growing economic presence in his realm, Manuel imprisoned all Venetians in the Empire and confiscated all of their property. Venice retaliated by outfitting a fleet of 120 ships under Doge Vitale II Michele. After attacking and capturing the Dalmatian cities under Byzantine control, the Venetians landed in the island of Euboea but were expelled by imperial troops, and then occupied the island of Chios to spend the winter. The Venetians sent envoys to negotiate, but Manuel allowed them to drag on until his own counterstroke, 150 ships under Kontostephanos' command, was ready. In the meantime, the Venetians suffered of disease on Chios. In April 1172, Kontostephanos set sail, but the Venetians were forewarned by the astrologer Aaron Isaakios, one of Manuel's confidantes, and hastily abandoned Chios. Kontostephanos pursued them, but while the Venetians sailed north, raiding the islands of Thasos, Lesbos and Skyros, he assumed they would sail back westwards, and directed his fleet to Cape Malea. Learning of the Venetians' true whereabouts, he turned back north, but although he managed to capture or sink several stragglers, he was unable to bring the main Venetian fleet to battle. Doge Vitale II returned his fleet to Venice on 28 May, but the losses suffered and the failure to gain any concrete objective led to his lynching by the angry mob.

=== Battle of Myriokephalon and second expedition against Egypt ===
Manuel attacked the Seljuk Sultanate of Rûm in 1176, with the intention of taking its capital, Konya, and destroying Turkish power in Anatolia. The Seljuk sultan Kilij Arslan II ambushed Manuel's impressively large army as it moved through the pass of Tivritze in mountainous border region between the two states. In the ensuing Battle of Myriokephalon parts of the Byzantine force were very badly mauled; however, Andronikos Kontostephanos managed to get his division, bringing up the rear, through the pass with few casualties. He is credited with having persuaded his uncle the emperor, whose confidence had been severely shaken, to remain with his troops following the defeat. Through his influence with the emperor he was instrumental in facilitating the peaceful withdrawal of the Byzantine forces.

The following year (1177), Andronikos led a fleet of 150 ships in another attempt to conquer Egypt, but he returned home after landing at Acre. He was dissuaded from continuing with the expedition by the refusal of Count Philip of Flanders, and many important nobles of the Kingdom of Jerusalem, to actively co-operate with the Byzantine force.

== Later life ==
Following the death of Manuel in 1180 the succession fell to his son Alexios II Komnenos. As Alexios was a child, power devolved on his mother, the empress Maria of Antioch. Her rule proved very unpopular, especially with the aristocracy who resented her Latin (Western) origins. When Manuel's cousin Andronikos Komnenos made a bid for power in 1182 the megas doux Andronikos Kontostephanos, together with the general Andronikos Angelos, played a key role in allowing his forces to enter Constantinople. However, once in power, Andronikos Komnenos proved that he had a tyrannical nature and a vehement desire to break the power and influence of the Byzantine aristocratic families. Kontostephanos and Angelos reacted by plotting to overthrow Andronikos. The plot was discovered and Andronikos Kontostephanos was captured, whilst Angelos escaped. The megas doux Andronikos and his four sons were punished with blinding.

Andronikos’ later fate is unknown.

== Legacy ==
Due to his exploits, Andronikos is one of the few figures given heroic status in the works of the Byzantine historian Niketas Choniates.
