= Siege of Damietta (1169) =

Fatimid victory over Crusaders in Egypt

- Part of Crusader invasions of Egypt
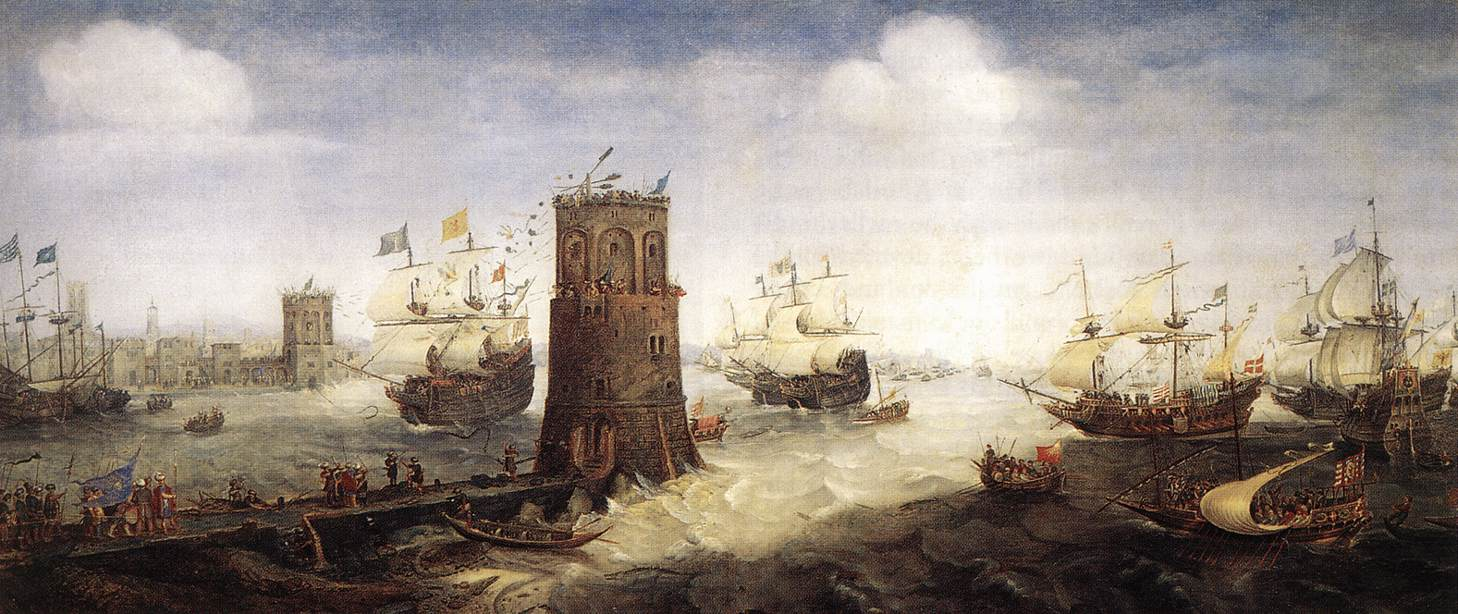
- Crusaders attack the tower of Damietta in a painting by Cornelis Claesz van Wieringen.
Date	27 October–16 December 1169
Location	Damietta, Lower Egypt
Result	Fatimid-Zengid victory

Belligerents
Fatimid Caliphate; Zengid dynasty	Kingdom of Jerusalem; Byzantine Empire

Commanders and leaders
Minister Saladin	Amalric I Andronikos Kontostephanos

Strength
Fatimid Caliphate : Unknown	Byzantine Empire : While some sources mention 200 ships, William of Tyre recorded 150 galleys, 60 horse-transports, and several large dromons carrying supplies and siege engines. Meanwhile, Saladin's letters provided an exaggerated figure of 1,000 ships. Kingdom of Jerusalem : Unknown

Casualties and losses
Fatimid Caliphate : Unknown	Byzantine Empire : During their retreat in December, the Byzantine fleet encountered severe winter storms, causing a large number of ships to sink. Kingdom of Jerusalem : The Crusader siege engines were completely burned and destroyed.

The Siege of Damietta (1169), which began on 27 October, is considered one of the largest battles of the Crusader invasions of Egypt.

== Background ==
Following a series of campaigns in Egypt, the commander Shirkuh died in March 1169. The position of vizier in the Fatimid Caliphate and the command of the Syrian forces in Egypt then passed to his nephew Saladin. Around the same time, an alliance was formed between the Crusaders of the Kingdom of Jerusalem and the Byzantine Empire to divide Egypt between themselves. The Byzantine Emperor Manuel I Komnenos suggested exploiting the situation while Saladin was busy suppressing a rebellion by Sudanese troops in Cairo on 23 August 1169. Taking advantage of this opportunity, the Crusaders and Byzantines quickly launched their campaign.

== Siege ==
King Amalric I of Jerusalem arrived at Damietta on 27 October 1169, with the Byzantine navy arriving slightly earlier. The Crusaders did not launch a full attack immediately after reaching the city. This delay gave Saladin and Nur ad-Din time to send reinforcements and supplies into Damietta. The city controlled river traffic using a strong defensive tower built in the middle of the Nile River. This tower was linked to the city by a large chain that blocked enemy ships from passing through.

The Crusader–Byzantine alliance began a traditional siege, using powerful siege weapons. The most important of these was a large seven story Frankish siege tower, along with catapults and mangonels. As the siege continued, the Byzantine navy ran out of supplies by late October. Relations between the allies became tense, as the Franks refused to share their food with the Byzantines, leading to serious disagreements.

Meanwhile, the Muslim defenders succeeded in burning several of the Crusader siege engines. With winter approaching and the defenders growing stronger, the Crusader–Byzantine forces were forced to end the siege and retreat after about 50 days.

== Aftermath ==
The siege was lifted between 4 and 13 December 1169. The Crusaders withdrew and returned to Ascalon, marking a complete failure of the joint Crusader–Byzantine campaign.

This victory confirmed Saladin’s control over Egypt. The country came fully under his authority, and after this success, he faced no further serious internal resistance in Cairo.

The defeat also had major consequences for the Crusaders. Their forces were severely weakened, and

they did not attempt another invasion of Egypt for the next fifty years. From this point on, the military initiative shifted strongly to the Muslim forces, placing Saladin in a powerful position to expand his influence and build on his victory.

== See also ==
- Crusader invasions of Egypt
- Caliph Al-Adid
- Crusades
