= Ralph of Domfront =

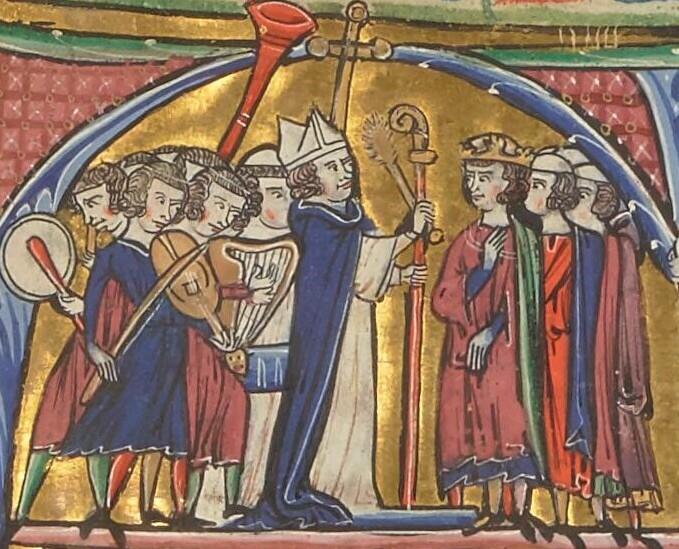
Patriarch Ralph welcomes Emperor John to Antioch

Ralph of Domfront (or Radulph, Latin: Radulfus; died c. 1146) was the archbishop of Mamistra and second Latin patriarch of Antioch (as Ralph I) from 1135 until 1140. William of Tyre describes him as "a military man, very magnificent and generous, a great favourite of the common people and with those of knightly birth."

== Early life and election ==
Born near the fortress of Domfront in southern Normandy at Lande Fricotine in La Baroche sous Lucé, Ralph received his early education in the military arts from the de Luci family, relatives of Richard de Lucy. He eventually took holy orders and was consecrated archbishop of Mamistra. The records of this church are few and Ralph only appears as archbishop in two documents late in the pontificate of his predecessor at Antioch, Bernard of Valence, the first Latin patriarch. William of Tyre, who wrote a chronicle of the Latin East, was a child when he met Ralph, but he wrote a description of his appearance and character:

The lord Ralph was a tall, handsome man. He squinted a little, but not excessively. He was not very well-educated, but was a fluent speaker and a cheerful companion and had good manners. Because he was very generous he gained the favour of the knights and of the burgesses. He was not good at keeping agreements and promises which he had made, and would say first one thing and then another. His was a complex character, cunning, cautious and discerning. . . He was called arrogant and conceited and this was true.

Bernard died in the late summer of 1135. The reigning Princess of Antioch was Constance, a child of seven, and so the incumbent bishops of the principality gathered uncanonically in Antioch to choose Bernard's successor. While they were meeting, the people of Antioch chose Ralph, who happened to be in the city although he was not attending the council. Although William of Tyre presents Ralph's election as the spontaneous action of the people, it was probably orchestrated by Ralph and some of his Norman compatriots. The king's bailiff, Rainald I Masoir, and the party that favored a marriage between Constance and Raymond of Poitiers have often been suspected by historians. At this enthronement, Ralph took Bernard's pallium from the altar and put it on. He explicitly rejected the supremacy of the Pope, saying that both Rome and Antioch were "the see of Peter and Antioch was the firstborn." Pope Innocent II took no action against Ralph out of fear that the latter would choose to recognise the Antipope Anacletus II instead.

== Marriage of Constance and Raymond ==
In the winter of 1135–36, Ralph supported the regency of Constance's mother, Alice. He could not, however, support her attempt at an alliance with the Byzantine Empire, since the Treaty of Devol of 1108 forbade the patriarch of Antioch from being a non-Greek Christian and the Byzantines would not recognise him as legitimate. When Raymond of Poitiers arrived before Antioch, Ralph forced him to sign an agreement whereby he would do homage to Ralph for the principality and in turn Ralph would marry him to Constance. Ralph then convinced Alice that Raymond was to marry her, whereupon she allowed him to enter Antioch and the patriarch married him to Constance. Alice then left the city, now under the control of Raymond and Ralph. Ralph's precedent for making the prince do homage to him as patriarch was the case of the first prince, Bohemond I, who in 1099 did homage to the papal legate, Dagobert of Pisa. According to William of Tyre, the power-sharing arrangement in Antioch did not succeed:

the lord patriarch in his customary way behaved more arrogantly, believing himself superior to the lord prince, and he was, indeed, deceived; for the prince thought it most shameul that he had exacted an oath of fealty from him and ... began to behave hostilely towards him and, dispensing with the oath he had taken, allied with his enemies.

Only open war with the Byzantine empire, whose efforts at alliance with Alice had been ruined by Ralph and Raymond's joint action, prevented the situation from devolving into civil war.

== Conflict with Byzantium ==
In the spring of 1137, the Byzantine emperor John II Comnenus attacked Prince Leo I of Cilicia, defeated him and in the summer invaded Antioch. In August, Raymond did homage to the emperor. Ralph, knowing how the emperor had expelled the Latin churchmen from Cilicia, appealed to Innocent II for help. Raymond responded by putting him in prison and, according to a Muslim source, Ibn al-Qalanisi, plundering his house. In March 1138 Innocent published an encyclical directed at Latin Christians serving in the Byzantine army, threatening them with damnation if they participated in an attack on Antioch.

In May 1138, John II returned to Antioch, where Ralph, released from prison, presided over the ceremony in the cathedral of St. Peter that marked the end of the Byzantine campaign. His change of fortune was probably the result of the papal encyclical, since John required Innocent's assistance in building up an anti-Sicilian alliance. Before John left, Count Joscelin II of Edessa incited a riot of Franks in the city, but full warfare between Frank and Byzantine was avoided.

== Dispute over revenues ==
Early in his episcopate, Ralph entered into conflict with an archdeacon named Lambert and another canon, Arnulf, over the apportionment of revenues. Ralph accused them both of conspiring to kill him, removed them from their benefices and imprisoned them. William of Tyre contrasts Lambert, "a learned man of upright life with little or no experience in worldly affairs", with Arnulf, "learned and worldly-wise", who was a nobleman from Calabria with connexions to the king of Sicily. After Raymond's marriage to Constance, he released the imprisoned priests. In the summer of 1138 he encouraged them to appeal to Rome and forced Ralph to go also and defend himself. When Ralph landed at Brindisi, he was immediately arrested by men sent by King Roger II of Sicily, and placed in the custody of Arnulf's family while awaiting a summons. In the end he was able to convince Roger that he was at odds with Raymond—Roger's real enemy—and allowed to go on to Rome.

At Rome, Ralph received the pallium from Innocent II. The consistory found the evidence insufficient to proceed and sent a legate to Antioch to resolve the dispute. On his return journey, Ralph visited the Sicilian court and was accompanied by a Sicilian fleet on his return to Antioch in the fall of 1138. Raymond refused him entry and he had to stay in one of the monasteries on the Black Mountain outside Antioch. Joscelin of Edessa, who had started the riot in Antioch after Raymond and the emperor made peace, then invited Ralph to Edessa, where he spent the winter of 1138–39. In the spring, Raymond invited Ralph back, and the latter returned accompanied by the three archbishops of the county of Edessa. The papal legate, the archbishop Peter, arrived soon after, but on 25 May, before reaching Antioch, he died at Acre. With the death of the legate and the victory of Roger II over Innocent II at the battle of Mignano on 22 July the balance of power had swung in Ralph's favour. Lambert made his peace and was re-instated, but Arnulf returned to Rome to seek a new legate. In the fall, Innocent appointed Alberic of Ostia to hear the case.

== Deposition ==
Although Ralph was permitted to stay in Antioch while awaiting the arrival of Alberic, it appears that Raymond was exercising some of the juridical authority of the patriarchate contrary to canon law. In February 1140, the prince and the Antiochene Haut Cour (high court) heard a claim launched by the prior and seneschal of the Church of the Holy Sepulchre on some property which had been held by the monastery of Saint Paul's in Antioch since the First Crusade. Abbot Robert disputed the jurisdiction of the court, which found in favour of the Sepulchre.

Alberic arrived in the East in June 1140. After accompanying Raymond on the summer military campaign, he summoned all the bishops of the patriarchates of Antioch and Jerusalem to a synod at Antioch on 30 November. The meeting lasted until 2 December and was attended by the patriarch of Jerusalem, the archbishops of Apamea, Caesarea, Cyrrhus, Hierapolis, Nazareth, Tarsus and Tyre, and the bishops of Beirut, Bethlehem, Jabala, Latakia and Sidon. The clergy of the County of Tripoli did not show, probably forbidden by their count, and only the Edessan archbishops (Hierapolis and Cyrrhus) and that of Apamea sided with Ralph.

Ralph was charged with an uncanonical election, simony and fornication. He refused to attend the synod, and Archbishop Serlo of Apamea questioned its authority to proceed in the absence of the defendant, perhaps on the grounds that he had not been duly summoned. Serlo was deposed and defrocked for his audacity. The people of Antioch, according to William of Tyre, supported the patriarch and would have expelled the legate had they not feared the Raymond's power. After his deposition, Ralph was placed in irons and incarcerated in the monastery of Saint Symeon on the Black Mountain.

== Escape and death ==
According to William of Tyre, Ralph eventually escaped his prison and made his way to Rome. There he appealed his deposition (probably to Lucius II) and was re-instated as patriarch. As he was preparing to return, he was poisoned. These events probably occurred around 1144. Bishop Otto of Freising records how, when he visited Rome in 1145, he met the bishop of Jabala, Hugh, a long-time opponent of Ralph's, who was there to complain about the patriarch. Since the only patriarch about whom Hugh would have had a complaint is Ralph, it is likely that he was in Rome to protest the latter's re-instatement.

Ralph's death must have occurred by 1149, when his successor, Aimery of Limoges, who had exercised the patriarchate since at least 1143, was finally recognised as the legal patriarch. Summing up Ralph's life, William of Tyre remarks, "He was like Marius: he experienced in his own life the extremes of good and ill fortune."

== Sources ==
- Barber, Malcolm (2012). The Crusader States. Yale University Press.
- Hamilton, Bernard (1984). "Ralph of Domfront, Patriarch of Antioch (1135–40)". Nottingham Medieval Studies. 28: 1–21. doi:10.1484/J.NMS.3.115.
