= Philippa of Antioch =

Lady of Toron
- Tenure: c.1166–1178
- Born: 1148; Antioch (modern-day Antakya, Hatay, Turkey)
- Died: 1178 (aged 29–30)
- Burial: St Marie, Josaphat
- Spouse: Humphrey II of Toron
- House: Poitiers
- Father: Raymond of Poitiers
- Mother: Constance of Antioch

Philippa of Antioch (1148 – 1178) was a noblewoman from the Latin East.

Philippa was the daughter of Constance of Antioch and Raymond of Poitiers. Philippa's siblings were Bohemond III of Antioch and Maria of Antioch. In 1149, her father died in the Battle of Inab, and her mother remarried in 1153 to Raynald of Châtillon. From this marriage at least one daughter was born, Agnes.

Philippa was the mistress of Andronikos Komnenos in 1166–67. After she was abandoned by Andronikos, Philippa married Humphrey II of Toron. She had no children. Philippa died in 1178. She was buried at the church of St. Mary in the Valley of Josaphat.

== Sources ==
- Hamilton, Bernard; Jotischky, Andrew (2020). Latin and Greek Monasticism in the Crusader States. Cambridge University Press.
- Hatzaki, Myrto (2009). Beauty and the Male Body in Byzantium: Perceptions and Representations in Art and Text. Springer.
- Hodgson, Natasha R. (2007). Women, Crusading and the Holy Land in Historical Narrative. The Boydell Press.
- Mielke, Christopher (2021). The Archaeology and Material Culture of Queenship in Medieval Hungary, 1000–1395. Palgrave Macmillan.
- Runciman, Steven (1999). A History of the Crusades. Vol. 2: The Kingdom of Jerusalem and the Frankish East, 1100–1187. Cambridge University Press.
- Tyerman, Christopher (2006). God's War: A New History of the Crusades. Harvard University Press.
