= Constance of Antioch =

Princess of Antioch from 1130 to 1163

Constance

Princess of Antioch
- Reign: 1130 – 1163
- Predecessor: Bohemond II
- Successor: Bohemond III
- Alongside: Raymond (1136–1149); Raynald (1153–1160 or 1161)
- Regents: See list: Alice of Jerusalem Baldwin II of Jerusalem Fulk of Anjou Baldwin III of Jerusalem
- Born: c. 1128
- Died: 1163 (aged 34–35)
- Spouse: Raymond of Poitiers; Raynald of Châtillon
- Issue: Bohemond III, Prince of Antioch; Maria, Byzantine Empress; Philippa, Lady of Toron; Baldwin of Antioch; Agnes, Queen of Hungary
- House: Hauteville
- Father: Bohemond II, Prince of Antioch
- Mother: Alice of Jerusalem
- Religion: Catholicism

Constance of Hauteville (c. 1128–1163) was the ruling princess of Antioch from 1130 to 1163. She succeeded her father, Bohemond II, at the age of two after he fell in battle, although his cousin Roger II of Sicily laid claim to Antioch. Constance's mother Alice, daughter of Baldwin II of Jerusalem, assumed the regency, but the Antiochene noblemen replaced her with her father Baldwin. After Baldwin died in 1131, Alice again tried to take control of the government, but the Antiochene barons acknowledged the right of her brother-in-law Fulk of Anjou to rule as regent for Constance.

Constance was given in marriage to Raymond of Poitiers in 1136. During the subsequent years, Raymond ruled Antioch while Constance gave birth to four children. After Raymond was murdered after a battle in 1149, Constance's cousin Baldwin III of Jerusalem assumed the regency. He tried to persuade her to remarry, but she did not accept his candidates. She also refused to marry a middle-aged relative of the Byzantine Emperor Manuel I Komnenus. Finally, she found a love interest and was married to Raynald of Châtillon, a knight from France, in 1153.

After her second husband fell into captivity around 1160–1161, Constance wanted to rule Antioch alone, but Baldwin III of Jerusalem declared her fifteen-year-old son, Bohemond III, the lawful prince. Constance disregarded this declaration and took control of the administration of the principality with the assistance of Emperor Manuel. Shortly before her death in 1163, the Antiochene barons dethroned her in favor of her son.

== Early life ==
Born in 1128, Constance was the only child of Prince Bohemond II of Antioch and Princess Alice, the second daughter of King Baldwin II of Jerusalem. She was named after Bohemond's mother, Constance of France. Bohemond was killed in a battle at the Ceyhan River in February 1130. Alice then assumed the regency for Constance. According to rumors spreading in Antioch, Alice was planning to send Constance to a monastery or to marry her off to a commoner. Bohemond's cousin Roger II of Sicily regarded himself as Bohemond's lawful successor because he was the senior member of the House of Hauteville.

The Antiochene noblemen sent envoys to Baldwin II, urging him to come to the principality, but Alice decided to resist her father. The 12th-century historian, William of Tyre, also accused her of seeking assistance from Imad ad-Din Zengi, atabeg of Aleppo. According to William of Tyre's account, her envoys were captured by Baldwin II's soldiers, who had meanwhile reached Antioch. Before long, Alice was forced to beg for mercy from her father. He removed Alice from the regency, ordering her to leave Antioch.

== Reign ==
=== Childhood ===
The crusader states around 1135

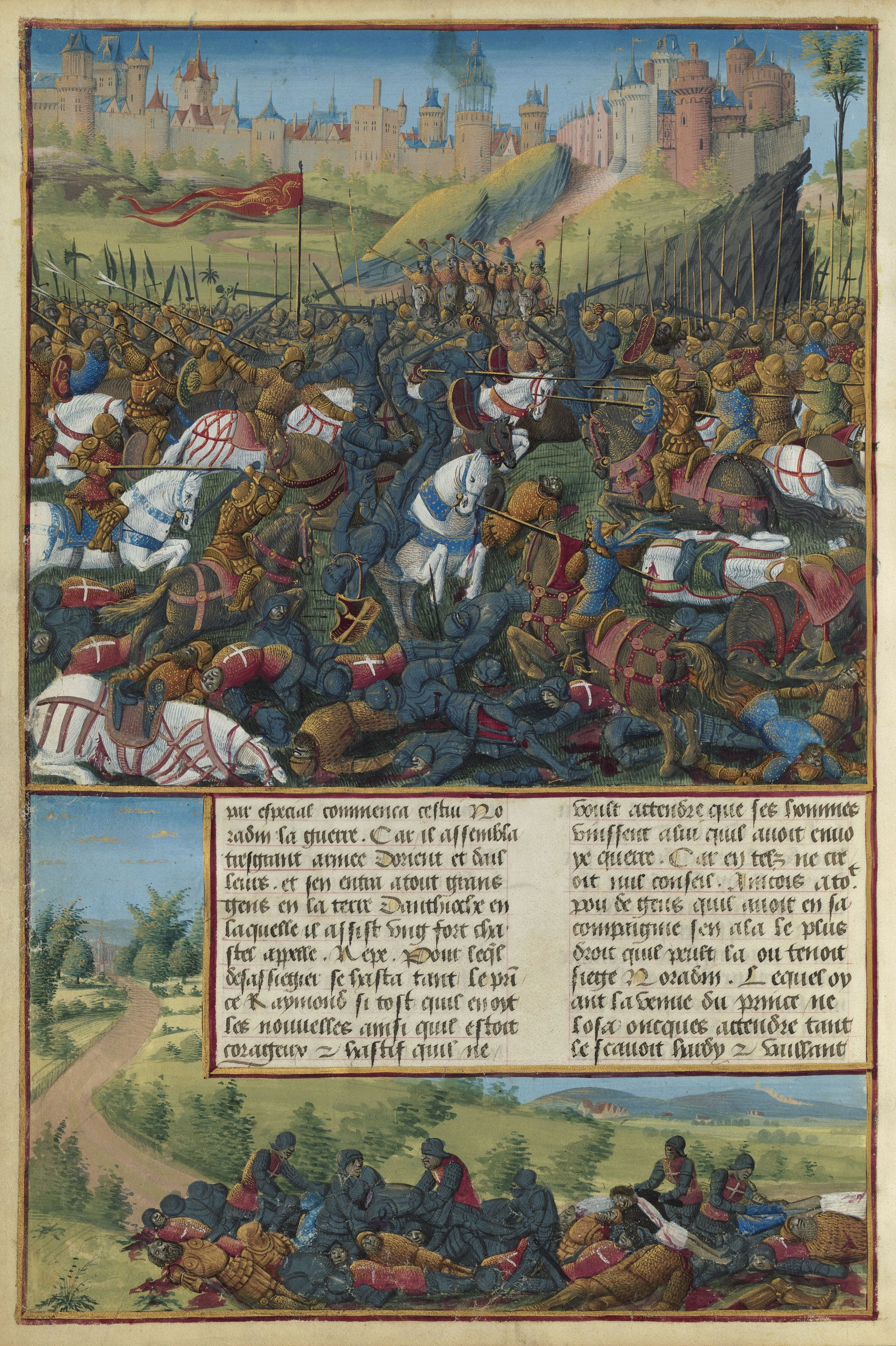
Death of Constance's first husband, Raymond of Poitiers, in the Battle of Inab (illustration from the Passages d'outremer).

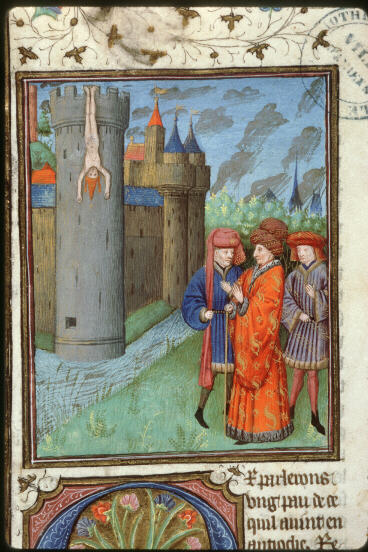
Torture of Aimery of Limoges, Latin Patriarch of Antioch, by Constance's second husband, Raynald of Châtillon

The Antiochene noblemen acknowledged Baldwin II as regent, swearing fealty to him and Constance. He made Count Joscelin I of Edessa her guardian to rule the principality until her marriage. Baldwin II died on August 21, 1131, and Joscelin I died a week later.

Alice again laid claim to the regency. However, most Antiochene lords remained hostile to the idea of a female ruler and sent envoys to her brother-in-law Fulk of Anjou, the new king of Jerusalem. Alice made an alliance with Counts Joscelin II of Edessa and Pons of Tripoli in early 1132. Fulk had to travel to Antioch by sea because Pons did not allow him to march through the County of Tripoli. Fulk landed at St. Symeon where the Antiochene barons acknowledged him as regent. He appointed Rainald I Masoir, constable of Antioch, to administer the principality.

Fulk returned to Antioch when Zengi dispatched Sawar, governor of Aleppo, to invade the principality in 1132 or 1133. After defeating the invaders, Fulk entered Antioch. Since the principality needed a firm government, the Antiochene noblemen approached Fulk to select a husband for Constance. He chose Raymond of Poitiers, the younger son of Duke William IX of Aquitaine. He did not announce his decision in public because he wanted to prevent Alice and Roger II of Sicily from intervening.

Queen Melisende, Alice’s sister and Fulk's wife, persuaded Fulk to allow Alice to return to Antioch in 1135. Alice wanted to tighten the relationship of the principality and the Byzantine Empire; therefore, she offered Constance's hand to Manuel, a son of Emperor John II Komnenos. To prevent the Byzantine marriage, Fulk sent his envoy to France to Raymond of Poitiers to urge him to come to Antioch, which he did, traveling in disguise, because Roger II of Sicily wanted to capture him in southern Italy.

=== First marriage ===
Raymond of Poitiers arrived at Antioch in April 1136. Ralph of Domfront, Latin Patriarch of Antioch, made Alice believe that Raymond came to Antioch to marry her instead of her eight-year-old daughter. However, Constance was kidnapped from the palace, and Ralph of Domfront blessed her marriage to Raymond in the cathedral. With the marriage, Raymond became the ruler of the principality, and Alice retired to Lattakieh.

In early 1147 Roger II of Sicily extended an offer to Louis VII of France to transport the French crusaders to the Holy Land during the Second Crusade. Fearing that Roger only wanted to assert his claim to Antioch, Louis VII and his wife Eleanor of Aquitaine (niece of Raymond of Poitiers) declined. Louis and his crusaders came to the principality in March 1148. Before long, rumors spread among the crusaders about a love affair between Raymond and Eleanor. The crusaders tried to convince her husband to launch a campaign against Aleppo, the capital of Nur ad-Din, but Louis VII decided to leave Antioch to Jerusalem, forcing Eleanor to accompany him.

=== Widowhood ===
Raymond was killed in the Battle of Inab during an expedition against Nur ad-Din Zangi on June 29, 1149. Since Raymond and Constance's four children were still underage, there was no one to "perform the duties of a prince and raise the people from despair", according to William of Tyre. Nur ad-Din invaded the principality and seized all Antiochene territories to the east of the Orontes River. Aimery of Limoges, Latin Patriarch of Antioch, directed the defense, but most noblemen preferred a secular ruler. After learning of Raymond's fate, Constance's cousin, Baldwin III of Jerusalem, hurried to Antioch and assumed the regency. He also concluded a truce with Nur ad-Din.

Baldwin III returned to Antioch in summer 1150. He wanted to persuade Constance to remarry, proposing three candidates (Yves of Soissons, Walter of Saint Omer, and Ralph of Merle), but she declined. Urged by Baldwin III, Constance went to Tripoli in early 1152 to meet him and her two aunts, Melisende and Hodierna. Constance's aunts tried to persuade her to choose among the three candidates, but she returned to Antioch without making a promise to remarry. According to William of Tyre, Patriarch Aimery convinced Constance to resist, because he wanted to control the government of the principality. The Byzantine Emperor Manuel I Komnenos sent his widowed brother-in-law, the middle-aged John Rogerios Dalassenos, to Antioch to marry Constance. However, because of his age, she "regarded him with displeasure", according to the contemporaneous John Kinnamos, and refused to marry him.

Historian Steven Runciman says that Constance may have refused the candidates proposed by Baldwin III and Manuel I because she had met Raynald of Châtillon, a knight from France. Even though William of Tyre described Raynald as a "knight of common sort", Constance decided to marry Raynald. Their betrothal was kept secret because Constance wanted to obtain Baldwin III's permission for the marriage.

=== Second marriage ===
After Baldwin sanctioned the marriage, Constance and Raynald married in early 1153. Raynald took charge of the administration of the principality. However, he was unpopular because his subjects regarded him as an upstart. His frequent attempts to raise funds brought him into conflict with Patriarch Aimery and Emperor Manuel I during the subsequent years. The emperor forced Raynald to pay homage to him in the spring of 1159. Raynald was captured and imprisoned by Majd al-Din, governor of Aleppo, during a plundering raid in November 1160 or 1161.

After her husband fell into captivity, Constance announced her intention to administer the principality, but most Antiochene noblemen preferred a male ruler. Baldwin III of Jerusalem hurried to Antioch and declared Constance's fifteen-year-old son, Bohemond III, the lawful prince, charging Patriarch Aimery with the administration of the principality. Constance did not accept Baldwin's decision and protested against it to Emperor Manuel.

Manuel dispatched his nephew, Alexios Bryennios Komnenos, and John Kamateros to Antioch to begin negotiations about his marriage to Constance's daughter, Maria. The marriage contract was signed and the emperor's delegates confirmed Constance's position as the ruler of the principality. Baldwin III, who came to Antioch to meet the imperial envoys, did not protest.

Constance's son, Bohemond, reached the age of majority in 1163. To strengthen her position against her son, Constance sought assistance from Constantine Kalamanos, Byzantine governor of Cilicia. However, the Antiochene barons made an alliance with Thoros II of Cilician Armenia and forced her to leave Antioch. After Constance's removal, Bohemond III took control of the principality. Before long, Constance died, probably in Lattakieh or Byblos, according to Steven Runciman.

== Family ==
Constance's first husband, Raymond of Poitiers, was the second son of Duke William IX of Aquitaine and Countess Philippa of Toulouse. He was born in 1114. According to William of Tyre, Constance was left with "two sons and as many daughters still underage" when her husband died in 1149. Their elder son, Bohemond III, was five at the time of Raymond's death. He seized Antioch from his mother in 1163. Constance and Raymond's daughter Maria, famed for her beauty, married the Byzantine Emperor Manuel I Komnenos in 1161. Another daughter, Philippa, was given in marriage to Humphrey II of Toron in the late 1160s.

Whether the father of Constance's second son, Baldwin, was Raymond of Poitiers or Raynald of Châtillon cannot be determined with certainty. Baldwin died fighting at the head of a Byzantine cavalry regiment in the Battle of Myriokephalon on September 17, 1176. It is certain that Raynald fathered Agnes, who married Béla III of Hungary. Raynald and Constance's second daughter, Alice, became the third wife of Azzo VI of Este in 1204.

Constance's close family and relationship with the rulers of Sicily and the Crusader states

Tancred of Hauteville | Fressenda
Isabella of Montlhéry | Melisende of Montlhéry | Hugh I of Rethel | Alberada of Buonalbergo | Robert Guiscard | Roger I of Sicily
Joscelin I of Edessa | Baldwin II of Jerusalem | Morphia of Melitene | Constance of France | Bohemond I of Antioch | Roger II of Sicily
Joscelin II of Edessa | Melisende of Jerusalem | Fulk V of Anjou | Alice of Jerusalem | Bohemond II of Antioch | Hodierna of Jerusalem | Pons of Tripoli
Baldwin III of Jerusalem | Amalric of Jerusalem | Raymond of Poitiers | Constance of Antioch | Raynald of Châtillon | Raymond III of Tripoli
Bohemond III of Antioch | Maria of Antioch (m. Manuel I Komnenos) | Philippa of Antioch (m. Humphrey II of Toron) | Baldwin | Agnes of Antioch (m. Béla III of Hungary)

== Sources ==
- Baldwin, Marsall W. (1969) [1955]. "The Latin States under Baldwin III and Amalric I, 1143–1174". In Setton, Kenneth M.; Baldwin, Marshall W. (eds.). A History of the Crusades, Volume I: The First Hundred Years. Vol. 1 (Second ed.). Madison, Milwaukee, and London: University of Wisconsin Press. pp. 528–561. ISBN 0-299-04834-9.
- Barber, Malcolm (2012). The Crusader States. Yale University Press. ISBN 978-0-300-11312-9.
- Buck, Andrew D. (2017). The Principality of Antioch and its Frontiers in the Twelfth Century. The Boydell Press. ISBN 978-1-78327-173-3.
- Chiappini, Luciano (2001). Gli Estensi: Mille anni di storia [The Este: A Thousand Years of History] (in Italian). Corbo Editore. ISBN 88-8269-029-6.
- Dunbabin, Jean (2000). France in the Making, 843–1180. Oxford University Press. ISBN 0-19-820846-4.
- Garland, Lynda (1999). Byzantine Empresses: Women and Power in Byzantium, AD 527–1204. Routledge. ISBN 978-0-415-61944-8.
- Hamilton, Bernard (2000). The Leper King and His Heirs: Baldwin IV and the Crusader Kingdom of Jerusalem. Cambridge University Press. ISBN 978-0-521-64187-6.
- Hodgson, Natasha R. (2007). Woman, Crusading and the Holy Land in Historical Narrative. The Boydell Press. ISBN 978-1-84383-332-1.
- Meade, Marion (1991). Eleanor of Aquitane: A Biography. Penguin Books. ISBN 0-14-015338-1.
- Murray, Alan W. (2016). "Constance, Princess of Antioch (1130–1164), ancestry, marriages and family". In van Houts, Elisabeth (ed.). Anglo–Norman Studies: XXXVIII. Proceedings of the Battle Conference 2015. The Boydell Press. pp. 81–95. ISBN 978-1-78327-101-6.
- Nicholson, Robet L. (1969). "The Growth of the Latin States, 1118–1144". In Setton, Kenneth M.; Baldwin, Marshall W. (eds.). A History of the Crusades, Volume I: The First Hundred Years. The University of Wisconsin Press. pp. 528–561. ISBN 0-299-04844-6.
- Norwich, John Julius (1992). The Normans in Sicily. Penguin Books. ISBN 978-0-14-015212-8.
- Runciman, Steven (1989). A History of the Crusades, Volume II: The Kingdom of Jerusalem and the Frankish East, 1100–1187. Cambridge University Press. ISBN 0-521-06163-6.

Constance of Antioch House of Hauteville Born: 1128 Died: 1163
Regnal titles
| Preceded by Bohemond II | Princess of Antioch; 1130–1163 with Raymond (1136-1149); Raynald (1153-1160) | Succeeded by Bohemond III |
