= Archdiocese of Mopsuestia =

Former Latin Catholic diocese and modern titular see

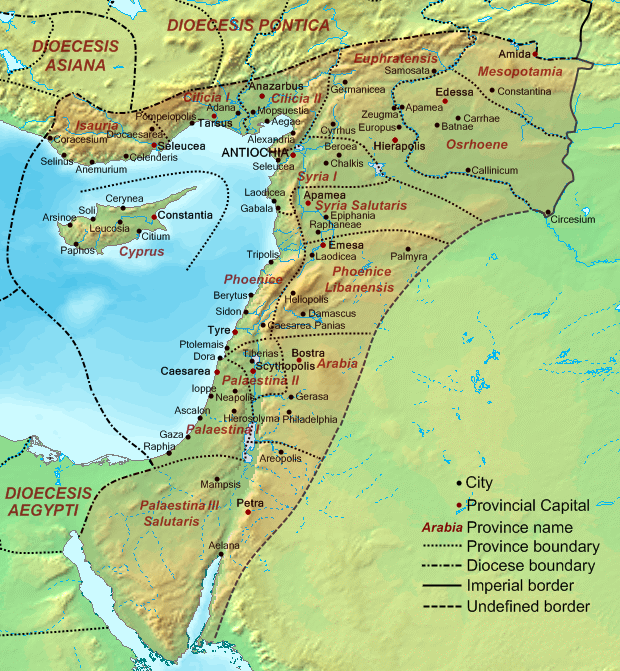
The Diocese of the East around 400, showing the province of Cilicia II, corresponding to the ecclesiastical diocese with its seat at Mopsuestia

The Archdiocese of Mopsuestia is a historical archbishopric of the Patriarchate of Antioch with its seat (cathedral) at Mopsuestia (the Mamistra of the Middle Ages and Misis of the Ottoman Empire). It remains a titular see (Latin: Archidioecesis Mopsuestena or Mamistrensis) of the Roman Catholic Church.

== History ==
The diocese of Mopsuestia originally corresponded to the Roman province of Cilicia Secunda, part of the Diocese of the East. It was originally a suffragan of the archdiocese of Anazarbus. In the sixth century, it was raised to metropolitan (archiepiscopal) rank, but without suffragans of its own, as recorded in the tenth-century Notitiae Episcopatuum. Its most famous bishop during the early period was Theodore II (392–428), founder of the theological school of Antioch whose works were condemned at the Second Council of Constantinople in 553.

With the early Muslim conquests in the seventh century the archdiocese falls into obscurity. It was re-founded in December 1099 during the First Crusade. A series of Latin bishops were appointed until the fourteenth century, when the rise of the Ottoman Empire made it impossible for the bishops to maintain their residence in the city. Despite the continuance of the Genoese colony there, the archbishopric disappeared. The most famous incumbent during the Latin period was Ralph of Domfront, who in 1135 was transferred to the Patriarchate of Antioch. A series of late bishops—James, Peter and Thomas—were Dominicans. The last Latin archbishop, Volcardus, was an Augustinian. He never got to his see on account of the Mameluke threat.

Between the ninth and twelfth centuries there was also a diocese of the Church of the East with its seat in Mopsuestia. It was a suffragan of the archdiocese of Damascus. It is first recorded in the chronicle of Eliya of Damascus in 893. It probably ceased to exist in the twelfth century if not earlier.

Mamistra was revived as a titular see for Manoel da Silva Gomes on 11 April 1911. These titulars were auxiliary bishops in other dioceses. From 1923 until 1926 the titular archbishop was Gustave-Charles-Marie Mutel, emeritus apostolic vicar for Korea. The titular see has been vacant since the death of the last incumbent, Joseph Gotthardt, apostolic vicar for South West Africa, on 3 August 1963.

== List of bishops ==
=== Greek (Antiochene) rite ===
- Theodore I (fl. 269)
- Macedonius (fl. 325–51)
- Saint Auxentius I (fl. 359–60)
- Protogenes
- Zosimus I
- Olympius (fl. 381)
- Cyril
- Theodore II (from c. 392, died 428)
- Meletius (fl. 431–34)
- Comatius (or Thomas [I]) (fl. 445–49)
- Bassianus (fl. 451)
- John
- Auxentius II
- Palatinus
- Julian (until c. 490), expelled
- Theodore III
- James
- Zosimus II
- Cosmas (fl. 550)

=== Latin rite ===
- Bartholomew (fl. 1099–1108)
- Ralph (until 1135), transferred
- Gaudin (fl. 1140)
- anonymous transferred to Tarsus
- John (from 1215)
- anonymous mentioned in 1224
- anonymous mentioned in 1238
- William (fl. 1246)
- Constantine (fl. 1306)
- James
- Peter of Adria
- Thomas [II] (from 2 July 1320)
- Stephen (fl. 1332)
- Volcardus (from 7 August 1345)
- vacant
- Manoel da Silva Gomes (11 April 1911 – 16 September 1912), auxiliary of Ceará until named full bishop
- Santiago Richardo Vilanova y Meléndez (1 August 1913 – 15 January 1915), auxiliary of San Salvador until named bishop of Santa Ana
- Gustave-Charles-Marie Mutel (31 January 1923 – 11 January 1926), member of the Paris Foreign Missions Society, auxiliary of Seoul until named titular archbishop of Ratiaria
- Joseph Gotthardt (18 May 1926 – 3 August 1963), member of the Missionary Oblates of Mary Immaculate, auxiliary of Windhoek

== Sources ==
- Du Cange, Charles (1869). Les familles d'outre-mer. Paris. pp. 770–71.
- Le Quien, Michel (1740). Oriens Christianus, in quatuor Patriarchatus digestus: quo exhibentur ecclesiæ, patriarchæ, cæterique præsules totius Orientis. Tomus secundus, in quo Illyricum Orientale ad Patriarchatum Constantinopolitanum pertinens, Patriarchatus Alexandrinus & Antiochenus, magnæque Chaldæorum & Jacobitarum Diœceses exponuntur (in Latin). Paris: Ex Typographia Regia. cols. 889–894. OCLC 955922747.
- Wilmshurst, David (2011). The Martyred Church: A History of the Church of the East. East and West Publishing.
