= Archbishopric of Justiniana Prima =

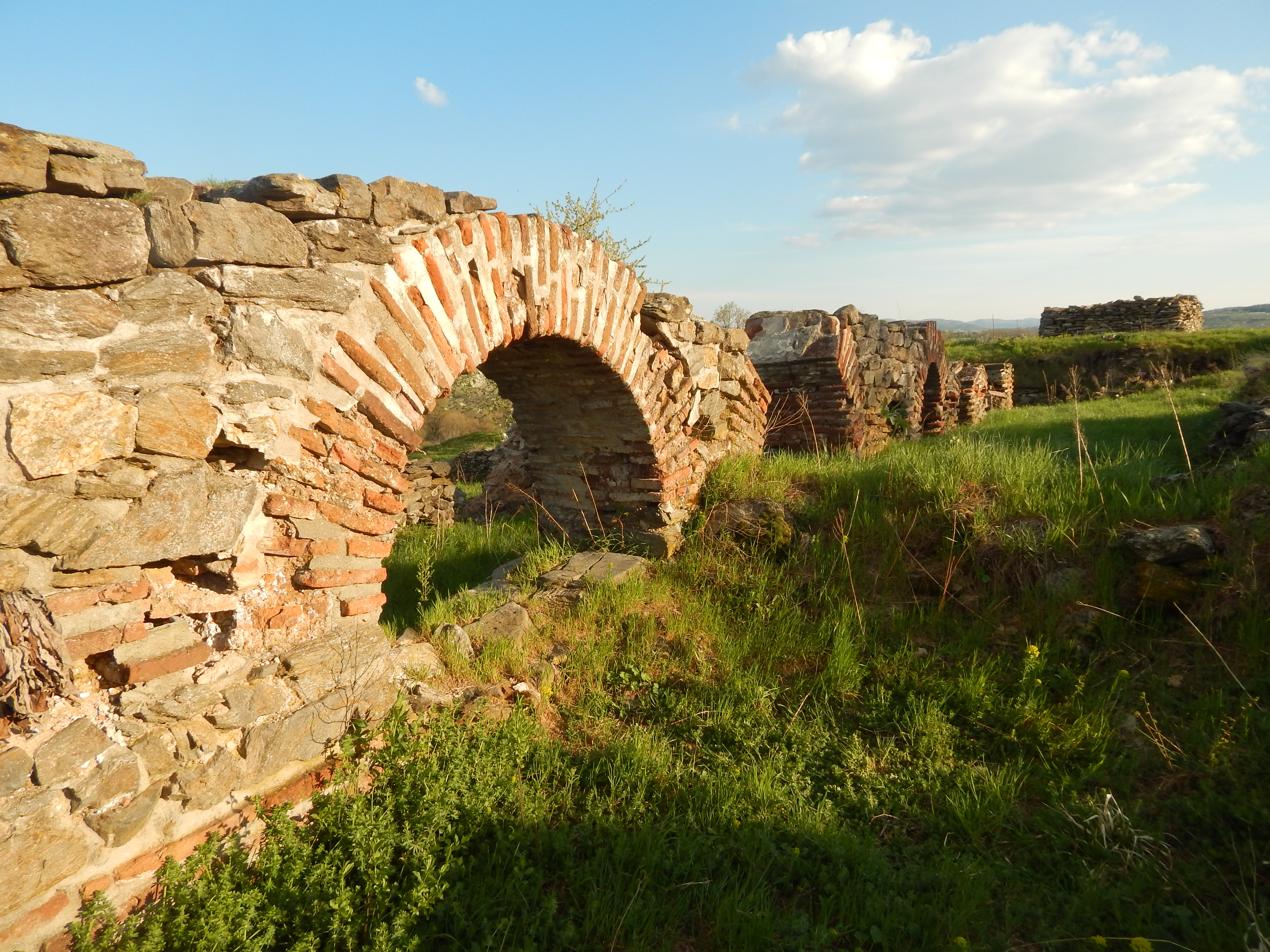
Remains of the city Justiniana Prima near modern Lebane in Serbia

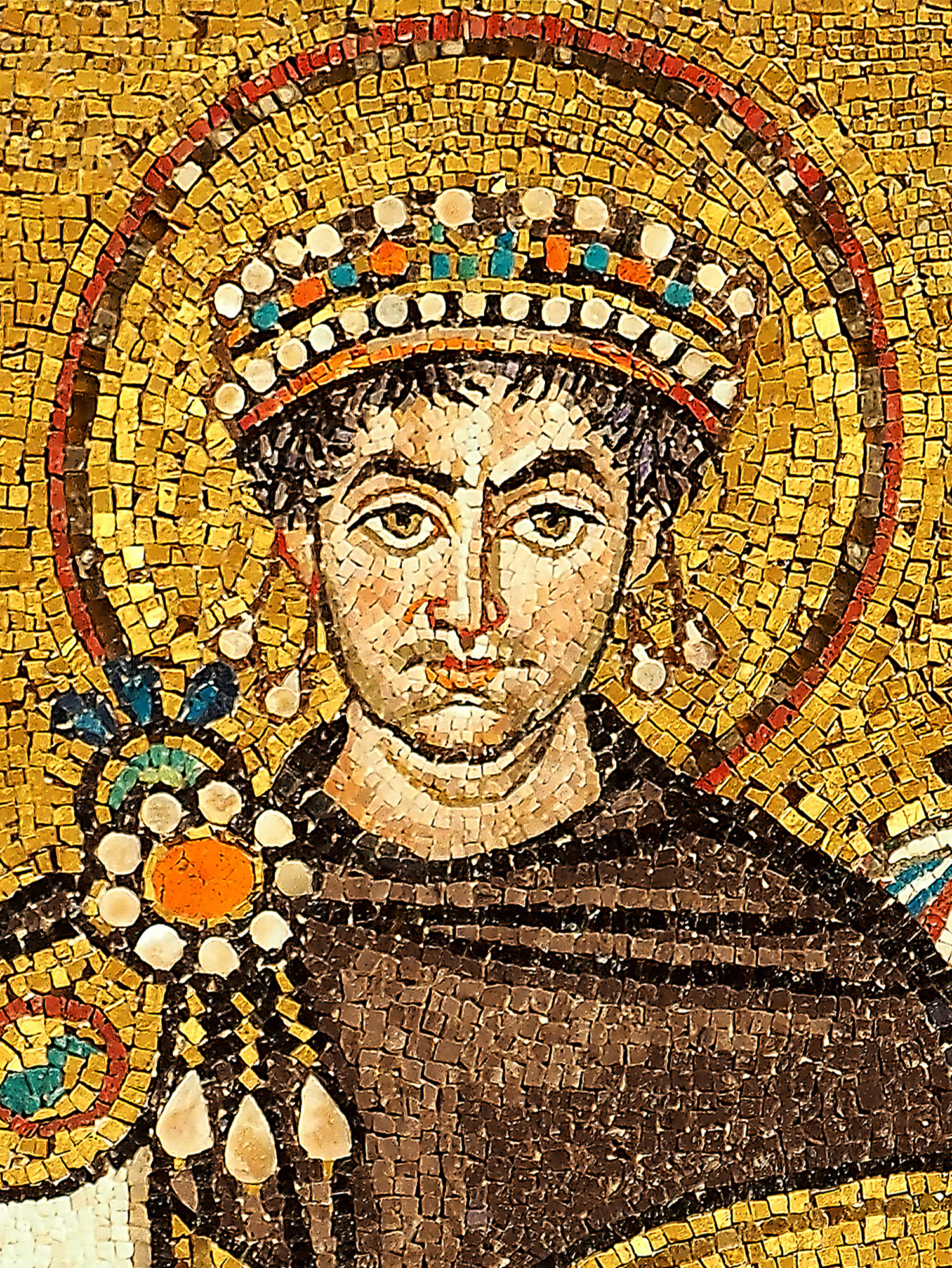
Emperor Justinian I

Archbishopric of Justiniana Prima was a Christian autonomous archbishopric with see in the city of Justiniana Prima and jurisdiction over the Late Roman Diocese of Dacia in central parts of the Southeastern Europe.

== History ==
The archdiocese was established in 535 AD by Emperor Justinian I, in his presumed home-town of Justiniana Prima (near present-day Lebane, in Southern Serbia).

The establishment is mentioned in Justinian's own Novel XI from 535, when he promotes the metropolitan to an archbishop, independent from the Archbishop of Thessalonica. The very first archbishop of Justiniana Prima was Amincius, later martyred in a raid by Cumans.

Its last mention is in 602, amid the Slav raids on the Balkans.

== Administration ==
Its cathedral archiepiscopal see was at Justiniana Prima. According to Novella 11, issued in 535, the first Archbishop received canonical jurisdiction over the following Byzantine provinces, mainly on the territory of the Diocese of Dacia:

- Dacia Mediterranea
- Dacia Ripensis
- Moesia Prima
- Dardania
- Praevalitana
- Macedonia Secunda
- Part of Pannonia Secunda

But by 545, in the Novella 131, Macedonia Secunda was omitted.

=== Dioceses ===
- Bishopric of Niš, seat at Naissopolis (Niš, Serbia)

=== Archbishops ===
- Catelianus (Catellian), metropolitan becoming first archbishop in 535 AD
- Benenatus c.553
- Johannes, fl. 595

== Successor titles ==
=== Eastern Orthodox ===
The Archbishopric of Ohrid was seen as a successor of the old archbishopric. Archbishop John IV, nephew of emperor Alexios I Komnenos, resurrected the title of Archbishop of Justiniana Prima in 1143 for his own use.

=== Roman Catholic titular see ===
It is one of the titular sees listed in the Annuario Pontificio.

It has had the following incumbents, all of the archiepiscopal (intermediary) rank:

- Giovanni Panico (1935.10.17 – 1962.03.19) (later Cardinal)
- Aurelio Sabattani (1965.06.24 – 1983.02.02) (later Cardinal)
- Édouard Gagnon, Sulpicians (P.S.S.) (1983.07.07 – 1985.05.25), (later Cardinal
- Jean-Claude Périsset (1998.11.12 – ...), Apostolic Nuncio (papal ambassador) emeritus to Germany

== See also ==
- Archbishopric of Ohrid

== Sources ==
- Bulić, Dejan (2013). "The Fortifications of the Late Antiquity and the Early Byzantine Period on the Later Territory of the South-Slavic Principalities, and their re-occupation". The World of the Slavs: Studies of the East, West and South Slavs: Civitas, Oppidas, Villas and Archeological Evidence (7th to 11th Centuries AD). Belgrade: The Institute for History. pp. 137–234. ISBN 9788677431044.
- Curta, Florin (2001). "Limes and Cross: the Religious Dimension of the Sixth-century Danube Frontier of the Early Byzantine Empire". Старинар. 51: 45–70.
- Curta, Florin (2001). The Making of the Slavs: History and Archaeology of the Lower Danube Region, c. 500–700. Cambridge: Cambridge University Press. ISBN 9781139428880.
- Curta, Florin (2006). Southeastern Europe in the Middle Ages, 500–1250. Cambridge: Cambridge University Press. ISBN 978-0-521-81539-0.
- Janković, Đorđe (2004). "The Slavs in the 6th Century North Illyricum". Гласник Српског археолошког друштва. 20: 39–61.
- Meyendorff, John (1989). Imperial unity and Christian divisions: The Church 450-680 A.D. Crestwood, NY: St. Vladimir's Seminary Press. ISBN 9780881410563.
- Petrović, Vladimir P. (2007). "Pre-Roman and Roman Dardania: Historical and Geographical Considerations" (PDF). Balcanica (37). Balkanološki institut SANU: 7–23.
- Popović, Radomir V. (1996). Le Christianisme sur le sol de l'Illyricum oriental jusqu'à l'arrivée des Slaves. Thessaloniki: Institute for Balkan Studies. ISBN 9789607387103.
- Turlej, Stanisław (2016). Justiniana Prima: An Underestimated Aspect of Justinian's Church Policy. Krakow: Jagiellonian University Press. ISBN 9788323395560.
- Zeiller, Jacques (1918). Les origines chrétiennes dans les provinces danubiennes de l'Empire romain. Paris: E. De Boccard.
- Arthur Ewans, Ancient Illyria: An Archaeological Exploration
- The challenge of our past: studies in Orthodox Canon law and Church history
- Carolyn S. Snively, "Dacia Mediterranea and Macedonia Secunda in the 6th century"
