= John IV of Ohrid =

Byzantine prince of the Komnenian dynasty

John IV
- Archbishop of Justiniana Prima and all Bulgaria
- Native name: Ἰωάννης Δ΄
- Church: Greek Orthodox Church
- Archdiocese: Archbishopric of Ohrid
- Elected: c. 1139/42
- Term ended: c. 1163/64
- Predecessor: Michael Maximos
- Successor: Constantine I of Ohrid

Personal details
- Born: Adrianos Komnenos c. 1088
- Died: c. 1163/64
- Parents: Isaac Komnenos and Irene of Alania
- Children: Theodora, anonymous daughter

Adrianos Komnenos (Greek: Ἀδριανός Κομνηνός; c. 1088 – 1163/64) was a Byzantine prince of the Komnenian dynasty, who became a monk and served as Archbishop of Ohrid as John IV (Ἰωάννης Δ΄) between 1139/42 and his death, sometime in 1163/64.

Few details about his life are known. As a younger nephew of the Byzantine emperor Alexios I Komnenos, he received a good education and military training. He went on to serve as governor of the province of Chaldia, where he distinguished himself by his good government, at least according to a celebratory piece written in his honour. He was married and had at least two daughters, but little is known of them or their offspring. Eventually he became a monk, under the name of John. In 1136–1138 he accompanied his cousin John II Komnenos on campaign, and went on to pilgrimage in the Holy Land. By 1142/43, he had been appointed as Archbishop of Ohrid, a position he maintained until his death in 1163/64. He was the first occupant of the office to use the title "Archbishop of Justiniana Prima and all Bulgaria", which later became the standard title of the see.

== Early life ==
Adrianos Komnenos was born c. 1088 as the fourth son (and sixth child) of the sebastokrator Isaac Komnenos, brother of Emperor Alexios I Komnenos (r. 1081–1118), and his wife, Irene of Alania. His life and career are mostly known from an encomium by the rhetorician Nikephoros Basilakes. He received a thorough education and training in military exercises, including riding, the javelin, and archery.

His uncle raised him to the rank of sebastos and appointed him military governor (doux) of Chaldia in northeastern Asia Minor. Adrianos distinguished himself in the position, according to Basilakes, by his honesty and incorruptibility, lack of ostentation, and his wise and compassionate stance towards the inhabitants of his province, shielding them from the usual rapaciousness of the imperial tax officials.

== Monk and archbishop ==
Sometime before October 1136, after consulting with his wife, he became a monk, taking the monastic name John, but retaining his rank of sebastos. In 1137, he accompanied his cousin John II Komnenos (r. 1118–1143) in his campaign into Cilicia and Syria. After participating in John II's triumphal entry into Antioch, he continued south and made a pilgrimage to Jerusalem and the Holy Land, before rejoining the imperial army on its return journey to Constantinople in May 1138.

Sometime after 1139, he was elected and consecrated as Archbishop of Ohrid. A terminus ante quem is provided by his attendance as a judge in the imperial synods condemning two bishops for their adherence to Bogomilism in August and October 1143, but the date may be even earlier, if Paul Gautier is correct in dating a letter he received from the philosopher Michael Italikos to Christmas 1142. Michael Italikos too, lavishes praise on John for his character, highlighting his clemency and generosity. He is next attested as attending a synod in January 1156 and the Council of Blachernae in May 1157, which condemned the newly elected Patriarch of Antioch Soterichos Panteugenos, and the rhetoricians Michael of Thessalonica and Nikephoros Basilakes. This is also the last reference to him in the Byzantine sources.

However, according to Günter Prinzing, John is to be identified with a "Bulgarian bishop Adrian", mentioned in the Laurentian Codex as having disputed in summer 1163 with the deposed Bishop of Rostov and Suzdal, Leo II, before Emperor Manuel I Komnenos (r. 1143–1180). He died sometime before 10 February 1164, when he is listed as deceased in a list of diplomas from the Theotokos Eleousa Monastery at Strumica. Of his works, only a nomocanon and a homily survive.

John was the first archbishop of Ohrid to use the title of "Archbishop of Justiniana Prima and all Bulgaria", attested in his signature in 1157, thereby laying claim to the legacy of the short-lived and long defunct Archbishopric of Justiniana Prima, founded by Justinian I in the 6th century. This title apparently fell into disuse by his immediate successors, possibly due to pressure from the Patriarchate of Constantinople. In the early 13th century, it was revived by the ambitious Demetrios Chomatenos to support his claims of quasi-patriarchal status in his clash over authority with the patriarchs of Constantinople, at the time in exile at the Empire of Nicaea. The designation finally became accepted by Constantinople after 1261, and a fixed part of the archbishops' titulature.

== Family ==
In c. 1107 he married through the intercession of his uncle, but the identity of his wife is completely unknown. The couple had at least two daughters: Theodora, and another who was unnamed. Theodora, born c. 1110, married Andronikos Kontostephanos, son of the megas doux Isaac Kontostephanos, and a distinguished commander during the early reign of Manuel I Komnenos. The couple had four children, two of whom died at a young age. Her anonymous sister, probably born c. 1115, is only known for selling some of her family's land to Emperor John II, who dedicated it to the Pantokrator Monastery. She was alive in 1136, but nothing else is known of her.

== Sources ==
- Prinzing, Günter (1988). "Wer war der "bulgarische Bischof Adrian" der Laurentius-Chronik sub anno 1164?". Jahrbücher für Geschichte Osteuropas (in German). 36 (4): 552–557. ISSN 0021-4019. JSTOR 41048163.
- Prinzing, Günter (2012). "The autocephalous Byzantine ecclesiastical province of Bulgaria/Ohrid. How independent were its archbishops?". Bulgaria Mediaevalis. 3: 355–383. ISSN 1314-2941.
- Stiernon, Lucien (1963). "Notes de titulature et de prosopographie byzantines: Adrien (Jean) et Constantin Comnène, sébastes". Revue des études byzantines (in French). 21: 179–198. doi:10.3406/rebyz.1963.1306. ISSN 0771-3347.
- Varzos, Konstantinos (1984). Η Γενεαλογία των Κομνηνών [The Genealogy of the Komnenoi] (PDF) (in Greek). Vol. A1. Thessaloniki: Centre for Byzantine Studies, University of Thessaloniki.

Eastern Orthodox Church titles
Preceded by Michael Maximos	Archbishop of Ohrid; 1139/42–1163/64	Succeeded by Constantine I
