= John Kontostephanos =

Byzantine statesman of the 12th Century

John Komnenos Kontostephanos (Greek: Ἰωάννης Κομνηνός Κοντοστέφανος; ca. 1128 – 1176/82) was a Byzantine aristocrat who served as provincial governor and military commander under his uncle, Emperor Manuel I Komnenos.

== Family ==
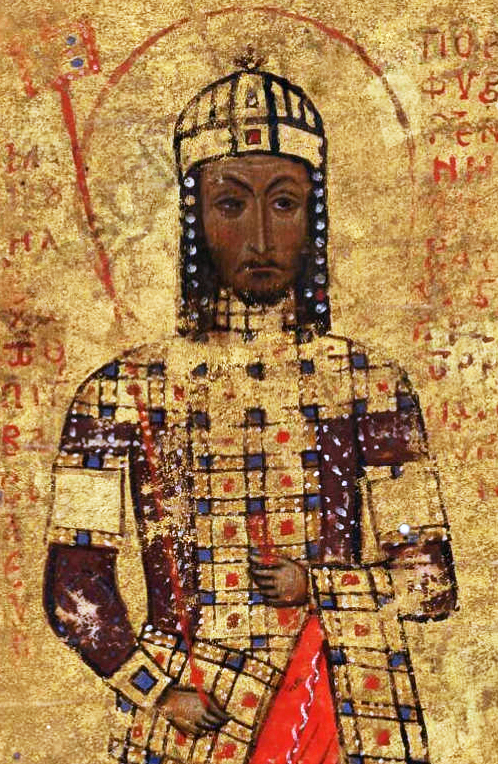
Emperor Manuel I Komnenos, uncle of John Kontostephanos

Born ca. 1128, John Kontostephanos was the eldest son of Stephen Kontostephanos, who held the title panhypersebastos and the rank of megas doux, and the "purple-born" princess Anna Komnene, daughter of Emperor John II Komnenos (r. 1118–43) and his empress Irene of Hungary; he was thus the nephew of Emperor Manuel I Komnenos (r. 1143–80). John had two younger brothers, Alexios and Andronikos, both prominent military commanders, and a sister, Irene. The Kontostephanoi were an aristocratic Byzantine family that rose to occupy a prominent place at the heart of Byzantine politics and power through their intermarrying with the imperial house of the Komnenoi. Andronikos himself married in ca. 1145/6 an unnamed member of the aristocracy—his wife has often been misidentified by modern scholars with the Theodora who married John's namesake first cousin. The couple had at least one son, named Stephen.

== Career ==
John's early life is unknown, and he first appears in November 1162 in a document concerning a property dispute of the Great Lavra monastery. At the time he served as doux (governor) of Thessalonica, with the parallel roles of apographeus and exisotes (tax assessor). He is then mentioned among the attendants of a synod at the Blachernae Palace in March 1166, along with his brother Alexios. John also appears to have taken part in his uncle Manuel I's campaigns, but with the exception of the campaign of 1176 against the Seljuk Sultanate of Rum, this is not explicitly attested. Even in the latter, he is only mentioned in the summer of 1176, when his brother Alexios died of an illness at Lopadion. It is hence unclear if he participated in the Battle of Myriokephalon on 17 September. As he is not mentioned thereafter, it is possible that he was one of the many members of the aristocracy who perished in the battle. According to Konstantinos Varzos, John was most likely dead by 1182, when his brother Andronikos rebelled against the usurper Andronikos I Komnenos.

== Sources ==
- Angold, Michael (1997). The Byzantine Empire, 1025–1204: A Political History (Second ed.). London and New York: Longman. ISBN 0-582-29468-1.
- Magdalino, Paul (2002) [1993]. The Empire of Manuel I Komnenos, 1143–1180 (Second ed.). Cambridge: Cambridge University Press. ISBN 9780521526531.
- Varzos, Konstantinos (1984). Η Γενεαλογία των Κομνηνών [The Genealogy of the Komnenoi] (PDF) (in Greek). Vol. A2. Thessaloniki: Centre for Byzantine Studies, University of Thessaloniki.
- Varzos, Konstantinos (1984). Η Γενεαλογία των Κομνηνών [The Genealogy of the Komnenoi] (PDF) (in Greek). Vol. B. Thessaloniki: Centre for Byzantine Studies, University of Thessaloniki.
