= Stephen Kontostephanos =

12th-century Byzantine military leader

Stephen Kontostephanos (Greek: Στέφανος Κοντοστέφανος, c. 1107 – 1149) was a Byzantine aristocrat and military commander.

Stephen was born in c. 1107, the son of the sebastos Isaac Kontostephanos, a military commander for most of the reign of Alexios I Komnenos (r. 1081–1118), culminating in his unsuccessful service as admiral (thalassokrator) against the Italo-Normans in 1107/8. He was the third member of the family to bear the name "Stephen" after the family's progenitor and a rather obscure paternal uncle. In c. 1126, he married Anna, the second-born daughter of Emperor John II Komnenos (r. 1118–1143) and Irene of Hungary, and received the title panhypersebastos. The couple had four children: the sons John, Alexios, and Andronikos, as well as a daughter, Irene, who married Nikephoros Bryennios.

Stephen's career under John II is unknown, but he enjoyed the favour of John's youngest son and eventual successor, Manuel I Komnenos (r. 1143–1180) and is likely to have been among those who supported Manuel's accession over the rights of his elder brother Isaac Komnenos. Thus when Manuel I decided to remove the Patriarch of Constantinople Cosmas II Atticus for sympathizing with Isaac, Stephen was among the imperial relatives who participated in the synod that tried and deposed Cosmas in February 1147, with the pretext of his support for the Bogomil monk Nephon. When Cosmas, enraged at his dismissal, cursed the empress never to bear a male child, Stephen, a nervous and impetuous man, according to Niketas Choniates, tried to attack the patriarch, but at the last moment reined himself in. This made a bad impression among all the attendants, but Cosmas reportedly prophesied that Stephen would soon receive his due blow as punishment. Stephen's behaviour towards the patriarch was likely a way of demonstrating his loyalty to Manuel, whose rule was not yet secure. Choniates claims that Manuel was appalled by Stephen's violent act, but he was rehabilitated almost immediately and chosen as leader for the expedition against the Normans.

In early 1148, Manuel launched a large campaign against Roger II of Sicily, whose Normans had captured Corfu. The megas domestikos John Axouch assumed command of the land forces, and Stephen was entrusted with the fleet as the megas doux. The campaign was originally to have been led by Manuel in person, but the arrival of the German emperor Conrad III in Constantinople obliged Manuel to remain there. The Byzantine expedition reached Corfu in November 1148 and laid siege to the island's main town. The siege went on for three months, when a stone thrown by a catapult hit Stephen while he was supervising the construction of a siege machine; mortally wounded, he was carried by his son Andronikos and a few Varangian Guardsmen to his flagship, where he died. The death narrative presented by Choniates and Kinnamos bears resemblances to their respective death accounts of John II Komnenos in the sense of giving speeches to intended heirs and the presence of Varangians, potentially suggesting a common source that lauded the imperial nature of the Kontostephanoi. Despite Stephen desiring his son Andronikos to take over his position, Manuel immediately replaced him with John Axouch.

The court poet Theodore Prodromos and the so-called "Manganeios Prodromos" both describe him as a giant, whose own grave was too small to fit him, and laud his bravery and warlike achievements against the Normans, the Seljuk Turks, the Cumans and Pechenegs, and the Slavs of the western Balkans ("Illyrians and Dalmatians"). His wife survived him for several years, but it is unknown when she died; certainly it was before 1176.

== Sources ==
- Kazhdan, Alexander, ed. (1991). The Oxford Dictionary of Byzantium. Oxford and New York: Oxford University Press. ISBN 0-19-504652-8.
- McMahon, Lucas (2024). "Anna Komnene, the Kontostephanoi, and the Norman invasions of 1107–1108 and 1147–1149". Byzantinische Zeitschrift. 117 (3): 693–734. doi:10.1515/bz-2024-1170304.
- Varzos, Konstantinos (1984). Η Γενεαλογία των Κομνηνών [The Genealogy of the Komnenoi] (PDF) (in Greek). Vol. A2. Thessaloniki: Centre for Byzantine Studies, University of Thessaloniki.
