= Peter I (archbishop of Lyon) =

Peter (died 25 December 1139) was a Benedictine monk and a "prelate of more than average distinction", who held the bishopric of Viviers (1125–31, as Peter II) and subsequently the archbishopric of Lyon (1131–39, as Peter I). Throughout his archiepiscopate he held the office of Papal legate.

Peter was from Burgundy, but his family is unidentified. He was related to Albert de Posquières d'Uzès, bishop of Nîmes (1141–80). Prior to his election to Viviers, Peter was a monk of Cluny. There he first met and befriended Peter the Venerable, later abbot. He once gave Peter a golden ring as a sign of his affection. When he was transferred to Lyon, Peter wrote him a laudatory letter, in which he thanks divine providence for raising Peter "from the valley of Viviers to the mount of Lyon, a high place to a still higher place".

In 1129, in cooperation with the bishops of Die and Grenoble, Peter intervened to end the conflict between Silvion II, lord of Clérieu, and the collegiate church of Saint-Barnard de Romans. In 1130, Pope Innocent II recruited Peter to judge the case of the church of Bessan, disputed between the abbeys of Saint-Thibéry and La Chaise-Dieu. The case was judged in favour of Saint-Thibéry.

In 1138 the election of the bishop of Langres was disputed between two factions, and in June or July Peter gave his approval to the election of a Cluniac bishop—probably William of Sabran—whom he duly consecrated. Although Bernard of Clairvaux attacked Peter in a letter to Pope Innocent II on this occasion, it does not seem to have harmed Peter's reputation.

In 1139 Pope Innocent sent him as legate to the Kingdom of Jerusalem to settle a dispute between Patriarch Ralph of Domfront and the canons of the Antioch. Peter sailed to Acre and went from there to Jerusalem. He returned to Acre and died there on Christmas Day before moving on to Antioch. William of Tyre, who calls him "a man of a venerable life, simple and God-fearing, but old and now verging on senility" in his chronicle, raises the spectre of poisoning. An obituary written at the priory of Leigneux dates his death incorrectly to 31 May.

== Sources ==
- Constable, Giles (1957). "The Disputed Election at Langres in 1138". Traditio. 13: 119–52. doi:10.1017/S0362152900007947. S2CID 151663893.
- Hamilton, Bernard (1984). "Ralph of Domfront, Patriarch of Antioch (1135–40)". Nottingham Medieval Studies. 28: 1–21. doi:10.1484/J.NMS.3.115.
- Roche, Auguste (1891). Armorial généalogique et biographique des évêques de Viviers. 2 vols. Lyon.
- Vachez, Antoine (1875). Les familles chevaleresques de Lyonnais, Forez et Beaujolais aux croisades. Lyon.
