= Raymond of Poitiers =

Prince of Antioch from 1136 to 1149

Raymond
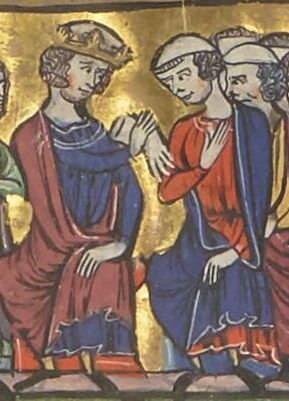
- 13th-century depiction of Raymond (right) treating with Emperor John II Komnenos

Prince of Antioch
- Reign: 1136-29 June 1149
- Born: 1105; Toulouse, France
- Died: 29 June 1149 (aged 43–44); Inab, Seljuk Empire
- Spouse: Constance of Antioch
- Issue Detail: Bohemond III of Antioch; Maria of Antioch; Philippa of Antioch
- House: Ramnulfids
- Father: William IX of Aquitaine
- Mother: Philippa of Toulouse

Raymond of Poitiers (1105 – 29 June 1149) was the prince of Antioch from 1136 until his death. He ruled the Principality of Antioch as the first husband of Princess Constance. He preserved the integrity of the principality, but failed in his attempts to expand it.

Raymond was born to Duke William IX of Aquitaine and Countess Philippa of Toulouse. Aquitaine passed to William X, Raymond's older brother, and Raymond moved to the court of King Henry I of England. There he received an offer from King Fulk of Jerusalem and the nobles of Antioch to marry Constance, a child princess, and take up rule over her principality. Despite the respective attempts of her kinsman King Roger II of Sicily and her mother, Princess Alice, to prevent the union, Raymond arrived in the Latin East and married Constance in 1136 with the help of the Latin patriarch of Antioch, Ralph of Domfront.

Raymond's priority as prince was to recapture Cilicia, but he was foiled by the arrival of Emperor John II Komnenos, who both captured the region and exacted homage from Raymond. Raymond promised to surrender Antioch in return for a new principality in northern Syria, but was not eager to help John carve it out. A power struggle with Ralph, which originated shortly after Raymond's accession, flared up after the emperor's departure and ended with the patriarch's deposition in 1140. Raymond readily assisted Fulk in his struggles against the Muslim Turkic rulers in Syria and initially cooperated with his northern neighbor Count Joscelin II of Edessa. The principality saw an influx of Poitevin culture, and Raymond was able to secure the appointment of a Poitevin, Aimery of Limoges, to the patriarchal office.

John returned in 1142 and demanded Antioch, but died in Cilicia the following year before he could launch an attack. Raymond attempted to conquer Cilicia from John's successor, Emperor Manuel I Komnenos, and Aleppo from Imad al-Din Zengi, but was driven back by both. Raymond's relationship with Joscelin broke down after Joscelin refused to assist Raymond against Zengi, and when Zengi attacked Edessa in 1144, Raymond declined Joscelin's pleas for help. The loss of Edessa to the Muslims triggered the Second Crusade. King Louis VII of France and his wife, Raymond's niece Queen Eleanor, arrived in Antioch in 1148. Raymond enlisted Eleanor's help in convincing Louis to attack Zengi's son and successor, Nur al-Din, but Louis grew jealous of their relationship, which was rumored to be incestuous. After Louis left, Raymond boycotted the crusade, which ended in an ignominious defeat at Damascus. This defeat encouraged the sultan of Rum, Mesud I, who launched an attack on Marash with Nur al-Din's help. Raymond clashed with Zengi, and was killed in the Battle of Inab.

== Background and character ==
Raymond was a son of William IX of Aquitaine and Philippa of Toulouse. William was count of Poitiers and duke of Aquitaine and Gascony as well as one of the leaders of the Crusade of 1101. Raymond was born in Toulouse in 1115, at a time when his mother had briefly succeeded in asserting her claim to the County of Toulouse. He was given a name associated with the counts of Toulouse and otherwise unknown in the House of Poitiers.

The only contemporary writer to discuss William X's progeny is the chronicler of the Abbey of Saint-Maixent near Poitiers, who attributes two sons—William X and Raymond—and five unnamed daughters to William IX and Philippa; according to his account, Raymond would have been the couple's youngest child. Armenian sources—Gregory the Priest, Michael the Syrian, and Basil the Doctor—describe the lords of Marash, Baldwin and Reynald, as brothers of Raymond. William of Tyre mentions yet another brother, Henry.

Raymond's older brother, William X, inherited their father's titles in 1126. Raymond was left landless, and is not mentioned in any of his brother's acts. By 1130, Raymond had left Poitou and joined the court of King Henry I of England, where he received his knighthood. He may have been sent to Henry to keep him out of his brother's way or to teach him the ways of court. Raymond grew up to be a handsome man famous for his physical strength. He received a subpar education, but was conventionally devout. (Note: Ibn al-Adim writes that Raymond could bend an iron bar. John Kinnamos likens him to Hercules. William of Tyre notes that Raymond was "observant in his religious duties and punctilious in his attendance at church services, particularly on great feast days".) William of Tyre considered him impulsive, idle, and too fond of gambling, but respected his chivalry and moral integrity.

== Accession ==
Antioch was one of four crusader states in the Levant, which were surrounded by hostile Muslim powers.

In 1130, Prince Bohemond II of Antioch died in battle with the Muslim Turks, leaving his infant daughter, Constance, as heir to the Principality of Antioch in the Latin East. Her mother, Princess Alice, tried to establish control over this crusader state, but faced significant opposition. Without a prince, Antioch was in disarray; Alice's brother-in-law King Fulk of Jerusalem had to leave his kingdom several times to defend Antioch against Turks. At some point between 1133 and 1135, Fulk–erstwhile a cupbearer to Raymond's father–and the Antiochene nobles opposed to Alice decided that Constance should be married to provide Antioch with a new prince, and their choice fell on Raymond. The plan was kept secret to prevent interference from Alice or King Roger II of Sicily. As Bohemond II's kinsman, Roger was heir presumptive to the principality and believed that he should select Constance's husband. Because of this, the mission was entrusted to a low-profile Hospitaller knight, Gerald Jeberrus.

Raymond embarked on his journey from England to Antioch after the death of his patron, King Henry, in December 1135. To avoid attracting attention, he could not afford to bring any troops with him. Roger got word of his intentions anyway and resolved to arrest the groom-to-be as he passed through his lands in southern Italy. Having split up his entourage and disguised himself variously as a pilgrim and a merchant's servant, Raymond succeeded in embarking on a ship to Antioch. Alice, meanwhile, sent an embassy to Constantinople to acknowledge Byzantine overlordship and propose that Constance marry Manuel, son of Emperor John II Komnenos. The barons of Antioch were aghast, and the Latin patriarch of Antioch, Ralph of Domfront, was determined not to be replaced by a Byzantine-appointed Orthodox patriarch.

When Raymond arrived in Antioch in mid-1136, Alice was in a strong position, having control over the government and the city's citadel. To prevail against her, Raymond needed the support and assistance of Patriarch Ralph. Ralph was willing, but demanded liege homage from Raymond in return. Raymond acquiesced, and their agreement was put into writing. William of Tyre says that Ralph then convinced Alice that Raymond had come to marry her rather than her daughter; after Alice allowed Raymond into the city, Ralph immediately married him to the 8-year-old Constance. According to William, the patriarch also promised to arrange for Alice to marry Raymond's brother Henry if he came to Antioch. Raymond thus became prince, and because his authority could not be doubted, Alice's party abandoned her. She retreated to her dower lands in Latakia and Jabala, but–in William's words–"ever after she pursued the prince with relentless hatred". (Note: William wrote about the circumstances of Raymond's accession 40 years after the event, and historians have questioned his account–particularly the story of Ralph tricking Alice into believing that Raymond had come to marry her.)

== Reign ==
=== Initial campaigns ===
By the time Raymond took control over Antioch, the principality had been much reduced. The Turks had gained large areas on the eastern frontline, while the Armenian Roupenid princes had entrenched themselves in Cilicia. Raymond's priority was to recover Cilicia. He allied with Baldwin of Marash and launched a campaign against the Roupenid prince Leo I with the approval of King Fulk. Count Joscelin II of Edessa–ruler of the northernmost crusader state and Baldwin's suzerain–supported Leo, who was his uncle. Leo and Joscelin defeated the invaders, but after Leo agreed to meet Baldwin for talks, he was treacherously captured and sent to Antioch. In return for his freedom, Leo promised to deliver to Raymond the Cilician fortresses of Mamistra, Adana, and Savranda; Leo's sons as hostages; and a large ransom. Leo reneged on that promise after leaving prison. War was resumed until early 1137, when Joscelin brokered peace. Raymond's initiative helped reverse the deterioration of Antioch's military position.

Raymond's brother, Duke William X of Aquitaine, died in April 1137. His heir was his daughter Eleanor. Raymond had a claim to rule Aquitaine as William's closest male relative, but he was too far to either succeed William as duke or act as Eleanor's guardian. By the time Raymond learned of his brother's death, the succession to his lands had been settled: Eleanor was swiftly married to King Louis VII of France, who became duke in her right.

Another great threat to Antioch was Imad al-Din Zengi, the Turkic atabeg of Mosul, Aleppo, and Hama. In 1137, Zengi besieged Montferrand, prompting Count Raymond II of Tripoli and King Fulk to request help from Antioch. Prince Raymond called a council of nobles and dignitaries and persuaded them to march to Montferrand. He linked up with the count of Edessa and travelled south to Buqaia to find that Fulk had already been relieved.

=== Arrival of the emperor ===
Initially, Prince Raymond and Patriarch Ralph worked in concert and probably finalized the organization of dioceses in the principality. Their relationship quickly soured, however. William of Tyre says that Ralph started acting arrogantly and that Raymond resented having been forced to do homage to him. An open conflict between the prince and the patriarch was averted by the arrival of a common threat.

Emperor John appeared with a vast army in mid-1137. This was the first campaign of a Byzantine emperor in northern Syria for more than a century, and the Latins were apparently caught completely off-guard. After swiftly subduing Cilicia, John besieged Antioch on 29 August. He was angered by Raymond's marriage with Constance and demanded that the Latins honor the oath given to Emperor Alexios I Komnenos during the First Crusade, by which they were to cede Antioch to the Byzantine emperor. Raymond hurried back to Antioch. Because the city had not yet been invested, he and his bodyguard were able to slip in through the Iron Gate.

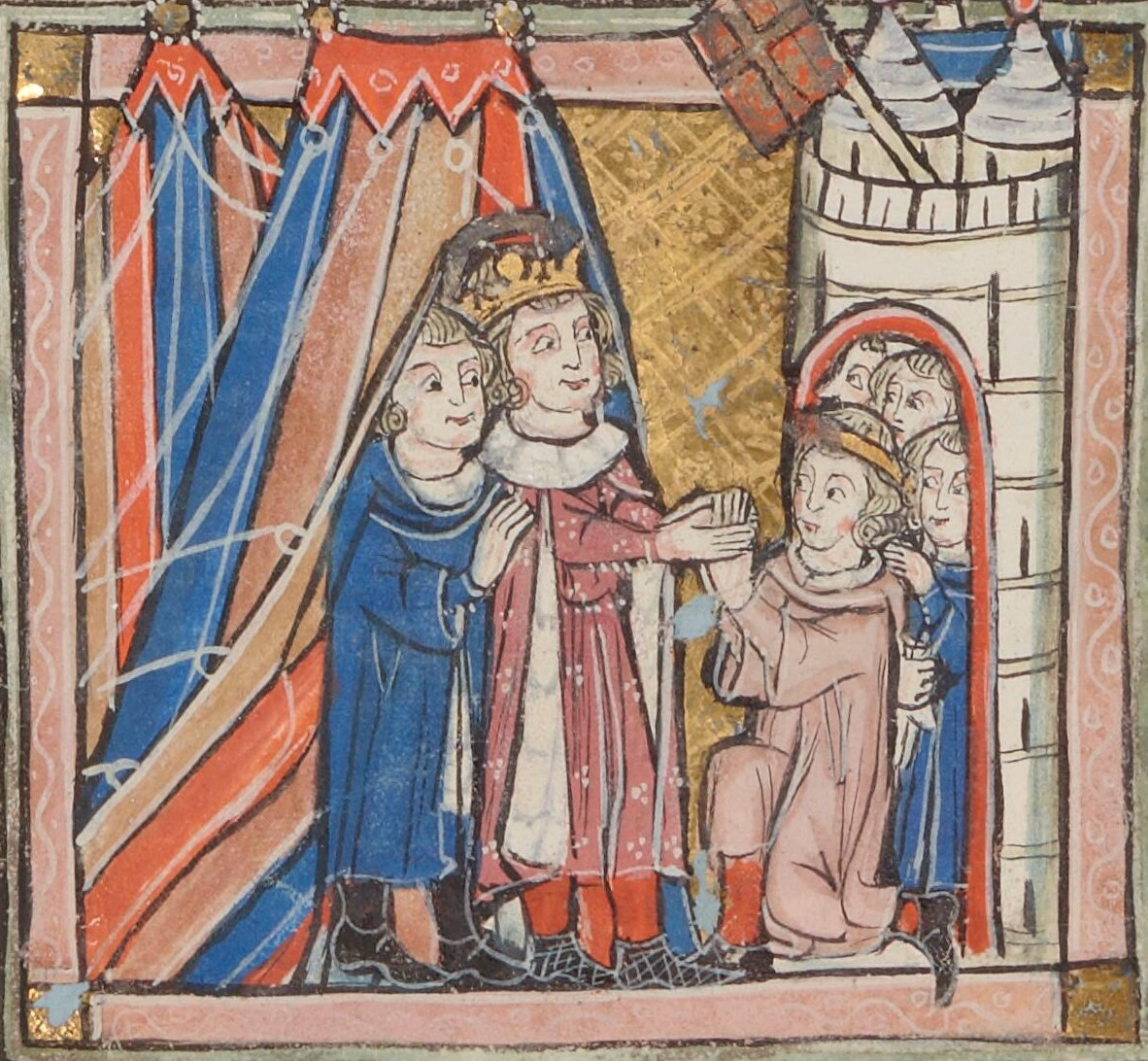
When John II Komnenos arrived with a vast army, Raymond had no choice but kneel and swear fealty.

John bombarded Antioch for several days before Raymond realized that he could not resist him. Raymond first offered to recognize John as his suzerain in return for retaining the principality, but John insisted on an unconditional surrender. The prince replied that he must confer with the king of Jerusalem, who affirmed the emperor's claim. Raymond had no choice but to kneel before John, swear fealty, and allow him free access to both the city and citadel of Antioch. John promised to grant Aleppo, Shaizar, Hama, and Homs to Raymond and his heirs if they were conquered from the Turks, whereupon Antioch would revert to the emperor. Fearing that John would replace him with a Greek Orthodox patriarch, Ralph appealed to Pope Innocent II. Raymond was concerned that Ralph would stir up an armed conflict with John, and so had the patriarch imprisoned in late 1137.

In March 1138, the pope declared–probably in response to Ralph's letter–that any Latin Christians assisting the Byzantines against Antioch should be excommunicated. Ralph's actions against the Byzantines were highly inconvenient for Raymond because of the Byzantine military presence, and it is likely at this point that he made common cause with Ralph's enemies within the cathedral chapter and encouraged them to rebel. Lambert, the archdeacon, and Arnulf, a canon, were aggrieved by Ralph's management of church revenues. The prince convinced them to take their complaints to the pope, which forced Ralph to travel to Rome to defend himself; further charges included simony, incontinence, and irregular election.

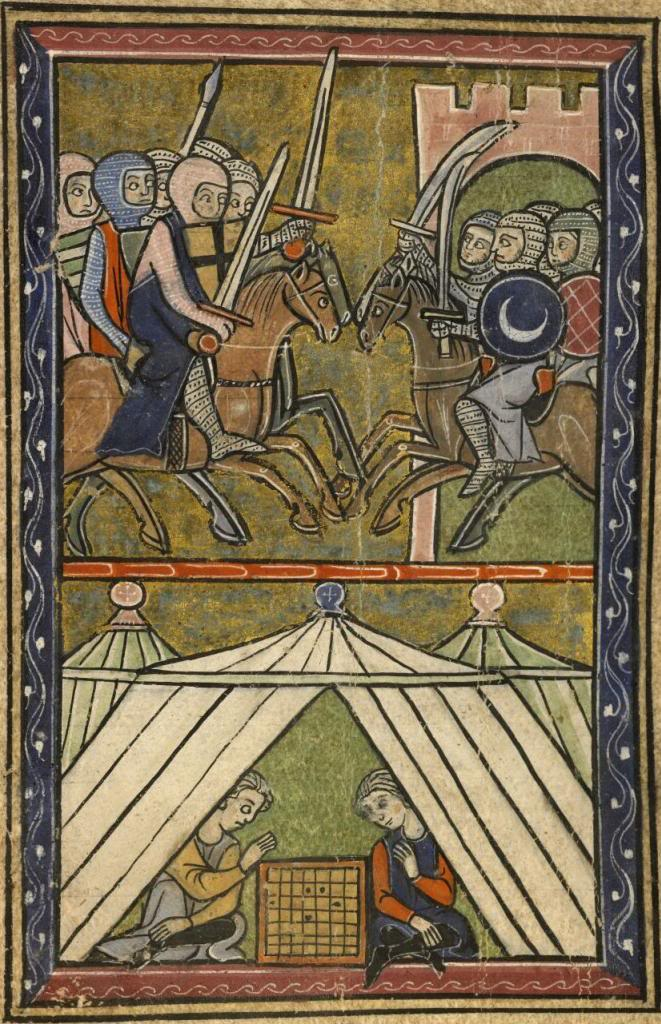
Instead of helping John take Shaizar, Raymond and Joscelin played dice in their tents.

In April 1138, John moved against Shaizar. While he quickly took the town, he was unable to take the citadel. Raymond and Joscelin were with him, but contributed little, spending their time in their tents playing dice; they knew that if the campaign were successful, John would have the right to demand the cession of Antioch. William of Tyre says that Joscelin secretly resented Raymond and encouraged him not to cooperate with the Byzantines. When John decided to abandon the siege, Raymond unsuccessfully attempted to persuade him to continue.

By the time John returned to Antioch, Ralph had been released from prison. A royal entry was staged for the emperor: while he rode on horseback, Ralph greeted him at the gates, with Raymond and Joscelin walking on either side as the emperor's grooms. Once he had taken residence in the prince's palace, John summoned Raymond and demanded control of the citadel to prepare for future campaigns against the Turks. After a series of violent incidents targeting Greeks in Antioch–which were, according to William, orchestrated by Joscelin–John decided to leave. In an effort to retain the emperor's goodwill, Raymond offered to admit imperial officials into Antioch, but John demurred.

=== Quarrels with the patriarch ===
After the Byzantines' departure, Raymond resumed his dispute with Ralph. Innocent recognized Ralph as patriarch and decreed that a papal legate would travel to Antioch to investigate the charges against him. Not only did Ralph receive support from Innocent, but he also managed to ally with King Roger of Sicily against Raymond. Raymond could not afford to imprison Ralph upon his return: doing so might offend the pope, whose help he needed to mobilize European forces against the Turks after the Byzantine alliance fell through. Instead, he barred Ralph from entering Antioch. Ralph stayed in a nearby monastery until Joscelin invited him to Edessa.

In 1139, Raymond allowed Ralph to return in anticipation of the legate's arrival. The legate–Archbishop Peter of Lyon–died soon after his arrival, and Ralph retained his office. As it seemed unlikely that the case against Ralph would be pursued, Lambert and Arnulf offered peace in return for being restored to their offices. Ralph reinstated Lambert as archdeacon but refused to be reconciled with Arnulf. This made it easy for Raymond to persuade Arnulf to again request an investigation into Ralph's conduct. Innocent then appointed a new legate, Cardinal Bishop Alberic of Ostia.

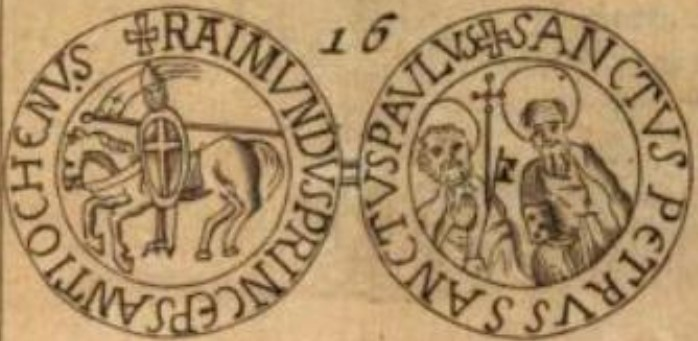
Raymond's seal depicts him on horseback and identifies him as "Raymond, prince of Antioch".

Raymond permitted Ralph to stay in Antioch while Alberic was on his way, but the patriarch's powers were restricted. In 1139, Raymond travelled to Jerusalem on a pilgrimage. The Latin patriarch of Jerusalem, William of Malines, and Peter, prior of the Holy Sepulchre, took the opportunity to request restitution of property in Antioch that had once belonged to the Holy Sepulchre but had since changed hands; a garden ended up in the possession of the Monastery of Saint Paul's. At Raymond's invitation, William and Peter arrived in Antioch in April 1140 to present their case. Abbot Robert and the monks of St Paul's repeatedly declined to appear before Raymond's court, arguing that the dispute fell exclusively under the jurisdiction of the patriarch of Antioch rather than a secular tribunal. In response, Raymond postponed proceedings twice and issued successive summonses for the monks to attend. After they ignored a third summons, he proceeded to rule in favour of the Holy Sepulchre on 19 April.

Raymond reinforced his decision in favor of the Holy Sepulchre by formally confirming all possessions held by the community within the principality. Raymond's wife, Constance, participated in this act, acting apparently as his equal. Because of her youth, Raymond had not involved her in the government of the principality in the first part of his reign, but her role increased as she matured.

In 1140, Raymond marched south to assist King Fulk at the siege of Banias. Zengi's general Ibrahim ibn Turgut was raiding the coast near Tyre when he was surprised, defeated, and killed by Raymond's army. At Banias, Raymond and Fulk were joined by Cardinal Alberic. The city fell in June, and Raymond joined his comrades on a pilgrimage to Jerusalem. Alberic accompanied them and was able to discuss Ralph's case with Raymond, who realized that the ruling would be to his advantage. The synod was held in Antioch from 30 November to 2 December. Ralph refused to attend, and Raymond coerced the synod to condemn him. As Raymond controlled the city's garrison, the legate was able to reach Ralph with an armed escort and proclaim him deposed. Raymond promptly had the former patriarch chained and imprisoned. From 1140, Joscelin appears to have recognized Raymond as his overlord.

=== Poitevin influence ===
Most of the noble families of the Principality of Antioch hailed from Normandy, Picardy, Brittany, or southern Italy, and Raymond's rule did not see a significant immigration of Poitevins. His most notable appointment was that of Aimery of Limoges, a fellow Poitevin who replaced Ralph of Domfront as patriarch; he also selected Peter Armoin, Aimery's uncle, to serve as castellan. Although the principality remained primarily Norman in character, Raymond's Poitevin origin was strongly conspicuous to his contemporaries. (Note: The Byzantine writer Niketas Choniates refers to Raymond simply as Petevinos, while Michael, the Syriac Orthodox patriarch of Antioch, uses the Syriac form Bedawi, apparently derived from the same designation.) He established a church in Antioch dedicated to Hilary of Poitiers, a saint who was little known outside France.

Under Raymond's patronage, an epic poem recounting the Crusade of 1101 was composed. Later incorporated into the Old French Crusade Cycle as Les Chétifs, the poem differed from works such as Chanson d'Antioche and Chanson de Jérusalem by giving only limited attention to Jerusalem's ruling house. In doing so, it reflects a literary tradition associated primarily with Antioch and the Poitevins.

=== Between the Byzantines and the Turks ===
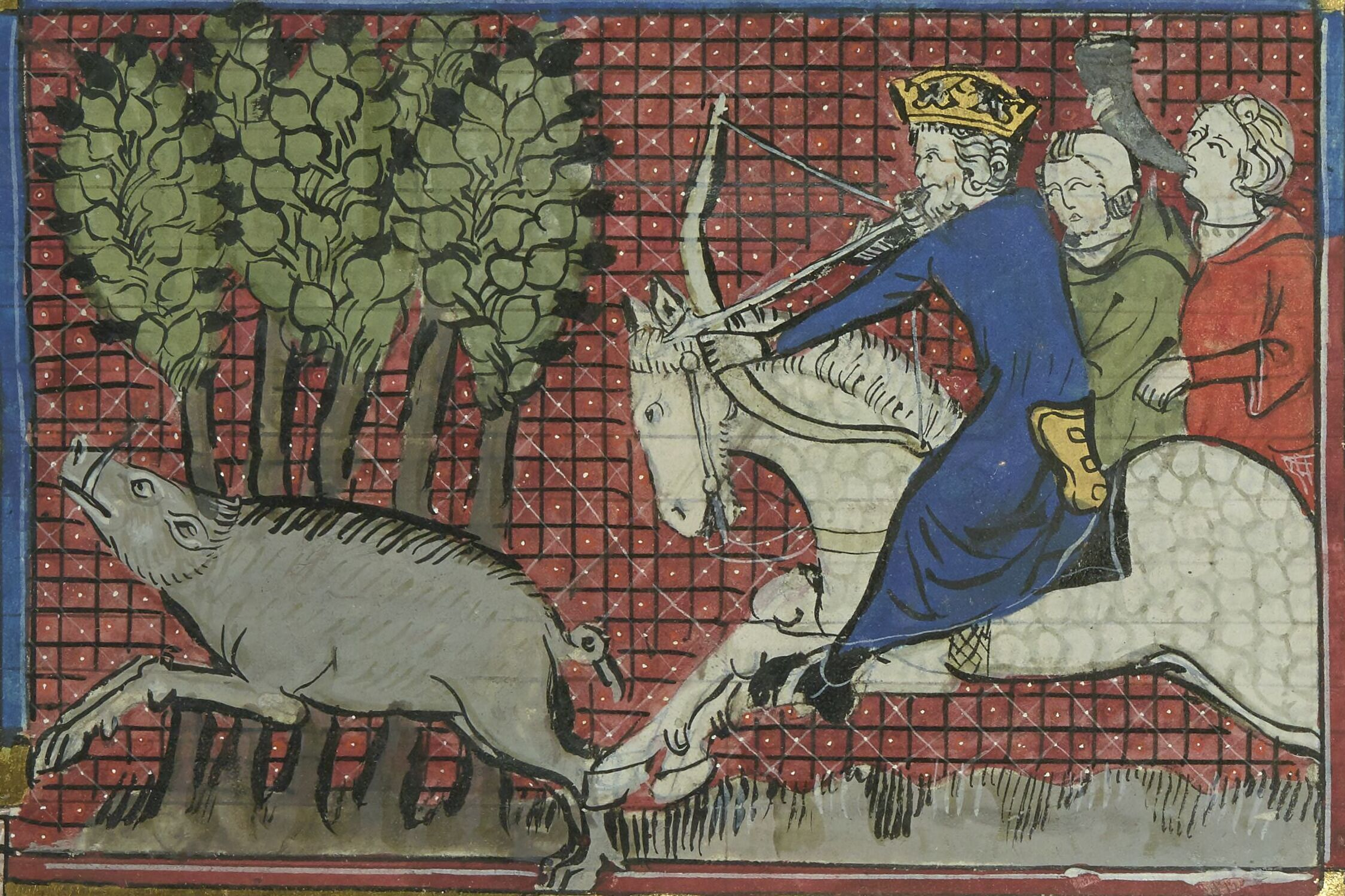
John's death following a hunting accident averted a Byzantine attack on Antioch.

In 1142, Emperor John once again marched east with his army, driving away Turks and forcing Joscelin to pay homage. On 25 September, he arrived at Baghras, from where he sent a message to Raymond demanding the cession of Antioch in return for a new principality to be carved out from future conquests. Raymond responded that he must consult his vassals, who declared at a council that Raymond ruled only as the princess's husband and thus had no right to alienate her lands; and that even the prince and princess together had no right to dispose of the principality without their vassals' consent, lest they be deposed. War was then inevitable, but John had to overwinter in Cilicia before he could attack. There he took a wound in a hunting accident and died in March 1143. His successor, Manuel I, had to solidify his hold on Constantinople, and the Byzantines' eastward expansion was put on hold.

Raymond's confidence grew in the aftermath of John's death and Zengi's defeat. He advanced eastward as far as Biza'a, but his streak was ruined by Joscelin, who made truce with Sawar, governor of Aleppo, instead of assisting Raymond. A few months later, Raymond invaded Cilicia after Manuel refused to cede it to him. The new emperor could not respond in person but sent troops commanded by the brothers John and Andronikos Kontostephanos and the general Prosouch as well as a sea expedition under the admiral Demetrios Branas. Raymond was driven out of Cilicia and chased all the way to the walls of Antioch.

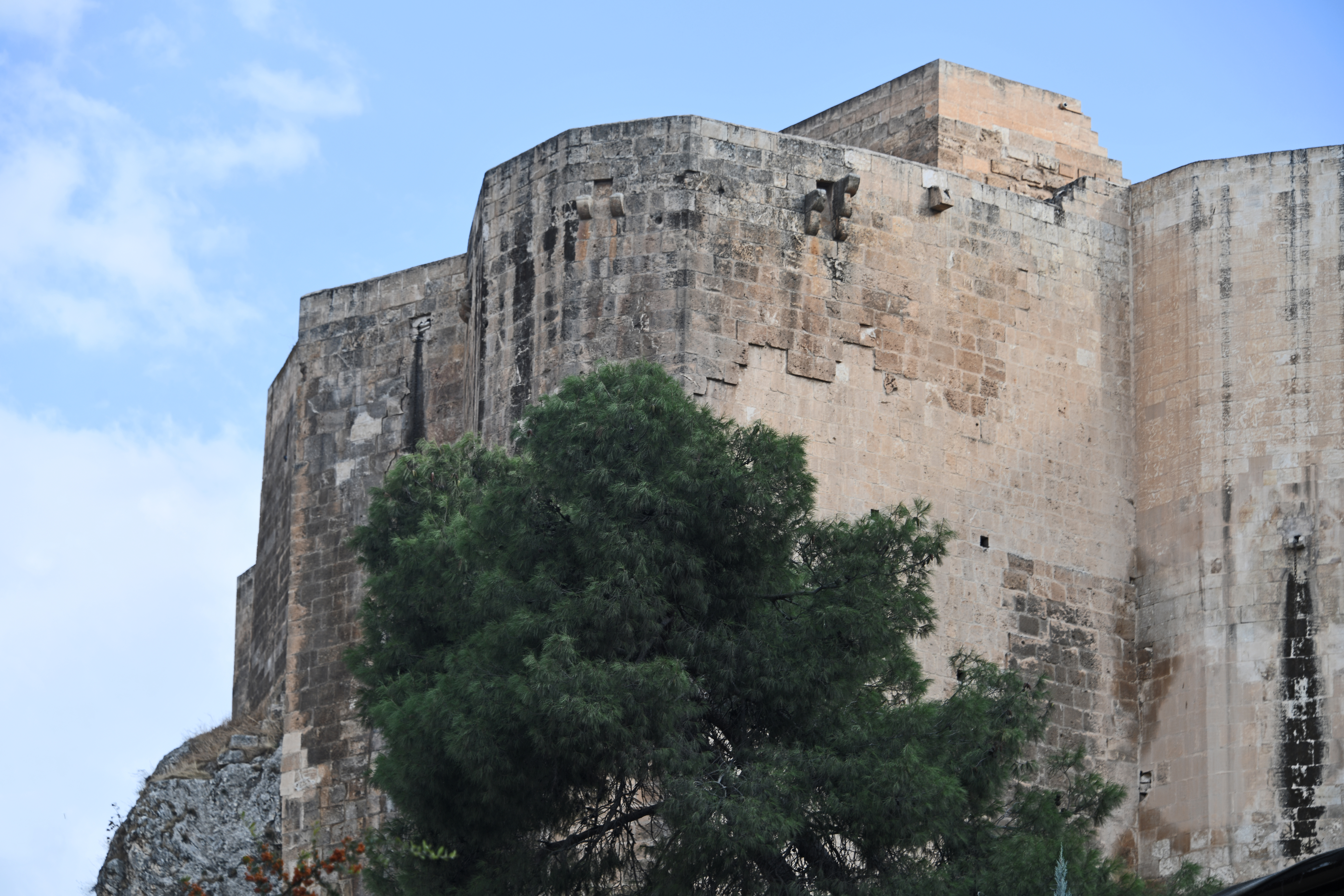
Raymond refused to aid Joscelin in relieving Edessa and the city and its castle fell to the Zengids.

King Fulk died in a hunting accident in 1143. Encouraged by the deaths of Fulk and John as well as Raymond's deteriorating relationship with Joscelin, Zengi attacked Edessa in 1144. While Fulk's widow, Queen Melisende, mustered a force to relieve Edessa, Raymond refused Joscelin's appeals for help. The queen's army did not arrive in time; Edessa fell to Zengi on 24 December. Joscelin's state was much reduced by the loss of his capital and he openly broke with Raymond.

After defeating a Turkic raid in 1145, Raymond felt that he needed allies. Despite his vassals' misgivings, he travelled to Constantinople to meet Manuel, but the emperor declined to receive him. Raymond then went to pay his respects at the tomb of Manuel's father, John II, which earned him an audience with the young emperor. Raymond paid homage and acknowledged imperial rights over Antioch. Manuel showered Raymond with gifts and promised a money subsidy but could not commit to a military assistance. This was the first visit of a prince of Antioch to Constantinople, and it deterred Zengi from launching further attacks on the northern crusader states.

Zengi was murdered by a servant in September 1146. His enemies took advantage of the succession crisis that followed to recapture the lands they had lost to him. Raymond led a raid all the way to Aleppo, but refused to help Joscelin and Baldwin retake Edessa. Zengi's son Nur al-Din was counter-attacking Raymond's lands when he heard about Joscelin's move. In the ensuing battle, Joscelin was defeated and Baldwin killed. Edessa was left desolate and its Christian population exiled.

=== Second Crusade ===
News of the fall of Edessa shocked the Christians of Europe and triggered the Second Crusade, led by Kings Louis VII of France and Conrad III of Germany. While Louis was preparing to take the cross, Raymond sent splendid gifts in an attempt to win his goodwill. King Louis and Queen Eleanor landed at Port Saint Symeon on 19 March 1148. Raymond and his entire household travelled from Antioch to welcome them. Eleanor, who was only nine years younger than her uncle, reveled in his company. Louis, on the other hand, was dismayed by the luxurious and self-indulgent lifestyle at Raymond's court. Raymond urged Louis to attack Aleppo, the center of Nur al-Din's power, and led French cavalry on a preliminary reconnaissance up to the city's walls. Louis hesitated to support Raymond's plan as requests for help came from the other crusader rulers as well: Joscelin still had his eyes on Edessa, Raymond of Tripoli hoped to recapture Montferrand, while the High Court of Jerusalem invited Louis to join King Conrad in the south.

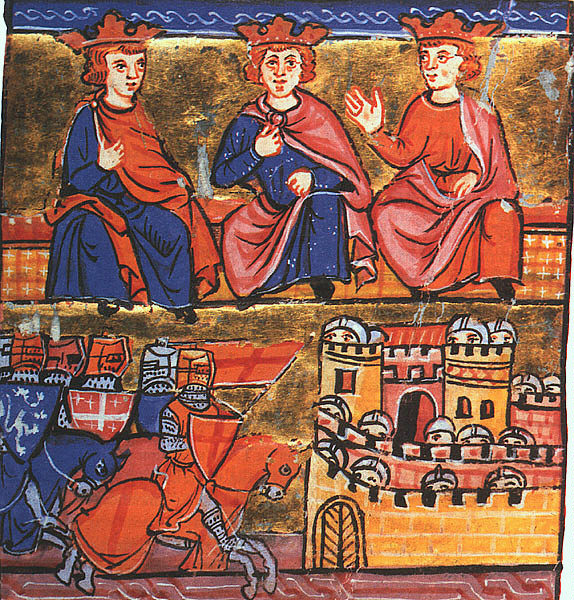
Louis refused to aid Raymond and instead linked up with other crusade leaders in Jerusalem. They attacked Damascus, where they were defeated.

Raymond counted greatly on Eleanor's help, but neither were able to persuade Louis and the royal couple's marriage was unravelling. The contemporary chronicler John of Salisbury, who witnessed the couple's marital counseling with Pope Eugene III on their return from the Second Crusade, reports that Raymond engaged in "constant, indeed almost continuous, conversation" with Eleanor, which "aroused the king’s suspicions". Thierry Galeran, Louis's confidant and Eleanor's enemy, warned Louis that "guilt under the guise of kinship could lie concealed". John of Salisbury mentions rumors of Eleanor committing adultery, while William of Tyre says that Raymond seduced Eleanor to injure Louis. Louis decided that they should leave Antioch for Jerusalem, but Eleanor told him that he could go without her and that she intended to stay in Antioch and seek an annulment of their marriage. Raymond supported Eleanor's decision; William of Tyre writes that Raymond, resenting Louis for his rejection, "resolved also to deprive him of his wife, either by force or by secret intrigue." As he departed from Antioch, Louis took Eleanor with him by force. Infuriated, Raymond refused to go to Jerusalem and took no part in the ensuing crusade. The crusaders' eventual target was Damascus, where they were quickly dealt a humiliating defeat. Accusations of treachery emerged: one of the suspects was Raymond, who was rumored to have incited some of the crusaders to sabotage the siege to spite Louis. (Note: Others placed the blame on King Baldwin III of Jerusalem, Count Thierry of Flanders, or the Knights Templar. The historian Malcolm Barber gives no credence to any of these rumors.)

The Turkic sultan of Rum, Mesud I, took advantage of the Christian discomfiture. When he attacked Marash, Raymond prepared to intervene. Mesud asked Nur al-Din to divert Raymond, but the prince allied with Ali ibn Wafa of the Order of the Assassins. The Assassins were Shia Muslims who had been carving out a state for themselves on the principality's southern border, but Ali and Raymond felt sufficiently threatened by Nur al-Din to join cause and forced him to retreat in November 1148. Early next year, Nur al-Din invaded the principality and defeated Raymond at Baghras. He then laid siege to the fortress of Inab. William writes that Raymond marched to its defense so impulsively that he did not wait for all of his knights to assemble. Nur al-Din retreated after hearing of the approach of Raymond and the Assassins, but soon realized that he had overestimated Raymond's strength. Ali counselled Raymond to retreat, but his advice was disregarded.

On 28 June 1149, Raymond and Ali encamped in a valley between Inab and Ghab Plain. Nur al-Din's troops surrounded them in the night. The following day, Raymond realized that his only way out was to charge. In the ensuing battle, his army was annihilated. Reynald of Marash and Ali perished, as did Raymond; he was killed by the general Shirkuh. When the dust had settled, the victors found Raymond's body on the battlefield. They cut off the head and the right arm and presented them to Nur al-Din. After recovering what remained of the prince's corpse, the Latins could only identify it by some distinctive scars; it was then interred in Antioch. Nur al-Din sent the arm and the head in a silver case to the caliph of Baghdad, al-Muqtafi, and they passed from one Turkish leader to another.

== Family ==
Raymond and Constance appear to have been on a path to joint rulership; in his last document, Raymond says that he acts "with the permission and assertion of my wife, Constance, sole daughter of Bohemond the Younger". After Raymond's death became known in Antioch, executive authority was initially assumed by Patriarch Aimery. Constance asserted her claim and independence, but–as a woman–could not lead an army in defense of the principality. She was compelled to remarry, choosing Reynald of Châtillon as her second husband and new prince in 1153.

William of Tyre writes that Raymond left Constance a widow with four young children–two sons and two daughters. The eldest was probably Philippa, named after Raymond's mother. The other daughter was Maria, possibly originally named Margaret, who became empress upon marrying Manuel I Komnenos. Constance's eventual successor was one of her sons by Raymond, Bohemond III. Another son of Constance, Baldwin, may have been fathered by either Raymond or Reynald. (Note: Alan V. Murray argues that Raymond is more likely to have been Baldwin's father. He finds it improbable that Baldwin could have commanded the Byzantine army in 1176, when he was killed, if he had not been born before Constance married Reynald. He also suggests that his name commemorated Baldwin of Marash.)

Raymond's close family and relationship with contemporary Latin leaders

Pons II of Toulouse
William IV of Toulouse	Raymond IV of Toulouse
William IX of Aquitaine	Philippa of Toulouse	Baldwin II of Jerusalem	Morphia of Melitene	Bertrand of Toulouse
Fulk V of Anjou	Melisende of Jerusalem	Alice of Jerusalem	Bohemond II of Antioch	Hodierna of Jerusalem	Raymond II of Tripoli
Baldwin III of Jerusalem	Amalric of Jerusalem	William X of Aquitaine	Raymond of Poitiers	Constance of Antioch
Eleanor of Aquitaine	Louis VII of France

== Assessment ==
The only primary source to give a personal assessment of Raymond is William of Tyre. Although William praises Raymond extensively, especially his abilities as a military leader, he also depicts him as impulsive and addicted to gambling, suggesting that these flaws contributed to crusader defeats at Shaizar and Inab. William's account influenced Steven Runciman, who is unique among modern historians in discussing Raymond's personality. Jonathan Phillips and Hans E. Mayer portray Raymond as primarily motivated the defence of his principality, while Jean Richard views him as more aggressive because of his invasions of Cilicia and northern Syria.

== Notes ==
Raymond of Poitiers House of Hauteville Born: 1128 Died: 1163
Regnal titles
Preceded by Constance	Prince of Antioch; 1136–1149; With: Constance	Succeeded by Constance
