= Andronikos Kontostephanos (son of Isaac) =

Andronikos Kontostephanos (Greek: Ἀνδρόνικος Κοντοστέφανος; fl. 1125–1156) was a Byzantine aristocrat and military commander.

Andronikos was the son of the pansebastos sebastos Isaac Kontostephanos, who served for most of the reign of Alexios I Komnenos (r. 1081–1118), culminating in his unsuccessful service as admiral (thalassokrator) against the Normans in 1107/8. In ca. 1125, he married Theodora, a daughter of Adrianos Komnenos (archbishop of Bulgaria between 1139/43 - 1157 under the name John IV), who was son of sebastokrator Isaac Komnenos and Irene of Alania. The couple had several children: the pansebastos sebastos John, attested in the synods of 1157 and 1166, Alexios, and at least two more anonymous children, of which one a daughter.

Amdronikos began his service as a military officer under Alexios I's son and successor, John II Komnenos (r. 1118–43). Although details are not known, he was sufficiently distinguished to earn the emperor's favour. His career is better attested under John's son, Manuel I Komnenos (r. 1143–80). In 1144, he commanded the campaign against Raymond of Antioch alongside his brother John, the general Prosouch, and the admiral Demetrios Branas, who led the fleet. The Byzantines rapidly recaptured the Cilician fortresses taken by Raymond, and advanced to the very outskirts of Antioch itself, which they plundered. As the Byzantine commanders started on their way back, Raymond approached with his army, in hopes of setting up an ambush, but was himself taken by surprise: informed of his presence with a small entourage near their encampment, the Byzantines launched an attack against both him and his main army. The latter withdrew quickly behind the walls of Antioch, and Raymond managed to return to his city only after nightfall.

Andronikos also took part in the 1156 campaign in southern Italy around Brindisi, but no details are known. He died sometime after that from an illness. Shortly before his death he was tonsured with the monastic name Antony. He was survived by his wife, his son John, and an anonymous daughter.

== Sources ==
- Gautier, Paul (1971). "Le synode des Blachernes (fin 1094). Etude prosopographique". Revue des études byzantines (in French). 29: 213–284. doi:10.3406/rebyz.1971.1445.
- Kazhdan, Alexander, ed. (1991). The Oxford Dictionary of Byzantium. Oxford and New York: Oxford University Press. ISBN 0-19-504652-8.
- Skoulatos, Basile (1980). Les personnages byzantins de l'Alexiade: Analyse prosopographique et synthèse [The Byzantine Personalities of the Alexiad: Prosopographical Analysis and Synthesis] (in French). Louvain-la-Neuve and Louvain: Bureau du Recueil Collège Érasme and Éditions Nauwelaerts.
- Varzos, Konstantinos (1984). Η Γενεαλογία των Κομνηνών [The Genealogy of the Komnenoi] (PDF) (in Greek). Vol. A1. Thessaloniki: Centre for Byzantine Studies, University of Thessaloniki.
