= Lordship of Marash =

Lordship in Cilicia from 1104 to 1149

The Lordship of Marash was a territorial lordship in northeastern Cilicia between 1104 and 1149, centred on the city of Marash (today Kahramanmaraş). One of the lesser Crusader states, it played a major role in the defence of the northern frontier in the 1130s and 1140s under Lords Geoffrey and Baldwin. Its position became untenable after the fall of Edessa in 1146.

== Primary sources ==
The lordship of Marash is mentioned in passing in the Arabic (Muslim) sources, such as Ibn al-Furat and Ibn al-Athir. Likewise, only one charter of a lord of Marash survives. Thus, the history of the lordship must be reconstructed almost entirely from Christian narrative sources in Armenian, Syriac, Greek and Latin. The most important of these is the Armenian Chronicle of Matthew of Edessa, continued from 1137 by Gregory the Priest. The Chronicle of the Kingdom of Little Armenia of Sempad the Constable also contains information. The Syriac Chronicle of Michael the Syrian and the anonymous Syriac Chronicle of 1234 are the next most valuable sources after Matthew of Edessa. The Syriac author Bar Hebraeus contributes a little. The most important Greek source is the Alexiad of Anna Komnene and its continuation after 1118 by John Kinnamos, while the most important Latin historians are Albert of Aachen, Ralph of Caen, Orderic Vitalis, Walter the Chancellor and William of Tyre.

== Background ==
Marash had a population of several thousand and an Armenian majority since at least the battle of Manzikert in 1071. It had an Armenian bishop and was the seat of an autonomous principality ruled by an Armenian general, Philaretos Brachamios, under the nominal suzerainty of the Byzantine Empire. On Philaretos' death in 1085, most of his territory was taken by the Seljuk Turks. Marash and its immediate environs, however, continued to be ruled by his sons.

Marash was a strategically important city, for it controlled a major pass through the Anti-Taurus Mountains. In the autumn of 1097, the armies of the First Crusade crossed by this route and stopped in Marash. They did not attempt to impose their own rule, but their presence allowed the Byzantines to appoint a governor, an Armenian named Thathoul. In 1097, one of the leaders of the First Crusade, Count Baldwin I of Edessa, married an Armenian woman known as Arda, who may have been the daughter of Thathoul.

The first crusaders to seize control of Marash were Prince Bohemond I of Antioch and Richard of the Principate, who invaded the territory and briefly occupied the city in 1100, according to Matthew of Edessa. Their rule was short-lived. They were captured by the Turks in an ambush in August 1100.

== History ==
=== Creation ===
In 1104, the Byzantine general Manuel Boutoumites occupied Marash during his campaign against the Principality of Antioch. He placed the general Monastros in charge of the city. When the latter was recalled, Thathoul returned to power and handed the city over to Joscelin of Courteny, lord of Turbessel in the County of Edessa. It appears that Thathoul, unable to defend the city, preferred to see it pass to Edessa rather than Antioch. Late in 1104, Joscelin was captured by the Turks at the battle of Harran. He remained their prisoner until 1108.

From the writings of Ibn al-Furat, it appears that one of Joscelin's vassals was give control of Marash during his lord's imprisonment. Tancred called on Marash for assistance when Ridwan of Aleppo invaded his country in 1105. The unnamed vassal is described as the lord of Marash and Joscelin's standard-bearer during the fighting between Joscelin and Prince Tancred of Antioch in 1108. By that year, however, Marash had passed to Richard of the Principate. The Chronicle of 1234 describes Richard as returning to "his own country, Marash", after his regency of Edessa came to an end in 1108, implying that he had already acquired Marash by then.

=== Vassal of Antioch ===
Richard held Marash as a vassal of Antioch. It is not clear how he acquired actual control, but he may have been appointed lord of Marash as early as 1100, when Bohemond briefly controlled it. There is no documentary evidence of Richard's title as lord of Marash, but Albert of Aachen calls him a prefect (praefectus). The territorial extent of the lordship is also unknown. After 1104, it seems to have functioned as the Antiochene counterpoise to the Edessene lordship of Turbessel. Richard supplied 60 knights and 100 infantry against the Turkish invasion of Antioch in September 1111.

Around the same time the lordship was established, Bohemond set up a Latin diocese of Marash subject to the Latin patriarch of Antioch.

Richard was probably dead by 1112, when his son Roger became regent of Antioch. Walter the Chancellor records that the lord of Marash died during an earthquake in 1114, but does not name him. This could have been Richard, but was more likely his successor. There is no evidence that the lordship was yet regarded as hereditary.

=== Armenian interlude ===
In the chaos that followed the earthquake, the Armenians reasserted themselves. In 1114–1115, according to both Bar Hebraeus and Ibn al-Athir, the city was ruled by the unnamed widow of Kogh Vasil, the Armenian ruler of Kesoun. In 1116–1118, Count Baldwin II of Edessa defeated the Armenians. The first indication that he restored the lordship of Marash is the reference to a steward (dapifer) of Marash named Arnulf, who died during Ilghazi's offensive in late 1119.

=== Geoffrey and Baldwin ===
In 1122, Baldwin II, now king, appointed Geoffrey the Monk as regent of the county of Edessa for the captured Joscelin of Courtenay. He may have already been the lord of Marash by 1119, when he had his own troops at the battle of the Field of Blood. On the other hand, Michael the Syrian seems to imply that he was granted lordship over Marash, Kesoun, Araban and Behesni by Baldwin II in 1122. Although his regency would end when Joscelin was freed, Geoffrey's lordship in Marash was probably a lifetime grant. Under him, Marash seems to have asserted its independence from Antioch. Both Matthew of Edessa and Orderic Vitalis call Geoffrey a count, but scholarship is divided as to whether this represents a real change in status. The territory of the lordship had been extended to cover much of the territory ruled by Kogh Vasil. Most sources record that Geoffrey died at the siege of Manbij in 1124, but William of Tyre places his death in 1131.

There is no record of the lordship between 1124 and 1136. In the latter year, Baldwin, the brother of Prince Raymond of Antioch, became lord. He was immediately attacked. Kesoun was besieged by the Danishmendids that year and Prince Leo of Armenia seized Servantikar. Baldwin requested aid from the Byzantines, which came in 1137–1138, and in return for which he may have done homage. He died during the siege of Edessa in 1146.

The only surviving charter issued by a lord of Marash is one of Baldwin's from the 1140s. It was witnessed by his wife; by steward of the County of Edessa; by his chaplain and scribe, named Arthur; and by ten of his vassals, men seemingly of European extraction who are named in reference to the villages they governed. In it, Baldwin grants an unidentified place named Platta to the Hospitallers. He confirmed the document with a seal and "is the only nobleman of the nonhern Syria region aside from the [rulers] of Edessa and Antioch known to have used one, a further mark of his high standing."

=== Conquest ===
Baldwin was succeeded by his brother Reynald, who was married to Agnes of Courtenay, daughter of Count Joscelin II. When Reynald died at the battle of Inab on 29 June 1149, Joscelin took control of the lordship in the name of his daughter. On 11 September 1149, the city fell to the Seljuk sultan Mesud I. Violating his own provision of safeconduct, he slaughtered the surrendered defenders.

== List of lords of Marash ==
- Joscelin I of Edessa (1104)
- unnamed (1104?–1108)
- Richard of the Principate (1108–1111/1112)
- unnamed? (d. 1114)
- Geoffrey the Monk (1122–1124/1131)
- Baldwin (1136–1146)
- Reynald (1146–1149)
- Joscelin II of Edessa (1149) on behalf of Agnes

== Lists of vassals of Marash ==
Baldwin's charter from the 1140s names eight of his vassals with reference to their fiefs:

- Fulco de Arniis
- Guiscardus de Lovilla
- Hugo de Rupe
- S. Jocee Vanaverii
- Raul de Archimonte
- Reginaldus de Seusia
- Terrisius dominus de Varterin
- Willelmus de Petra

Alan Murray notes that "in many cases it is impossible to identify toponymic surnames with places in either Syria or Europe, probably because they were originally written down in abbreviated form or became garbled intransmission."

== Bibliography ==
- Asbridge, Thomas (2000). The Creation of the Principality of Antioch, 1098–1130. The Boydell Press. ISBN 978-0-85115-661-3.
- Beech, George T. (1996). "The Crusader Lordship of Marash in Armenian Cilicia, 1104–1149". Viator. 27: 35–52. doi:10.1484/j.viator.2.301121.
- Buck, Andrew D. (2017). The Principality of Antioch and Its Frontiers in the Twelfth Century. Boydell Press.
- Cahen, Claude (1940). La Syrie du nord a l'époque des Croisades et la principauté d'Antioche. Geuthner.
- Cahen, Claude (1976). "Un épisode épico-féodal franc dans une chronique arabe". In Philippe Contamine (ed.). La Noblesse au Moyen Âge XI^{e}–XV^{e} siècles. Presses universitaires de France. pp. 129–132.
- Hamilton, Bernard (1980). The Latin Church in the Crusader States: The Secular Church. Ashgate.
- Murray, Alan V. (2019). "The Nobility of the Principality of Antioch, 1098–1187: Names, Origins and Identity". In Keith Stringer; Andrew Jotischky (eds.). The Normans and the 'Norman Edge': Peoples, Polities and Identities on the Frontiers of Medieval Europe. Routledge. pp. 162–190.
