= Reginald of Marash =

Crusader lord (died 1149)

Reginald

Lord of Marash
- Reign: 1146-1149
- Predecessor: Baldwin of Marash
- Died: 29 June 1149; Inab
- Spouse: Agnes of Courtenay

Reginald of Marash (died 1149) was the Lord of Marash from 1146 to 1149. He was the first husband of Agnes of Courtenay, who would later become queen consort of Jerusalem after his death. He was killed at the Battle of Inab in 1149, and Marash was captured months later.

== Early life and accession ==
According to Michael the Syrian, Reginald was the brother of his predecessor, Baldwin of Marash; Baldwin's chaplain and confessor, Basil the Doctor, wrote that he was the brother of Raymond of Poitiers, making him the son of William IX of Aquitane and Philippa of Toulouse. However, it is also possible that Baldwin and Reginald were illegitimate children of William.

In 1146, Baldwin of Marash and Joscelin II of Edessa would attempt to reclaim the County of Edessa during its second siege. Raymond of Poitiers refused to help his brother; according to the historian Steven Runciman, this was because "the expedition was ill-planned." The two faced a crushing defeat, and while Joscelin managed to escape to Samosata, Baldwin was killed, leaving Reginald to inherit the Lordship of Marash.

At an unspecified time, Reginald would marry Joscelin's daughter, Agnes of Courtenay, who was no older than fifteen.

== Death and aftermath ==
In 1149, Nur ad-Din would besiege the fortress of Inab with about 6,000 troops. On 29 June, he would surround and attack the crusaders, who suffered heavy casualties; both Reginald and Raymond of Poitiers were killed in the fight. Joscelin subsequently took control of Marash for his daughter, who enjoyed dowager rights there for a few months before it was captured.

== Sources ==
- Beech, George T. (1996). "The Crusader Lordship of Marash in Armenian Cilicia, 1104–1149". Viator. 27: 35–52. doi:10.1484/j.viator.2.301121.
- Runciman, Steven (1989) [1952]. The Kingdom of Jerusalem and the Frankish East, 1100–1187. A History of the Crusades. Vol. II. Cambridge University Press. ISBN 9780521061636.
- Nicholson, Robert L. (1973). Joscelyn III and the Fall of the Crusader States, 1134–1199. Brill.
- Hamilton, Bernard (2000). The Leper King and His Heirs: Baldwin IV and the Crusader Kingdom of Jerusalem. Cambridge University Press. ISBN 9780521017473.
- Gibb, Hamilton A.R. (1969). "The Career of Nur-ad-Din". In Baldwin, Marshall W. (ed.). A History of the Crusades. Vol. 1. The University of Wisconsin Press. pp. 513–527.
