= William IX of Aquitaine =

Duke of Aquitaine and Gascony and Count of Poitou (1071-1126)

William IX
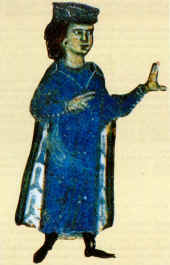
- Miniature of William from a 13th-century chansonnier now in the Bibliothèque nationale de France

Duke of Aquitaine
- Reign: 1086–1126
- Predecessor: William VIII
- Successor: William X
- Born: 22 October 1071; Poitiers
- Died: 10 February 1126 (aged 54); Poitiers
- Spouses: Ermengarde of Anjou; Philippa, Countess of Toulouse
- Issue: William X, Duke of Aquitaine; Raymond, Prince of Antioch; Agnes, Queen of Aragon
- House: Ramnulfids
- Father: William VIII, Duke of Aquitaine
- Mother: Hildegarde of Burgundy

William IX (Occitan: Guilhèm de Peitieus or Guilhem de Poitou, French: Guillaume de Poitiers; called the Troubadour; 22 October 1071 – 10 February 1126) was the Duke of Aquitaine and Gascony and Count of Poitou between 1086 and his death. He was also one of the leaders of the Crusade of 1101.

Though his political and military achievements have a certain historical importance, he is best known as the earliest troubadour—a vernacular lyric poet in the Occitan language—by whom some work survives. (Note: ... les poésies du premier troubadour, Guilhem de Poitiers ... ("the poems of the first troubadour, Guilhem de Poitiers").)

== Ducal career ==
William was the son of William VIII of Aquitaine by his third wife, Hildegarde of Burgundy. His birth was a cause of great celebration at the Aquitanian court, but the Church at first considered him illegitimate because of his father's earlier divorces and his parents' consanguinity. This obliged his father to make a pilgrimage to Rome soon after his birth to seek Papal approval of his third marriage and the young William's legitimacy.

=== Early career, 1088–1102 ===
William inherited the duchy at the age of fifteen upon the death of his father. It has been generally believed that he was first married in 1088, at age sixteen, to Ermengarde, daughter of Fulk IV of Anjou. Biographers have described Ermengarde as beautiful and well educated, though suffering from severe mood swings. However, Ruth Harvey's 1993 critical investigation shows the assumption of William's marriage to Ermengarde to be based largely on an error in a nineteenth-century secondary source and it is highly likely that Philippa of Toulouse was William's only wife. William married Philippa in 1094.

William invited Pope Urban II to spend the Christmas of 1095 at his court. The pope urged him to "take the cross" (i.e. the First Crusade) and leave for the Holy Land, but William was perhaps more interested in exploiting the absence on Crusade of Raymond IV of Toulouse, his wife's uncle, to press her claim to Toulouse; on a more practical level, he also had no heir at that time. He and Philippa did capture Toulouse in 1098, an act for which they were threatened with excommunication. The Duchess was an admirer of Robert of Arbrissel, and persuaded William to grant him land in northern Poitou to establish a religious community dedicated to the Virgin Mary. This became Fontevraud Abbey, which would enjoy the patronage of their granddaughter Eleanor and would remain important until its dissolution during the French Revolution.

Likely motivated by many factors, religious as well as secular, William joined the Crusade of 1101, an expedition inspired by the success of the First Crusade in 1099. To finance it, he had to mortgage Toulouse back to Bertrand, the son of Raymond IV. William arrived in the Holy Land in 1101 and stayed there until the following year. His record as a military leader is not very impressive. He fought mostly skirmishes in Anatolia and was frequently defeated. His recklessness led to his being ambushed on several occasions, with great losses to his own forces. In September 1101, his entire army was destroyed by the Seljuk Turks led by Kilij Arslan I at Heraclea; William himself barely escaped, and, according to Orderic Vitalis, he reached Antioch with only six surviving companions. (See Army of William IX on the Crusade of 1101.)

=== Conflict with Church and wife, 1102–1118 ===
William, like his father and many magnates of the time, had a rocky relationship with the Church. He was excommunicated twice, the first time in 1114 for an alleged infringement of the Church's tax privileges. His response to this was to demand absolution from Peter, Bishop of Poitiers. As the bishop was at the point of pronouncing the anathema, the duke threatened him with a sword, swearing to kill him if he did not pronounce absolution. Bishop Peter, surprised, pretended to comply, but when the duke, satisfied, released him, the bishop completed reading the anathema, before calmly presenting his neck and inviting the duke to strike. According to contemporaries, William hesitated a moment before sheathing his sword and replying, "I don't love you enough to send you to paradise."

William was excommunicated a second time for "abducting" the Viscountess Dangereuse (Dangerosa), the wife of his vassal Aimery I de Rochefoucauld, Viscount of Châtellerault. The lady, however, appears to have been a willing party in the matter. He installed her in the Maubergeonne tower of his castle in Poitiers (leading to her nickname La Maubergeonne), and, as related by William of Malmesbury, even painted a picture of her on his shield.

Upon returning to Poitiers from Toulouse, Philippa was enraged to discover a rival woman living in her palace. She appealed to her friends at court and to the Church; however, no noble could assist her since William was their feudal overlord, and whilst the papal legate Giraud (who was bald) complained to William and told him to return Dangerose to her husband, William's only response was, "Curls will grow on your pate before I part with the Viscountess." Humiliated, Philippa chose in 1114 to retire to the Abbey of Fontevrault. She did not survive there long, however; the abbey records state that she died on 28 November 1118.

=== Later career, 1118–1127 ===
Relations between the Duke and his elder son William also became strained—although it is unlikely that he ever embarked upon a seven-year revolt in order to avenge his mother's mistreatment, as Ralph of Diceto claimed, only to be captured by his father. Other records flatly contradict such a thing. Ralph claimed that the revolt began in 1113; but at that time, the young William was only thirteen and his father's liaison with Dangereuse had not yet begun. Father and son improved their relationship after the marriage of the younger William to Aenor of Châtellerault, Dangereuse's daughter by her husband, Aimery I de Rochefoucauld, Viscount of Châtellerault, in 1121.

In October 1119, Orderic Vitalis reports that the Countess of Poitou, whom he refers to as "Hildegarde," suddenly appeared at the Council of Reims being held by Pope Calixtus II and demanded that the Pope excommunicate William (again), oust Dangereuse from the ducal palace, and restore herself to her rightful place. The Pope postponed the case as William was not present to answer the charges. William was readmitted to the Church around 1120, after making concessions to it that may have included participating in the Reconquista efforts underway in Spain.

Between 1120 and 1123 William joined forces with the Kingdoms of Castile and León. Aquitanian troops fought side by side with Castilians in an effort to take Cordoba. During his sojourn in Spain, William was given a rock crystal vase by a Muslim ally that he later bequeathed to his granddaughter Eleanor. The vase probably originated in Sassanid Persia in the seventh century.

In 1122, William lost control of Toulouse, Philippa's dower land, to Alfonso Jordan, the son and heir of Raymond IV, who had taken Toulouse after the death of William IV. He did not trouble to reclaim it. He died on 10 February 1126, aged 54, after suffering a short illness. His nickname, "the Troubadour", was only applied in the nineteenth century. In contemporary documents, the only nickname he occasionally bears is "the Younger" to distinguish him from his father.

== Poetic career ==
William's greatest legacy to history was not as a warrior but as a troubadour—a lyric poet employing the Romance vernacular language called Occitan, or formerly Provençal.

He was the earliest troubadour whose work survives. Eleven of his songs survive (Merwin, 2002). The song traditionally numbered as the eighth (Farai chansoneta nueva) is of dubious attribution, since its style and language are significantly different (Pasero 1973, Bond 1982). Song 5 (Farai un vers, pos mi sonelh) has two significantly different versions in different manuscripts. The songs are attributed to him under his title as Count of Poitou (lo coms de Peitieus). The topics vary, treating sex, love, women, his own sexual and literary prowess, and feudal politics.

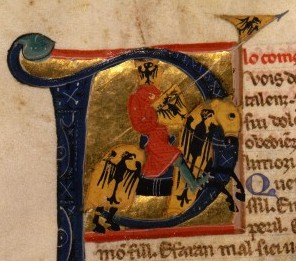
William from a 13th-century chansonnier

An anonymous 13th-century vida of William remembers him thus:

The Count of Poitiers was one of the most courtly men in the world and one of the greatest deceivers of women. He was a fine knight at arms, liberal in his womanizing, and a fine composer and singer of songs. He traveled much through the world, seducing women.

It is possible, however, that at least in part it is not based on facts, but on literal interpretation of his songs, written in first person; in Song 5, for example, he describes how he deceived two women.

In a striking departure from the typical attitude toward women in the period, William seems to have held at least one woman in particularly high esteem, composing several poems in homage to this woman, who he refers to as midons (master):

Every joy must abase itself,
and every might obey
in the presence of Midons, for the sweetness of her welcome,
for her beautiful and gentle look;
and a man who wins to the joy of her love
will live a hundred years.
The joy of her can make the sick man well again,
her wrath can make a well man die,

His frankness, wit, and vivacity caused scandal and won admiration at the same time. He is among the first Romance vernacular poets of the Middle Ages, one of the founders of a tradition that would culminate in Dante, Petrarch and François Villon. Ezra Pound mentions him in Canto VIII:

And Poictiers, you know, Guillaume Poictiers,
had brought the song up out of Spain
with the singers and viels ...

In Spirit of Romance Pound also calls William IX "the most 'modern' of the troubadours":

For any of the later Provençals, i.e., the high-brows, we have to ... 'put ourselves into the Twelfth Century' etc. Guillaume, writing a century earlier, is just as much of our age as of his own.

— Ezra Pound, cited in Bond 1982, p. lxxvi

William was a man who loved scandal and no doubt enjoyed shocking his audiences. In fact, William granted large donations to the church, perhaps to regain the pope's favour. He also added to the palace of the counts of Poitou (which had stood since the Merovingian era), later added to by his granddaughter Eleanor of Aquitaine and surviving in Poitiers as the Palace of Justice to this day.

One of William's poems, possibly written at the time of his first excommunication, since it implies his son was still a minor, is partly a musing on mortality: Pos de chantar m'es pres talenz (Since I have the desire to sing,/I'll write a verse for which I'll grieve). It concludes:

I have given up all I loved so much:
chivalry and pride;
and since it pleases God, I accept it all,
that He may keep me by Him.

I enjoin my friends, upon my death,
all to come and do me great honor,
since I have held joy and delight
far and near, and in my abode.

Thus I give up joy and delight,
and squirrel and grey and sable furs.

Orderic Vitalis refers to William composing songs (c. 1102) upon his return from the Crusade of 1101. These might be the first "Crusade songs":

Then the Poitevin duke many times related, with rhythmic verses and witty measures, the miseries of his captivity, before kings, magnates, and Christian assemblies.

== Family ==
In 1094, William married Philippa, the daughter and heiress of William IV of Toulouse. According to the Chronicle of Saint-Maixent, William and Philippa had two sons and five daughters, although it does not name them. His eldest son was his eventual successor, William X. His second son, Raymond, eventually became the Prince of Antioch in the Holy Land. A daughter, Agnes, married, firstly, Aimery V of Thouars, and then King Ramiro II of Aragon.

Armenian sources, Basil the Doctor and Gregory the Priest, imply that Baldwin of Marash was a son of William and Philippa, born shortly before the latter's retirement to a convent in 1114. Alternatively, he may have been an illegitimate son. Michael the Syrian reports that Reynald, Baldwin's successor as lord of Marash, was his brother.

== See also ==
- Duke of Aquitaine

== Sources ==
- Abel, Mickey (2012). "Emma of Blois as Arbiter of Peace and the Politics of Patronage". In Martin, Therese (ed.). Reassessing the Roles of Women as 'Makers' of Medieval Art and Architecture. Brill. pp. 823–864.
- Anglade, Joseph (1921). Grammaire de l'ancien provençal ou ancienne langue d'oc (in French). Librairie c. Klincksieck.
- Beech, George T. (1993). "The Ventures of the Dukes of Aquitaine into Spain and the Crusader East in the Early 12th Century". Haskins Society Journal. 5: 61–75.
- Beech, George T. (1996). "The Crusader Lordship of Marash in Armenian Cilicia, 1104–1149". Viator. 27: 35–52. doi:10.1484/j.viator.2.301121.
- Bogin, Meg (1980). The Women Troubadours. W. W. Norton and Company. pp. 37–38.
- Bouchard, Constance Brittain (2002). "Eleanor's divorce from Louis VII: The uses of Consanguinity". In Wheeler, B.; Parsons, John C. (eds.). Eleanor of Aquitaine: Lord and Lady. Palgrave Macmillan. pp. 223–236.
- Bouchard, Constance Brittain (2004). "The kingdom of the Franks to 1108". In Luscombe, David; Riley-Smith, Jonathan (eds.). The New Cambridge Medieval History. Vol. 4, c.1024 – c.1198, Part 2. Cambridge University Press.
- Gillingham, John (1999). Richard I. Yale University Press.
- Graham-Leigh, Elaine (2005). The Southern French Nobility and the Albigensian Crusade. The Boydell Press.
- Harvey, Ruth (1993). "The wives of the 'first troubadour', Duke William IX of Aquitaine". Journal of Medieval History. 19 (4). Elsevier: 307–325. doi:10.1016/0304-4181(93)90002-T.
- McDougall, Sara (2016). Royal Bastards: The Birth of Illegitimacy, 800-1230. Oxford University Press.
- Morby, John E. (1978). "The Sobriquets of Medieval European Princes". Canadian Journal of History. 13 (1): 1–16. doi:10.3138/cjh.13.1.1.
- Murray, Alan V. (2016). "Constance, Princess of Antioch (1130-1164): Ancestry, Marriages and Family". In Van Houts, Elisabeth (ed.). Anglo-Norman Studies XXXVIII: Proceedings of the Battle Conference 2015. The Boydell Press. pp. 81–96.
- William of Malmesbury (1999). Greenway, D.E.; Harvey, B.F.; Lapidge, M. (eds.). Gesta Regum Anglorum. Vol. 2. Clarendon Press.

William IX of Aquitaine House of Poitiers Born: 22 October 1071 Died: 10 February 1126
| Preceded by William VIII | Duke of Aquitaine; Count of Poitiers; 1086–1127 | Succeeded by William X |
