= Çakırhüyük, Besni =

Town in Adıyaman Province, Turkey

Çakırhüyük
- Municipality
- Location in Turkey
- Coordinates: 37.560°N 37.856°E
- Country: Turkey
- Province: Adıyaman
- District: Besni
- Population (2021): 2,210
- Time zone: UTC+3 (TRT)

Çakırhüyük (formerly known as Kaysun or Armenian: K'esun) is a town (belde) and municipality in the Besni District, Adıyaman Province, Turkey. Its population is 2,210 (2021).

The settlements of Abımıstık, Boybeypınarı, Köprübaşı, Levzin and Yeşilova are attached to the town. Abımıstık and Levzin are populated by Kurds of the Reşwan tribe.

== History ==
=== Antiquity ===
In Roman times, the town was known as Kessos and was situated on the road that led from Germanicea (modern Marash) to Samosata.

=== Early Medieval period ===
Kaysum as located at the Arab-Byzantine frontier between the seventh to tenth century

The town was conquered by the invading Arabs in the seventh century. In the ninth and tenth centuries, the town of Kaysun was part of the Abbasid province of Al-Jazira. In the early ninth century, while Dionysius of Tel Mahre was the Syriac Orthodox patriarch and a certain Theodoros bishop of Kaysun, the famous monastery of Jacob was built. The monastery held for some time a relic of Severus of Antioch, his right hand, until it was translated into the monastery of Qenneshre. Around 812, the local ruler Nasr ibn Shabath al-Uqayli rebelled against the Abbasid ruler al-Ma'mun and had the town fortified with a triple ring of walls. The town was then besieged by the Abbasids in October 823, and Ibn Shabath had to surrender; the walls were subsequently torn down.

The region was reconquered by the Byzantines by 966 and then fell to Armenians after the Seljuk invasions.

=== Armenian principality ===
The principality of Kogh Vasil was centered on Kaysun, who restored its fortification and built a palace in the town in the late 11th century. Under his rule, the town became the center of a local Armenian renovatio and Matthew of Edessa, who moved to Kaysun some time after 1116, promoted the town as a successor to the cultural and military glory of Ani.

Vasil intended to connect to ancient Armenian glory, and as such became a patron of the only surviving Armenian institution, that of the Armenian church. As such, he was able to convince first the Armenian Catholicos Gregory II and then Gregory's nephew and deputy Parsegh of Cilicia, who became the confessor of Vasil, to take up residence in Kaysun. Outside the town was the monastery of Karmir Vank (the Red Monastery) where Gregory III was consecrated as Catholicos in 1114/14 and the later Catholicos Nerses IV the Gracious was educated. The artist who painted the three domes of the White Monastery in Egypt in 1124, Theodore, is identified as a native of Kaysun. The town was severely damaged in the earthquake of 1114.

=== Frankish Rule ===
After an Armenian plot to hand over Edessa to Mawdud ibn Ahmad, the ruler of Mosul, failed, Baldwin II annexed Raban and Kaysun to the county of Edessa. The Catholicosate was moved thereafter to Covk to evade the increasing attacks of the Seljuks. Some time after that, the chronicler Matthew of Edessa settled in the town and by 1120, it was given as fief to Geoffrey of Marash. In the same year, an army of 133,000 men (likely exaggerated) under Ilghazi attacked Kaysun and its surrounding areas, burning many villages and enslaving much of the population. The settlement fell to Baldwin of Marash in the 1130s, who in turn appointed an Armenian called Vahram as governor of the town.

In 1131, the Danishmend Emir Gazi besieged the place in which Joscelin I, Count of Edessa had installed the Jacobite Patriarch of Antioch. Though Joscelin was dying at that time, he was carried on a litter ahead of his army to relieve the castle. Upon hearing news of Joscelin's approach, Emir Ghazi abandoned the siege. The Syriac Patriarch stayed in Kaysun for around 5 years. In 1134 the Seljuks Afshin and Mesud I pillaged the area and enslaved much of its population, with Mesud returning again to burn the surrounding villages. In 1136, the surrounding lands were ravaged first by Zengi's lieutenant Sawar and then the Danishmendid emir Muhammad Ghazi, who also burned down the Red Monastery of Kaysun. In 1140-1141 the residents of Kaysun temporarily fled from the area, as the Turks raided and burned it Baldwin, Lord of Marash, in whose dominion Kaysun was at this point, appealed to emperor Ioannes II Komnenos for aid and begun to refortify the walls in 1145 until his death at the siege of Edessa in 1146 interrupted the works. The funeral oration of Baldwin by a certain vardapet called Barsel was recorded by Gregory the priest, a resident of Kaysun.

=== Zengid Rule ===
In 1150, Kaysun was captured by Mesud I, who had allied with Nur ad-Din. In 1159, Nur ad-Din attacked, as agreed with the Byzantine emperor Manuel I Komnenos, the Rum Seljuks and captured Kaysun, Marash and Bahasha. The town was still under Nur ad-Din's control when the church unification talks between the Syriac Orthodox Christians Theodoros bar Wahbun and the Jacobite bishop of Keysun, John, took place with the Byzantine theologian Theodoros in 1172. After the Seljuks recaptured the city, Saladin moved in 1180 into the region in order to aid the Artuqid Nur al-Din Muhammad against the Seljuk sultan Kilij Arslan II, who then again destroyed the town walls and had the population deported.

== Diocese of Kaysun ==
During the Middle Ages, Kaysun had a bishop. A certain bishop called Iliyya wrote a short historic treatise, which was later used by Michael the Syrian in writing his chronicle. In January 1155 a synod in the monastery of Mor Bar Sauma united the diocese of Raban with that of Kaysun. Bishop Iwannis, who was also a known writer, was delegated by Michael the Syrian in 1170 to participate in the negotiations for Church union with the Byzantine Church.

In Kaysun there also existed the Red Monastery, from where several Syriac bishops such as Theodosios, metropolit of Damascus, and Yohannan, bishop of Kaysun, came from.

=== Syriac Orthodox Bishops ===
- Basil bar Shumna (? – 1143)
- Iwannis (1143 – Sept. 1171)

== Source ==
- Ambraseys, Nicholas N. (April 2004). "The 12th century seismic paroxysm in the Middle East: a historical perspective". Annals of Geophysics. 47 (2/3): 733–758.
- Blanke, Louise (30 August 2019). An Archaeology of Egyptian Monasticism: Settlement, Economy and Daily Life at the White Monastery Federation. Yale Egyptology. ISBN 978-1-950343-10-2.
- Clapp, James A.; Dadoyan, Seta B. (8 September 2017). The Armenians in the Medieval Islamic World: Armenian Realpolitik in the Islamic World and Diverging Paradigmscase of Cilicia Eleventh to Fourteenth Centuries. Routledge. ISBN 978-1-351-48576-0.
- Hewsen, Robert H. (2008). "Armenia Maritima: The Historical Geography of Cilicia". In Hovannisian, Richard G. (ed.). Armenian Cilicia. Costa Mesa. pp. 27–65.
- MacEvitt, Christopher (2007). "The Chronicle of Matthew of Edessa: Apocalypse, the First Crusade and the Armenian Diaspora". Dumbarton Oaks Papers. 61: 157–181.
- MacEvitt, Christopher (24 November 2010). The Crusades and the Christian World of the East: Rough Tolerance. University of Pennsylvania Press. ISBN 978-0-8122-0269-4.
- Pörtner, Rudolf (1980). Operation Heiliges Grab: Legende und Wirklichkeit der Kreuzzüge (1095-1187) (in German). Droemer Knaur. ISBN 978-3-426-03618-1.
- Runciman, Steven (1962). A History of the Crusades, Volume II: The Kingdom of Jerusalem and the Frankish East, 1100-1187. Cambridge University Press. ISBN 0-521-06162-8.
- Russel, James R. (2005). "The Credal Poem Hawatov Xostovanim ("I confess in faith") of St. Nerses the Graceful". In Ginkel, Jan J.; Murre-van den Berg, Hendrika Lena; Lint, Theo Maarten van (eds.). Redefining Christian Identity: Cultural Interaction in the Middle East Since the Rise of Islam. Peeters Publishers. pp. 185–236. ISBN 978-90-429-1418-6.
- Todt, Klaus-Peter; Vest, Andreas (2014). "Syria (Syria Prote, Syria Deutera, Syria Euphratsia)". Tabula Imperii Byzantini. 15. Österreichische Akademie der Wissenschaften.
- Vest, Bernd Andreas (2007). Geschichte der Stadt Melitene und der umliegenden Gebiete: vom Vorabend der arabischen bis zum Abschluss der türkischen Eroberung (um 600-1124) (in German). Dr. Kovač. ISBN 978-3-8300-2575-7.
