= Philippa of Toulouse =

Countess of Toulouse
- Reign: 1098–1101 and 1109–1114

Duchess consort of Aquitaine
- Reign: c. 1094 – c. 1116
- Born: c. 1073
- Died: 28 November 1118 (aged ~45); Abbey of Fontevrault
- Spouse: William IX, Duke of Aquitaine
- Issue: William X, Duke of Aquitaine; Raymond, Prince of Antioch; Agnes, Queen of Aragon
- House: Rouergue
- Father: William IV, Count of Toulouse
- Mother: Emma of Mortain

Philippa (French: Philippe; c. 1073 – 28 November 1118) was suo jure countess of Toulouse, as well as the duchess of Aquitaine by marriage to Duke William IX of Aquitaine.

== Life ==
=== Early life and marriage ===
Philippa was born in approximately 1073 to William IV, Count of Toulouse and his wife Emma, daughter of Robert, Count of Mortain. She was his only surviving child, and thus, by the laws of Toulouse, his heir. In 1088, William went on a pilgrimage to Palestine, leaving his brother Raymond of Saint-Gilles as regent. (Note: Before he left, it is claimed, he also married his daughter to the King of Aragon in order to disinherit her; however, this marriage is apocryphal, as contemporary evidence shows that Sancho was still married to his previous wife at the time of his death in 1094.)

Philippa's early life—if she was not married to Sancho Ramirez of Aragon—is something of a mystery. It is known that she did not marry William IX of Aquitaine until 1094, after the death of her father and the succession of her uncle; the circumstances in which she lived prior to her father's death, the manner of her disinheritance, and the arrangement of her marriage, are thus unknown. Those historians that argue her to have been married to Sancho Ramírez argue that her removal from Toulouse prevented her from effectively claiming her inheritance, and that with the death of Sancho, she was free to remarry based on her own choice. What is certain is that, upon the death of Count William, Philippa's claims were ignored, and Raymond became count.

=== Political life ===
When Raymond IV of Toulouse set out on the First Crusade in the autumn of 1096, he left his son Bertrand to rule the county. However, in the spring of 1098, William and Philippa marched into the city of Toulouse, and took control without a single life being lost. In the next year, she gave birth to her first child in the city: William the Toulousain.

In 1099, her husband went on crusade and he left her as regent in Poitou.

She was an admirer of Robert of Arbrissel and persuaded her husband to grant him land in Poitou to establish a religious community dedicated to the Virgin Mary. In 1100 he founded Fontevraud Abbey there.

She was stunned in 1100 when her husband mortgaged Toulouse to her cousin Bertrand in exchange for a vast sum of money, which the Duke used to go on Crusade himself. Philippa, removed from her home, was sent to his capital of Poitiers, from where she ruled Aquitaine on behalf of her husband whilst he was absent.

After William's return, he and Philippa for a time lived contentedly with each other. According to the Chronicle of Saint-Maixent, they had a further five daughters, including Agnes, and a son, Raymond. Eastern sources suggest that Baldwin of Marash and Reynald of Marash were Raymond's brothers. She also ignored the Duke's sexual boasting in song and talk, instead concentrating on religion (in particular the Abbey of Fontevrault, of which she remained a keen sponsor), especially the teachings of its founder, who preached the superiority of women over men. Her obsession with a doctrine considered offensive by many men of that time, combined with William's growing dissatisfaction with her, and his teasing of her (claiming to be founding an abbey of prostitutes), led to discord in the marriage.

Toulouse had been won back by William for his wife in 1113, following the death of Bertrand in Syria in 1112: his heir being his half-brother, the nine-year-old Alphonse-Jourdain, William had been unopposed. Thus, by 1114, Philippa was spending most of her time ruling there. Accordingly, she was less than pleased when, upon her return from Toulouse to Poitiers in 1114, she discovered her husband to have moved his mistress, Viscountess Dangereuse of Châtellerault, into her palace. Philippa appealed to friends and the church for assistance in ousting her husband's mistress, but to no avail—none could persuade the Duke to give up his mistress.

=== Later life ===
In 1116, a humiliated Philippa, devastated by her husband's repayment of her service to him for so many years, left the Court, taking refuge at the Abbey of Fontevrault. There she became a close friend of her husband's first wife, Ermengarde of Anjou. However, for all Philippa's devotion to the Abbey and its ideals, she found little peace there, both angry and resentful that her husband had cast her off in favour of a mistress. She died of unknown causes there on 28 November 1118, survived by her husband, his mistress, and Ermengarde, who would shortly attempt to avenge Philippa by attempting to have Dangereuse banished from Aquitaine.

== Sources ==
- Beech, George T. (1996). "The Crusader Lordship of Marash in Armenian Cilicia, 1104–1149". Viator. 27: 35–52. doi:10.1484/j.viator.2.301121.
- Doran, John; Smith, Damian J., eds. (2016). Pope Innocent II (1130-43): The World vs the City. Routledge.
- Graham-Leigh, Elaine (2005). The Southern French Nobility and the Albigensian Crusade. The Boydell Press.
- Hill, John Hugh; Hill, Laurita Lyttleton (1962). Raymond IV, Count of Toulouse. Syracuse University Press.

Regnal titles
Preceded by William IV	Countess of Toulouse; 1094	Succeeded by Raymond IV
Preceded by Raymond IV	Countess of Toulouse; 1098–1101	Succeeded by Bertrand
Preceded by Bertrand	Countess of Toulouse; 1112–1117	Succeeded by Alfonso Jordan
