= Agnes of Courtenay =

Noblewoman in Crusader Jerusalem (1136–1184)

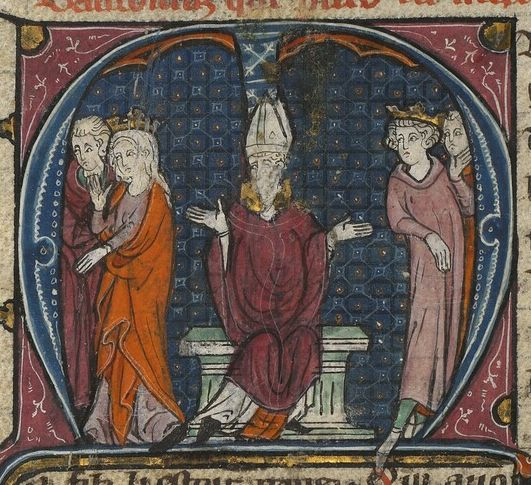
- The annulment of the marriage of Agnes and Amalric
- Born: c. 1136
- Died: c. 1184
- Spouse: Reginald of Marash; Amalric of Jerusalem; Hugh of Ibelin; Reginald of Sidon
- Issue: Sibylla of Jerusalem; Baldwin IV of Jerusalem
- House: House of Courtenay
- Father: Joscelin II of Courtenay
- Mother: Beatrice of Saone

Agnes of Courtenay (c. 1136 – c. 1184) was a Frankish noblewoman who held considerable influence in the Kingdom of Jerusalem during the reign of her son, King Baldwin IV. Though she was never queen, she has been described as the most powerful woman in the kingdom's history after Queen Melisende.

Agnes was of high birth but an impoverished young widow when she married Amalric of Jerusalem. They had two children, Sibylla and Baldwin. When Amalric unexpectedly inherited the crown in 1163, the High Court of Jerusalem refused to accept Agnes as queen and insisted that Amalric repudiate her. Agnes contracted two further advantageous marriages, to powerful noblemen Hugh of Ibelin and Reginald of Sidon successively.

Agnes's influence grew rapidly after Amalric died in 1174 and their teenage son, Baldwin IV, became king. Despite having been separated from him since his infancy, she became Baldwin's trusted advisor. Because he suffered from leprosy, he could not marry and was growing weaker. Agnes selected government officials and influenced succession by choosing husbands for both Sibylla and Isabella, Amalric's daughter by his second wife, Maria Comnena. She advised Baldwin to have Sibylla marry Guy of Lusignan, who thus became the king-in-waiting, and when Baldwin decided to disinherit Guy, Agnes convinced him and the nobility to crown Sibylla's son, Baldwin V, instead. The leper king died in early 1185; she died around the same time, possibly somewhat earlier.

Count Raymond III of Tripoli and the brothers Balian (second husband of Maria Comnena) and Baldwin of Ibelin were Agnes's chief contenders for power, and it is from sources close to them that nearly all information about Agnes is derived. She has consequently usually been criticized by historians as self-seeking, unscrupulous, and morally loose.

== Early life ==
Crusader states and their neighbors around the time of Agnes's birth

Agnes was born between 1134 and 1137. She hailed from the junior branch of the House of Courtenay. Her father, Count Joscelin II of Edessa, was the second cousin of Queen Melisende of Jerusalem, Princess Alice of Antioch, and Countess Hodierna of Tripoli, connecting her to all the Frankish Catholic rulers of the Latin East. Beatrice, her mother, held estates at Saone (in the Principality of Antioch) in dower as the widow of William of Zardana.

Agnes's first marriage, to Reginald of Marash, ended in his death at the Battle of Inab in 1149. They had had no children. Agnes enjoyed dower rights in Marash until the town was conquered by the Muslim Turks a few months later. They captured her father the following year and kept him in prison. Her mother found herself unable to defend the remnants of the County of Edessa and sold them to the Byzantine emperor, Manuel I Komnenos, for an annual pension to be paid to herself and her children, Agnes and Joscelin III. The mother and children then retired to Saone, where Agnes stayed until 1157.

== Royal marriage ==
In 1157, Agnes came to the Kingdom of Jerusalem, where she married Queen Melisende's younger son, Count Amalric, and became countess of Jaffa and Ascalon. Though she was penniless, historian Bernard Hamilton considers Agnes to have been the most suitable bride for Amalric in the crusader states due to her high birth. Yet the Latin patriarch of Jerusalem, Fulcher of Angoulême, objected and Hamilton suspects that the marriage was only conducted after his death in 1157. According to William of Tyre, Fulcher was upset by the couple's kinship, while the 13th-century Lignages d'Outremer states that Agnes had been betrothed to the lord of Ramla, Hugh of Ibelin, and that Amalric married her when she came to marry Hugh, irritating the patriarch. Historian Hans E. Mayer concluded that Agnes had already been married to Hugh in 1157, making her marriage to Amalric bigamous. His colleague Malcolm Barber has suggested that Amalric may have abducted Agnes. Hamilton disagrees, arguing that bigamy would have resulted in the excommunication of the couple. Agnes gave birth to a daughter, Sibylla, between 1157 and 1161. In 1161 she had a son, Baldwin.

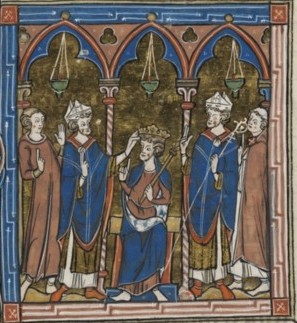
Late 13th-century depiction of Amalric's coronation

Upon the death of his brother, King Baldwin III, on 10 February 1163, Amalric stood to succeed to the throne of Jerusalem. Yet the High Court, composed of the bishops and barons of the Kingdom of Jerusalem, refused to recognize him as king unless he separated from Agnes. The reason for this request, which Hamilton considers unusual, is unclear because all the primary sources, including William of Tyre, are hostile to Agnes. Reasons proposed by scholars include a tarnished reputation of Agnes and fear of the barons that Agnes would bestow royal favor on the landless exiles from Edessa if she became queen. The High Court may also have that believed Agnes, like her mother-in-law, would wield power in the government or that Amalric could make a politically and financially better match; if so, they were to be proven right on both counts.

Amalric gave in to the High Court' demand; his and Agnes's marriage was annulled on the grounds of consanguinity. The reason was so flimsy that William of Tyre, who had been abroad at the time, had to ask Agnes's aunt Stephanie, abbess of St Mary Major, to explain it to him. The ecclesiastical court granted Amalric's request that their children, Sibylla and Baldwin, be legitimized, and that Agnes be absolved of any moral condemnation. Agnes was consequently never queen. She received no settlement, but did retain the prestigious title of countess, unique in the kingdom, for the rest of her life.

== Remarriages ==
Immediately after the annulment of the royal marriage, Agnes married Hugh of Ibelin, to whom she may have been engaged before meeting Amalric. Hamilton concludes from Agnes's ability to nearly instantly contract such an advantageous marriage that the High Court did not refuse to recognize her as queen due to a moral scandal. This marriage was likely arranged by Amalric, who benefited from no longer having to pay for his former wife's upkeep.

Agnes had little contact with her children after her separation from Amalric. Her son, Baldwin, was aged two; Hamilton believes that he grew up not knowing her and that they probably only saw each other on public occasions. Amalric only remarried in 1167, taking Emperor Manuel's grandniece Maria Komnene as his queen. The countess and the queen were on poor terms. Amalric's only surviving child with Maria was a daughter, Isabella. This proved troubling when Baldwin, his and Agnes's son, started showing signs of leprosy, which was then an incurable and much stigmatised illness.

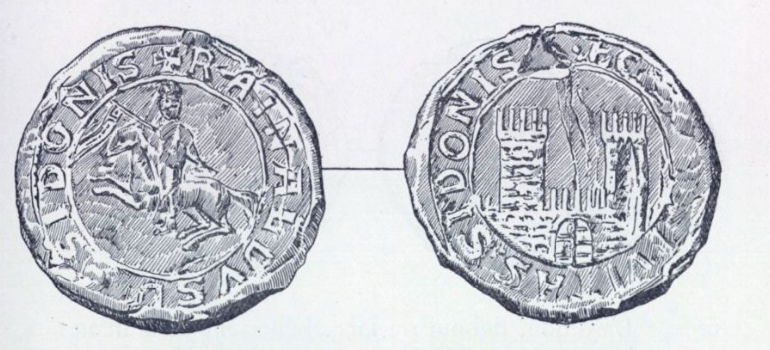
Seal of Reginald Grenier

Hugh died around 1169. Agnes then married her fourth and final husband, Reginald Grenier, who in 1171 succeeded his father, Gerard Grenier, as the lord of Sidon. Hamilton believes that the long-standing belief that Agnes and Reginald's marriage was dissolved at Gerard's request, and then presumably revalidated after Gerard's death, stems from the misunderstanding of Gerard's testimonial role in the dissolution of Agnes's marriage to Amalric.

== Son's accession ==
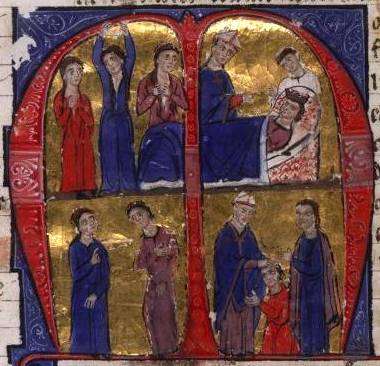
The death of Amalric and accession of Baldwin IV as depicted in the contemporary work of William of Tyre

King Amalric died after a short illness on 11 June 1174. The High Court agreed that there was no better candidate for new king than Agnes and Amalric's son, Baldwin IV, despite suspicions of leprosy. Being a minor, Baldwin needed a regent to rule on his behalf. The custom that the mother of the minor heir should govern on his or her behalf could not be applied in Baldwin's case: his mother, Agnes, was not the previous king's widow, while the previous king's widow, Queen Maria, was not the new king's mother. The High Court's ruling on that occasion that the right to regency belonged to the "nearest relation, male or female, on the mother’s side if the claim to the throne comes through the mother, or the nearest male relation on the father’s side if the claim to the throne comes through him" was entrenched into the law of the kingdom. Eventually it was Amalric's closest male kinsman, Count Raymond III of Tripoli, who claimed the regency.

Agnes returned to the royal court when Raymond became regent. This was probably requested by her husband, Reginald of Sidon, and Baldwin and Balian of Ibelin, brothers of her previous husband, Hugh, in return for their support of Raymond's regency. Raymond willingly shared the royal task of church patronage with Agnes: he made William of Tyre the new archbishop of Tyre in 1174, while she secured the appointment of Heraclius of Jerusalem to the archbishopric of Caesarea. Ernoul, a protegé of Amalric's Queen Maria, accuses Agnes of love affairs with Heraclius and Aimery of Lusignan, who was also on a steady rise to the highest position in the kingdom.

== Courtenay ascendancy ==
As the queen dowager, Maria, retired to her dower city of Nablus, Agnes's arrival at the court made her the queen mother in practice even if she was just a countess in title. She had to build a bond with an adolescent son who hardly knew her and though a great mutual affection developed between them, Hamilton believes that the relationship was likely more akin to that of aunt and nephew than to that of mother and son. Hamilton surmises that the young king was glad to have her back in his life and in charge of his household. Agnes came to strongly influence her daughter, Sibylla, as well.

In 1175, Agnes raised the funds to pay the ransom for her brother, Joscelin, who had been imprisoned by the Turks in Aleppo since 1164. Hamilton argues that Agnes could not have afforded the sum of 50,000 dinars and that it must have come from the royal treasury with the approval of the regent, Raymond. The following year, after Baldwin reached the age of majority and Raymond's regency ended, Agnes influenced Baldwin to name Joscelin to the vacant government post of seneschal. Hamilton believes that Joscelin, as an uncle with no claim to the throne, was a prudent choice; he proved both markedly competent and wholly loyal to the king.

=== Royal matchmaking ===
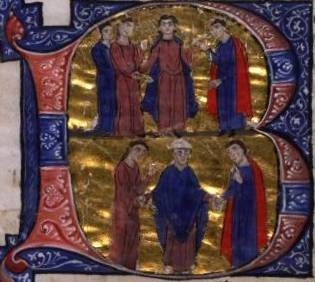
Baldwin IV betrothing Sibylla to Guy and Sibylla marrying Guy as depicted in Acre in the 13th century

When it became apparent that Baldwin IV was indeed affected by leprosy and therefore precluded from marrying and siring children, the question of the marriage of Agnes's daughter, Sibylla, became central to the royal government. Sibylla's first husband, William Longsword of Montferrat, died in 1177, leaving her with a son, Baldwin. In 1180, under unclear circumstances, Sibylla, by then the countess of Jaffa and Ascalon in her own right, married Guy of Lusignan, brother of Aimery. She was supposed to marry Duke Hugh III of Burgundy but, according to Ernoul, promised her hand to Baldwin of Ibelin on the condition that he paid his debt to the Muslim ruler of Egypt, Saladin. While Baldwin of Ibelin was in Constantinople procuring Emperor Manuel's help in raising these funds, Ernoul elaborates, Sibylla and Agnes were convinced by Aimery that Sibylla should marry his brother Guy instead. Hamilton rejects this account as romanticized Ibelin propaganda, and argues that neither Sibylla nor Agnes would have acted so foolishly.

William of Tyre tells about a coup attempt launched during the Holy Week in 1180 by Count Raymond III of Tripoli and Prince Bohemond III of Antioch; Hamilton concludes that they likely intended to depose Baldwin IV, install Sibylla, and have her marry a man of their own choosing (probably Baldwin of Ibelin), thereby removing the Courtenays from power. The king, acting on his mother's advice, foiled the coup by having Sibylla marry Guy. According to historian Steven Runciman, a division occurred already at the beginning of Baldwin's reign between, on one side, the native barons and the Hospitallers, who sought an understanding with their Muslim neighbours, and the "aggressive, militantly Christian" newcomers (such as the Courtenays) and Templars on the other side. Modern historians, including Bernard Hamilton and Peter Edbury, reject this traditional view. Hamilton holds that two distinct parties appeared only after Sibylla's marriage to Guy and centred on Baldwin IV's paternal relatives (Raymond of Tripoli, Bohemond of Antioch, and Maria Komnene and the Ibelins) and maternal relatives (Agnes and Reginald of Sidon, Sibylla and Guy, Joscelin, and Reginald of Châtillon), of whom the king supported the latter.

From 1180 to 1181, Agnes's brother, Joscelin, was on a diplomatic mission in Constantinople, leaving King Baldwin to conduct government alone. The young monarch's health was deteriorating, however, and during this time he particularly relied on his mother, Agnes. She accompanied him on military campaigns against Saladin and attended High Court meetings over which he presided. In October 1180, Baldwin had his younger half-sister, Isabella, daughter of Amalric by Maria Comnena, betrothed to Humphrey IV of Toron. Hamilton believes that this match too was Agnes's idea for she was the immediate beneficiary: the marriage contracted stipulated that Humphrey should give up his patrimonial fiefs of Toron and Chastel Neuf, which Baldwin then gave to Agnes. For the first time, Agnes was a great landowner in her own right. Balian, who had married Isabella's mother, Queen Maria, and his brother Baldwin of Ibelin were also thus prevented from using the young princess to conspire against Agnes's children.

Agnes's kinship with Amalric and the ruling families of Jerusalem, Antioch, and Tripoli,
with her partisans (blue rectangular) and opponents (red rounded)

Guy I of Montlhéry
Joscelin I of Courtenay	Isabella of Montlhéry	Melisende of Montlhéry	Hugh I of Rethel
Sister of Leo I of Armenia	Joscelin I of Edessa	Maria of Salerno	Baldwin II of Jerusalem	Morphia of Melitene
William of Saone	Beatrice of Saone	Joscelin II of Edessa	Stephanie of Courtenay	Melisende of Jerusalem	Fulk V of Anjou	Bohemond II of Antioch	Alice of Jerusalem	Hodierna of Jerusalem	Raymond II of Tripoli
Joscelin of Courtenay	Baldwin III of Jerusalem	Agnes of Courtenay	Amalric of Jerusalem	Maria Komnene	Balian of Ibelin	Stephanie of Milly	Reginald of Châtillon	Constance of Antioch	Raymond III of Tripoli
William of Montferrat	Sibylla of Jerusalem	Guy of Lusignan	Baldwin IV of Jerusalem	Isabella I of Jerusalem	Humphrey IV of Toron	Bohemond III of Antioch
Baldwin V of Jerusalem

=== Height of power ===
Map of the fiefs in the Kingdom of Jerusalem

Agnes was at the height of her power during Baldwin IV's personal rule. Raymond and the Ibelins were in no position to challenge the countess and her party: her husband ruled Sidon; her son held the great royal cities of Jerusalem, Tyre, and Acre; her daughter and son-in-law ruled the county of Jaffa and Ascalon; her supporter Reginald of Châtillon was lord of Oultrejordain and Hebron; and she was newly landed herself. In 1182, Raymond found that her influence was such that she was able to refuse him entry into the kingdom. Agnes won another victory the same month when she persuaded her son to select Heraclius over William to become the new Latin patriarch of Jerusalem. Runciman accepts Ernoul's account of Heraclius as a "barely literate priest from the Auvergne whose good looks Agnes had found irresistible", but Hamilton argues that Heraclius was "learned, energetic, and ... a resourceful diplomat" and that the countess's choice was not irresponsible.

Having become blind and crippled, Baldwin IV appointed Sibylla's husband, Guy, to rule as regent in 1183. This was, effectively, Baldwin's endorsement of Guy as his future successor. Agnes was not threatened because Guy owed his position to her and she held sway over Sibylla. Baldwin, however, soon became disillusioned with Guy's character and capability and decided to depose him from the regency in late 1183 at a council convened to deal with Saladin's siege of Kerak, where Isabella was marrying Humphrey. The council was attended by Agnes, Guy, Raymond of Tripoli, Bohemond of Antioch, Reginald of Sidon, and the Ibelin brothers.

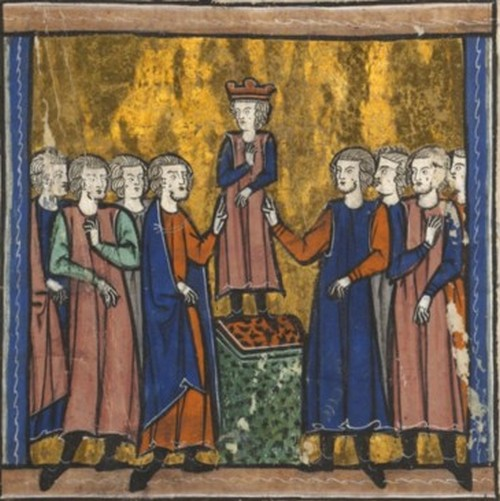
Homage to Agnes's grandson, Baldwin V (crowned, centre)

The council presented an opportunity to the countess's opponents for the next best candidate for regency (and thus eventual kingship) was her enemy, the count of Tripoli. Agnes offered a compromise solution which the assembled nobility accepted: the king should rule personally rather than appoint a regent (which guaranteed the prolongation of Agnes's influence) but should also designate an heir to exclude Guy from kingship. The champions of Sibylla's claim, Reginald of Châtillon and Joscelin, were defending Kerak; and Isabella's claim could not be entertained as she was besieged. Raymond may have hoped to present himself as the suitable heir; if so, the countess thwarted his plan by proposing her grandson, Baldwin V, Sibylla's son by William of Montferrat, and the boy was duly crowned. The countess was unable to prevent her son from further going after Guy nor did she intervene in the king's attempt to separate Sibylla from Guy in early 1184.

== Death ==
The last source to mention Countess Agnes as living is Ibn Jubayr. He passed by Toron in September 1184 and remarked, in the language commonly used by Muslims of the time when referring to Christians, that the area "belongs to the sow known as queen who is the mother of the pig who is lord of Acre–may God destroy it".

Historian Hans Eberhard Mayer argues that Agnes died before 1 February 1185 because she took no part in the selection of regent for Baldwin V. Baldwin IV died soon after, leaving Baldwin V as the sole king and Raymond as regent once again. If she was still alive, Agnes's influence diminished but did not end, as the boy king was under the guardianship of her brother, Joscelin. Baldwin V's death in mid-1186 caused a succession crisis in which Agnes played no part; on 21 October, Guy, now king after all, acknowledged that Joscelin had satisfactorily executed his sister's last will. The Kingdom of Jerusalem was conquered by Saladin following the Battle of Hattin in 1187. Sibylla and the rest of her children died in 1190, leaving Isabella I as the heir to the defeated kingdom.

== Appearance and character ==
Judging by her ability to make excellent matches for herself while virtually impoverished, historian Bernard Hamilton surmises that Agnes must have been attractive. He similarly concludes that the resentment she caused among her peers points to a force of her character. In her rise from a powerless repudiated wife to the person who selected husbands for both potential heiresses and who appointed chief lay and ecclesiastical officeholders in the kingdom he sees evidence of "clearly a remarkably clever woman".

The "bad press" she received during her lifetime has led to historians traditionally describing her as unscrupulous and opportunistic. Steven Runciman, for example, calls her "vicious and greedy, insatiable for men and for money" and her influence "disastrous". The view that she exploited her son's illness to fill the court with corrupt officials at the expense of capable men comes from William of Tyre, who never forgave her for her role in his defeat in the patriarchal election; he calls her a "woman who was relentless in her acquisitiveness and truly hateful to God". Ernoul, whose information about Agnes is derived from her husband's second wife, Maria, is likewise very hostile and portrays her as a woman of loose morals. Hamilton argues that Agnes's kindness and devotion to her sick son would have earned her praise from less hostile witnesses.

Hamilton judges Agnes as a "worthy daughter-in-law of Queen Melisende", if not as pious, and argues that Agnes had a more pronounced influence on the history of the Jerusalem-centred kingdom than any woman other than Melisende.

== Sources ==
- Barber, Malcolm (2012). The Crusader States. Yale University Press. ISBN 978-0300189315.
- Hamilton, Bernard (1978). "Women in the Crusader States: The Queens of Jerusalem" (PDF). In Derek Baker (ed.). Medieval Women. Ecclesiastical History Society.
- Hamilton, Bernard (2000). The Leper King and His Heirs: Baldwin IV and the Crusader Kingdom of Jerusalem. Cambridge University Press. ISBN 9780521017473.
- Runciman, Steven (1989) [1952]. A History of the Crusades: The Kingdom of Jerusalem and the Frankish East, 1100-1187. Vol. 2. Cambridge University Press. ISBN 0241298768.
