= Battle of Manbij (1124) =

- Part of the Crusades
Date	5 May 1124
Location	Manbij, Syria
Result	Artuqid victory

Belligerents
County of Edessa	Artuqids

Commanders and leaders
Joscelin I Geoffrey the Monk †	Belek Ghazi

Strength
Unknown	Unknown

Casualties and losses
Heavy, prisoners executed	Unknown

The Battle of Manbij was a military engagement between the Crusader army of the County of Edessa and the Artuqid Turks near the city of Manbij. The Crusaders attempted to raise a siege by Belek Ghazi but were routed.

== Background ==
After the capture of King Baldwin II of Jerusalem and Joscelin I, Count of Edessa, by Belek Ghazi, both prisoners were held in Harpoot. Joscelin was able to escape with the help of Armenian infiltrators. However, Baldwin failed to escape and was captured by Belek. Belek had the Armenian infiltrators flayed alive. Joscelin returned to the Crusader states and gathered an army to launch a raid against Belek's territory. Joscelin's raid was ruthless; he destroyed mosques, tombs, and everything on his way. He also attacked Turkomen tribes, seized their cattle, and inflicted atrocities on trading caravans. Learning of Joscelin's attack, Belek went to meet him; his presence forced Joscelin to retreat.

Having dealt with the Crusader attack, Belek turned his attention towards the governor of Manbij. Belek dispatched his cousin, Timurtash, with an army to Manbij and invited its ruler, Hasan, to participate in an attack on Tell Bashir. Hasan agreed, and Timurtash was allowed to enter the city. However, Hasan's brother Isa refused entry to Timurtash, who had then imprisoned Hasan. Isa was then besieged in the citadel. Isa asked Joscelin for help, promising him to cede Manbij if he were to push Belek's army. He agreed, as he wanted to meet Belek in battle.

== Battle ==
Learning of the relief Crusader army, Belek abandoned the siege and went to meet them. Near Manbij, both armies met on May 5, 1124. Joscelin and Geoffrey the Monk led the Crusader army. Initially the Crusader army had the advantage. They managed to rout a Turkish wing. Joscelin and his troops also managed to rout another Turkish wing. However, the Crusaders led by Geoffrey were surrounded and massacred. Many were killed, including Geoffrey and other princes. Learning of this, the Crusaders were forced to retreat and take refuge in Tell Bashir.

== Aftermath ==
Belek was victorious; the Crusaders who fell prisoner were executed. Belek then resumed the siege. However, on the next day, Belek was shot and killed by an arrow from the besiegers. Timurtash raised the siege and succeeded Belek as the Artuqid ruler of Aleppo. The death of Belek forced Timurtash to release Baldwin in exchange for Azaz and a large ransom. Baldwin agreed, and on August 24 he was freed. Baldwin, however, broke the agreement and instead allied with Dubais ibn Sadaqa from Banu Mazyad to capture Aleppo.
