= 1114 Marash earthquake =

1114 earthquake in Marash, Turkey

- Location within Turkey
- Local date: November 29, 1114
- Magnitude: ≈7.8 M_{w}, 7.7 M_{s}
- Epicenter: 37.90°N 36.97°E
- Max. intensity: EMS-98 IX (Destructive)
- Casualties: 40,000 (Marash); tens of thousands (Sis); 400 (Azaz)

An earthquake occurred in the area of Marash during the early morning hours of November 29, 1114. It had an estimated surface-wave magnitude between 7.4 and 7.7 and an epicenter location in modern-day Turkey. The mainshock was preceded by two destructive foreshocks in August and November that same year. At least 40,000 people were killed in the earthquake; a number contested by historians due to the small population in the area at the time. These earthquakes were associated with seismic activity on the East Anatolian Fault.

== Earthquake ==
The magnitude was estimated at 7.4–7.7 M_{s} and assigned a maximum EMS-92 intensity of IX. The calculated moment magnitude was similar to that of the 6 February 2023 earthquake which measured M_{w} 7.8. Due to the similar extent of damage to the 2023 earthquake, it is considered a predecessor to the later event. The moment magnitude was also inferred to be similar because of the damage reports.

The mainshock and its foreshocks were associated with seismic activity along the East Anatolian Fault. The seismic rupture length was estimated at 330 km (210 mi) on two segments of the fault. Two large foreshocks were documented on 10 August and 13 November the same year. The 10 August foreshock destroyed several costal and fortified cities although unnamed and considered by historians as rhetoric. Marash was partly destroyed and all surrounding towns were levelled by the 13 November earthquake. There were many deaths in the region associated with the 13 November foreshock. At Antioch, large fissures occurred, causing buildings to settle into the ground.

== Damage and casualties ==
Marash was an important city with a large Christian population at that time. According to the contemporary sources, the city was completely underground. Matthew of Edessa records that no one living in the city survived the earthquake and that about 40,000 people living in Marash died. That number seems excessive since the population of the town is estimated to have been a few thousand only. Another estimate for the city's population suggested 24,000 residents. Michael the Syrian records that the city of Marash is a tomb for its own people. Al-Azimi records that it was dark before the earthquake, and then it snowed and covered with snow on all sides. Apart from Marash, the earthquake also caused destruction in Elbistan, Sis, Mopsuestia, Keysun, Sümeysat (Samsat), Hısn-ı mansûr (Adıyaman), Raban, Edessa, Antioch, Harran, Aleppo, Azaz, Esârib, Zerdana and Balis. The earthquake caused the thirteen towers of the Edessa city wall and a part of the Harran city wall to collapse. While many monasteries and villages were destroyed in the city of Sis, tens of thousands of people died. It also destroyed the Azez fortress and caused the death of four hundred people. William of Tyre also records that this earthquake caused the most damage in the coastal region of Cilicia, Isauria, and Northern Syria. The lord of Marash and the bishop of Marash, although both unnamed in sources, were killed in the earthquake.

Walter the Chancellor who was in Antioch documented many city residents sought refuge in tents built on courtyards, gardens, groves and abandoned dwellings. Fulcher of Chartres reported most houses in towns around the Antioch region were razed to the ground, killing its residents. According to Ibn al-Qalanisi, many residents of Damascus were frightened. In the history book The Complete History by Ibn al-Athīr, he wrote about widespread destruction and fatalities in Al-Ruha, Harran, Samsat, Balis and other areas. The city of Mopsuestia was also partly destroyed. Damage in Aleppo was limited to some collapsed homes in the city center and upper district where some residents died. A tower at the north gate of Aleppo, Atarib and Azaz fort were badly damaged.

== Sources ==
- Sünbül, Fatih; Sünbül, Ayşe Bengü (1 June 2018). "Deprem Etkileşimlerinde Coulomb Gerilme Kriteri Değerlendirmesi; Doğu Anadolu Fay Hattı" [Evaluation of Coulomb Stress Criteria in Earthquake Interactions; East Anatolian Fault Line]. Karaelmas Fen ve Mühendislik Dergisi (Research Article) (in Turkish). 8 (2). Zonguldak Bülent Ecevit University: 523–535. doi:10.7212/zkufbd.v8i2.1166. eISSN 2146-7277. ISSN 2146-4987. S2CID 165588705.
