= Principality of Pir =

Medieval Armenian principality

- 1086–1099/1100
- Common languages: Armenian
- Religion: Armenian Apostolic Church
- Historical era: High Middle Ages
- 1086–1099/1100
  - Established: 1086
  - Disestablished: 1099/1100
- Today part of: Syria; Turkey

The Principality of Pir (1086–1099/1100) was a small independent Armenian principality at the Euphrates River in the Near East.

== History ==
In the second half of the 11th century, following the invasion of Turkic tribes in Armenia and the Byzantine annexation of Armenian lands, there was increased Armenian migration out of the Transcaucasus region to the northern part of the Near East. As a result, several independent Armenian principalities were formed. One of them was the principality of Pir, which was founded by Abelkharib Pahlavuni in 1086. However, this state was short-lived as when Crusaders appeared in the region, they formed the County of Edessa and occupied the Pir principality, expelling his founder in the process.
