= Joscelin II of Edessa =

Count of Edessa from 1131 to 1146

Joscelin II
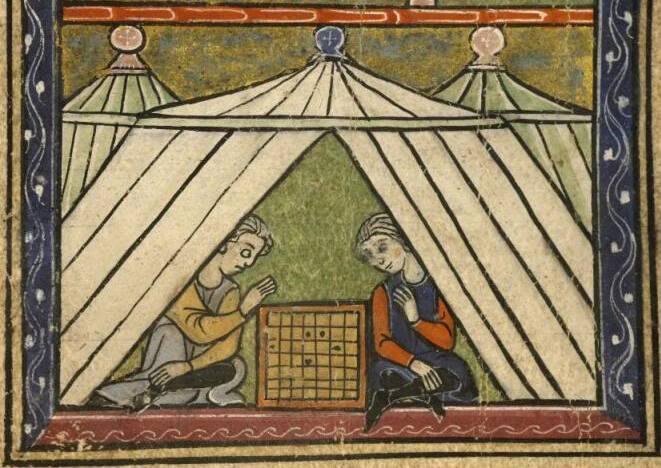
- Joscelin and Raymond of Poitiers playing with dice in 1138

Count of Edessa
- Reign: 1131–1150
- Predecessor: Joscelin I
- Successor: Joscelin III (titular count)
- Born: c. 1113
- Died: 1159 (aged 45–46); Citadel of Aleppo, Aleppo
- Spouse: Beatrice of Saone
- Issue: Agnes of Courtenay; Joscelin III of Edessa; Isabella of Courtenay
- House: Courtenay
- Father: Joscelin I of Edessa
- Mother: Beatrice of Armenia
- Religion: Catholicism

Joscelin II or Joscelyn II, sometimes known as Joscelin the Younger and Joscelin of Courtenay (French: Jocelyn or Josselin; c. 1113 – May 1159) was the fourth and last ruling count of Edessa. He succeeded his father, Joscelin I, after the latter died from wounds sustained in battle. He initially supported Princess Alice of Antioch for the regency over her daughter, Constance, as part of his opposition to King Fulk of Jerusalem. Relations with Fulk were restored after Joscelin's allies were defeated at Chastel Rouge. Joscelin and Fulk won the Battle of Qinnasrin in 1133, and Joscelin competed with the Zengids in the early 1130s.

Byzantine emperor John II Komnenos intervened in the northern Crusader states starting from 1137, extracting the fealty of Joscelin, Raymond of Poitiers, and Raymond II of Tripoli. Joscelin and Raymond of Poitiers refused to cooperate during John's campaign against the fortress of Shaizar in 1138, leading to its ultimate failure. Joscelin continued to undermine Raymond, but Raymond achieved overlordship over Joscelin in 1140. When John returned in 1142 he threatened to invade the Principality of Antioch, but he died the next year.

Imad al-Din Zengi renewed his conflict with Joscelin during 1143–1144 and invaded the County of Edessa. He seized Edessa itself, and then captured Saruj before stopping at Birejik, leaving Joscelin with a rump state west of the Euphrates. Joscelin attempted to reclaim Edessa after Zengi died in 1146, and seized the city. He was unable to take the citadel, and Zengi's son Nur ad-Din destroyed his army. Nur ad-Din captured Joscelin in 1150 and Joscelin died imprisoned in 1159.

== Early life ==
Joscelin's father, Joscelin I, had been the lord of Turbessel as the vassal of his cousin Baldwin of Bourcq, the count of Edessa. In 1104, he married Beatrice, daughter of the Armenian ruler Constantine, to consolidate his position. Baldwin captured Joscelin and deprived him of his fief in 1113, forcing him to travel to the Kingdom of Jerusalem, where King Baldwin I enfeoffed him with the Principality of Galilee. There he and Beatrice had Joscelin II. At the time of Baldwin I's death in 1118, the elder Joscelin was one of the most influential and respected Jerusalemite nobles. Using his influence, he helped bring Baldwin of Bourcq to the throne, and in exchange the new king enfeoffed him with Edessa.

In 1122, Belek Ghazi captured Count Joscelin, and the next year King Baldwin II joined him in captivity. Joscelin was rescued by fifty Armenian soldiers in May 1123. Baldwin was traded as prisoner for his daughter Ioveta and Joscelin II in 1124. Joscelin I, Baldwin, and Pons of Tripoli defeated Aqsunqur al-Bursuqi at the Battle of Azaz in 1125. With the loot of the battle, Baldwin was able to ransom Joscelin II and Ioveta. In 1131, Joscelin I was mortally wounded while besieging a castle northeast of Aleppo, as part of a larger campaign against Imad al-Din Zengi. Upon learning that the Turkish ruler Emir Gazi of the Danishmendids was besieging the castle of Kaisun, the count ordered his son to break the siege. As the Edessene army was small, Joscelin refused, and his father opted to be carried on a stretcher by his men and taken to Kaisun. Gazi raised the siege, and Joscelin I died shortly after.

== Reign ==
=== First years ===
The crusader states around 1135

The deaths of Joscelin I and Baldwin II around the same time caused a political shift in the crusader states. Baldwin's son-in-law and successor, Fulk, commanded less influence in the crusader states than Baldwin had. In 1132, Princess Alice of Antioch launched a second bid for the regency of her daughter, Constance. After her first attempt in 1130, Joscelin I had governed Antioch, but the Antiochene nobles would not install Joscelin II in his father's place. Alice allied with Joscelin and Pons, neither of whom accepted King Fulk's overlordship. An opposing faction of barons requested Fulk's aid, and Fulk went by sea to Saint Symeon. Fulk defeated the rebels at Chastel Rouge and restored order in the principality.

Edessa was able to stay more front-footed than Antioch in the early 1130s. Sawar, Zengi's lieutenant in Aleppo, prepared to campaign against Antioch in 1133. In response, Joscelin allied with Fulk, and the two confronted Sawar at the Battle of Qinnasrin. Sawar was lured into a wide, open plain, and his army was routed with a cavalry charge. Nicholas Morton suggests that Joscelin proposed the plan, given Fulk's otherwise lackluster record. The two then raided Aleppan territory. However, Sawar defeated an Edessan raiding party in 1134.

Joscelin intended to seize Manbij. By 1134, he had appointed a Frankish-archbishop for the still-unconquered city, had seized multiple castles in the vicinity, and was able to make land grants in the area to the Abbey of Saint Mary of Jehoshaphat. Fulk left in 1135 to deal with Alice once again, and Sawar attacked Turbessel, Aintab, and Azaz in his absence. Timurtash seized Edessene territory further east. Michael, the lord of Gargar, granted his town to Joscelin for its defence, and Joscelin handed the town to Michael's personal enemy, Basil. Fighting broke out between the two and the countryside was raided. Sawar's lieutenant, Afshin, threatened Marash and Kaisun in April 1136.

=== Rivalry with Antioch and Byzantium ===
Raymond of Poitiers, the new prince of Antioch, secured his northern flank by marching against Joscelin's uncle Leo I of Cilicia. Raymond was allied with Baldwin of Marash, who was Joscelin's vassal. Joscelin sided with Leo and they repulsed Raymond's expedition. Fighting continued until 1137. In 1137, Fulk intervened again in the County of Tripoli, which was threatened by the Zengi. The army was ambushed in the mountains and while Count Raymond II was captured, Fulk sought refuge in Montferrand. Joscelin, Raymond of Poitiers, and Patriarch William of Jerusalem rushed to Fulk's aid, but when they arrived he had already surrendered Montferrand and 50,000 dinars for his freedom, unaware of the coming relief. Raymond attempted to exile Ralph of Domfront, the patriarch of Antioch, and Joscelin allowed Ralph to stay in Edessa, where Archbishop Hugo received Ralph as a spiritual overlord.

The recent Frankish defeats led to an invasion of Antioch by Byzantine emperor John II Komnenos. Joscelin, Raymond of Poitiers, and Raymond of Tripoli all swore fealty. John then completed his conquest of Cilicia, at which point Baldwin of Marash came to him and paid homage for military protection. Joscelin's submission is neglected by Byzantine chroniclers, as he ruled the weakest crusader state, but was prescribed in the Treaty of Devol from 1108. John launched a military campaign alongside Joscelin and Raymond of Poitiers into enemy territory in 1138, occupying Balat and Bizaah. The allies came to Aleppo, but lacking water and finding the defences too strong, they passed it. They then captured Atarib and Kafartab, but upon reaching Shaizar, progress ceased. John besieged the city, but his allies held back. Success here would contribute to Byzantine influence in the region, while Raymond did not want to lose Antioch in exchange for Shaizar, a condition of his submission. Joscelin disliked Raymond and the potential of him being installed in Shaizar and later Aleppo. Reportedly, Joscelin and Raymond played dice while John attacked Shaizar.

John returned to Antioch and demanded the citadel be handed over to him. In response, Joscelin instigated a riot in Antioch, forcing the emperor to withdraw. The Artuqids and Zengi attacked Edessa in the wake of John's campaign. Michael the Syrian records that the Edessans raised an army in response of 300 knights and 4000 infantry, but they were ambushed and suffered heavy losses. The county was raided by the Artuqid rulers, Timurtash and Da'ud. The Principality of Antioch faced the brunt of the attack, losing multiple frontier fortresses. Edessa was comparatively peaceful between 1138 and 1142, and in the latter year, Joscelin felt safe enough to undergo a pilgrimage to Jerusalem. In 1139, Raymond was finally able to depose Ralph, who died in 1142. Based on the wording of Joscelin's charters, Raymond seems to have been his overlord since around 1140.

John returned in 1142 at the head of another large army, but suddenly turned northwards from Cilicia and appeared before Joscelin's seat at Turbessel. Due to the count's actions in 1138, the emperor seems to have distrusted him. Joscelin was surprised and had to hand over one of his daughters as a hostage. Raymond refused John's demand for Antioch and the emperor plundered its suburbs before retreating to Cilicia for the winter. Before he could return, he died in a hunting accident in April 1143.

=== Sieges of Edessa ===
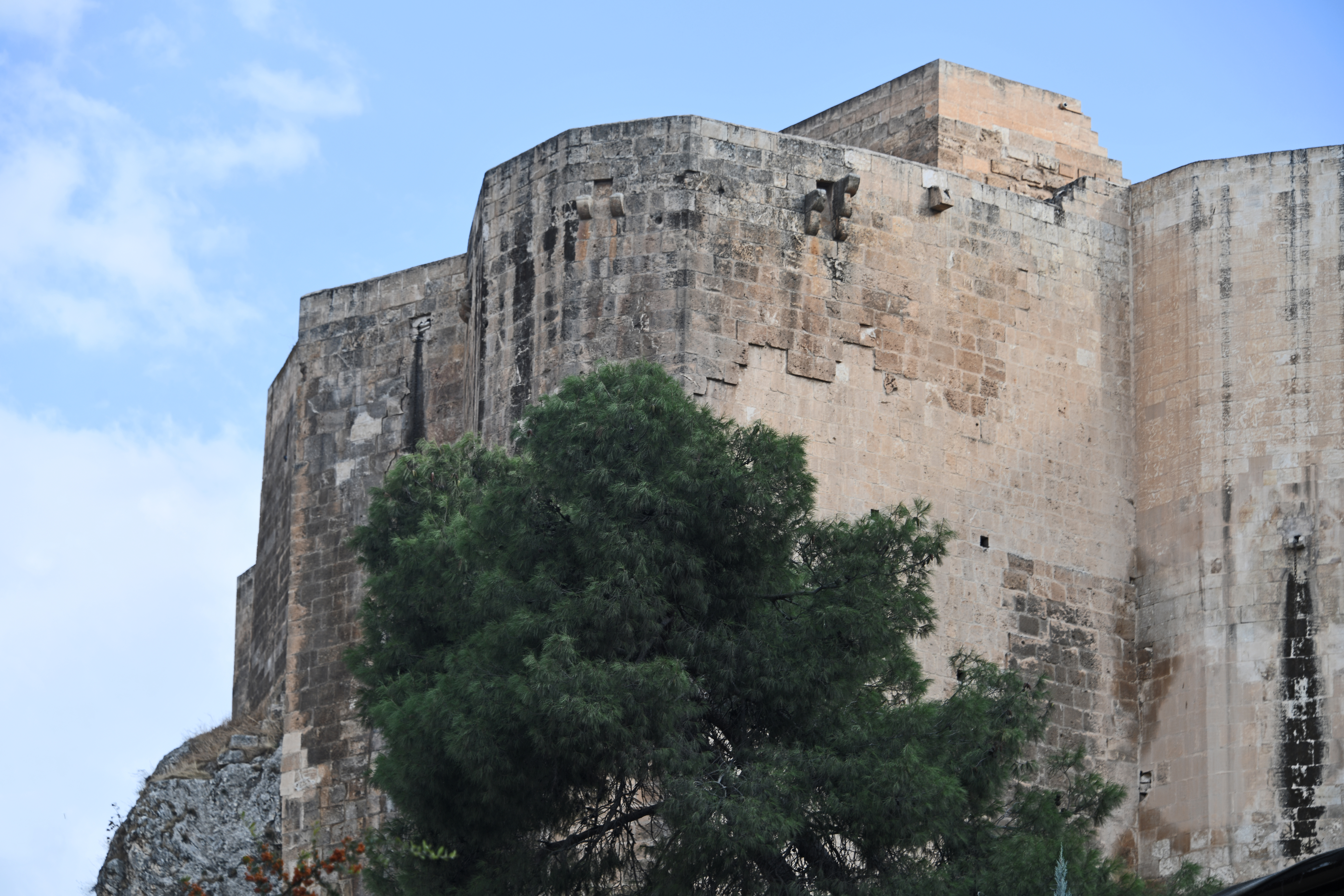
The Castle of Edessa (Urfa) in the eastern half of the county

In 1143, Zengi renewed his war against Joscelin, capturing a number of minor castles in Edessa. Joscelin made an alliance with Kara Arslan, signalling an intention to form a coalition against Zengi. This caused Zengi to overrun most of Kara Arslan's lands and attempt to cut communications between the allies. In 1144, Edessene forces went on a raid towards Balis and Raqqa on the Euphrates. After being promised a fortress north of Gargar, Joscelin marched to aid Kara Arslan with most of his army, and Zengi struck at Edessa. When they arrived on 28 November, the city's defences were already manned. Upon learning of Zengi's movements, Joscelin went to Turbessel with his army, as his force was too small to defeat Zengi and there he could cut off Muslim reinforcements from Aleppo. Joscelin sought aid from the other crusader rulers, and Queen Melisende of Jerusalem sent a detachment of troops.

Before reinforcements could arrive, Zengi broke into Edessa on 24 December, and broke into the citadel on 26 December. He slaughtered all of the Franks, but spared local Christians. After capturing Edessa, Zengi seized Saruj and advanced towards Birejik in 1145. Joscelin was nearby and the queen's army was quickly advancing to reinforce the garrison, motivating the Franks at Birejik to hold out. Zengi raised the siege on 2 May and returned to Mosul. Considering the defence of Birejik untenable, Joscelin surrendered it to the Muslim ruler of Mardin, an enemy of Zengi. Joscelin was left with the half of the county west of the Euphrates. Zengi crushed an Armenian plot to return Edessa to Joscelin in May of 1146, executing the ringleaders. Zengi was murdered by one of his slaves on 14 September 1146.

Joscelin responded to the assassination by launching a second attempt to reclaim Edessa alongside Baldwin of Marash. Joscelin broke into the city on 27 October, taking advantage of the cooperation of the Edessene citizens. However, he was unable to take the citadel due to a lack of siege equipment, and when Zengi's son Nur ad-Din arrived, Joscelin was forced to launch a breakout. Joscelin managed to slip out and make his way towards the Euphrates with a number of native Christians, but a battle was fought on 3 November.

The Franks initially held their own in a fighting march formation, but Joscelin launched an ill-fated cavalry charge which was avoided by the Zengids, causing his force to be routed. Baldwin of Marash was killed in the fighting, Joscelin was wounded in the arm by an arrow, and the native Christians were massacred. In Edessa, the populace was driven into exile, leaving the city desolate. This second siege was significantly more damaging than the first, and was the fatal blow to the county. In November or December of 1146, Joscelin successfully defended Azaz against eight days of Zengid assault. Nur ad-Din seized two more fortresses in Edessa before leaving.

=== Collapse ===
His difficulties prevented him from joining the Second Crusade, which shifted its focus to Damascus. The gap between Syrian and Latin Christians in the county grew under internal divisions and the actions of neighboring Muslim rulers. The count agreed to a temporary peace with Nur ad-Din in 1148, which prevented him from assisting the Principality of Antioch. This protected Nur ad-Din's flank and allowed him to invade Antioch; in the campaign, Raymond of Poitiers and Joscelin's son-in-law Reginald of Marash were killed facing Nur ad-Din at the Battle of Inab on 29 June 1149, leaving Joscelin almost surrounded. Probably in response to Reginald's death, Joscelin campaigned against Antioch's northern border and seied several towns, including Kesoun.

Mesud I, the Seljuk sultan of Rum, invaded the Principality of Antioch before besieging Joscelin at Turbessel. Baldwin III of Jerusalem sent sixty knights to prevent the fall of Azaz. The possibility that the force would go to Turbessel helped convince Mesud to raise the siege, although Joscelin had to give up his hostages. Kara Arslan turned on Joscelin and invaded Edessa, seizing Gargar and the surrounding area, while a joint Frankish-Armenian attempt to turn him back failed. Joscelin managed to defeat Nur ad-Din in a skirmish in early 1150. Patriarch Aimery summoned Joscelin in the spring of 1150 to take up the regency, but Nur ad-Din's forces took the traveling count prisoner.

When his identity became known, Joscelin was taken to Nur ad-Din who had him blinded and imprisoned. Immediately after his imprisonment the county was invaded on all sides and mostly absorbed by Mesud, Timurtash of Mardin, and Nur ad-Din, while Turbessel was sold to Byzantine emperor Manuel I Komnenos. Although the defence of Joscelin's son, Joscelin III, prevented Mesud from capturing Turbessel, it fell to Nur ad-Din's captain Hassan in 1151. Joscelin spent the remaining nine years of his life after 1150 in captivity. His captors used threats and discipline alongside flattery to procure his conversion, but Joscelin remained a Christian until his death in May 1159. He was denied a Latin or Armenian chaplain, forcing him to receive his last sacraments from Ignace, the Jacobite Metropolitan of Aleppo.

== Reputation ==
The expansion of the County of Edessa from 1098 to 1131, before Joscelin's reign

William of Tyre, one of the main sources of the 12th-century, despised Joscelin, and contrasted his behavior with his predecessors, Baldwin II and Joscelin I. In his thirteenth book, William provides a character portrait of Joscelin:

The mother of Joscelin the Younger was a sister of Leo the Armenian, a very influential man among his own people. Though small of stature, Joscelin was stout of limb and very robust. His skin and hair were dark, his face broad and covered with scars from the disease called smallpox. He had bulging eyes and a prominent nose. Although of a generous disposition and distinguished for military prowess, he was yet given to excessive revelry and drunkenness. He was devoted to licentiousness and uncleanness of the flesh to the point of infamous notoriety.

According to William, Joscelin lived in Turbessel due to a lack of responsibility for Edessa and a preference for pleasure. Tyre commented that "through his lack of energy and in punishment for his sins, this Joscelin lost the entire land over which his father ruled so ably." In retelling Joscelin's final fate, he elaborated on his character. According to William, Joscelin was lazy and idle, who was "given over to low and dissolute pleasures, one who spurned good ways and followed base pursuits." William remarked that, in his rivalry with Raymond of Poitiers, Joscelin "paid but slight attention to the truth of the saying, 'When your neighbor’s house is burning, your own property is in danger.'" Armenian sources were no less forgiving. According to Michael the Syrian, he was a tyrant who joined a cult of demons. Steven Runciman gives a fairly similar character portrait, but did not mention Joscelin's distinction for military prowess:

Joscelin II of Edessa lacked his father's energy and political sense. He was an unattractive figure. He was short and thick-set, dark-haired and dark-skinned; his face was pock-marked, with a huge nose and prominent eyes. He was capable of generous gestures, but was lazy, luxurious and lascivious, and quite unfitted to command the chief outpost of Frankish Christendom.

20th-century historians generally followed this line of thinking, with some nuances. Robert Lawrence Nicholson's monograph on Joscelin III accused Joscelin II of being shortsighted, isolationist, drunken, slothful, "blind to vital matters of security", preferring the pleasure of Turbessel over defending Edessa, altogether painting a negative picture. Nicholson did comment on Joscelin II's effort to stay "loyal to his Christian faith" despite "punishments, threats, and blandishments designed to make him a convert to Islam until his death in May, 1159." Other historians like Joshua Prawer and Hans Eberhard Mayer stated that Joscelin had a "feable personality" but emphasised the structural weakness of the county over his personal faults.

More recently, William's conclusions, including those relating to Joscelin, have come under greater scrutiny. Malcolm Barber points out that while William claims that Joscelin was permanently residing at Turbessel, the Muslim historians Ibn al-Qalanisi and Ibn al-Athir believed that his residence there was temporary. Barber suggests that William's intense dislike of Joscelin III, his political rival, may have colored his portrayal of Joscelin II. In his military history of the Crusader states, Nicholas Morton believes that, not yet having lost significant territory, the county was "by no means in decline" before the fall of Edessa and could still maintain long-range offensive capacity, and that the coalition with Kara Arslan was genuinely threatening to Zengi.

== Family ==
Joscelin married Beatrice of Saone, the widow of the wealthy Antiochene baron, William of Zardana. They had:

- Agnes of Courtenay, their first child, probably born around 1133. She first married Reginald of Marash, but he died in battle in 1149. She then married Amalric, her third cousin and later king of Jerusalem, in 1157. After her divorce from Amalric, she held the lands and incomes of the County of Jaffa. Agnes and Amalric's children, Joscelin's grandchildren, were King Baldwin IV and Queen Sibylla of Jerusalem, and Agnes' grandson was King Baldwin V.
- Joscelin III, the second child. Old enough to sign charters in 1141, he was probably born near the middle of the 1130s, possibly around 1134. He held the nominal title Count of Edessa, being in reality a respected Jerusalemite baron.
- Isabella of Courtenay, possibly married Prince Thoros II of Armenia and had two daughters.

Joscelin's close family and relationship with Frankish leaders

Guy I of Montlhéry	Hodierna of Gometz
Hugh I of Rethel	Melisende of Montlhéry	Isabella of Montlhéry	Joscelin of Courtenay
Morphia of Melitene	Baldwin II of Jerusalem	Leo I of Armenia	Beatrice of Armenia	Joscelin I of Edessa	Maria of Salerno
Fulk V of Anjou	Melisende of Jerusalem	Alice of Jerusalem	Hodierna of Jerusalem	Raymond II of Tripoli	Ioveta of Jerusalem	Beatrice of Saone	Joscelin II of Edessa	Stephanie of Courtenay
Baldwin III of Jerusalem	Amalric of Jerusalem	Constance of Antioch	Raymond of Poitiers	Agnes of Courtenay	Joscelin of Courtenay	Isabella of Courtenay

== Sources ==
- Baldwin, Marshall W. (1969). "The Latin States under Baldwin III and Amalric I". In Setton, Kenneth M. (ed.). A History of the Crusades. Vol. I. University of Wisconsin Press.
- Babcock, Emily Atwater, ed. (1976). A History of Deeds Done Beyond the Sea. Octagon Books. ISBN 0374903204.
- Barber, Malcolm (2012). The Crusader States. Yale University Press. ISBN 978-0-300-18931-5.
- Fink, Harold S. (1969). "The Foundation of the Latin States, 1099–1118". In Setton, Kenneth M. (ed.). A History of the Crusades. Vol. 1. University of Wisconsin Press.
- Gibb, H.A.R. (1969a). "Zengi and the Fall of Edessa". In Setton, Kenneth M. (ed.). A History of the Crusades. Vol. I. University of Wisconsin Press.
- Gibb, H.A.R. (1969b). "The Career of Nur ad-Din". In Setton, Kenneth M. (ed.). A History of the Crusades. Vol. I. University of Wisconsin Press.
- Lilie, Ralph-Johannes (1993). Byzantium and the Crusader States 1096-1204. Oxford University Press. ISBN 0-19-820407-8.
- Lock, Peter (2006). The Routledge Companion to the Crusades. Routledge. ISBN 9-78-0-415-39312-6.
- MacEvitt, Christopher (2010). The Crusades and the Christian World of the East: Rough Tolerance. University of Pennsylvania Press.
- Mayer, Hans Eberhard (1988). The Crusades. London: Oxford University Press. ISBN 978-0-19-873015-6.
- Morton, Nicholas (2020). The Crusader States & their Neighbours: A Military History, 1099–1187. Oxford University Press. ISBN 978-0-19-882454-1.
- Nicholson, Robert Lawrence (1954). Joscelyn I, Prince of Edessa. University of Illinois Press.
- Nicholson, Robert L. (1969). "The Growth of the Latin States, 1118-1144". In Setton, Kenneth M. (ed.). A History of the Crusades. Vol. I. University of Wisconsin Press.
- Nicholson, Robert L. (1973). Joscelyn III and the Fall of the Crusader States, 1134-1199. E.J. Brill. ISBN 978-90-04-03676-5.
- Phillips, Jonathan P. (2008). The Second Crusade: extending the frontiers of Christendom. Yale University: Yale University Press.
- Rudt de Collenberg, W. H. (1968). "L'empereur Isaac de Chypre et sa fille (1155–1207)". Byzantion. 38 (1): 123–179.
- Runciman, Steven (1989). A History of the Crusades, Volume II: The Kingdom of Jerusalem and the Frankish East, 1100-1187. Cambridge University Press. ISBN 0-521-06163-6.
- Weltecke, Dorothea (2003). "Contacts between Syriac Orthodox and Latin Military Orders". In Ciggaar, Krijnie Nelly; Teule, Herman (eds.). East and West in the Crusader States: Context, Contacts, Confrontations. ISBN 9042912871.

Preceded by Joscelin I	Count of Edessa; 1131–1150/1159	Succeeded by Joscelin III (titular count)
