= Siege of Edessa (1144) =

12th-century conflict in West Asia

Coordinates: 37.1500°N 38.8000°E

- Part of the Crusades
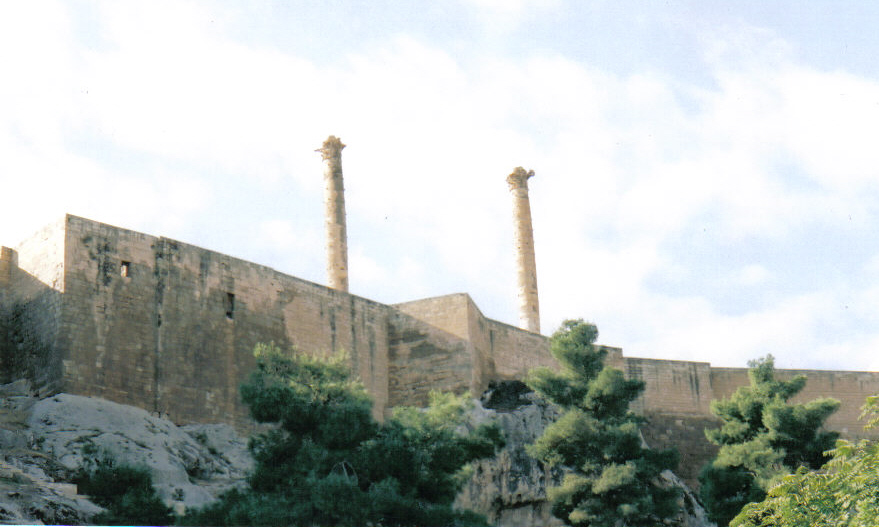
- Urfa Castle
Date	28 November – 24 December 1144
Location	Edessa, County of Edessa (present-day Sanliurfa, Turkey)
Result	Zengid victory
Territorial changes	Start of the Second Crusade

Belligerents
County of Edessa	Zengids

Commanders and leaders
Archbishop Hugh †; Bishop Basil bar Shumna; Bishop John	Imad al-Din Zengi

Casualties and losses
5,000–6,000 civilians killed	Unknown

The siege of Edessa took place from 28 November to 24 December 1144, resulting in the fall of the capital of the County of Edessa to Imad al-Din Zengi, the atabeg of Mosul and Aleppo. This event was the catalyst for the Second Crusade.

== Background ==
The County of Edessa was the first of the Crusader states to be established during the First Crusade. It dates from 1098 when Baldwin of Boulogne left the main army of the First Crusade and founded a principality.

Edessa was the most northerly, the weakest, and the least populated of the Crusader states. As such, it was subject to frequent attacks from the surrounding Muslim states ruled by the Artuqids, Danishmends, and Seljuk Turks. Count Baldwin II and Joscelin of Courtenay were taken captive after their defeat at the Battle of Harran in 1104. Joscelin was captured a second time in 1122, and although Edessa recovered somewhat after the Battle of Azaz in 1125, Joscelin was killed in battle in 1131. His successor Joscelin II was forced into an alliance with the Byzantine Empire, but in 1143 both Byzantine Emperor John II Comnenus and King Fulk of Jerusalem died. John II was succeeded by his son Manuel I Comnenus, who had to deal with consolidating power at home against his elder brothers, while Fulk was succeeded by his wife Melisende and his son Baldwin III. Joscelin II had also quarreled with Raymond II of Tripoli and Raymond of Poitiers, leaving Edessa with no powerful allies.

== Siege ==
In 1144 Joscelin was able to make an alliance with Kara Arslan, the Artuqid ruler of Diyarbakır, against the growing power and influence of Zengi. Joscelin marched out of Edessa with almost his entire army to support Kara Aslan against Aleppo. Zengi, already seeking to take advantage of Fulk's death in 1143, hurried north to besiege Edessa, arriving on November 28. The city had been warned of his arrival and was prepared for a siege, but there was little they could do while Joscelin and the army were elsewhere.

The defense of the city was led by the Latin Archbishop, Hugh of Edessa, the Armenian Bishop John, and the Jacobite Bishop Basil bar Shumna. John and Basil ensured that no native Christians would desert to Zengi. When Joscelin heard of the siege, he took the army to Turbessel, knowing that he could not dislodge Zengi without help from the other Crusader states. In Jerusalem, Queen Melisende responded to Joscelin's appeal by sending an army led by Manasses of Hierges, Philip of Milly, and Elinand of Bures. Raymond of Poitiers ignored the call for help, as his army was already occupied against the Byzantine Empire in Cilicia.

Zengi surrounded the entire city, realizing that no army was defending it. He built siege engines and began to mine the walls, while his forces were joined by Kurdish and Turcoman reinforcements. The inhabitants of Edessa resisted as much as they could but had no experience in siege warfare; the city's numerous towers remained undefended. They also did not know of counter-mining, and part of the wall near the Gate of the Hours collapsed on 24 December. Zengi's troops rushed into the city, killing all those who were unable to flee to the citadel. Thousands more were suffocated or trampled to death in the panic, including Archbishop Hugh. Zengi ordered his men to stop the massacre, although all the Latin prisoners that he had taken were executed; the native Christians were allowed to live freely. The citadel was handed over on 26 December. One of Zengi's commanders, Zayn ad-Din Ali Kutchuk, was appointed governor, while Bishop Basil, apparently willing to give his loyalty to whoever ruled the city, was recognized as leader of the Christian population.

== Aftermath ==
In January 1145, Zengi captured Saruj and besieged Birejik, but the army of Jerusalem had finally arrived and joined with Joscelin. Zengi also heard of trouble in Mosul and rushed back to take control. The Islamic world praised him as a "defender of the faith" and al-Malik al-Mansur, the victorious king. Ibn al-Qaysarani praised his victory in a rhyming panegyric. He did not pursue an attack on the remaining territory of Edessa or the Principality of Antioch, as was feared. Joscelin continued to rule the remnants of the county to the west of the Euphrates from Turbessel, but little by little, the rest of the territory was captured by the Muslims or sold to the Byzantines.

Zengi was assassinated by a slave in 1146 while besieging Qalat Jabar and was succeeded in Aleppo by his son Nur ad-Din. Joscelin attempted to take back Edessa following Zengi's murder and recaptured all but the citadel in October 1146. However, he had no help from the other Crusader states, and his poorly planned expedition was driven out of Edessa by Nur ad-Din in November. Joscelin, fearing for the safety of the city's Christian Armenians, attempted to break a hole in Nur ad-Din's forces through which the natives could flee to safety. However, Joscelin's attempt failed, and his fears came true when Nur al-Din's troops massacred the fleeing Armenians and forced the survivors into slavery. In 1145 Nerses IV the Gracious (1102-1173) wrote the elegy Voghb Yedesio (Lamentation on Edessa) on the fall of Edessa.

By this time, news of the fall of Edessa reached Europe, and Raymond of Poitiers had already sent a delegation including Hugh, Bishop of Jabala, to seek aid from Pope Eugene III. On 1 December 1145 Eugene issued the papal bull Quantum praedecessores calling for the Second Crusade. This crusade was led by Louis VII of France and Conrad III of Germany, but by 1148, it had ended in disaster, and Edessa was never recovered.

== Bibliography ==
=== Primary sources ===
- The Damascus Chronicle of the Crusaders, extracted and translated from the Chronicle of Ibn al-Qalanisi. Edited and translated by H. A. R. Gibb. London, 1932.
- William of Tyre. A History of Deeds Done Beyond the Sea. Edited and translated by E. A. Babcock and A. C. Krey. Columbia University Press, 1943.
- Armenia and the Crusades, Tenth to Twelfth Centuries: The Chronicle of Matthew of Edessa. Translated by Ara Edmond Dostourian. National Association for Armenian Studies and Research, 1993.

=== Secondary sources ===
- Ferdinandi, Sergio (2017). La Contea Franca di Edessa. Fondazione e Profilo Storico del Primo Principato Crociato nel Levante (1098-1150). Pontificia Università Antonianum - Rome. ISBN 978-88-7257-103-3.
- Hermes, Nizar F. (2017). "The Poet(ry) of Frankish Enchantment: The Ifranjiyyāt of Ibn Qaysarānī". Middle Eastern Literatures. 20 (3): 267–287. doi:10.1080/1475262x.2017.1385695. S2CID 166119010.
- Runciman, Steven (1952). A History of the Crusades, Volume II: The Kingdom of Jerusalem and the Frankish East. Vol. 2. Cambridge: Cambridge University Press.
- Setton, Kenneth M.; Baldwin, Marshall W., eds. (1969) [1955]. A History of the Crusades, Volume I: The First Hundred Years. Vol. 1 (Second ed.). Madison, Milwaukee, and London: University of Wisconsin Press. ISBN 0-299-04834-9.
