= Geoffrey the Monk =

Geoffrey the Monk was the count of Marash in the Principality of Antioch (now Kahramanmaraş, Turkey) from around 1114 to 1124.

The first reference to Geoffrey was connected to his participation in the Battle of the "Field of Blood". In this battle, Ilghazi, the Artuqid ruler of Mardin almost annihilated the army of Roger of Salerno, the ruler of Antioch on 28 June, 1119. According to the 12th-century historian William of Tyre, Geoffrey and Guy Fresnel jointly commanded a battle-line. Geoffrey managed to escape from the battlefield after Ilghazi's victory. William of Tyre described Geoffrey as a "magnate of the region", without specifying his title.

== Sources ==
- Asbridge, Thomas (2000). The Creation of the Principality of Antioch, 1098–1130. The Boydell Press. ISBN 978-0-85115-661-3.
- Beech, George T. (1996). "The Crusader Lordship of Marash in Armenian Cilicia, 1104–1149". Viator. 27: 35–52. doi:10.1484/j.viator.2.301121.
- Buck, Andrew D. (2017). The Principality of Antioch and its Frontiers in the Twelfth Century. The Boydell Press. ISBN 978-1-78327-173-3.
