= Battle of Inab =

1149 battle during the Second Crusade in modern-day Syria

- Part of the Crusades
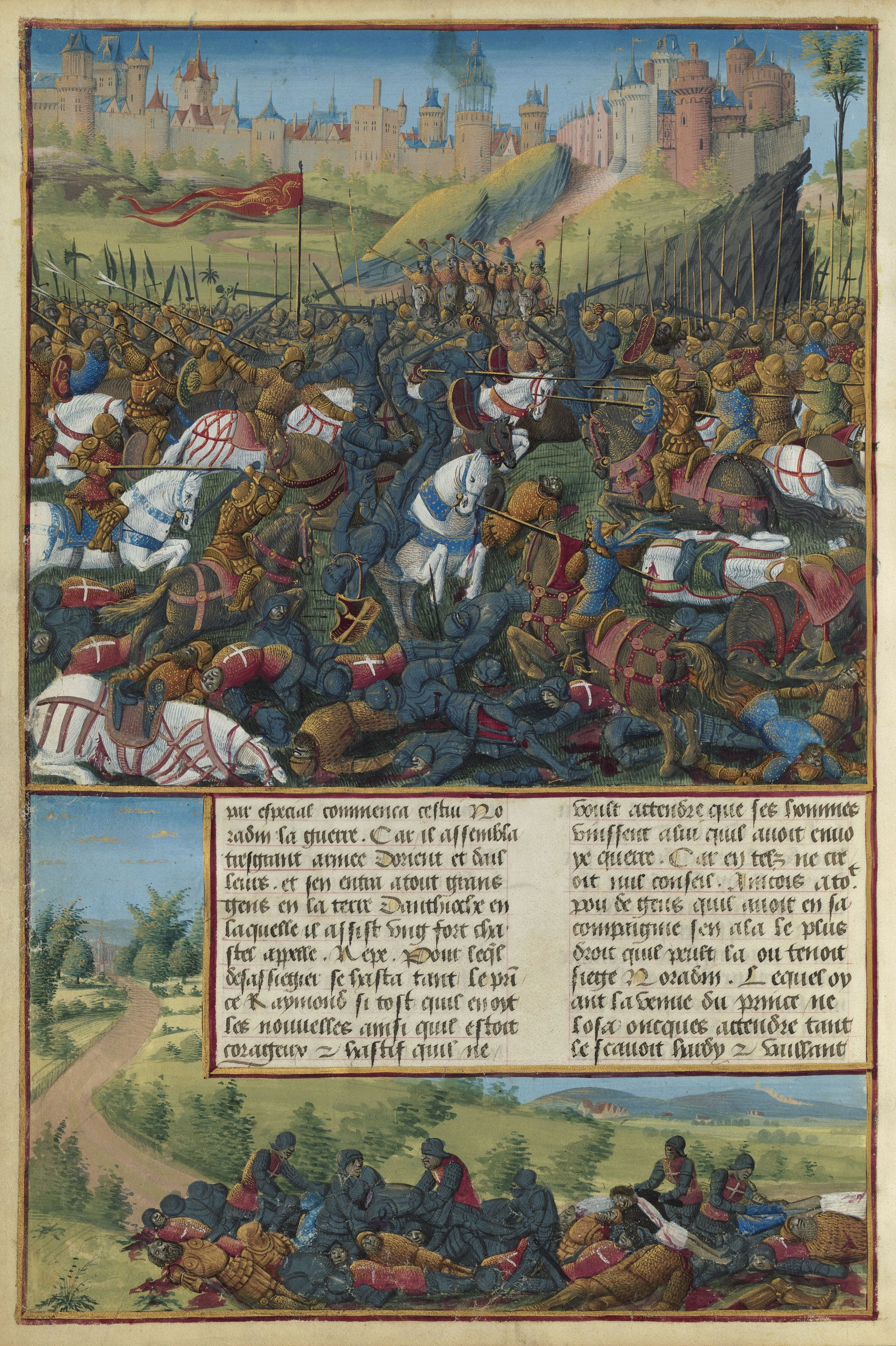
- The battle of Inab (from the Passages d'outremer), with the post-battle recovery of Raymond of Poitiers' body seen below.
Date	29 June 1149
Location	Inab, Seljuk Sultanate (modern Syria) 36°31′05″N 36°57′13″E
Result	Zengid-Burid victory

Belligerents
Principality of Antioch; Assassins	Zengids; Burids

Commanders and leaders
Raymond of Poitiers †; Ali ibn Wafa' †	Nur al-Din Zengi; Najm al-Din Ayyub; Unur of Damascus

Strength
4,000 cavalry and 1,000 infantry Or 1,400	6,000

Casualties and losses
Heavy	Unknown
- Location within Syria

The Battle of Inab, also called Battle of Ard al-Hâtim or Fons Muratus, was fought on 29 June 1149, during the Second Crusade. The Zengid army of the atabeg Nur al-Din Zengi destroyed the combined army of Prince Raymond of Antioch and the Assassins of Ali ibn-Wafa. The prince was killed, and the Principality of Antioch was subsequently pillaged and reduced in size as its eastern border was pushed west.

== Background ==
After the death of Nur ad-Din's father Zengi in 1146, Prince Raymond of Antioch invaded the vulnerable province of Aleppo (part of the Seljuk Empire), which was threatened by hostile powers on all sides. After establishing his own authority in Aleppo and successfully defending Edessa in 1147, Nur ad-Din invaded Antioch in late 1148 and besieged Afamiya. Raymond beat him off and captured his baggage train. When he returned a few months later to attack Yaghra, Raymond, at the head of a small force, forced him to retire to Aleppo.

In June 1149, Nur ad-Din invaded Antioch and besieged the fortress of Inab, with aid from Unur of Damascus and a force of Turcomans. Nur ad-Din had about 6,000 troops, mostly cavalry, at his disposal. Raymond and his Christian neighbor, Count Joscelin II of Edessa, had been enemies since Raymond had refused to send an army to relieve besieged Edessa in 1146. Joscelin even made a treaty of alliance with Nur ad-Din against Raymond. For their part, Count Raymond II of Tripoli and Queen Melisende of Jerusalem refused to aid the prince of Antioch. Feeling confident because he had twice defeated Nur ad-Din previously, Prince Raymond struck out on his own with an army of 400 knights and 1,000 foot soldiers.

== Battle ==
Prince Raymond allied himself with Ali ibn-Wafa, a leader of the Assassins and an enemy of Nur ad-Din. Before he had collected all his available forces, Raymond and his ally mounted a relief expedition. Amazed at the weakness of Prince Raymond's army, Nur ad-Din at first suspected that it was only an advance guard and that the main Frankish army must be lurking nearby. Upon the approach of the combined force, Nur ad-Din raised the siege of Inab and withdrew. Rather than staying close to the stronghold, Raymond and ibn-Wafa camped with their forces in open country. After Nur ad-Din's scouts noted that the allies camped in an exposed location and did not receive reinforcements, the atabeg swiftly surrounded the enemy camp during the night.

On 29 June, Nur ad-Din attacked and destroyed the army of Antioch. Presented with an opportunity to escape, the Prince of Antioch refused to abandon his soldiers. Raymond was a man of "immense stature" and fought back, "cutting down all who came near him". Nevertheless, both Raymond and ibn-Wafa were killed, along with Reynald of Marash. A few Franks escaped the disaster. Much of the territory of Antioch was now open to Nur ad-Din, the most important of which was a route to the Mediterranean. Nur ad-Din rode out to the coast and bathed in the sea as a symbol of his conquest.

The contemporary historian William of Tyre blamed the Antiochenes' defeat on Raymond's rashness. One modern historian says the Crusader defeat at Inab was "as disastrous at that of the Ager Sanguinis" a generation earlier. Yet another remarks that it "was not part of a watershed moment, and should not be seen in the context of the Second Crusade".

== Aftermath ==
After his victory, Nur ad-Din went on to capture the fortresses of Artah, Harim, and ‘Imm, which defended the approach to Antioch itself. Harim was not recovered until 1157, then lost permanently in 1164. He sent the main party of his army to besiege Afamiya. After plundering the region, he besieged Antioch, which was virtually defenceless because of the loss of its prince and its army. The city was divided between a surrender party and a resistance party. The former, led by Raymond's widow, Constance, and the Patriarch, Aimery of Limoges, prevailed, and Nur ad-Din was bought off, with some of the treasure coming from the Patriarch's own possessions. A small force was left behind to prevent reinforcements from entering the city, while Nur ad-Din went down to the sea to bathe in it as a sign of victory. He plundered the lands around Saint Simeon's Monastery and then rejoined his forces to capture Afamiya.

Upon receiving news that King Baldwin III of Jerusalem was marching north with some Templars to relieve the siege, Nur ad-Din opened negotiations. The border between Antioch and Aleppo was re-drawn to Nur ad-Din's gain and the armies went home. Joscelin now found that his enemy Raymond's defeat and death placed his own possessions in extreme peril. Joscelin would soon be captured by Nur ad-Din (1150) and what remained of his County of Edessa was evacuated by its Latin inhabitants.

After the victory at Inab, Nur ad-Din became a hero throughout the Islamic world. His goal became the destruction of the Crusader states, and the strengthening of Islam through jihad; he had already set up religious schools and new mosques in Aleppo, and expelled those he considered heretics from his territory, especially Shiites. Jihad was influenced by the presence of the Christian Crusader states as it could be used as an excuse for maintenance of a permanent state of war. Nur ad-Din went on to capture the remnants of the County of Edessa, and brought Damascus under his rule in 1154, further weakening the Crusader states.
