= Red Monastery of Kaysun =

Monastery in present-day Çakırhüyük, Turkey

The Red Monastery of Kaysun (arm. Karmir Vank), also Monastery of Julian, was a Syriac Orthodox and later Armenian monastery in Kaysun (modern Çakırhüyük, Turkey).

== History ==
=== Syriac period ===
The Red Monastery (Dairā Sumaqtā) was first mentioned as a Syriac Orthodox monastery between 1014 and 1028. Several Syriac bishops such as Theodosios, metropolit of Damascus, or Yohannan, bishop of Kaysun, came from the monastery.

=== Armenian period ===
At the end of the eleventh century, the region had come under control of the Armenian Kogh Vasil, whose wife, together with a vassal of Kogh, Kurtig, seems to have evicted the Syriac monks and granted it to Armenian monks. The monastery later also became the burial place of Kogh Vasil and became associated with the dynastic identity of the ruling house.

The monastery became with Ark'akaghin, Drazark and Skevra a famous center of manrousoumn, the study of church songs, melodies and khaz notation. Both the later Catholicoi Grigor III Pahlavuni and Nerses IV Snorhali were educated at the monastery by the abbot Step'anos Manuk (Stephen the Boy). Among its other graduates, who were generally given the designation of "snorhali", was also Sargis Snorhali, who was known, like Nerses, for his commentaries on the Gospels and Catholic epistles. Grigor, who had become catholicos in 1113, ruled from the monastery until 1116 when Kaysun came under Frankish control. It is possible that the monastery is to be equated with the monastery of Šulr.

The monastery was burned down by the Danishmendid ruler Melik Mehmed Gazi in 1136.

== Bibliography ==
- Beihammer, Alexander Daniel (2017). Byzantium and the Emergence of Muslim Turkish Anatolia, ca. 1040-1130. Routledge. ISBN 978-1-138-22959-4.
- Weitenberg, Jos (2006). "The Armenian monasteries in the Black Mountain". In Ciggaar, Krijna Nelly; Metcalf, David Michael (eds.). East and West in the Medieval Eastern Mediterranean: Antioch from the Byzantine Reconquest Until the End of the Crusader Principality. Peeters Publishers. ISBN 978-90-429-1735-4.
- Vest, Bernd Andreas (2007). Geschichte der Stadt Melitene und der umliegenden Gebiete: vom Vorabend der arabischen bis zum Abschluss der türkischen Eroberung (um 600-1124) (in German). Dr. Kovač. ISBN 978-3-8300-2575-7.
