= Siege of Edessa (1146) =

Crusaders siege on Zengid Edessa

Coordinates: 37°09′N 38°48′E

- Part of the Crusades
- Battle of Edessa in 1146, illustrated by Jeanne Montbaston (1337), Bibliothèque Nationale de France
Date	October – November 1146
Location	Edessa (modern-day Şanlıurfa, Turkey)
Result	Zengid victory

Belligerents
County of Edessa	Zengids

Commanders and leaders
Joscelyn II of Edessa; Baldwin of Marash †	Nūr al-Dīn

Strength
?	10,000

Casualties and losses
Thousands killed Thousands enslaved	?

The siege of Edessa in October–November 1146 marked the permanent end of the rule of the Frankish Counts of Edessa in the city on the eve of the Second Crusade. It was the second siege the city had suffered in as many years, the first siege of Edessa having ended in December 1144. In 1146, Joscelyn II of Edessa and Baldwin of Marash recaptured the city by stealth but could not take or even properly besiege the citadel. After a brief counter-siege, Zangid governor Nūr al-Dīn took the city. The population was massacred and the walls razed. This victory was pivotal in the rise of Nūr al-Dīn and the decline of the Christian city of Edessa.

== Sources ==
The second battle for Edessa is covered in many sources. From a Frankish perspective, there is William II of Tyre; from the Syriac perspective, Michael the Syrian, Bar Hebraeus and the anonymous Chronicle of 1234; for the Muslims, Ibn al-Ḳalānisī of Damascus, Ḳamāl al-Dīn Ibn al-ʿAdīm of Aleppo, Ibn al-Athīr, Abū Shāma and the anonymous Būstān al-jāmiʿ; and for the Armenians, Gregory the Priest's continuation of Matthew of Edessa's Chronicle.

The Syriac Basil the Doctor wrote an elegy on the death of Baldwin of Marash.

== Joscelyn captures the city ==
On the death of Edessa's first conqueror, ʿImād al-Dīn Zangī, in September 1146, the Armenian community in the city began plotting with Count Joscelyn II how he might retake the city. An earlier Armenian plot to retake the city had been suppressed in May by the Turks, who then settled 300 Jewish families in the city. He and his vassal Baldwin of Marash set out from Dülük with an army of cavalry and infantry in late October. They arrived before the city on 27 October. They entered the city by night with the help of the citizenry, who let down ropes and ladders from the walls, and the incompetence of the Turkish garrison.

Joscelyn quickly took control of the city, but the garrison retreated to the citadel. Lacking siege machinery and the materials with which to construct it, the citadel could not be properly invested. Joscelyn sent out appeals for aid to the other Crusader states. According to the Chronicle of 1234, Prince Raymond I of Antioch refused to help Joscelyn and Baldwin because "he was enraged with both of them for not acknowledging him as their overlord." Historian Steven Runciman gives a more sympathetic reason for Raymond's refusal: "the expedition was ill-planned". During their brief second period of control of the city, which lasted a mere six days, the Franks engaged in looting of shops and houses, both of Muslims and Christians. The Muslim population either fled to Ḥarrān or took refuge in the citadel with the Turkish garrison.

== Nūr al-Dīn's siege ==
Nūr al-Dīn, who had inherited Aleppo on Zangī's death, ceased his war with Raymond of Antioch ordered a levée en masse throughout his domains as soon as he learned of the fall of Edessa. He also appealed to the neighbouring Seljuk governors for aid. He marched from Aleppo to Edessa with an army of 10,000. He arrived on 2 November and set about besieging the city with trebuchets. Through a spy, Joscelyn had advanced knowledge of his arrival. When Joscelyn realized that he was trapped between the besiegers and the garrison in the citadel, he chose to abandon the city. The Syriac sources claim that this decision was made without consulting the citizenry, but that after it was made the military leaders forced the citizens to leave during the night. This account has been questioned. Since the citizens are otherwise portrayed as collaborators, it would hardly have made sense for them to stay. It is possible, however, that the Syriac citizens had stood aloof while the Armenians collaborated.

The retreat was a disaster. The Christians were caught in the gate and massacred. Joscelyn and a band of twenty knights escaped to the Water Tower, but were unable to defend it and fled in secret. The Christian survivors made their way to the Euphrates river, a distance of fourteen miles. Baldwin was in the van and Joscelyn in the rear. The following day (3 November), although the rearguard was holding its own, Joscelyn ordered a counterattack on the pursuing forces. He led the attack from the west while Baldwin counterattacked from the east. Both were routed. Baldwin was killed. Joscelyn was wounded in the side by an arrow, but escaped to Samosata. There he was joined by the Syriac bishop, Basil bar Shumna. By December, Nūr al-Dīn was in control of the city. He had the walls razed.

The men of Edessa were massacred, the women and children enslaved. Michael the Syrian estimates the total number of dead from both sieges of Edessa at 30,000 with a further 16,000 enslaved. He estimates that only about 1,000 Edessene men escaped to freedom and no women or children. At the end of 1146, the city was empty save for the corpses. The Armenian bishop John was captured and taken to Aleppo. It was "far worse than the first [siege] and the city never recovered its former prominence". It was also the "fatal blow to the county" of Edessa.

During and following the sack of the city many churches were also destroyed. According to Michael the Syrian, those included: the Church of Saint John the Baptist, the Great Church, the Church of the Holy Apostles, the Church of Saint Thomas, the Church of Saint Michael, the Church of Saint Cosmas (which contained the Mandylion of Edessa), the Church of Saint George, the Church of the Saviour, three churches dedicated to the Mother of God, two churches of the Forty Martyrs, the Church of the Confessors, the Church of Saint Stephan and the Church of Saint Theodore.

== Bibliography ==
- Amouroux-Mourad, Monique (1988). Le comté d'Edesse, 1098–1150. Paul Guethner.
- Baldwin, Marsall W. (1969) [1955]. "The Latin States under Baldwin III and Amalric I, 1143–1174". In Setton, Kenneth M.; Baldwin, Marshall W. (eds.). A History of the Crusades, Volume I: The First Hundred Years. Vol. 1 (Second ed.). Madison, Milwaukee, and London: University of Wisconsin Press. pp. 528–561. ISBN 0-299-04834-9.
- Barber, Malcolm (2012). The Crusader States. Yale University Press.
- Chabot, Jean-Baptiste, ed. (1905). Chronique de Michel le Syrien. Vol. III. Ernest Leroux.
- Chevedden, Paul Edward (1998). "The Hybrid Trebuchet: The Halfway Step to the Counterweight Trebuchet". In Donald J. Kagay; Theresa M. Vann (eds.). On the Social Origins of Medieval Institutions: Essays in Honor of Joseph F. 0'Callaghan. Brill. pp. 179–222.
- MacEvitt, Christopher (2007). The Crusades and the Christian World of the East: Rough Tolerance. University of Pennsylvania Press.
- Nicholson, Robert Lawrence (1973). Joscelyn III and the Fall of the Crusader States, 1134–1199. Leiden: E. J. Brill.
- Runciman, Steven (1952). A History of the Crusades, Volume II: The Kingdom of Jerusalem and the Frankish East. Cambridge: Cambridge University Press.
- Tyerman, Christopher (2006). God's War: A New History of the Crusades. Penguin.
