= Chronicle of Saint-Maixent =

Start of the prologue to the Chronicle in the Paris manuscript

The Chronicle of Saint-Maixent (Note: Latin: Chronicon sancti Maxentii; French: Chronique de Saint-Maixent) is an anonymous Latin universal history written at the Abbey of Saint-Maixent between 1126 and 1141. The first and larger part gives a history of the world down to the reign of Charlemagne (768–814). The second part is focused on France, Poitou and the abbey in particular. The continuous history ends in 1126, but notices for 1134, 1137 and 1140/1141 were added. It is sometimes attributed to Pierre Raymond, abbot from 1134 to 1164. The Chronicle also covers in some detail the Frankish involvement in the Iberian [Reconquista] as well as a number of marriage alliances and political disputes in that region.

The Chronicle, about 400 pages in length, survives in two manuscripts:

- Paris, Bibliothèque nationale de France, lat. 4892 (12th century), folios 1–207 (Note: Online digitization)
- Vatican City, Biblioteca Apostolica Vaticana, reg. lat. 554 (15th century), folios 1–195 (Note: Online digitization)

The Vatican manuscript is a copy of the Parisian.

The Chronicle of Saint-Maixent has sometimes been known erroneously as the Chronicon Malleacense or Chronique de Maillezais after the nearby Abbey of Saint-Pierre de Maillezais.

== Editions ==
- "Chronicon Sancti Maxentii Pictavensis", in Paul Marchegay and Émile Mabille (eds.), Chroniques des églises d'Anjou. Paris: Société de l'histoire de France, 1869, pp. 349–433.
- Jean Verdon, ed. and trans. La chronique de Saint-Maixent (751–1140). Paris: Société d'édition les Belles lettres, 1979.

== Bibliography ==
- Bratu, Christian; Rech, Régis (2010). "Chronicon S. Maxentii". In Graeme Dunphy (ed.). Encyclopedia of the Medieval Chronicle. Vol. 1. Brill. p. 419.
- Lacroix, Benoît (1982). "Review of Jean Verdon, éd. trad., La Chronique de Saint-Maixent (751–1140)". Cahiers de Civilisation Médiévale. 25 (97): 75.
- Painter, Sidney (1957). "The Lords of Lusignan in the Eleventh and Twelfth Centuries". Speculum. 32 (1): 27–47. doi:10.2307/2849244.
- Villegas-Aristizábal, Lucas (2021). "Memoria y fuentes: Memoria y fuentes de la guerra santa peninsular de la guerra santa peninsular (siglos x–xv)". Las guerras peninsulares contra al-Ándalus: una visión desde las fuentes narrativas ultramontanas (c. 1064 – c. 1217). pp. 103–129. ISBN 978-84-18105-48-7.
