= Basil the Doctor =

Armenian priest and poet

Basil the Doctor (Armenian: Barsegh or Barsel) was an Armenian priest and poet. As the chaplain and confessor of Baldwin, Frankish lord of Marash, he wrote a funeral oration on the latter's death at the battle for Edessa in 1146.

Basil's lengthy funeral oration or eulogy provides us with more information about Baldwin than any other lord of Marash. Basil describes Baldwin as fluent in Armenian. He describes his virtues in hyperbolic terms: "a handsome young man, a brave and mighty warrior, an ingenious, wise, and prudent prince whose life was so short, this gallant and charming man." He calls him a captive who cannot be redeemed. He also presents his life as a warning to other Frankish leaders, for Baldwin was "unrepentant, arrogant and wicked". This part of the oration is given in the first person, that is, in Baldwin's voice. He is reproached (or rather reproaches himself) for injustice, luxury, power lust, greed and violence. Despite all the flaws Basil lists—and he refrains from listing specific misdeeds—he declares that "all of [his] sins have been forgiven, and he has been made whole through his ceaseless confession and afterward through the shedding of his blood in the great battle." According to Basil, Baldwin made a final confession before his death, lamenting the death of his parents and his poor relationship with his brother as punishments for his sins.

Basil's oration was incorporated into the chronicle of Gregory the Priest. According to the 13th-century Armenian historian Sempad the Constable, Basil himself distributed copies of his poem to the Franks of northern Syria, especially Antioch. This probably contributed to Baldwin's subsequent fame. Scholars are divided on whether the oration should be seen as expressing strong affinity of the Armenians for the Frankish rule, or as a rebuke of the Franks for oppressing the Armenians. Basil's depiction of Baldwin's death in battle as cleansing him of sin is consistent with the theology of the Crusades and represents western influence. In other areas of theology, it appears that Basil had a strong eastern influence on Baldwin.

== Editions ==
- Basile, docteur en théologie, "Oraison funèbre de Baudouin, comte de Marasch et de K'eçoun", in Recueil des historiens des croisades, Documents arméniens, vol. 1 (Paris, 1869), pp. 204–222.

== Bibliography ==
- Beech, George T. (1996). "The Crusader Lordship of Marash in Armenian Cilicia, 1104–1149". Viator. 27: 35–52. doi:10.1484/j.viator.2.301121.
- MacEvitt, Christopher (2007). The Crusades and the Christian World of the East: Rough Tolerance. University of Pennsylvania Press.
- Runciman, Steven (1952). A History of the Crusades, Volume II: The Kingdom of Jerusalem and the Frankish East. Cambridge: Cambridge University Press.
