= Baldwin of Marash =

Crusader lord (died 1146)

Seal of Baldwin of Marash

Baldwin of Marash (died 1146) was a Crusader baron in northern Syria, the lord of Marash from at least 1136.

== Biography ==
The chronicler Gregory the Priest says that Baldwin was the brother of Prince Raymond of Antioch and therefore the son of Duke William IX of Aquitaine. Baldwin was the chief vassal of Joscelin II, Count of Edessa. He controlled the city of Marash (modern Kahramanmaraş) and the strategic fortress of Kaysun. Baldwin's fiefdom was in the northern border region of the Crusader states where the population was largely Armenian Christians.

In 1135, Leo I, Prince of Armenia seized Sarventikar from Baldwin of Marash. Sarventikar was a fortress on the slopes of the Amanus Mountains. In 1136 Raymond of Antioch attacked Leo I's Armenian Kingdom in Cilicia. Baldwin of Marash marched with the Antiochenes. However Baldwin's overlord, Count Joscelin II of Edessa, Leo's nephew, helped the Armenians defeat the Antiochene army. After the battle, Baldwin convinced Leo to meet him. At the meeting Baldwin seized him and sent him off to Antioch as a prisoner.

That same year the Turkoman Danishmends briefly captured Marash but the city was retaken by Crusader forces the following year.

In October 1146, Baldwin accompanied Joscelin on an expedition attempting to recapture the city of Edessa from the Muslims who had conquered the city two years earlier. They entered the city but could not take the citadel before Nur ad-Din, atabeg of Aleppo surrounded Edessa with a large force. In a desperate situation Baldwin and Joscelin undertook a sortie at night. The following day Nur ad-Din caught up with them and a battle ensued in which the Christians were defeated. Count Joscelin managed to escape, however Baldwin of Marash died on the field of battle. His body was not recovered.

== Legacy ==
Baldwin's Armenian confessor, Barsegh, has left us a funeral oration in honour of Baldwin which praises him for his military skill, bravery and charm but criticises him for his "innumerable, endless and merciless injuries and blasphemies". The troubadour Marcabru may refer to Baldwin in the final stanza of his Vers del lavador, when he asks God to "conduct the count to His washing-place and lay his soul to rest".
