= Matthew of Edessa =

12th-century Armenian historian

- Born: Second half of 11th century Edessa
- Died: 1144; Edessa
- Occupation: Chronicler
- Known for: Chronicle

Matthew of Edessa (Armenian: Մատթէոս Ուռհայեցի, romanized: Mattʿēos Uṙhayecʿi; late 11th century – 1144) was an Armenian historian in the 12th century from the city of Edessa. Matthew was the superior abbot of Karmir Vank, near the town of Kaysun, east of Marash (Germanicia), the former seat of Baldwin of Boulogne. He relates much about the Bagratuni Kingdom of Armenia, the early Crusades, and the battles between Byzantines and Arabs for the possession of parts of northern Syria and eastern Asia Minor.

== Biography ==
Matthew was born in Edessa sometime in the second half of the 11th century and was a member of the Armenian Apostolic Church. He was a determined opponent of both the Greek church and the Latin church. Matthew was especially bitter against Frankish settlers, whose avaricious and imperious rule and ingratitude he condemns in his work. He was probably slain during the siege of Edessa by Zengi, atabeg of Mosul, in 1144.

== Chronicle ==
Matthew's work, Zhamanakagrutyun (Ժամանակագրութիւն, which he probably began writing in 1113 and completed before 1140, is rather chronological, covering two centuries starting in the second half of the tenth and continued by Gregory the Priest through the second half of the twelfth. In an article published in 1971 by Armenian academician Levon Khachikyan, the author established that one of the sources Matthew used to write his work was an 11th-century vardapet named Hakob of Sanahin.

He remains the only primary source of certain information about the political and ecclesiastical events of his time and area. The literary and historical knowledge of Matthew was limited, and some of his chronological data is disputed by modern scholars. Matthew was also a fervent Armenian patriot, lamenting the martyrdom of his people and exalting their heroic deeds. To him, scholars and readers are indebted for the record of two documents of importance — a letter from the Byzantine Emperor John I Tzimisces, to Bagratuni king Ashot III and a discourse delivered in the cathedral of Hagia Sophia, Constantinople, in the presence of the Emperor Constantine X Ducas by Gagik II, the exiled Bagratuni king, concerning the doctrinal divergence between the Greek and Armenian churches.

According to some scholars, Matthew was intolerant towards both Greeks and Latins, as well as unsympathetic towards Syrians, judging by allusions made by Gregory Bar Hebraeus (Abu l-Faraj) at a later date.

== Translations ==
- Chronique de Mathieu d'Édesse (962-1136), continuée par Grégoire le prêtre, French translation from 1858
- Armenia and the Crusades: Tenth to Twelfth Centuries: The Chronicle of Matthew of Edessa, translated from the original Armenian with a commentary and introduction by Ara Edmond Dostourian. Belmont, MA: National Association for Armenian Studies and Research, 1993.
- Matthew of Edessa's Chronicle, translated by Robert Bedrosian. Sophene. 2021
