= County of Edessa =

Crusader state in the Levant from 1098 to 1144

County of Edessa Comitatus Edessanus (Latin) ܐܘܪܗܝ ܐܲܬ݂ܪܵܐ (Syriac) Եդեսիոյ Կոմսութիւն (Armenian)
- 1098–1144
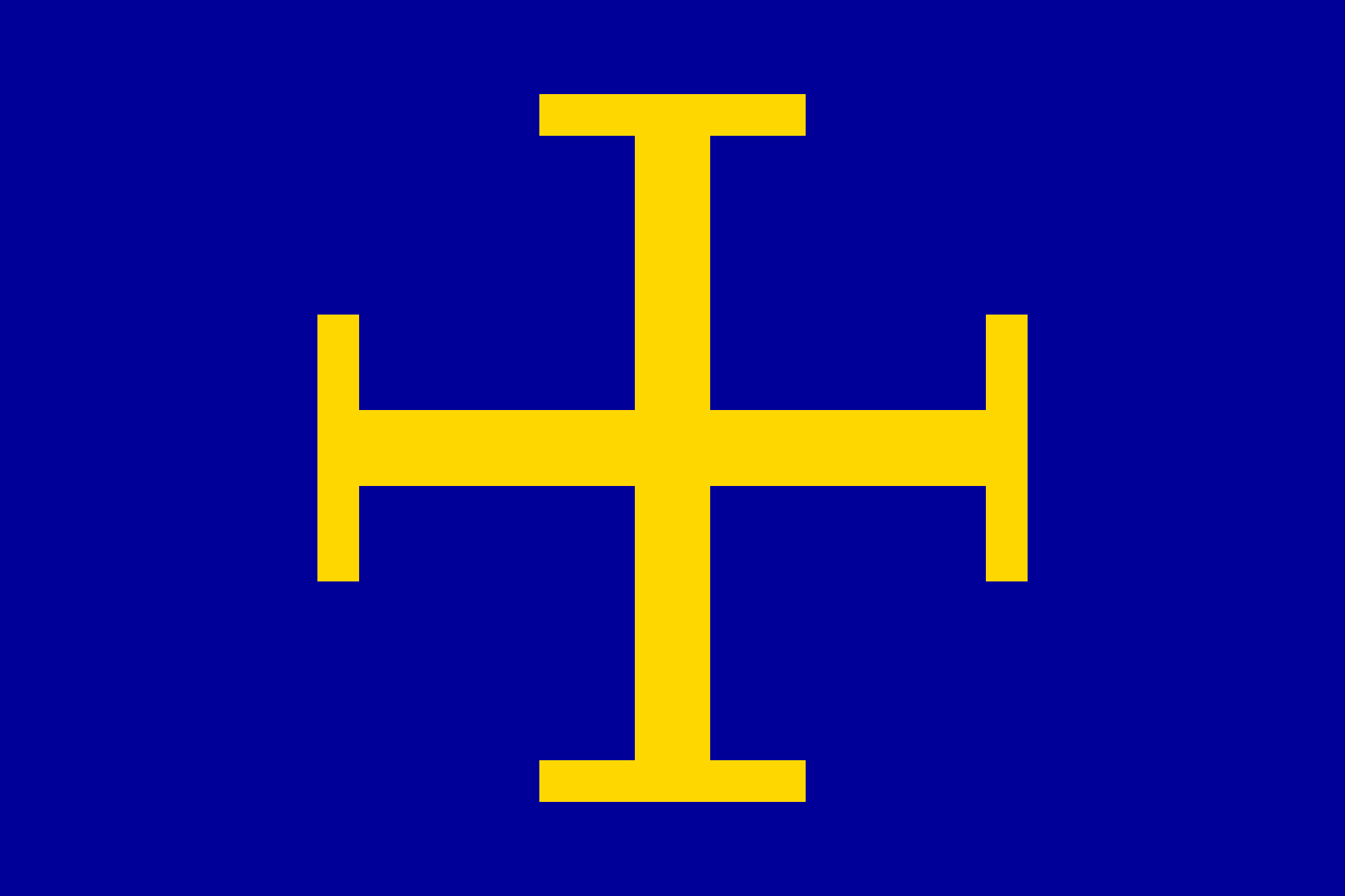
- Banner of the County of Edessa Coat of arms of the houses of Boulogne and Courtenay

- The expansion of the county of Edessa prior to 1131.
- Capital: Edessa (1098–1144; 1146) (modern-day Şanlıurfa, Turkey); Turbessel (1144–1146; 1146–1150) (modern-day Gündoğan, Oğuzeli, Gaziantep, Turkey)
- Common languages: Latin (official/ceremonial); Syriac; Old French; Italian; Armenian; Arabic; Greek
- Religion: Roman Catholicism (official), Armenian Apostolic Church, Greek Orthodoxy, Syriac Orthodoxy, Islam, Judaism (popular)
- Government: Feudal monarchy
- Count of Edessa
  - 1098–1100 (first): Baldwin I
  - 1131–1150 (last): Joscelin II
- Historical era: High Middle Ages
  - First Crusade: 1096–1099
  - Establishment: 1098
  - Conquered by Nur ad-Din Zengi, and the rest sold to Manuel I Komnenos: 1144
Preceded by	Succeeded by
Edessa under Thoros; Seljuk Empire	Emirate of Zengids; Byzantine Empire
- Today part of: Syria; Turkey

The County of Edessa (Latin: Comitatus Edessanus) was a 12th-century Crusader state in Upper Mesopotamia. Its seat was the city of Edessa (modern Şanlıurfa, Turkey).

In the late Byzantine period, Edessa became the centre of intellectual life within the Syriac Orthodox Church. As such it also became the centre for the translation of Ancient Greek philosophy into Syriac, which provided a stepping stone for the subsequent translations into Arabic. When the crusades arrived, it was still important enough to tempt a side-expedition after the siege of Antioch.

Baldwin of Boulogne, the first count of Edessa, became king of Jerusalem, and subsequent counts were his cousins. Unlike the other Crusader states, the county was landlocked. It was remote from the other states and was not on particularly good terms with its closest neighbor, the Principality of Antioch. Half of the county, including its capital, was located east of the Euphrates, far from the Mediterranean coast, rendering it particularly vulnerable. The west bank of the Euphrates was controlled from the stronghold of Turbessel. The eastern border of Edessa was claimed to be the Tigris, but the County may not have extended quite that far.

The fall of Edessa in 1144 was the first major setback for Outremer and provoked the Second Crusade. All the later Crusades, however, were troubled by strategic uncertainties and disagreements. The Second Crusade did not even try to recover Edessa, calculating it to be strategically better to take Damascus. But the campaign failed and Edessa was lost for the Christians.

== History of Edessa ==
=== Founding ===
In 1098, Baldwin of Boulogne left the main Crusading army, which was travelling south towards Antioch and Jerusalem. He went first south into Cilicia, then east to Edessa, where he convinced its lord, Thoros, to adopt him as son and heir. He also married Thoros' daughter, Arda of Armenia, who eventually became the first queen of Jerusalem. Thoros was a Christian of Armenian origin but of Greek Orthodox religion and largely disliked by his Armenian Apostolic subjects, which led to his removal from power in March 1098. Different sources claim he was assassinated or abdicated, and it is debated whether Baldwin played a role in this. Nonetheless, Baldwin succeeded Thoros as ruler, taking the title of count (having been Count of Verdun as a vassal of his brother in Europe).

In 1100, Baldwin became King of Jerusalem when his brother, Godfrey of Bouillon, died. The County of Edessa passed to his cousin Baldwin of Bourcq. He was joined by Joscelin of Courtenay, who became lord of the fortress of Turbessel on the Euphrates, an important outpost against the Seljuk Turks.

The Frankish lords formed a good rapport with their Armenian subjects, and there were frequent intermarriages; the first three counts all married Armenians. Count Baldwin's wife had died in Marash in 1097, and after he succeeded to Edessa he married Arda, a granddaughter of the Armenian Roupenid Prince Constantine. Baldwin of Bourcq married Morphia, a daughter of Gabriel of Melitene, and Joscelin of Courtenay married a daughter of Constantine.

=== Conflicts with Muslim neighbours ===
Baldwin II quickly became involved in the affairs of northern Assyria and Asia Minor. He helped secure the ransom of Bohemond I of Antioch from the Danishmends in 1103, and, with Antioch, attacked the Byzantine Empire in Cilicia in 1104. Later in 1104, Edessa was attacked by Mosul, and both Baldwin and Joscelin were taken prisoner after their defeat at the Battle of Harran. Bohemond's cousin Tancred became regent in Edessa (although Richard of Salerno actually governed the territory), until Baldwin and Joscelin were ransomed in 1108. Baldwin had to fight to regain control of the city; Tancred was eventually defeated, though Baldwin had to ally with some of the local Muslim rulers.

Baldwin II became King of Jerusalem (also as Baldwin II) when Baldwin I died in 1118. Although Eustace of Boulogne had a better claim as the late Baldwin's brother, he was in France and did not want the title. Edessa was given to Joscelin in 1119. Joscelin was taken prisoner once again in 1122; when Baldwin came to rescue him, he too was captured, and Jerusalem was left without its king. Joscelin escaped in 1123, and obtained Baldwin's release the next year.

=== Fall of the county ===
Joscelin was gravely injured during a siege in 1131 and was succeeded by his son Joscelin II. By this time, Zengi had united Aleppo and Mosul and began to threaten Edessa. Meanwhile, Joscelin II paid little attention to the security of his county, and argued with the counts of Tripoli who then refused to come to his aid. Zengi besieged the city in 1144, capturing it on 24 December that year. Joscelin continued to rule his lands west of the Euphrates, and he also managed to take advantage of the death of Zengi in September 1146 to regain and briefly hold his old capital. The city was again lost in November, and Joscelin barely escaped. In 1150 he was captured by Zengi's son Nur ad-Din, and was kept a prisoner in Aleppo until he died in 1159. His wife sold Turbessel and what was left of the county to the Byzantine Emperor Manuel I Comnenus, but these lands were conquered by Nur ad-Din and the Sultan of Rum within a year. Edessa was the first Crusader state to be created, and also the first to be lost.

== Population and demographics ==
A political map of the Near East in 1135. Crusader states are marked with a red cross.

Edessa was one of the largest of the Crusader states in terms of territory but had one of the smallest populations. Edessa itself had about 10,000 inhabitants. The rest of the county consisted mostly of fortresses. The county's territory extended from Antioch in the west to across the Euphrates in the east at its greatest extent. It also often occupied land as far north as Armenia proper. To the south and east were the powerful Muslim cities of Aleppo and Mosul, and the Jazira (northern Iraq). The inhabitants were mostly Assyrian Orthodox and Armenian Orthodox Christians, with some Greek Orthodox Christians and Arab Muslims. Although the numbers of Latins always remained small, there was a Roman Catholic archbishop. The fall of the city was the catalyst for the Second Crusade in 1146.

== Government ==
=== Counts of Edessa ===
- Baldwin I 1098–1100
- Baldwin II 1100–1118
  - Tancred of Galilee as regent, with Richard of Salerno as governor (1104–1108)
- Joscelin I 1118–1131
- Joscelin II 1131–1144, d. 1159
- Joscelin III, titular count from 1159
- Beatrice, titular countess from ‍1200

=== Lordship of Turbessel ===
Turbessel was firstly the lordship of Joscelin I when he was not yet the count of Edessa. It controlled the area west of the Euphrates, and held the border against Antioch. It then was a special holding of Courtenay counts of Edessa, and again became their seat after the loss of the city of Edessa. It was sold with the remaining parts of the county to the Byzantines just before it was conquered by Muslims. After the sale, the wife and family of Joscelin II moved with the proceeds to the Kingdom of Jerusalem, near Acre.

== See also ==
- Vassals of the Kingdom of Jerusalem
- Principality of Pir
