= Timeline of the Principality of Antioch =

The Principality of Antioch was a crusader state in northern Syria that existed between 1098 and 1268.

The crusader states and their neighbors in 1135

The remnants of the crusader states in 1190

== Background ==
867

- Late summer. Photios I, the Ecumenical Patriarch of Constantinople condemns practices of the Latin Church—especially the addition of the phrase "filioque" ("and from the Son") to the Nicene Creed and the liturgical use of unleavened bread—and excommunicates Pope Nicholas I.

869

- Late. Pope Adrian II achieves the denunciation of Photios at a council of the Byzantine prelates.

969

- October. The Byzantines re-capture Antioch that they lost to the Arabs in 637.

1016

- Melus, a Lombard nobleman from Bari, approaches Norman pilgrims at the shrine of Michael the Archangel on Mount Gargano (in southern Italy), seeking their assistance against the Byzantines.

1017

- Summer. Norman warriors come to the Lombard Principality of Capua.

1046

- Robert Guiscard—a younger son of a petty Normandian baron—settles in southern Italy.

1050s

- The Normans introduce Latin practices in the Greek churches in southern Italy.

1052

- Patriarch Michael I Cerularius closes all Latin churches in Constantinople.

1054

- July 16. The late Pope Leo IX's three envoys excommunicate Patriarch Cerularius. The event develop into a lasting schism between the Roman Catholic and Orthodox churches.

1059

- Late August. Treaty of Melfi: Pope Nicholas II confirms Robert Guiscard as prince of Capua and authorizes him to conquer the Emirate of Sicily.

1071

- August 21. Battle of Manzikert: the Seljuk Sultan Alp Arslan routes and captures the Byzantine Emperor Romanos IV Diogenes. The Seljuks start invading Asia Minor.

1070s

- A Byzantine general of Armenian origin, Philaretos Brachamios, takes control of large territories in northern Syria.

1078

- The Byzantine Emperor Nikephoros III Botaneiates appoints Brachamios as duke (or governor) of Antioch and domestikos (or commander-in-chief) of the East, thus legitimizing Brachamios' hold of northern Syria and Cilicia.

1081

- Early. Robert Guiscard sends his eldest son, Bohemond, to make preparations for his invasion of the Byzantine Empire.

1082

- February 21. Robert Guiscard takes Dyrrachium (now Durrës in Albania) in the Byzantine Empire.

1083

- Summer. The Byzantines and the Venetians chase the Normans from Dyrrachium.

c. 1084

- The Seljuks capture Antioch.

1085

- July 17. Robert Guiscard dies. Bohemond is disinherited in favor of his half-brother, Roger Borsa.
- Autumn. Bohemond seizes the Principality of Taranto in southern Italy.

1095

- March. The deputies of the Byzantine Emperor Alexios I Komnenos ask Pope Urban II at the Council of Piacenza to facilitate the recruitment of troops in Western Europe to fight against the Seljuks.
- November 27. At the Council of Clermont, Urban II proclaims the First Crusade for the liberation of the Holy Land.
- December 1. Raymond IV, Count of Toulouse is the first ruler to take the Cross in token of his decision to join the crusade.

1096

- September. Bohemond assists Roger Borsa in besieging Amalfi, but he abandons the siege as soon as he is informed of the crusade.
- October 26. Bohemond departs from Bari, accompanied by hundreds of Norman warriors, including his nephew, Tancred.

1097

- January–February. Clashes between Bohemond's troops and Byzantine communities during Bohemond's march towards Constantinople on the Via Egnatia.
- April 22. Bohemond cannot convince Alexios I to appoint him as the supreme commander of the crusader army, but he swears allegiance to the Emperor, also promising to return all former Byzantine territories to him.
- April 26. Bohemond's army crosses the Bosporus into Asia Minor.
- May 14. The crusaders lay siege to Nicaea (now Iznik in Turkey) only after Bohemond's army reaches the town.
- June 19. The Seljuk garrison of Nicaea surrenders to Alexios I's representatives. They do not allow the crusaders to enter the town, but distribute money among them.
- July 1. Battle of Dorylaeum: the crusaders route the army of the Seljuk sultan of Rum, Kilij Arslan I.
- September 14. Tancred and Baldwin of Boulogne leave the main crusader army to launch a military campaign in Cilicia.
- September 21. Tancred defeats the Seljuk garrison of Tarsus and starts negotiations about their surrender.
- September 22. Baldwin reaches Tarsus and talks the Seljuks into allowing his troops to enter the town. Outnumbered by Baldwin's troops, Tancred leaves Tarsus without resistance.
- Late September. The Armenian ruler of Adana, Oshin, provides Tancred with 200 Armenian troops. As soon as Tancred reaches Mamistra, the Seljuk garrison flees the town and the local Armenians acknowledge Tancred as their ruler. Baldwin arrives at Mamistra and the two crusader armies clash near the town. Tancred puts a garrison in Mamistra before leaving Cilicia through the Belen Pass and joins the main crusader army.
- c. October 15. The crusader leaders decide to lay siege Antioch without waiting for further reinforcements. Taking advantage of the crusaders' presence, the local Armenians expel the Seljuk garrison from Artah. Raymond IV occupies fortresses in the plains along the Orontes River. An English fleet in Byzantine service seizes Latakia.
- October 16. The governor of Antioch, Yağısıyan expels the Christians from the town. He sends envoys to the Seljuk rulers of Aleppo, Damascus and Mosul, seeking their assistance.
- October 21. The crusaders lay siege to Antioch.
- November. A Genoese fleet arrives at St Symeon.
- December 31. Duqaq, the Seljuk ruler of Damascus leads relieving forces to Antioch, but Bohemond and Robert II, Count of Flanders force him to retreat.

1098

- c. January 31. The Byzantine general, Tatikios, leaves the crusader camp at Antioch. The crusaders regard his departure as a betrayal.
- February 9. Battle of the Lake of Antioch: Bohemond, Robert II and Stephen, Count of Blois defeat the relieving army of Ridwan, the Seljuk ruler of Aleppo. The crusaders capture Harim.
- March 4. English ships arrive at St Symeon.
- March 7. Yağısıyan's troops attack the crusaders across the Iron Gate on the Orontes River, but the crusaders annihilate them.
- April–May. Secret negotiations between Bohemond and a wealthy burgher of Antioch, Firouz, who is willing to give the crusaders access to the town.
- May 4–25. Kerbogha, the atabeg (or regent) of Mosul, besieges Baldwin of Boulogne at Edessa during his march towards Antioch.
- May 29. The crusader leaders accept Bohemond's claim to rule Antioch if he achieves the surrender of the town.
- June 3. Bohemond's troops enter Antioch with Firouz's assistance and the crusaders occupy the town. Yağısıyan's son, Shams ad-Daulah, resists them in the citadel.
- June 4. Kerbogha's army reaches Antioch and lays siege to the town.
- June 10. Crusaders start fleeing from Antioch because of starvation and fear.
- June 14. A Provençal visionary, Peter Bartholomew, claims to have miraculously found the Holy Lance in the Church of Saint Peter. The discovery of the alleged relic raises the crusaders' morale.
- c. June 15. Alexios I abandons his campaign towards Antioch after Stephen of Blois, who deserted the crusaders' camp, informs him about the crusaders' desperate situation.
- June 25. The crusaders elect Bohemond as commander-in-chief.
- June 28. The crusaders break out of Antioch and route Kerbogha's troops, forcing him to abandon the siege. Shams ad-Daulah surrenders the citadel to the crusaders.
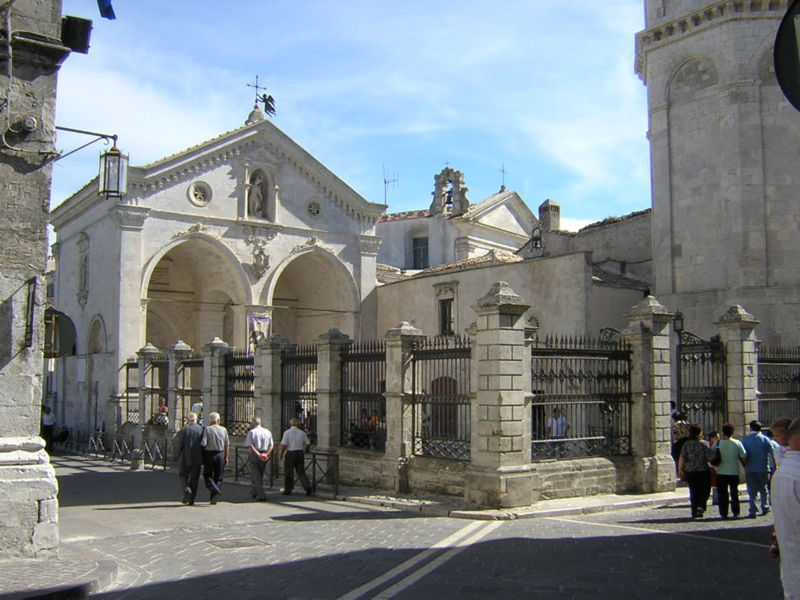
Shrine of Michael the Archangel on Mount Gargano

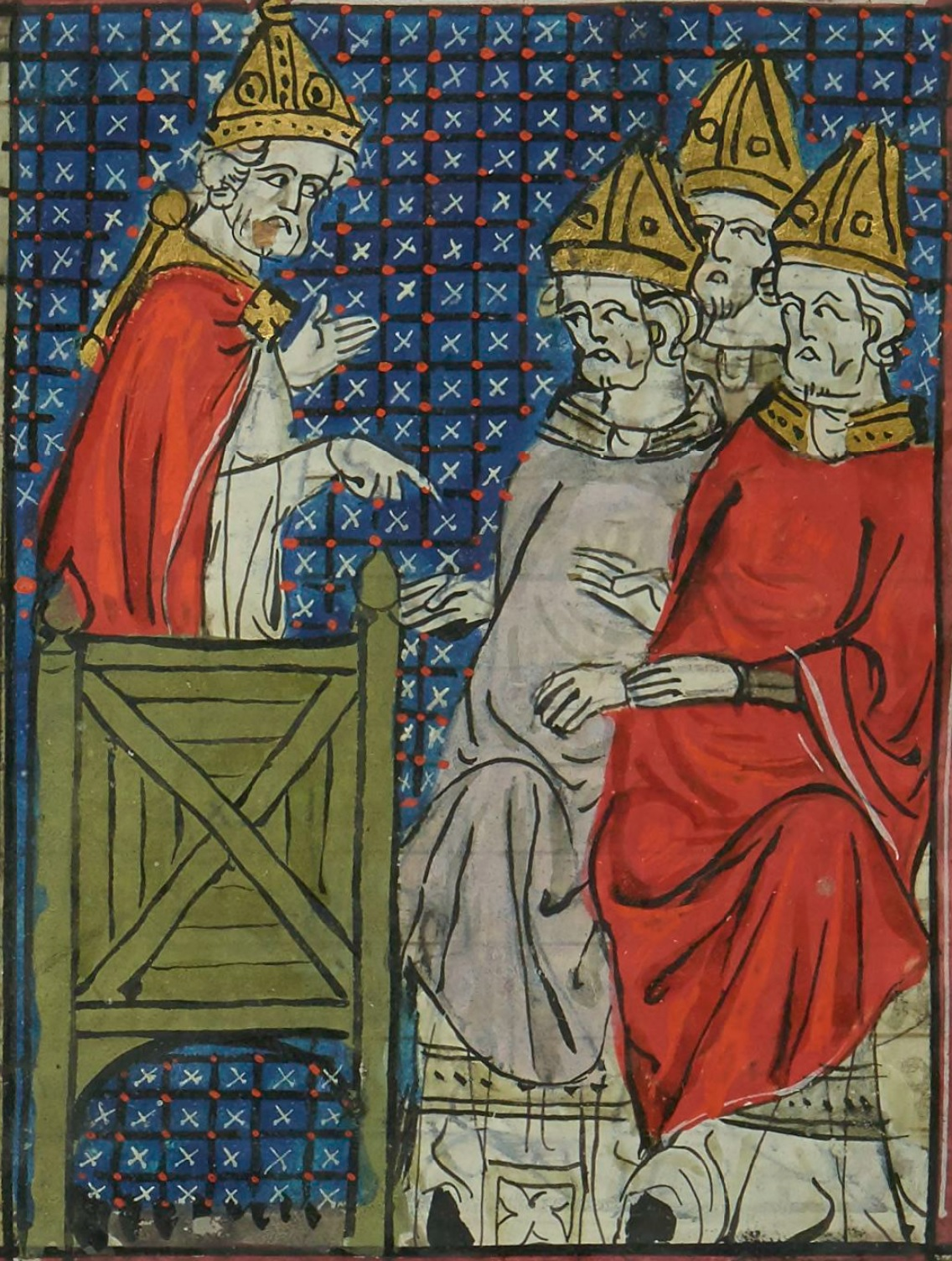
Pope Urban II preaching the First Crusade

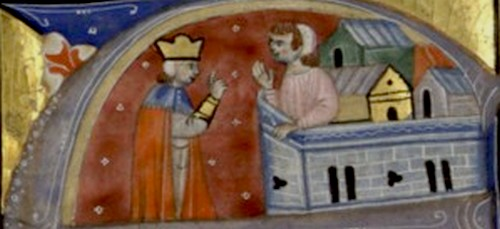
Tancred and Baldwin at Tarsus

== Crusader state ==
=== Establishment ===
1098

- Early July. The crusader leaders send Hugh, Count of Vermandois and Baldwin II, Count of Hainaut to Constantinople to inform Alexios I about the conquest of Antioch. Bohemond takes control of most parts of the town, because most crusader leaders cede the districts that they had protected during the siege to him. Raymond IV retains his district and Peter Bartholomew declares him the protector of the Holy Lance.
- July 14. Bohemond grants the Church of Saint John, 30 nearby houses and a warehouse to the Genoese in Antioch.
- c. July 17. An Aquitanian knight, Raymond Pilet, assemble an army and invades the plateau near Antioch. He forces the Muslim peasants to convert to Christianity.
- c. August 1. A plague decimates the crusaders. Their leaders retreat to the nearby regions to avoid infection.
- August. Bohemond stays in Cilicia.
- September 11. The crusader leaders urge the Pope in a letter to take over supreme command of their military expedition. In a separate document, Bohemond asks the Pope to annul the crusader leaders' treaties with Alexios I.
- c. September 25. Raymond IV takes Albara. The crusaders massacre or enslave hundreds of Muslims. Raymond IV establishes the Roman Catholic Diocese of Albara and appoints Peter of Narbonne as its first bishop. The Greek Orthodox Patriarch of Antioch, John the Oxite, consecrates Peter.
- November 18. The crusader leaders acknowledge Bohemond's right to rule Antioch, but he is required to promise to accompany them towards Jerusalem.
- December 12. Raymond IV, Robert II and Bohemond capture Maarrat al-Nu'man. The crusaders massacre the vast majority of the local Muslims.

1099

- Early January. Raymond IV denies to cede Maarrat al-Nu'man to Bohemond who returns to Antioch. Bohemond expels Raymond IV's troops from Antioch.
- March. Alexios I's envoys demand Antioch from Bohemond, but he refutes.
- Summer. After Byzantine troops are garrisoned at Latakia, Bohemond besieges the town.
- Early September. 120 ships arrive at Latakia under the command of Daimbert, Archbishop of Pisa. The Pisans assist Bohemond against the Byzantines.
- September. After returning from Jerusalem, Raymond IV, Robert II and other crusader leaders persuade the Pisans to abandon the siege of Latakia, forcing Bohemond to also lift the siege. Raymond IV took possession of Latakia on behalf of Alexios I.
- December. Bohemond and Baldwin of Boulogne, who became the first crusader Count of Edessa, come to Jerusalem.
- December 25. Daimbert is installed as the Latin Patriarch of Jerusalem. Bohemond swears fealty to him for his lands. Daimbert appoints Latin priests to the sees of Edessa, Tarsus, Mamistra and Artah.

1100

- Spring. A Byzantine fleet expels the crusader (or Frank) garrisons from the towns on the Cilician coast.
- June. Bohemond defeats Ridwan at Kella.
- c. August 15. The Armenian prince, Gabriel of Melitene, seeks Bohemond's assistance against the Danishmend emir Gazi Gümüshtigin. Bohemond hurries to Melitene (now Malatya in Turkey), but Gazi Gümüshtigin captures him. Baldwin of Boulogne relieves Melitene and garrisons his troops in the town.
- Summer. Raymond IV leaves Latakia for Constantinople to meet with Alexios I. After being accused of cooperating with the Byzantines, Patriarch John the Oxite leaves Antioch first for a nearby Orthodox monastery, then for Constantinople. Bohemond appoints Bernard of Valence as the first Latin Patriarch of Antioch.

1101

- Spring. Tancred assumes regency for the captive Bohemond. He invades Cilicia and forces the Byzantines to abandon Tarsus, Adana and Mamistra.
- Summer. Tancred lays siege to Latakia. He grants the Genoese a share in the revenues collected at the harbours of St Symeon and Latakia.

1102

- After his return to Syria, Raymond IV withdraws his troops from Latakia and marches to Tripoli to lay siege to the town.

1102–1103

- The emir of Homs, Janah ad-Daula, captures the fortress of Asfouna and massacres its Frank garrison.

1103

- April–May. Tancred occupies Latakia.
- May. Patriarch Bernard and the Armenian ruler of Raban and Kaisun, Kogh Vasil, ransom of Bohemond who returns to Antioch.
- Summer. Bohemond makes plundering raids in Aleppan territory and forces Ridwan to pay a tribute.
- Autumn. The Byzantines capture the Cilician coast.

1104

- Spring. Jikirmish, the atabeg of Mosul, and the Artuqid emir, Sökmen, invade the County of Edessa. Bohemond leads a relieving army to Edessa.
- May 7. Battle of Harran: Jikirmish and Sökmen route the united Antiochene and Edessan armies. Baldwin II, Count of Edessa, and his vassal, Joscelin I of Courtenay, Lord of Turbessel, are captured. Tancred assumes the government of Edessa.
- Late May. Ridwan takes Maarrat al-Nu'man, Artah, Kafartab and other Antiochene border forts. A Byzantine fleet captures Latakia, but the Norman garrison resists them in the citadel.
- Autumn. Bohemond leaves Antioch for Europe to call for a new crusade. Tancred again assumes the regency for him in Antioch. Bohemond's cousin, Richard of Salerno, is made the governor of Edessa.

1105

- February 28. Raymond IV dies and his cousin, William Jordan continues the siege of Tripoli.
- c. April 20. Battle of Artah: Tancred routes Ridwan.
- April–May. Tancred occupies most fortresses near Aleppo.

1106

- Spring. Tancred unsuccessfully besieges Apamea (Qalaat al-Madiq) that was captured by the Nizari (Assassin) leader Abu Tahir al-Sa'igh.
- May 26. Pope Paschal II's legate preaches a new crusade and names Bohemond as its leader at a council in Poitiers. Bohemond marries Philip I of France's daughter, Constance.
- September. Bohemond's letter to the Pope is the first extant document in which he styles himself as "prince of Antioch".
- August. Tancred captures Apamea with the support of its former Muslim ruler's sons and grants them estates in the principality.

1107

- October. Bohemond invades the Byzantine Empire from Epirus and lays siege to Dyrrachium. Venetian and Byzantine fleets deny supplies to his troops. Alexios I withdraws his troops from Cilicia, charging Oshin with its defence.
- November–October. Tancred and a Genoese fleet capture Mamistra.

1107/1108

- Tancred captures Latakia from the Byzantines.

1108

- c. August 15. Baldwin II is released from captivity in Mosul. Tancred denies to return Edessa to him unless Baldwin II swears allegiance to him. The Armenisans support the Byzantines in recapturing Mamistra.
- September. Treaty of Devol: Bohemond accepts Byzantine sovereignty and agrees to restore John the Oxite in Antioch; he also promises to persuade Tancred to cede Latakia and Cilicia to the Byzantines. Bohemond returns to southern Italy and does not make efforts to enforce Tancred to implementat the treaty.
- September 18. Patriarch Bernard mediates a reconciliation between Tancred and Baldwin II to prevent an armed conflict. Tancred restores Edessa to Baldwin II.
- Late September. Tancred routes the united armies of Jawali Saqawa, Baldwin II, Joscelin I and Kogh Vasil near Turbessel.
- Tancred styles himself as "prince of Antioch" in two charters.

Late 1108/Early 1109

- Raymond IV's son, Bertrand, lands at St Symeon and demands his father's districts in Antioch. He urges Tancred to jointly capture Jabala, but Tancred banishes him from the principality.

1109.

- March. Bertrand demands Raymond IV's inheritance near Tripoli, including fortresses captured by William Jordan. William Jordan swears fealty to Tancred in return for his assistance against Bertrand.
- April. Baldwin I summons Tancred and William Jordan in the name of the "church of Jerusalem" to the crusaders' camp at Tripoli, accusing them of injustices against Bertrand, Baldwin II and Joscelin I. The crusader leaders' council obliges Tancred to restore lands to Baldwin II and Joscelin. Baldwin I grants Tancred the Galilee in the Kingdom of Jerusalem. William Jordan is allowed to retain Tortosa (now Tartus in Syria) and Arqah as Tancred's vassal, but he is soon murdered and his domain is seized by Bertrand.
- May. Tancred captures Baniyas and Jabala.

1110

- April–May. Mawdud, the atabeg of Mosul, Sökmen el-Kutbî, the Seljuq ruler of Armenia, and the Artuqid emir Ilghazi, invade Edessa. Baldwin II accuses Tancrod of having incited the invasion.
- June. Baldwin I mediates a reconciliation between Tancred and Baldwin II, persuading Tancred to abandon his claims to sovereignty over Edessa.

1111

- March 5/7. Bohemond dies in Bari. His son, Bohemond II, inherits Taranto and Tancred continues to rule Antioch.
- Spring. Tancred fortifies Tell ibn-Mas'shar near Shaizar. The Munqidhite emir of Shaizar pays a tribute of 10,000 dinars to Tancred.
- September. The emir of Shaizar makes an alliance with Mawdud. Mawdud invades the principality, but he avoids a pitched battle after reinforcements come from Jerusalem and Tripoli to Tancred's rescue.
- Autumn. The Byzantine envoy, Manuel Boutoumites, persuades Bertrand in Tripoli to promise military assistance to Alexios I against Tancred.
- October. Alexios I grants commercial privileges to the Pisans who pledge to fight against the Byzantines' enemies.

1112

- February. Bertrand dies. His son and successor, Pons, takes possession of the estates that Bertrand held in fief from Tancred with Tancred's concession.
- Easter. After lengthy negotiations, Baldwin I and Joscelin I refutes to conclude an alliance with the Byzantines against Antioch.
- Summer-Autumn. Kogh Vasil captures Hisn Mansur. Tancred invades Kogh Vasil's domains and captures Raban. He restores Raban to Kogh Vasil in return for two fortresses.
- December 12. Tancred dies.

1113

- Early. Tancred's nephew, Roger, becomes the ruler of Antioch and marries Baldwin II's sister, Cecilia of Le Bourcq. Tancred is styled as prince in contemporaneous documents. He demands tribute from the Muslim rulers of Aleppo and Shaizar.

1114

- November 13. An earthquake destroys the citadel at Mamistra and its garrison.
- November 29. An earthquake demolishes parts of Antioch and Marash (now Kahramanmaraş in Turkey).

1115

- Pons marries Tancred's widow, Cecile of France. He takes possession of her dowry—Rugia and Arzhgan—in the Principality of Antioch,
- February. The Seljuq Sultan Muhammad I Tapar sends his general, Bursuq ibn Bursuq, to Syria to restore his rule.
- Early Summer. Tancred concludes an alliance with Ilghazi and Toghtekin, the atabeg of Damascus, against Bursuq ibn Bursuq.
- September 14. Battle of Sarmin: Tancred annihilates Bursuq's army in the valley of Danith.

1116

- Tancred and Pons besiege Marqab, but they cannot capture it.

c. 1117

- Antiochene troops seize Saone, Balatanos and Marqab.

1117

- Yaruqtash, the actual ruler of Aleppo, cedes the fortress at al-Qubba to Roger, enabling him to extract duty on the pilgrims making the Hajj from Aleppo.

1118

- Summer. Ilghazi cannot prevent Roger and the Armenian Leo from capturing Azaz near Aleppo.

1119

- Spring. Antiochene troops take Bizaah. The burghers of Aleppo seeks Ilghazi's assistance.
- June 28. Battle of the "Field of Blood": Ilghazi almost annihilates the Antiochene army; Roger perishes in the battlefield.

=== Under regents' rule ===
1119

- Early August. Baldwin II, who became king of Jerusalem in 1118, and Pons hurry to Antioch to defend the principality against Ilghazi. The Antiochene barons elect Baldwin II as regent for the absent Bohemond II. Ilghazi captures al-Atharib and Zardana, the Munqidhites seize Maarrat al-Nu'man and the nearby fortresses.
- August 14. Battle of Hab: Baldwin II forces Ilghazi and Toghtekin to withdraw from the principality.

1120

- May–June. Ilghazi and Toghtekin invade the principality, but Baldwin II prevents them from conquering new territories. Ilghazi agrees to sign a one-year truce.

1121

- April–June. Baldwin II makes raids in the region of al-Atharib, forcing Ilghazi to renew the truce.
- July–September. Taking advantage of a conflict between Ilghazi and his son, Sulaiman, Antiochene troops seize Zardana and Baldwin pillages a number of villages near Aleppo.

1122

- July. Ilghazi lays siege to Zardana, but Baldwin II relieves the town.
- November–December. After Ilghazi's death, Baldwin II occupies al-Bab and Albara.

1123

- April 9. Badr ad-Daulah Suleiman, the atabeg of Aleppo, makes peace with Baldwin II and cedes al-Atharib to him.
- April 18. Nur al-Daulak Balak, ambushes Baldwin II and imprisons him in Kharput (now Elazığ in Turkey).
- April–May. Balak captures Albara.

1124

- January. Balak, Toghtekin and Aqsunqur al-Bursuqi, the atabeg of Mosul, besiege Azaz, but a crusader army force them to abandon the siege.
- Spring. Balak's troops raid the region of Azaz.
- May 6. Salak dies fighting against a rebellious vassal.
- August 29. Ilghazi's son, Timurtash, releases Baldwin II in return for 80,000 dinars and a promise to surrender the fortresses of al-Atharib, Zardana, Azaz and Kafartab to him.
- September 6. Patriarch Bernard forbids Baldwin II to cede Antiochene territories to Timurtash.
- October 29. Baldwin II lays siege to Aleppo. Timurtash fails to support the citizens who seek Aqsunqur's assistance.

1125

- January 29. Aqsunqur forces Baldwin II to lift the siege of Aleppo.
- June 11. Battle of Azaz: Baldwin II defeats Aqsunqur.

1126

- October 23 – November 22. Bohemond II arrives at Antioch. He is installed as prince in Baldwin II's presence. Bohemond II marries Baldwin II's daughter, Alice.

1127

- Early. Bohemond II captures Kafartab.
- April. The Seljuk Sultan Mahmud II appoints Imad ad-Din Zengi to administer Mosul and Aleppo.
- Summer. Bohemond II visits Cilicia. Joscelin I invades Antioch with Seljuk reinforcements. Baldwin II and Patriarch Bernard mediate a reconciliation between the two crusader ruler.
- December. Bohemond II launches a raid against Aleppo.

1128

- May–June. Roger II of Sicily occupies Bohemond II's southern Italian domains.

1129

- Thoros I, the Armenian ruler of Cilicia, captures Anazarba.

1130

- February. Bohemond II invades Cilicia, but Thoros I's ally, Gazi Gümüshtikin routes him on the river Jihan. Bohemond II dies fighting in the battlefield. Baldwin II hurries to Antioch, but Alice tries to prevent him from assuming control of the principality, but he gains entrance to the town with Antiochene nobles' assistance. He appoints Joscelin I to administer the principality on behalf of Bohemond II and Alice's daughter, Constance, and exiles Alice to Latakia. Roger II claims Antioch as Bohemond II's last surviving male relative, but he does not take steps to assert his claim.
- Spring. Zengi's military commander, Sawar, attacks al-Atharib and other Antiochene fortresses.

c. 1131

- Leo I, Prince of Armenia, the Armenian ruler of Cilicia, captures most towns on the Cilician plain, enabling the nomadic Turkomans to freely invade the principality from Anatolia.

1130s

- Antiochene nobles offer Constance's hand to Manuel, a younger son of the Byzantine Emperor John II Komnenos

1131

- August 21. Baldwin II dies. His daughter, Melisende, and her husband, Fulk of Anjou, succeeds him in Jerusalem.
- September. Joscelin I dies. His son, Joscelin II, inherits Edessa. Alice assumes authority in the principality with the assistance of the brothers William of Zardana and Garenton of Saone. Other nobles urge Fulk to intervene.

1132

- Early. Fulk defeats Alice's allies at Chastel Rouge. He appoints Rainald I Masoir as regent for Constance. Taking advantage of the civil war, Turkomans attack Kafartab and Maarrat al-Nu'man.

1133

- Spring-Summer. Sawar makes pillaging raids against Antioch and Edessa, but Fulk defeats him at Qinnasrin. Fulk and the Antiochene nobles decide to offer Constance's hand to Raymond of Poitiers (the younger son of William IX, Duke of Aquitaine). Sawar's raids continue after Fulk's return to Jerusalem.

1135

- Early summer. Patriarch Bernard dies. The clergymen assemble to elect his successor, but the burghers proclaim Ralph of Domfront as patriarch. He fails to ask the Pope to confirm his election and emphasizes that the see of Antioch was established by Saint Peter the Apostle.

1136

- April. Raymond of Poitiers arrives at Antioch. He swears fealty to Patriarch Ralph before the Patriarch authorizes him to marry the 8-year-old Constance. Raymond assumes the government of the principality.
- Summer. Raymond invades Cilicia and captures Leo I who swears fealty to him. Raymond seizes the towns in western Cilicia.

1137

- July. Zengi besieges Fulk in the castle of Montferrand (at present-day Baarin in Syria). Raymond leaves a relieving army to Montferrand, but Fulk surrenders it to Zengi before Raymond's arrival.
- July–August. John II occupies Cilicia. Danishmend troops besiege Marash and Kaisun, but they abandon the siege because of the advance of the Byzantine army.
- August 29. John II lays siege to Antioch.
- September. Raymond swears fealty to John II and promises to renounce Antioch in return for Aleppo, Shaizar, Homs and Emesa after these towns are conquered.

1138

- Early. Raymond orders the arrest of the Muslim merchants in Antioch.
- Spring. The united Byzantine and crusader armies unsuccessfully besiege Aleppo, but they take al-Atarib and Kafartab. They lays siege to Shaizar, but John II abandons the siege in exchange for a tribute. With Raymond's support, two clerics accuse Patriarch Ralph of simony to achieve his deposition, but Ralph travels to Rome.
- May. John II enters Antioch and demands it from Raymond. After experiencing the burghers' protest, John II withdraws his troops from the town. Pope Innocent II confirms Ralph's election as patriarch and restores his jurisdiction over the archbishopric of Tyre.

Late 1138-early 1139

- Zengi captures Bizaah, Maarrat al-Nu'man and al-Atharib.

1139

- Spring. A Sicilian fleet accompanies Patriarch Ralph back to Antioch. Raymond forbids him to enter the town and the Patriarch settles in the County of Edessa.
- Earthquake destroys al-Atharib and Zardana.
- Sawar invades the principality, but Raymond overcomes him.

1140

- December 2. A synod convoked by the papal legate, Alberic of Ostia, deposes Patriarch Ralph and elects Aimery of Limoges as patriarch.

1140/1141

- Turkomans launch a pillaging raid against the principality.

1141

- Antiochene troops pillage Kafartab and Sarmin. Sawar and Turkomans raid the principality as far as the gates of Antioch.

1142

- Invading forces from Aleppo rout Antiochene troops near Harim and at the Iron Bridge.
- September–October. John II leads his forces to northern Syria and demands Antioch from Raymond. Byzantine troops pillage the suburbs of Antioch before they withdraw to winter in Cilicia.

1143

- April 8. John I dies in hunting accident in Cilicia.
- April/May. Raymond unsuccessfully besieges Bizaah.

1144

- December 23. Zengi captures Edessa. This leads to many Syriac Orthodox refugees seeking shelter in the cities and towns of the principality.

1156

- Due to the increased number of Syriac Orthodox refugees from the county of Edessa, a new church is built dedicated to Mor Barsauma who is also increasingly venerated among Franks. The first prior is a monk from the Mor Bar Sauma Monastery with which the church maintains a close ties.

== Sources ==
- Asbridge, Thomas (2000). The Creation of the Principality of Antioch, 1098–1130. The Boydell Press. ISBN 978-0-85115-661-3.
- Asbridge, Thomas (2004). The First Crusade: A New History. Simon&Schuster. ISBN 978-0-7432-2084-2.
- Barber, Malcolm (2012). The Crusader States. Yale University Press. ISBN 978-0-300-11312-9.
- Buck, Andrew D. (2017). The Principality of Antioch and its Frontiers in the Twelfth Century. The Boydell Press. ISBN 978-1-78327-173-3.
- Hamilton, Bernard (2016). The Latin Church in the Crusader States: The Secular Church. Routledge. ISBN 9780860780724.
- Harris, Jonathan (2003). Byzantium and the Crusades. The Boydell Press. ISBN 978-1-78093-831-8.
- Jotischky, Andrew (2017). Crusading and the Crusader States. Routledge. ISBN 978-1-138-80806-5.
- Lilie, Ralph-Johannes (1993). Byzantium and the Crusader States 1096-1204. Oxford University Press. ISBN 0-19-820407-8.
- Lock, Peter (2006). The Routledge Companion to the Crusades. Routledge. ISBN 9-78-0-415-39312-6.
- Maalouf, Amin (1984). The Crusades Through Arab Eyes. SAQI. ISBN 978-0-86356-023-1.
- Norwich, John Julius (1992). The Normans in Sicily. Penguin Books. ISBN 978-0-14-015212-8.
- Treadgold, Warren (1997). A History of the Byzantine State and Society. Stanford University Press. ISBN 0-8047-2630-2.
- Tyerman, Christopher (2006). God's War: A New History of the Crusades. The Belknap Press of Harvard University Press. ISBN 978-0-674-02387-1.
- Weltecke, Dorothea (2006). "On the Syriac Orthodox in the Principality of Antioch during the Crusader Period". In Ciggaar, Krijna Nelly; Metcalf, David Michael (eds.). East and West in the Medieval Eastern Mediterranean: Antioch from the Byzantine Reconquest Until the End of the Crusader Principality. Peeters Publishers. pp. 95–124. ISBN 978-90-429-1735-4.
