= Treaty of Devol =

1108 treaty following the First Crusade

- Type: Peace treaty
- Signed: 1108
- Location: Deabolis (modern day Devol, Albania)
- Negotiators: (Byzantine Empire) Nikephoros Bryennios the Younger
- Signatories: (Byzantine Empire) Alexios I Komnenos (Principality of Antioch) Bohemond I of Antioch
- Parties: Byzantine Empire Principality of Antioch
- Languages: Latin; Greek

The Treaty of Deabolis (Greek: συνθήκη της Δεαβόλεως) was an agreement made in 1108 between Bohemond I of Antioch and Byzantine Emperor Alexios I Komnenos, in the wake of the First Crusade. It is named after the Byzantine fortress of Deabolis (modern Devol, Albania). Although the treaty was not immediately enforced, it was intended to make the Principality of Antioch a vassal state of the Byzantine Empire.

At the beginning of the First Crusade, crusader armies assembled at Constantinople and promised to return any land they might conquer to the Byzantine Empire. However, Bohemond, the son of Alexios' former enemy Robert Guiscard, claimed Antioch for himself. Alexios did not recognize the legitimacy of the principality, and Bohemond went to Europe looking for reinforcements. He initiated open warfare against Alexios, laying siege to Dyrrhachium, but was soon forced to surrender and negotiate with Alexios at the imperial camp at Deabolis, where the Treaty was signed.

Under the terms of the Treaty, Bohemond agreed to become a vassal of the emperor and to defend the Empire whenever needed. He also accepted the appointment of a Greek patriarch. In return, he was given the titles of sebastos (noble) and doux (duke) of Antioch, and he was guaranteed the right to bequeath the County of Edessa to his heirs. After this treaty was signed, Bohemond retreated to Apulia and died there. His nephew, Tancred, who was his regent in Antioch, refused to accept the terms of the treaty. Antioch came temporarily under Byzantine sway in 1137, but it was not until 1158 that it truly became a Byzantine vassal.

The Treaty of Deabolis is viewed as a typical example of the Byzantine tendency to settle disputes through diplomacy rather than warfare, and was both a result of and a cause for the distrust between the Byzantines and their Western European neighbors.

== Background ==
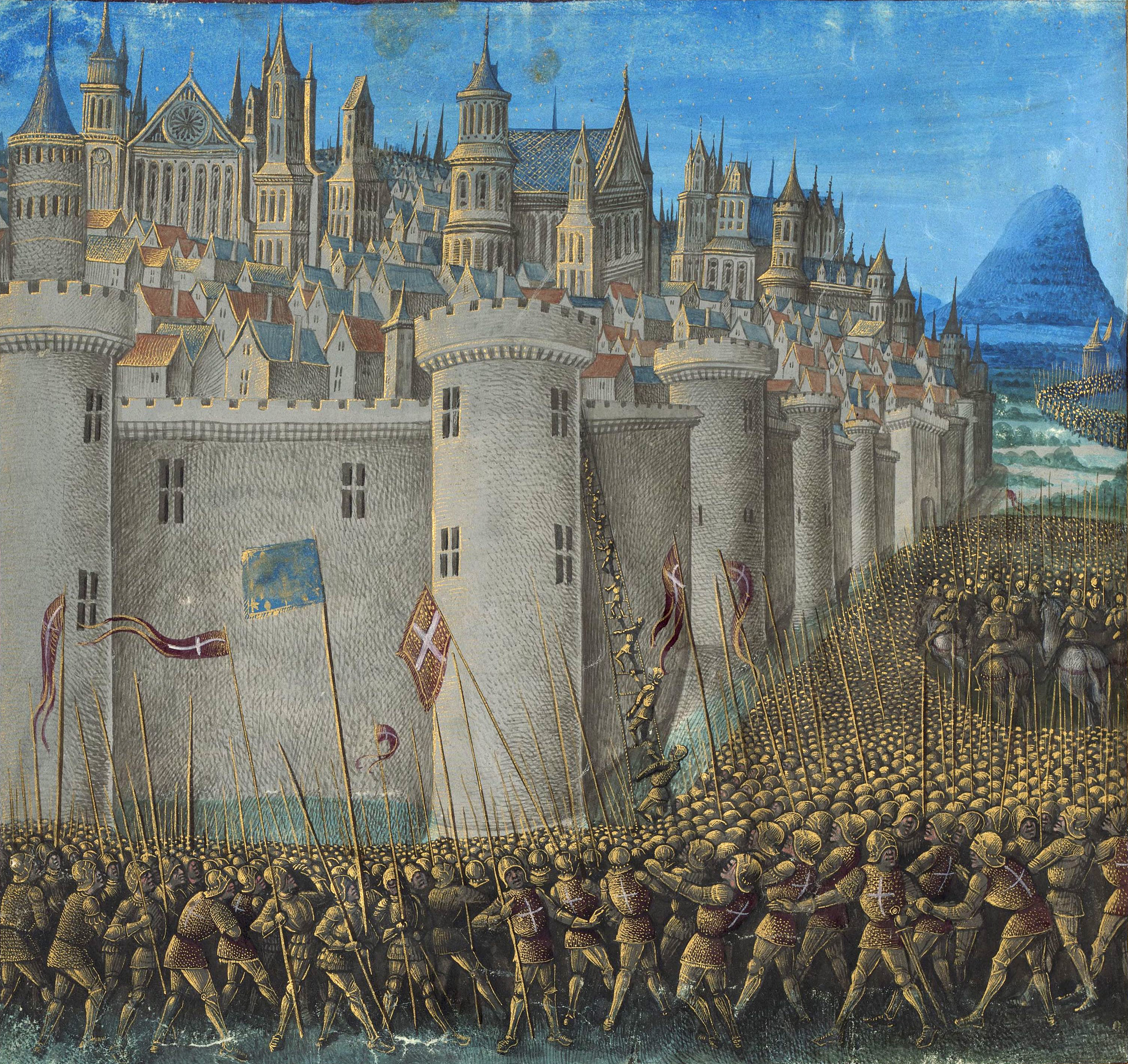
The siege of Antioch from a medieval miniature painting

In 1097, the crusader armies assembled at Constantinople having traveled in groups eastward through Europe. The Byzantine Emperor Alexios I Komnenos, who had requested only some western knights to serve as mercenaries to help fight the Seljuk Turks, blockaded these armies in the city and would not permit them to leave, until their leaders swore oaths promising to restore any land formerly belonging to the empire they might conquer on the way to Jerusalem. The crusaders eventually swore these oaths, individually rather than as a group. In return, Alexios gave them guides and a military escort. The crusaders were however exasperated by Byzantine tactics, such as negotiating the surrender of Nicaea from the Seljuks while it was still under siege by the crusaders, who hoped to plunder it to help finance their journey. The crusaders, feeling betrayed by Alexios, who was able to recover a number of important cities and islands, and in fact much of western Asia Minor, continued on their way without Byzantine aid. In 1098, when Antioch had been captured after a long siege and the crusaders were in turn themselves besieged in the city, Alexios marched out to meet them, but hearing from Stephen of Blois that the situation was hopeless, he returned to Constantinople. The crusaders, who had unexpectedly withstood the siege, believed Alexios had abandoned them and considered the Byzantines completely untrustworthy. Therefore, they regarded their oaths to have been invalidated.

By 1100, there were several crusader states, including the Principality of Antioch, founded by Bohemond I in 1098. It was argued that Antioch should be returned to the Byzantines, despite Alexios's supposed betrayals, but Bohemond claimed it for himself. Alexios, of course, disagreed; Antioch had an important port, was a trade hub with Asia and a stronghold of the Eastern Orthodox Church, and was the host of the important Eastern Orthodox patriarch of Antioch. It had only been captured from the empire a few decades ago, unlike Jerusalem, which was much farther away and had not been in Byzantine hands for centuries. Alexios therefore did not recognize the legitimacy of the Principality, believing it should be returned to the Empire according to the oaths Bohemond had sworn in 1097. He therefore set about trying to evict Bohemond from Antioch.

Bohemond then provoked more enmity from both Alexios and the Eastern Orthodox Church in 1100, when he appointed Bernard of Valence the Latin patriarch, and at the same time expelled the Greek patriarch, John the Oxite, who fled to Constantinople. Soon thereafter, Bohemond was captured by the Danishmends of Syria and was imprisoned for three years, during which the Antiochenes chose his nephew Tancred as regent. After Bohemond was released, he was defeated by the Seljuks at the Battle of Harran in 1104; this defeat led to renewed pressure on Antioch from both the Seljuks and the Byzantines. Bohemond left Tancred in control of Antioch and returned to the West, touring Italy and France for reinforcements. He won the backing of Pope Paschal II and the support of the French King Philip I, whose daughter he married. It is unclear whether his expedition had qualified as a crusade.

Bohemond's Norman relatives in Sicily had been in conflict with the Byzantine Empire for over 30 years; his father Robert Guiscard was one of the Empire's most formidable enemies. While Bohemond was away, Alexios sent an army to reoccupy Antioch and the cities of Cilicia. In 1107, having organized a new army for his planned crusade against the Muslims in Syria, Bohemond instead initiated open warfare against Alexios, crossing the Adriatic to lay siege to Dyrrhachium, the westernmost city of the Empire. However, much like his father, Bohemond was unable to make any significant advances into the Empire's interior; Alexios avoided a pitched battle and Bohemond's siege failed, partly due to a plague among his army. Bohemond soon found himself in an impossible position, isolated in front of Dyrrhachium: his escape by sea was cut off by the Venetians, and Paschal II withdrew his support.

== Settlements ==
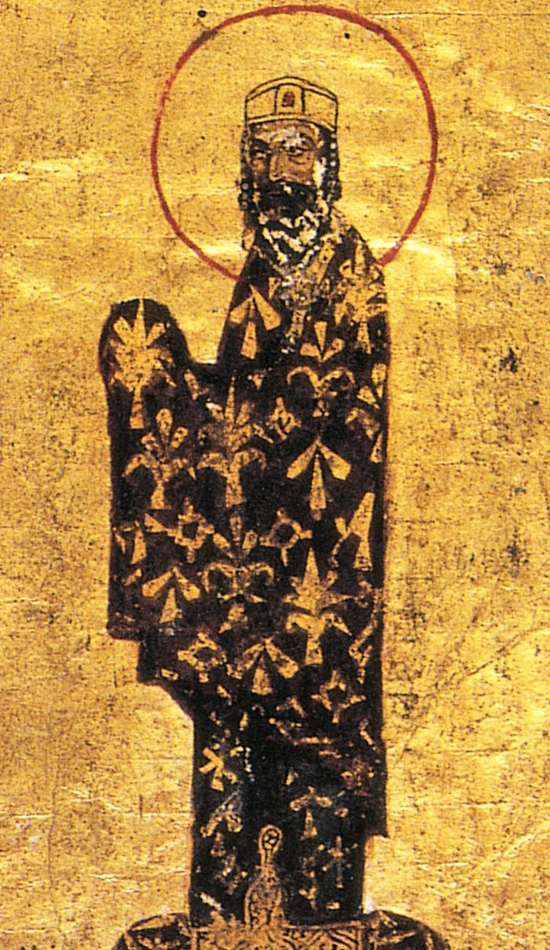
Byzantine emperor Alexios I Komnenos

In September 1108, Alexios requested that Bohemond negotiate with him at the imperial camp at Diabolis (Devol). Bohemond had no choice but to accept, now that his disease-stricken army would no longer be able to defeat Alexios in battle. He admitted he had violated the oath sworn in 1097, but refused to acknowledge that it had any bearing on the present circumstances, as Alexios, in Bohemond's eyes, had also violated the agreement by turning back from the siege of Antioch in 1098. Alexios agreed to consider the oaths of 1097 invalid. The specific terms of the treaty were negotiated by the general Nikephoros Bryennios, and were recorded by Anna Komnene:

- Bohemond agreed to become a vassal of the emperor, and also of Alexios' son and heir John;
- He agreed to help defend the empire, wherever and whenever he was required to do so, and agreed to an annual payment of 200 talents in return for this service;
- He was given the title of sebastos (noble), as well as doux (duke) of Antioch;
- He was granted as imperial fiefs of Antioch and Aleppo. The latter was not under the control of either the Crusaders or the Byzantines, but it was understood that Bohemond should try to conquer it);
- He agreed to return Laodicea and other Cilician territories to Alexios;
- He agreed to let Alexios appoint a Greek patriarch "among the disciples of the great church of Constantinople". The restoration of the Greek patriarch marked the acceptance of submission to the empire, but posed canonical questions, which were difficult to resolve.

The terms were negotiated according to Bohemond's western understanding, so that he saw himself as a feudal vassal of Alexios, a "liege man" (homo ligius or ἄνθρωπος λίζιος) with all the obligations this implied, as customary in the West: he was obliged to provide military assistance to the Emperor, except in wars where he was involved, and to serve him against all his enemies, in Europe and in Asia.

Anna Komnene described the proceedings with very repetitive details, with Bohemond frequently pointing out his own mistakes and praising the benevolence of Alexios and the Empire; the proceedings must have been rather humiliating for Bohemond. On the other hand, Anna's work was meant to praise her father, and the terms of the treaty she recorded may not be entirely accurate.

"I swear to thee, our most powerful and holy Emperor, the Lord Alexios Komnenos, and to thy fellow-Emperor, the much-desired Lord John Porphyrogenitos that I will observe all the conditions to which I have agreed and spoken by my mouth and will keep them inviolate for all time and the things that are for the good of your Empire I care for now and will for ever care for and I will never harbor even the slightest thought of hatred or treachery towards you ... and everything that is for the benefit and honor of the Roman rule that I will both think of and execute. Thus may I enjoy the help of God, and of the Cross and of the holy Gospels."
Oath sworn by Bohemond, concluding the Treaty of Devol, as recorded by Anna Komnene

The oral agreement was written down in two copies, one given to Alexios, and the other given to Bohemond. According to Anna, the witnesses from Bohemond's camp who signed his copy of the treaty were Maurus, the bishop of Amalfi, and the papal legate Renard, bishop of Tarentum, and the minor clergy accompanying them; the abbot of the monastery of St. Andrew in Brindisi, along with two of his monks; and a number of unnamed "pilgrims" (probably soldiers in Bohemond's army). From Alexios' imperial court, the treaty was witnessed by the sebastos Marinos of Naples, Roger son of Dagobert, Peter Aliphas, William of Gand, Richard of the Principate, Geoffrey of Mailli, Hubert son of Raoul, Paul the Roman, envoys from the Queen's relation (from the family of the former cral/king of Bulgaria), the ambassadors Peres and Simon from Hungary, and the ambassadors Basil the Eunuch and Constantine. Many of Alexios' witnesses were themselves Westerners, who held high positions in the Byzantine army and at the imperial court; Basil and Constantine were ambassadors in the service of Bohemond's relatives in Sicily.

Neither copy of the treaty survives. It may have been written in Latin, Greek, or both. Both languages are equally likely given the number of westerners present, many of whom would have known Latin. It is not clear how far Bohemond's concessions were known across Latin Europe as only a few chroniclers mention the treaty at all; Fulcher of Chartres simply says that Bohemond and Alexios were reconciled.

== Analysis ==
Asia Minor and the crusader states around 1140

The Treaty was weighted in Alexios' favor and provided for the eventual absorption of Antioch and its territory into the Empire. Alexios, recognizing the impossibility of driving Bohemond out of Antioch, tried to absorb him into the structure of Byzantine rule, and put him to work for the Empire's benefit. Bohemond was to retain Antioch until his death with the title of doux, unless the emperor (either Alexios or, in the future, John) chose for any reason to renege on the deal. The principality would revert to direct Byzantine rule after Bohemond's death. Bohemond therefore could not set up a dynasty in Antioch, although he was guaranteed the right to pass on to his heirs the County of Edessa, and any other territories he managed to acquire in the Syrian interior.

Bohemond's lands were to include St Simeon and the coast, the towns of Baghras and Artah, and the Latin possessions in the Jebel as-Summaq. Latakia and Cilicia, however, were to revert to direct Byzantine rule. As Thomas Asbridge points out, much of what the Emperor granted to Bohemond (including Aleppo itself) was still in Muslim hands. Neither Bohemond nor Alexios controlled Edessa, although at the time Tancred was regent there as well as in Antioch, which contradicts Lilie's assessment that Bohemond did well out of the Treaty. René Grousset calls the Treaty a "Diktat", but Jean Richard underscores that the rules of feudal law to which Bohemond had to submit "were in no way humiliating." According to John W. Birkenmeier, the Treaty marked the point at which Alexios had developed a new army, and new tactical doctrines with which to use it, but it was not a Byzantine political success; "it traded Bohemond's freedom for a titular overlordship of Southern Italy that could never be effective, and for an occupation of Antioch that could never be carried out."

The terms of the Treaty have been interpreted in various ways. According to Paul Magdalino and Ralph-Johannes Lilie, "the Treaty as reproduced by Anna Komnene shows an astonishing familiarity with western feudal custom; whether it was drafted by a Greek or by a Latin in imperial service, it had a sensitive regard for the western view of the status quo in the East Mediterranean." This regard was also present on the diplomatic initiatives Alexios undertook, in order to enforce the Treaty on Tancred (such as the treaty he concluded with Pisa in 1110–1111, and the negotiations for Church union with Pascal II in 1112). In contrast, Asbridge has recently argued that the Treaty derived from Greek as well as western precedents, and that Alexios wished to regard Antioch as falling under the umbrella of pronoia arrangements.

== Aftermath ==
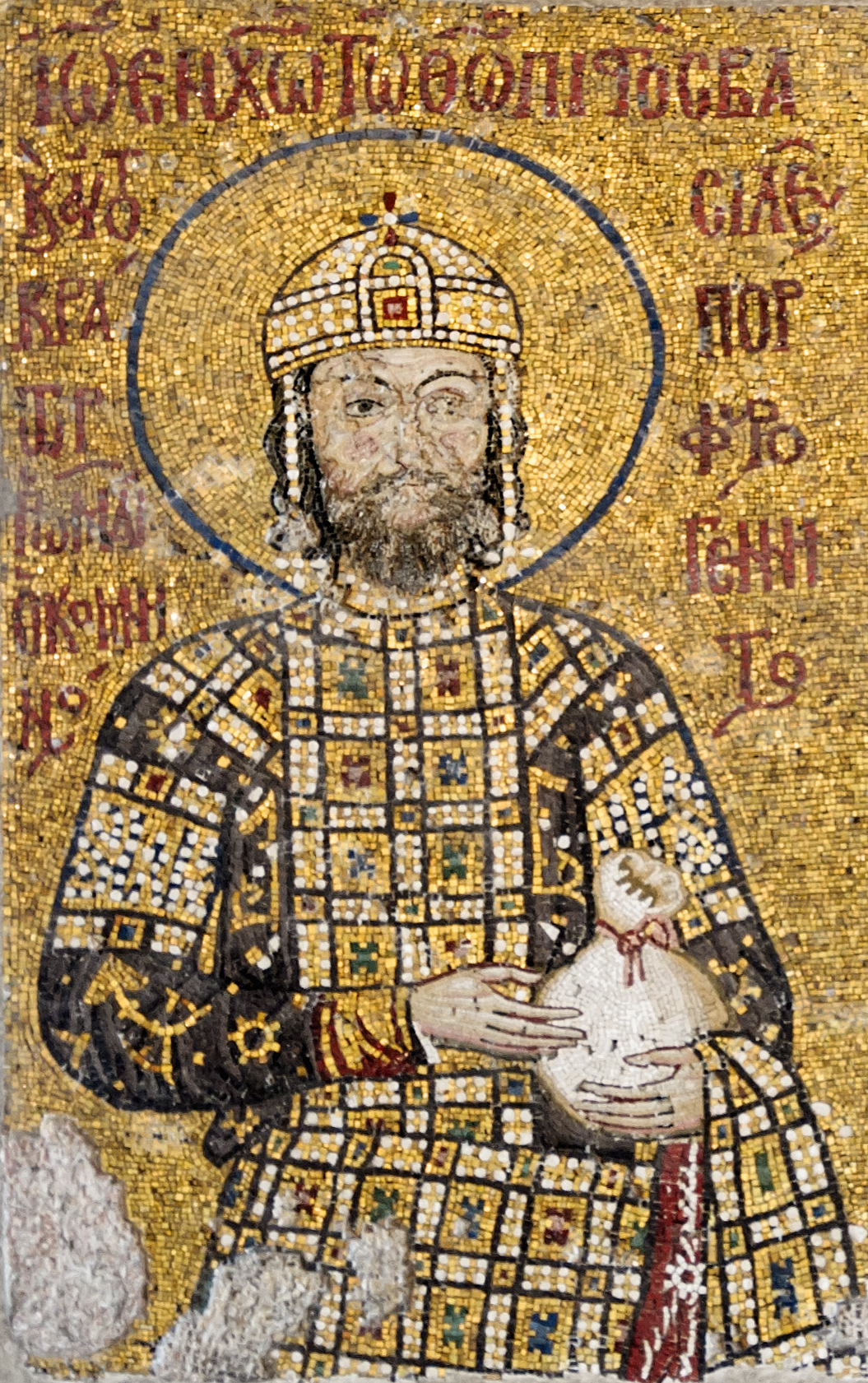
A mosaic depicting John II, son of Alexios, who captured Antioch in 1137 AD

Bohemond never returned to Antioch (he went to Sicily where he died in 1111), and the carefully constructed clauses of the Treaty were never implemented. Bohemond's nephew, Tancred, refused to honor the Treaty. In his mind, Antioch was his by right of conquest. He saw no reason to hand it over to someone who had not been involved in the Crusade, and had indeed actively worked against it (as the Crusaders believed). The Crusaders seem to have felt Alexios had tricked Bohemond into giving him Antioch; they already believed Alexios was devious and untrustworthy and this may have confirmed their beliefs. The treaty referred to Tancred as the illegal holder of Antioch, and Alexios had expected Bohemond to expel him or somehow control him. Tancred also did not allow a Greek patriarch to enter the city; instead, Greek patriarchs were appointed in Constantinople and nominally held power there.

The question of the status of Antioch and the adjacent Cilician cities troubled the Empire for many years afterwards. Although the Treaty of Deabolis never came into effect, it provided the legal basis for Byzantine negotiations with the crusaders for the next thirty years, and for imperial claims to Antioch during the reigns of John II and Manuel I. Therefore, John II attempted to impose his authority, traveling to Antioch himself in 1137 with his army and besieging the city. The citizens of Antioch tried to negotiate, but John demanded the unconditional surrender of the city. After asking the permission of the King of Jerusalem, Fulk, which he received, Raymond, the Prince of Antioch, agreed to surrender the city to John. The agreement, by which Raymond swore homage to John, was explicitly based on the Treaty of Deabolis, but went beyond it: Raymond, who was recognized as an imperial vassal for Antioch, promised the Emperor free entry to Antioch, and undertook to hand over the city in return for investiture with Aleppo, Shaizar, Homs and Hama as soon as these were conquered from the Muslims. Then Raymond would rule the new conquests and Antioch would revert to direct imperial rule. The campaign finally failed, however, partly because Raymond and Joscelin II, Count of Edessa, who had been obliged to join John as his vassals, did not pull their weight. When, on their return to Antioch, John insisted on taking possession of the city, the two princes organized a riot. John found himself besieged in the city, and was forced to leave in 1138, recalled to Constantinople. He diplomatically accepted Raymond's and Joscelin's insistence that they had nothing to do with the rebellion. John repeated his operation in 1142, but he unexpectedly died, and the Byzantine army retired.

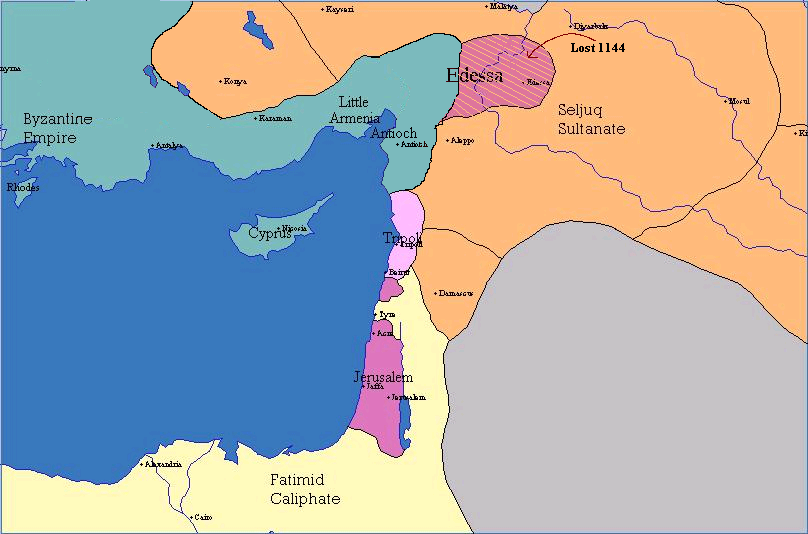
Antioch under Byzantine protection (during 1159–1180)

It was not until 1158, during the reign of Manuel I, when Antioch truly became a vassal of the empire, after Manuel forced Prince Raynald of Châtillon to swear fealty to him as punishment for Raynald's attack on Byzantine Cyprus. The Greek patriarch was restored, and ruled simultaneously with the Latin patriarch. Antioch, weakened by powerless regents after Raynald's capture by the Muslims in 1160, remained a Byzantine vassal state until 1182 when internal divisions following Manuel's death in 1180 hindered the Empire's ability to enforce its claim.

On the Balkan frontier, the Treaty of Deabolis marked the end of the Norman threat to the southern Adriatic littoral during Alexios' reign and later; the efficacy of the frontier defenses deterred any further invasions through Dyrrachium for most of the 12th century.

== Bibliography ==
=== Primary sources ===
- Anna Komnene. "Books X-XIII". The Alexiad translated by Elizabeth A. S. Dawes. Medieval Sourcebook.
- Fulcher of Chartres (1825). "Chapter XXXV". A History of the Expedition to Jerusalem 1095–1127 (translated in English by Frances Rita Ryon, edited with an introduction by Harold S. Fink [The University of Tennessee Press, 1969]).
- William of Tyre, Historia Rerum In Partibus Transmarinis Gestarum (A History of Deeds Done Beyond the Sea), translated by E. A. Babock and A. C. Krey (Columbia University Press, 1943). See the original text in the Latin library.

=== Secondary sources ===
- Angold, Michael (2004). "The Byzantine Empire, 1025–1118". In Luscombe, David; Riley-Smith, Jonathan (eds.). The New Cambridge Medieval History, Volume 4, c.1024–c.1198, Part 1. Cambridge: Cambridge University Press. pp. 217–253. ISBN 978-1-13905402-7.
- Birkenmeier, John W. (2002). "Historical Overview of Eleventh- and Twelfth-Century Byzantium". The Development of the Komnenian Army: 1081–1180. Brill Academic Publishers. ISBN 90-04-11710-5.
- Hamilton, Bernard (2003). "William of Tyre and the Byzantine Empire". Porphyrogenita: Essays on the History and Literature of Byzantium and the Latin East in Honor of Julian Chrysostomides edited by Charalambos Dendrinos, Jonathan Harris, Eirene Harvalia-Crook and Judith Herrin. Ashgate Publishing. ISBN 0-7546-3696-8.
- Holifield, Jessica. "Tancred and Bohemond: Brothers-in-arms or Arch Rivals?" (PDF). University of Leeds (School of History). Archived from the original (PDF) on 2009-03-26.
- Jotischky, Andrew (2004). "Crusade and Settlement, 1095-c. 1118". Crusading And The Crusader States. Pearson Education. ISBN 0-582-41851-8.
- Kazhdan, Alexander (2001). "Latins and Franks in Byzantium: Perception and Reality from the Eleventh to the Twelfth Century" (PDF). In Angeliki E. Laiou; Roy Parviz Mottahedeh (eds.). The Crusades from the Perspective of Byzantium and the Muslim World. Washington, D. C.: Dumbarton Oaks Research Library and Collection. ISBN 0-88402-277-3. Archived from the original (PDF) on 2008-10-01.
- Kolbaba, Tia M. (2001). "Byzantine Perceptions of Latin Religious Errors (Themes and Changes from 850 to 1350)" (PDF). In Angeliki E. Laiou; Roy Parviz Mottahedeh (eds.). The Crusades from the Perspective of Byzantium and the Muslim World. Washington, D.C.: Dumbarton Oaks Research Library and Collection. ISBN 0-88402-277-3. Archived from the original (PDF) on 2010-12-02.
- Lilie, Ralph-Johannes (2003). "The Crusades and Byzantium". In Khalil I. Semaan (ed.). The Crusades: Other Experiences, Alternate Perspectives. Global Academic Publishing. ISBN 1-58684-251-X.
- Magdalino, Paul (2002). The Empire of Manuel I Komnenos, 1143–1180. Cambridge University Press. ISBN 0-521-52653-1.
- Norwich, John Julius (1995). Byzantium:The Decline and Fall. Penguin. ISBN 0-670-82377-5.
- Richard, Jean (1999). "From the First to the Second Crusade". The Crusades, C. 1071-c. 1291. Translated by Jean Birrell. Cambridge University Press. ISBN 0-521-62566-1.
- Rowe, John G. (1966–67). "Paschal II, Bohemond of Antioch and the Byzantine Empire". Bulletin of the John Rylands Library. 44: 165–202. doi:10.7227/BJRL.49.1.8.
- Runciman, Steven (1980). The First Crusade. Cambridge University. ISBN 0-521-23255-4.
- Spinka, Matthew (June 1939). "Latin Church of the Early Crusades". Church History. 8 (2). American Society of Church History: 113–131. doi:10.2307/3160650. JSTOR 3160650. S2CID 162020930.
- Stephenson, Peter (2000). "The Rise of the West, I: Normans and Crusaders (1081–1118)". Byzantium's Balkan Frontier: A Political Study of the Northern Balkans, 900–1204. Cambridge University Press. ISBN 0-521-77017-3.
- Stone, Andrew. "John II Comnenus (A.D. 1118–1143)". Online Encyclopedia of Roman Emperors.
