= Artah =

Medieval fortified town Southeast Turkey

Artah (Arabic: أرتاح; modern-day Reyhanlı) was a medieval town and castle located 40 kilometres (25 mi) east-northeast of Antioch, to the east of the Iron Bridge on the Roman road from Antioch to Aleppo.

== Byzantine era ==
After the Arab conquest of Syria during the 7th century, the Byzantine Empire reconquered Artah in 966 as a step to reconquer Antioch a few years later. Artah's importance came from its strategic position as it was situated on vital routes connecting the Euphrates and the Orontes valleys as well as Apamea, Aleppo, and Antioch. Artah became then the residence of a strategos and was endowed, together with the nearby castle of 'Imm, with several imperial domains, making it thus attractive to Turkish raiders. Artah became a major stronghold in the Byzantine defenses in the region and the last Byzantine castle before the emirate of Aleppo.

The town was conquered on 1 July 1068 by Aleppan forces, resulting in a massacre of the local population that had fled for safety to the town and indicating the weakening Byzantine defences in the region. The city was then reconquered by Emperor Romanos IV Diogenes in December 1068 and briefly returned to Byzantine rule.

== Crusades ==
=== Siege of Antioch ===
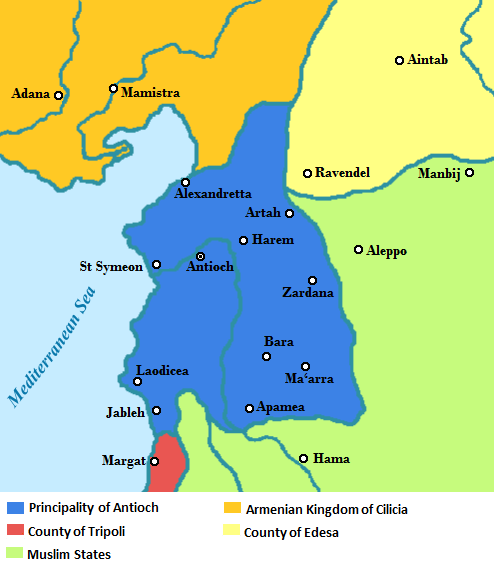
Artah within the Principality of Antioch

By the time the army of the First Crusade reached Artah in October 1097, it was in the hand of local Turkmen rulers and was one of the keys to the success in the Crusaders' siege of Antioch.

Ralph of Caen, in his Gesta Tancredi, described Artah as the "shield of Antioch" and Albert of Aachen describes it as "very well fortified with a wall and ramparts and a turreted fortress". From Marash, a detachment under Robert II of Flanders went in October 1098 to the southwest to capture Artah. Robert's force numbered 1000 armed men. Their mission was aided by the Armenian Christian population that had defeated the Islamic garrison housed there and supplied the crusaders with food. The town was then briefly besieged by a force from Antioch but this force retreated upon arrival of the main crusader forces. After this, the crusaders moved via the Iron Bridge to Antioch and the town was most likely left to its inhabitants.

After the capture of Antioch, Bohemond I of Taranto, who had contributed significantly to the fall of the city, founded the Principality of Antioch and thus broke with the Byzantine Empire which had backed the crusaders. The new principality included next to Antioch the port St Simeon, Alexandretta and Artah. Artah was a key fortress, guarding the roads from the Muslim-ruled Aleppo to the principality's capital.

=== Diocese ===
The Latin patriarch of Jerusalem, Dagobert of Pisa, consecrated four Latin bishops in the Patriarchate of Antioch in 1099 at Bohemond's request: Bernard of Valence became bishop of Artah, while Roger, Bartholomew, and Benedict were appointed to Tarsus, Mamistra, and Edessa, respectively.

Artah had not been a bishopric under the Eastern Orthodox Church, and was one of few new dioceses established by the Latins in northern Syria. It was probably established to give the prince of Antioch a suitable representative in a key fortress. The Eastern Orthodox patriarch of Antioch, John the Oxite, was not consulted despite the area being under his spiritual jurisdiction. Bernard held the see for only six months. In 1100, Bohemond had him elected patriarch of Antioch, replacing John.

Patriarch Bernard appointed a new bishop of Artah, whose name is not recorded. No secular lord is known to have held Artah during this time; it is possible that Artah was an ecclesiastical lordship, under the temporal rule of its bishop.

=== Battles ===
Two other major battles occurred at Artah during the Crusades. The first took place in 1105 between the forces of Tancred of Galilee, who was acting as regent for Bohemond, and Fakhr al-Mulk Radwan, the emir of Aleppo, in which the Crusaders were victorious. The second, or Battle of Harim, was fought in 1164 in which a force of Latins were crushingly defeated by Nur ad-Din Zangi.
