= Archdiocese of Apamea =

Former and titular archdiocese

The Archdiocese of Apamea was an ecclesiastical province of the Catholic Church in the Principality of Antioch from around 1110 to 1149.

== Diocese of Albara ==
Located on the plateau Jabal al-Sumaq, Albara was a strategically important town to the southeast of Antioch in the Middle Ages. The crusaders captured Antioch on 3 June 1098. Pope Urban II's legate, Bishop Adhemar of Le Puy, restored the Greek Orthodox patriarch of Antioch, John the Oxite, and confirmed the patriarch's authority over both the Greek and the Latin clergy. The crusaders' two most important leaders, Prince Bohemond I of Taranto and Count Raymond IV of Toulouse, wanted to secure the rule of Antioch for themselves. Raymond invaded the Jabal al-Smmaq and captured Albara on 25 September 1098.

Albara had not been an Orthodox episcopal see, but Raymond established a Latin bishopric in the town, which thus became the first Roman Catholic diocese in Syria. After consulting with his chaplains and commanders, Raymond appointed a Provençal priest, Peter of Narbonne, as the first bishop of Albara. Raymond's chaplain, Raymond of Aguilers, recorded that Raymond's troops "gave thanks to God" after Peter's appointment because "they wished to have a Roman bishop in the eastern church to look after their affairs". Historian Bernard Hamilton proposes that Peter was actually appointed for political and social reasons, because late-11th-century European rulers could not administer their realms without the assistance of high-ranking clergymen. Indeed, Raymond granted half of Albara and the nearby region to the bishop, most probably to enable Peter to rule the whole territory on his behalf. The Gesta Francorum—a reliable contemporaneous primary source—recorded that Peter went to Antioch where John the Oxite consecrated him.

== Archdiocese of Apamea ==
Bohemond's nephew, Tancred, who had ruled the Principality of Antioch on Bohemond's behalf since 1104, captured Apamea in August 1106. Apamea had been an Orthodox metropolitan see, which ranked fourth among the suffragans of the patriarchs of Antioch, but no sources imply the presence of an Orthodox prelate in the town at the time of its conquest. The Latin patriarch of Antioch, Bernard of Valence, promoted Peter of Narbonne to the rank of archbishop and transferred his see to Apamea. The first extant document styling Peter as "archbishop of Albara and archbishop of Famia" (or Apamea) was issued in 1110. Peter and his successors used both titles interchangeably for decades, but the reference to Albara disappeared from their style after about 1144. No documents refer to secular rulers in Albara, suggesting that the archbishops continued to administer the town and its region. The archbishops of Apamea also had a suffragan bishops, after the crusaders captured Baniyas and made it an episcopal see in 1109.

== Titular see ==
Nur ad-Din captured Apamea in 1149, but it remained a titular archbishopric. The titular archbishop lived in Latakia and had his own chapel in the town in 1223. In that year, Pope Honorius III authorized him to celebrate Mass in the chapel.

== Archbishops ==
- Peter of Narbonne (c. 1110–c. 1123) (from 1098 to 1110, bishop of Albara)
- Serlo (?–1144)
- Gerald (1170s)
- Anselm (1220s)
- Peter II (1240s)

== Sources ==
- Asbridge, Thomas (2000). The Creation of the Principality of Antioch, 1098–1130. The Boydell Press. ISBN 978-0-85115-661-3.
- Barber, Malcolm (2012). The Crusader States. Yale University Press. ISBN 978-0-300-11312-9.
- Hamilton, Bernard (2016). The Latin Church in the Crusader States: The Secular Church. Routledge. ISBN 9780860780724.
- Lock, Peter (2006). The Routledge Companion to the Crusades. Routledge. ISBN 9-78-0-415-39312-6.
