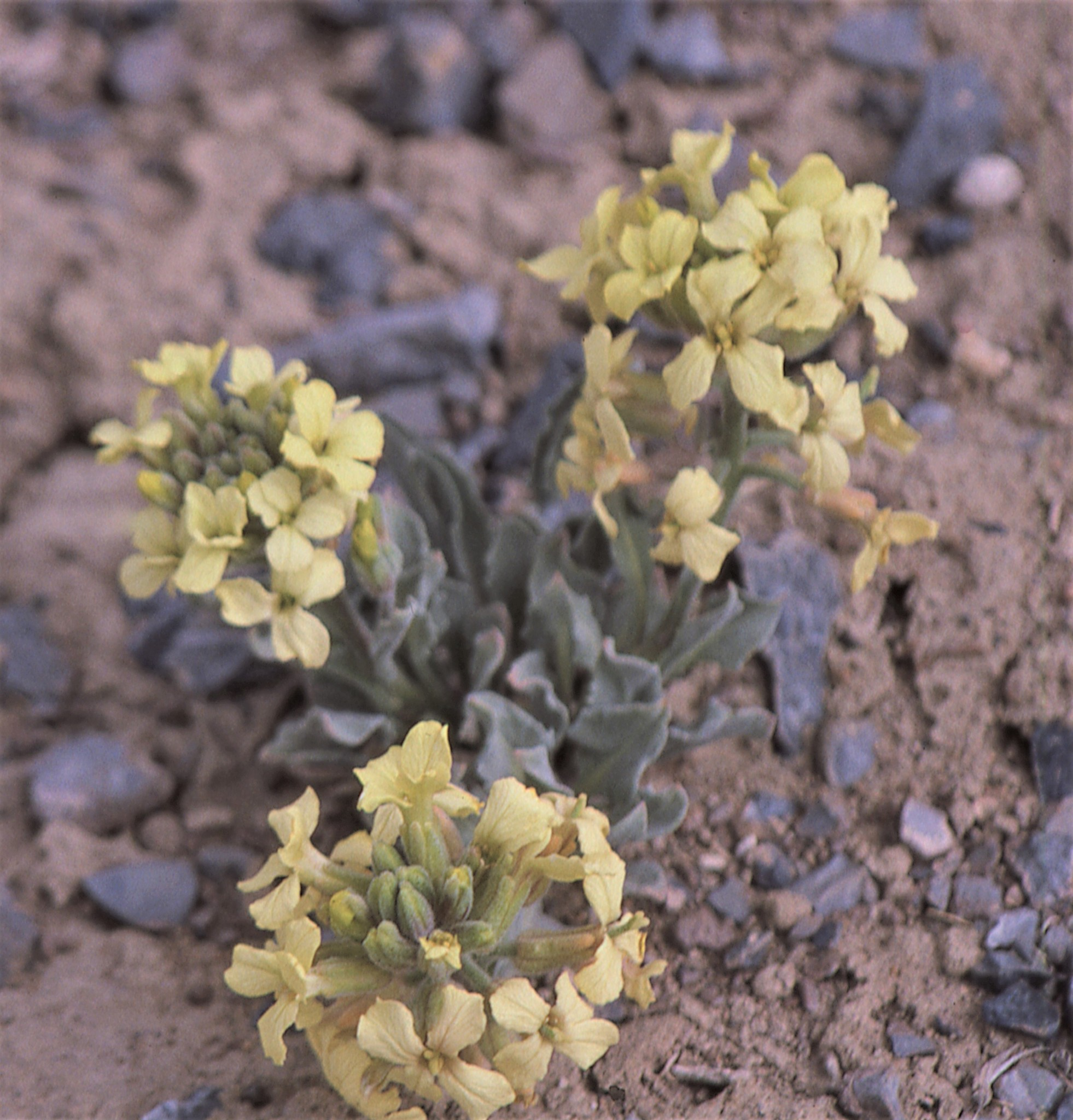
- Sterigmostemum caspicum

Scientific classification
- Kingdom: Plantae
- Clade: Tracheophytes
- Clade: Angiosperms
- Clade: Eudicots
- Clade: Rosids
- Order: Brassicales
- Family: Brassicaceae
- Genus: Sterigmostemum; M.Bieb.

Synonyms
- Anchonium DC.; Arthrolobus Steven ex DC.; Sterigma DC., nom. superfl.; Sterigmostemon Poir., orth. var.; Zerdana Boiss.

= Sterigmostemum =

Genus of plants

Sterigmostemum is a genus of flowering plants belonging to the family Brassicaceae.

Its native range is Turkey to Southwestern Siberia and Xinjiang.

Species:

- Sterigmostemum acanthocarpum (Fisch. & C.A.Mey.) Kuntze
- Sterigmostemum anchonioides (Boiss.) D.A.German & Al-Shehbaz
- Sterigmostemum billardierei (DC.) D.A.German
- Sterigmostemum caspicum (Lam.) Kuntze
- Sterigmostemum elichrysifolium (DC.) D.A.German & Al-Shehbaz
- Sterigmostemum incanum M.Bieb.
- Sterigmostemum longistylum (Boiss.) Kuntze
- Sterigmostemum ramosissimum (O.E.Schulz) Rech.f.
- Sterigmostemum schmakovii Kamelin & D.A.German
