= Sawar (governor of Aleppo) =

Sawar ibn Aytegin (died after 1146) was a military officer from Damascus who served Imad al-Din Zengi as governor of Aleppo from 1129 to 1146.

== Biography ==
Zengi seized Aleppo in 1128 and appointed Sawar his deputy in 1129. Sawar was an experienced Turkish general in the service of Taj al-Muluk Buri who left to join Zengi, possibly bringing military intelligence concerning Damascus. As deputy, he was allocated several iqta' and had delegated all powers to him. Zengi relied on Sawar to fight the Franks while he was busy consolidating his own power in Syria and Iraq, especially during the period 1131–1135.

In 1130 and 1131, Joscelin I of Edessa continually invaded Aleppan territory for which Sawar responded in kind by attacking the suburbs of al-Atharib. Seeking the support of Seljuk sultan Mahmud II against Sawar and Zengi, Joscelin denied asylum to his ally Dubays ibn Sadaqa who had fallen out of the sultan's favor.

In 1133, Sawar assembled an army of various Turkomans to attack Antioch. The king Fulk of Jerusalem responded by sending a relief force and engaged them at the castle of Montferrand, at which point they retreated. Moving on to Antioch, Fulk learned that Sawar's forces had raided Turbessel and was prepared again to move against Antioch. The king discovered the Muslim camp at Qinnasrin and attacked at night, forcing Sawar to retreat, abandoning even his tents. No sooner had Fulk made his triumphant entry into Antioch that Sawar continued his raids.

In 1134, Zengi attacked the fortresses of Amid and Qal'at al-Sur, while Sawar attacked several castles near Aleppo. The next year, Zengi and Sawar conducted a joint operation against Antioch. Sawar threatened Turbessel, Aintab and Azaz, dividing the armies of Edessa and Antioch, while Zengi captured the fortresses of Kafartab, Maarat al-Numan, Zardana and al-Atharib. Zengi was recalled to Mosul and the offensive was halted, but with significant loss of frontier castles by the Franks.

In April 1136, the city of Latakia held by the Franks was sacked by Sawar's general Afshin and a few thousand Turkoman mercenaries and the countryside ravaged. Sawar devastated the city, taking many prisoners and much booty. The Franks could not respond and the battle resulted in "such a calamity as this has never befallen the northern Franks."

Throughout 1137, Sawar and Raymond II of Tripoli conducted raids into each other's territories, with no major battles occurring. But then, on 20 April 1138, Byzantine emperor John II Komnenos and his Frankish allies launched the Siege of Aleppo. Shortly before that, Zengi and Sawar were besieging Hama and, learning of the Byzantine plans, Sawar was hastily sent back to reinforce the city. Failing at Aleppo, John then moved on to the unsuccessful Siege of Shaizar.

In 1143, Joscelin II of Edessa made a truce with Sawar instead of helping Raymond of Poiters, shattering the latter's designs on attacking Aleppo. This rift laid the foundation for the Siege of Edessa in December 1144, a catastrophic loss for the Franks.

After the murder of Zengi in September 1146, Sawar facilitated the transition of his son Nur al-Din to his new role as ruler of Aleppo.

== See also ==
- Timeline of the Principality of Antioch

== Bibliography ==
- El-Azhari, Taef (2016). Zengi and the Muslim Response to the Crusades: The Politics of Jihad. Routledge. ISBN 9780367870737.
- Gibb, Hamilton A. R. (1969). "Zengi and the Fall of Edessa" (PDF). The First Hundred Years. pp. 449–462. Archived from the original (PDF) on 2023-01-04.
- Lock, Peter (2006). The Routledge Companion to the Crusades. Routledge. ISBN 9781135131371.
- Nicholson, Robert L. (1969). "The Growth of the Latin States, 1118–1144" (PDF). The First Hundred Years. pp. 410–448. Archived from the original (PDF) on 2023-01-04.
- Runciman, Steven (1952). A History of the Crusades, Volume Two: The Kingdom of Jerusalem and the Frankish East, 1100–1187. Cambridge University Press. ISBN 9780521347716.
