= Benedict (archbishop of Edessa) =

Benedict (flourished c.1098–1104) was the first archbishop of Edessa of the Latin rite. He was probably appointed soon after Count Baldwin I founded the county of Edessa in 1098. He was consecrated by Patriarch Daimbert of Jerusalem in December 1099. He may have replaced a Byzantine bishop, if one was still in residence after the Byzantines lost the city in 1087. Although the highest-ranking churchman in the county of Edessa, Benedict was subordinated to the patriarch of Antioch in accordance with the 6th-century Notitiae episcopatuum. The contemporary historian William of Tyre calls Benedict, Daimbert and the Antiochene patriarch, Bernard, three "distinguished lights of the church".

In August 1102, Muʿīn ad-Dīn Soqman, bey of Mardin, invaded the county of Edessa and attacked the town of Saruj. Although the town was taken, the citadel was defended by Archbishop Benedict until Count Baldwin II came up with an army and relieved him.

Benedict participated in the battle of Harran on 7 May 1104. He was perhaps unarmed, since William of Tyre calls him "a man without experience in warfare". Early in the battle he was captured, but he was soon freed, either because his guard was a renegade Christian or because of a courageous rescue by Tancred of Hauteville. He is not mentioned in any record after that, and was succeeded by Hugh before 1120.

== Notes ==
Unknown	Archbishop of Edessa c. 1098 – 1104×1120	Succeeded by Hugh
