= Bernard of Valence =

Patriarch of Antioch

Bernard
- Patriarch of Antioch
- Church: Latin Church
- In office: 1100-1135
- Predecessor: John the Oxite
- Successor: Ralph of Domfront

Orders
- Consecration: 1099 by Dagobert of Pisa

Personal details
- Died: 1135

Bernard of Valence was the first Latin patriarch of Antioch, holding the see from 1100 until his death in 1135. A native of Provence, he travelled to Syria during the First Crusade and was consecrated bishop of Artah in 1099. Within months, he was appointed patriarch. He was much devoted to restoring Church organization in the lands conquered from the Muslims and steadfastly refused papal order to surrender his premier suffragan see, Tyre, to the Latin patriarch of Jerusalem. In his early years, he accompanied Christian armies to battle. Later he proved ready to assume, on several occasions, secular leadership in times of crisis. He secured the release of Prince Bohemond I of Antioch from Muslim captivity, mediated peace between Christian rulers, and took up rule in the aftermath of Prince Roger's death and during the absences of the kings of Jerusalem who ruled Antioch as regents.

== Rise ==
Bernard came from Valence in the Holy Roman Empire (modern-day France), and was probably born in the 1060s. He received no outstanding education, and yet he rose rapidly through the ranks of the Latin Church, becoming a chaplain of Bishop Adhemar of Le Puy. In 1095, Pope Urban II appointed Adhemar to represent him on the First Crusade, an expedition he had called with the aim of liberating the Eastern Orthodox in Syria from the rule of Muslim Turks. Bernard followed Adhemar east the next year. After Adhemar's death in 1098, the secular leaders of the crusade—including Prince Bohemond I of Antioch and Count Raymond IV of Toulouse—abandoned the idea of restoring the conquered lands to Eastern Christian rule.

At the request of Bohemond and Count Baldwin I of Edessa, Dagobert of Pisa–the recently elected Latin patriarch of Jerusalem–consecrated four Latin bishops in the patriarchate of Antioch in 1099; Bernard became bishop of Artah, while Roger, Bartholomew, and Benedict were appointed to Tarsus, Mamistra, and Edessa, respectively. Latin Christians sought to preserve the Church organization established by the Greek Orthodox, and Artah was one of the few episcopal sees established by the Latins in the crusader states. Bohemond escorted Bernard and the other bishops to their new dioceses, where they were to rule as the prince's secular representatives as well. Bernard's seat, in particular, was important because the fortress of Artah guarded the roads from the Muslim-ruled Aleppo to Antioch. At some point before mid-1000, Bernard fell captive and was saved by Bohemond.

Bernard held the see of Artah for only six months. In mid-1100, the patriarch of Antioch, the Greek John the Oxite, left the city; John considered himself expelled by the Latins, while William of Tyre says that John abdicated his see after "realising that a Greek could not rule over Latins effectively enough". According to William, Bernard was then elected patriarch at a meeting of the citizens and clergy, but it is likely that he was selected by Bohemond. Bernard thus became the see's first Latin patriarch, despite his lack of experience. John went to Constantinople, establishing a line of exiled Greek Orthodox patriarchs appointed by the Byzantines, who refused to accept Bernard as the legitimate patriarch. In addition, the Syriac and Armenian Orthodox–who formed the majority of the population in the northern crusader states–had their own patriarchs.

== Patriarchate ==
=== Military involvement ===
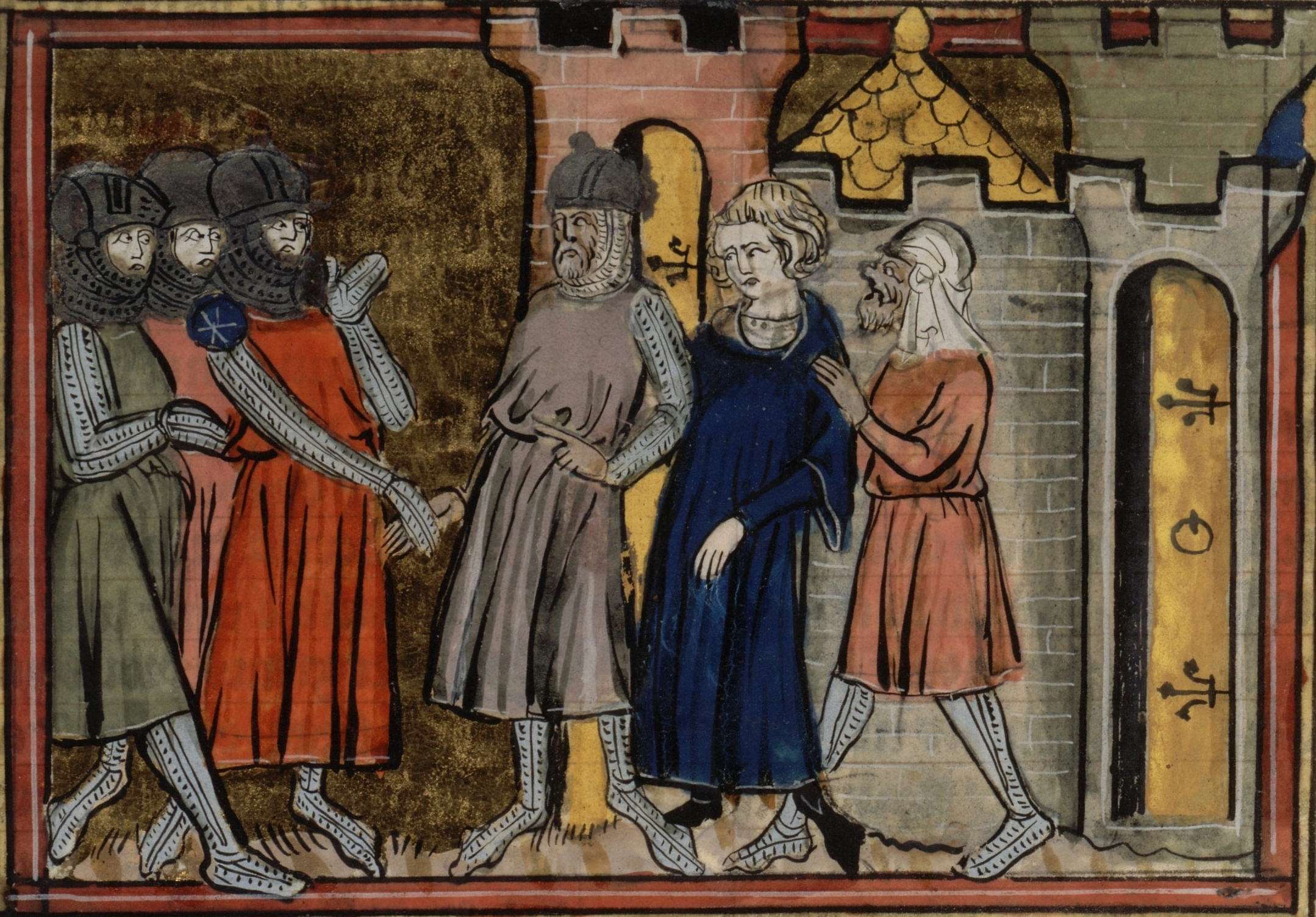
Bernard raised the ransom for the release of Prince Bohemond.

In 1100, Baldwin I of Edessa became king of Jerusalem and bestowed the County of Edessa on his kinsman Baldwin II. That same year, Bohemond was captured by the Danishmendid Turks, and his nephew Tancred of Galilee assumed control over Antioch as regent. Bernard had probably not established himself as a leader by this point. He was horrified when, after a dispute, Tancred imprisoned Raymond of Toulouse. The chronicler Matthew of Edessa relates that Tancred released Raymond at Bernard's request. Bernard and Tancred also disagreed over Bohemond's ransom, which Tancred opposed paying. Baldwin II became concerned about Tancred's ambitions and joined Bernard in raising money for the ransom, resulting in the prince's release in early 1103. This cemented Bernard's relationship with Bohemond.

Bernard played an active role in the Latins' military campaigns against the Turks. As Western canon law forbade clergy from shedding blood, Bernard probably confined himself to encouraging and absolving the troops. Before the battle of Harran in 1104, Bernard and Archbishop Benedict of Edessa heard the Latin soldiers' confession. Bernard rode into the battle on a mule. The Muslims defeated the Christians and took many prisoners, including the count of Edessa; Bernard was so overcome with fear that, as he fled, he cut off his mount's tail lest the enemy should catch him by it. He may have enjoyed the right to give or withhold blessing for military actions, and he enforced his authority through sermons as well; on the eve of the battle of Artah in 1105, he preached to the people of Antioch and ordered them to fast for three days.

With Baldwin II of Edessa in Muslim custody, Tancred again administered a captured ruler's state. Bohemond departed for Europe in 1105, leaving Tancred in charge of Antioch too. Tancred's regency in Edessa was meant to end upon Baldwin's release in 1108, but Tancred refused to cede the city. An armed conflict between the two men was brewing when Bernard intervened and pressured Tancred to step aside. The Muslim chronicler ibn al-Athir noted that neither Tancred nor Baldwin "dared oppose" Bernard, "the equivalent to the Christians of an imam to the Moslem".

=== Church organization ===
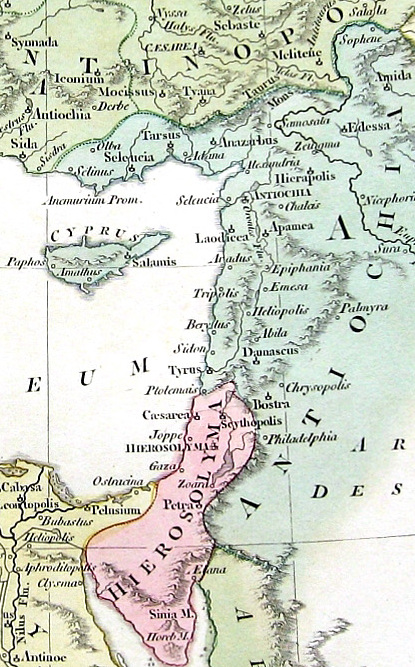
The Patriarchate of Antioch (dark green) traditionally included Tyre. Bernard never accepted its transfer to Jerusalem (pink).

Bernard appointed a successor to the see of Artah, who has not been identified. He sought to organize the Church of Antioch as it had been under its Orthodox patriarchs, appointing bishops as the secular princes conquered town after town from the Muslims. In the Orthodox tradition, the Church of Antioch had extended south all the way to Acre, and Bernard enjoyed ecclesiastical control over the County of Tripoli, which lay in the middle of this area. Problems arose after King Baldwin I of Jerusalem conquered Sidon and Beirut in 1110. Like the see of Tripoli, the sees of Sidon and Beirut had been suffragan to the see of Tyre, itself the highest-ranking see in the Church of Antioch. Baldwin insisted on having these sees assigned to the patriarch of Jerusalem, over whom he had control, and Pope Paschal II agreed in 1111. Bernard lodged an objection, which Paschal rejected.

Tancred died in 1112, having appointed his nephew Roger of Salerno to rule Antioch in the name of the young Bohemond II, who lived in Italy. In his 1112 correspondence with Bernard on the issue of Tyre, Paschal insisted that the bishops of Rome (i.e. popes) should be on good terms with the bishops of Antioch because "the same Peter made both illustrious", referring to the founding of both sees by Peter the Apostle. This argument, which suggested Antioch's equality with Rome, probably came from Bernard, but his letters do not survive. In 1113, Bernard sent a delegation to a papal council in Benevento to protest against the assignment of Tyre to Jerusalem, but Paschal initially stuck to his ruling. Shortly after, Paschal reversed his policy and informed both Bernard and Baldwin of his support for the rights of Antioch. The pope may have feared that Bernard would declare Antioch independent of Rome. In his continued insistence on the obedience of Tyre, Bernard enjoyed Prince Roger's support.

Latin lands in northern Syria, including Antioch and Edessa, were devastated by an earthquake in November 1114. Bernard ordered the afflicted people to fast for three days to atone for their sins. The following year, Bernard–in the words of Walter the Chancellor–gave "his license and patriarchal benediction" to Roger while the prince prepared to face a Turkic army. He also ordered that all Latin survivors attend a council on All Saints' Day, possibly to discuss property and spoils. Roger left the city in Bernard's care when he set off to face the Turks and won the battle of Sarmin. In a dramatic display of authority, Bernard greeted the returning prince at the head of a large procession with an assembly of sacred relics.

Around 1118, the Syrian Orthodox patriarch of Antioch, Athanasius VI bar Khamoro, excommunicated his suffragan Archbishop Basil II bar Sabuni of Edessa after a dispute over the possession of some sacred books. Basil complained to the Latins, who summoned Athanasius to a synod presided over by Bernard. The Syriac bishops spoke Arabic, and the interpreter mistranslated Athanasius's explanation, leading the shocked Latins to believe that Athanasius had sanctioned Basil over a debt of money. Believing this to be evidence of simony, Bernard had Athanasius scourged and arrested. The Syriac patriarch appealed to Roger, who reminded Bernard that he had no authority to judge Syriac Christians. Bernard's intervention left a lasting damage on Roger's efforts to cultivate a relationship with the native Christians.

=== Secular leadership ===
==== Turkish threat ====
Upon the death of Baldwin I in 1118, Baldwin II became king of Jerusalem and passed Edessa to his cousin Joscelin I. In late May 1119, news of the march of a vast Artuqid army reached Antioch. Among the Artuqids' target was the key eastern fortress of al-Atharib. Bernard urged Roger to stay encamped at Artah and request help from Baldwin II and Count Pons of Tripoli. When Roger decided to relieve al-Atharib against his advice, Bernard made his disapproval public in two sermons. In June, he personally heard Roger's confession. It appears that at this time he entrusted the spiritual care of the army to the archbishop of Apamea, Peter of Narbonne.

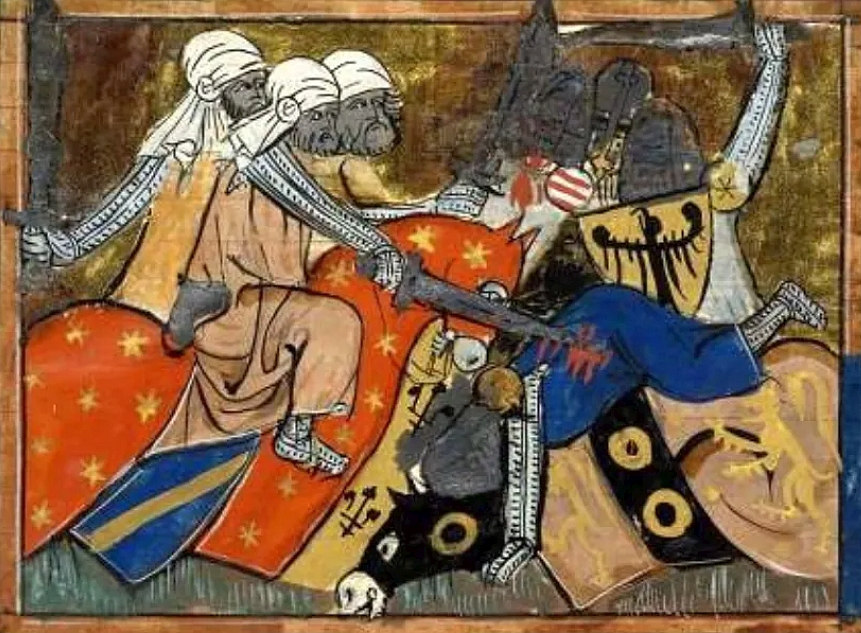
Bernard took command of Antioch's defense after the devastating defeat at the battle of the Field of Blood.

On 28 June, Roger and nearly his entire army were killed by the Turks at the battle of the Field of Blood. As an attack on Antioch was considered imminent, Bernard took command and gave a rallying speech to the populace. He had no soldiers left to defend the city and suspected the loyalty of the native Christians; therefore, he ordered that they be placed under a curfew and their weapons confiscated and redistributed among the Latin clergy and merchants, whom he tasked with watching the walls. A messenger was sent to implore King Baldwin to hurry to Antioch. Bernard apparently did not have the authority to issue a general military summons or redistribute the fiefs of the fallen, tasks which awaited Baldwin. The king arrived and took up regency in late July or early August.

After conducting military expeditions, for which he had received Bernard's approval, Baldwin returned to Jerusalem in December 1119, leaving the patriarch to rule Antioch in his name. The following year, Bernard sent for Baldwin again when the Artuqids started raiding Antiochene lands. In April 1122, Baldwin was captured by the Turks in battle and Bernard once more assumed government of Antioch. His captor, Timurtash, released him in late June 1124; in return for his release, he promised to pay a ransom, cede the Antiochene towns of Athareb, Zerdana, Azaz, Kafartab, and the Jasr, and assist Timurtash against other Muslims. He reached Antioch in late August. Bernard absolved him of this promise, arguing that Baldwin ruled only in the name of Bohemond II and thus had no right to give away Antiochene lands; Baldwin wrote to Timurtash that he could not disobey the patriarch.

==== Political struggles ====
Tyre was captured in 1124, and a few years later, Patriarch Warmund of Jerusalem consecrated the first Latin archbishop of Tyre, William. Pope Honorius II approved and also decreed that all the traditional suffragans of the archbishop of Tyre–including the bishop of Tripoli–should obey the archbishop and he, in turn, the patriarch of Jerusalem. Bernard never accepted this. In the north of the province of Tyre, he created a new see of Tortosa and probably that of Gibelet, and all the bishops of the County of Tripoli remained under his control.

Bernard was a patron of the Order of the Hospital, but does not appear to have been especially pious; rather, he was an influential statesman and secular leader. He was frequently in attendance at the princely court, witnessing a variety of significant charters, most of which dealt with secular matters. Bernard's influence grew during Baldwin's regency, and it seems that it was he who ruled when Baldwin spent time in Jerusalem. When the Turks besieged Zardana in 1122, Joscelin of Edessa led a relief force at Bernard's request. In April 1123, Baldwin was captured by the Turks. Bernard advised Joscelin to go to Jerusalem and organize a rescue mission. The king was released in August 1124.

Baldwin's regency ended with Bohemond II's arrival to Antioch in 1126. Bohemond soon fell out with Joscelin, leading to the latter's invasion of the principality. Bernard helped Baldwin reconcile the two rulers in 1128. Bernard himself never came into conflict with any of the thirteen rulers who governed Antioch, Edessa, and Tripoli during his rule; instead, he strove to co-operate with secular authorities. He established a patriarchal court and it was from his chancery that Bohemond II's sole surviving charter was issued, possibly indicating a considerable power of the patriarch during the young prince's reign. Bohemond married Baldwin's daughter Alice, and upon his death in battle against the Turks in 1130, his heir was their young daughter, Constance. Alice endeavored to rule Antioch and had a substantial backing, but her opponents reached out to her father, who once again marched north and took up government. It is not clear whom Bernard supported.

After Baldwin's death in 1131, Alice once again made a bid for power, but her brother-in-law King Fulk was summoned to take over the regency. Fulk involved Bernard and Bernard's suffragans in his administration of Antioch, but there is no evidence that Bernard took part in the decision to invite Raymond of Poitiers to marry Constance and become the new prince of Antioch. While Fulk ruled in Jerusalem, it was the aging patriarch who held authority in Antioch. Bernard won his final victory in the dispute over Tyre in 1133, when Pope Innocent II consecrated his candidate, Roman, as bishop of Byblos. The king conquered Qusair in 1134 and added it to Antiochene territories; it may have been granted to the patriarch already during Bernard's pontificate. When Bernard died in 1135, the populace acclaimed the archbishop of Mamistra, Ralph of Domfront, as his successor.

== Assessment ==
One of the principal sources about Bernard's life and career is the principality's contemporaneous chancellor, Walter. Bernard is the unofficial protagonist of Walter's chronicle, Bella Antiochena, appearing throughout both books. Walter praises Bernard's "powerful intellect" and describes him as "a man of venerable life and the most virtuous morals" and "the most experienced of all men of the time". A slightly later chronicler, William of Tyre, describes Bernard as a "simple and God-fearing man".

The historian Steven Runciman concludes that Bernard was "an able statesman, energetic, firm and courageous, but strict towards the Frankish nobility and intolerant towards the native Christians". Other historians have expressed doubts. Thomas Asbridge admits that it is difficult to know to what extent Walter inflated Bernard's importance. Bernard Hamilton argues that the patriarch was typical of the early Latin clergy in the crusader states, having no particular gift for either diplomacy or administration – "a similar man in western Europe, unless he had the backing of very powerful patrons, would probably have had an undistinguished career" – but that both the secular government and the Church of Antioch owed much to his leadership in difficult times.
