= Bara, Syria =

Bara
- بارة (Arabic)
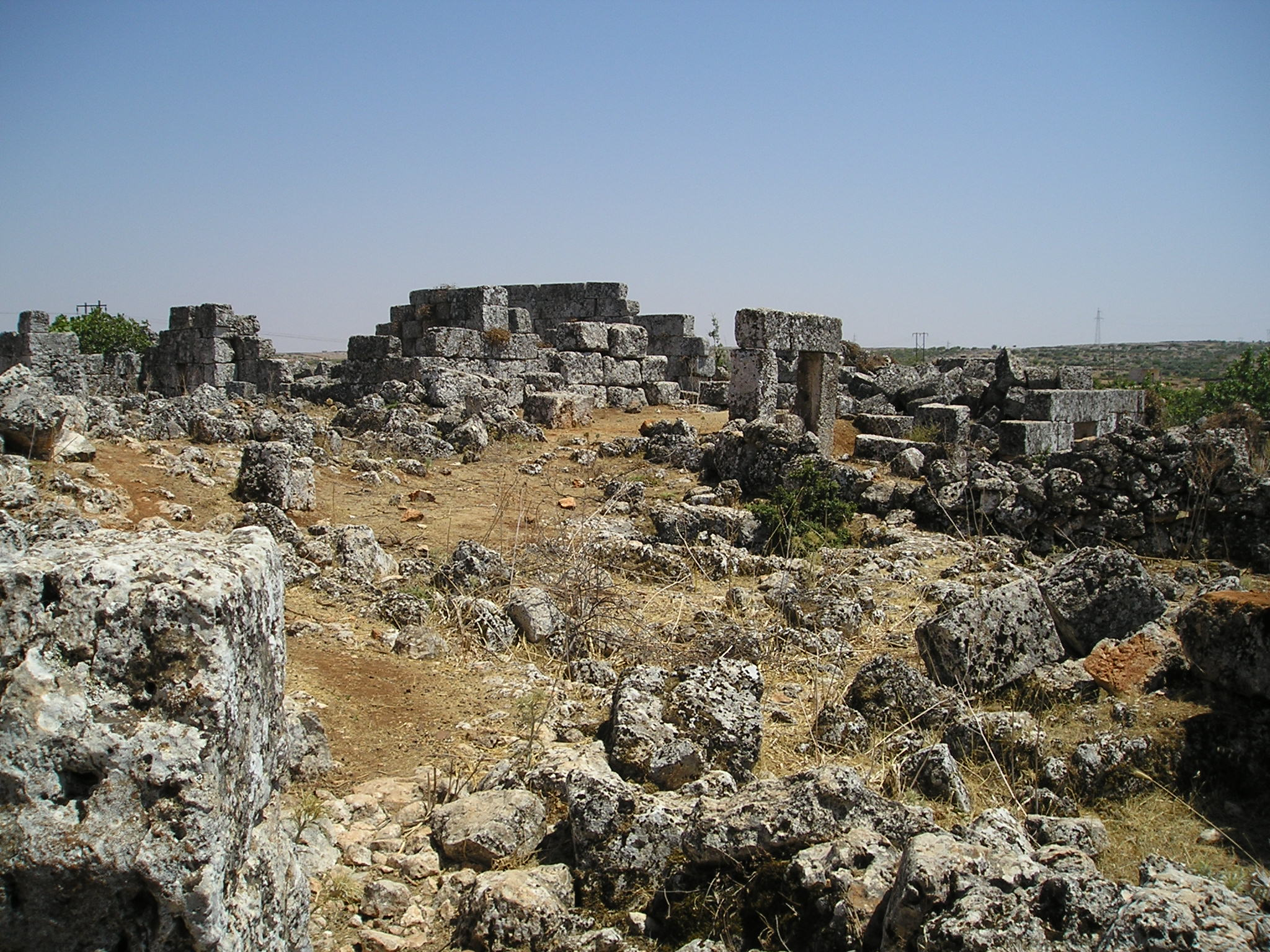
- Ruins of Bara

- Location within Syria
- 35.683°N 36.533°E
- Type: settlement
- Cultures: Byzantine
- Location: Idlib Governorate, Syria
- Part of: Dead Cities

History
- Built: 4th century AD
- Abandoned: 12th century AD

Site notes
- Condition: Ruins
- Owner: Public
- Public access: Yes

Al-Bara البارة
- Village
- Location within Syria
- Country: Syria
- Governorate: Idlib Governorate
- District: Ariha District
- Nahiyah: Ihsim

Population (2004 census)
  - Total: 10,353
- Time zone: UTC+2 (EET)
  - Summer (DST): UTC+3 (EEST)

Bara or al-Bara (Arabic: بارة) is one of the former "Dead Cities" in northwestern Syria. It is located in the Zawiya Mountain approximately 65 kilometres (40 mi) north from Hama and approx. 80 km southwest from Aleppo. Al-Bara is also a town in Ariha district. According to the Syria Central Bureau of Statistics (CBS), al-Bara had a population of 10,353 in the 2004 census. Its population is mostly Sunni Muslim.

== History ==
The settlement was established in the fourth century at an important trade route between Antioch and Apamea. Due to good location and excellent conditions to produce wine and olive oil, it flourished in the 5th and 6th centuries; this was aided by the plentiful underground water in the area. Agricultural development accelerated from the 5th century, with peasants digging to access underground springs rather than relying on waterfalls, the appearance of a network of wells and canals across the region, the cutting of private reservoirs in courtyards to collect rainwater, and the digging of large communal reservoirs.

The site’s affluence is demonstrated by well-decorated stonework, industrial-scale olive presses and a small number of decorated monumental tombs from the 6th century. The settlement is one of the only mountain sites of the Dead Cities with more than a dozen hearths. A series of ruined monasteries are close to the southern edge of the site, with Deir Sobat in good condition and Deir Debbane and al-Deir in a poorer state of repair. Church E5, in the centre of the complex, is particularly richly decorated, with the church layout and mosaic representations similar to those of nearby Apamea.

At the height of the Byzantine Empire’s power, the emperors increased their control over sites like Bara, strategically positioned to both protect mountain access and survey the more contested plains to the east. When Muslims conquered the region and trading routes were disrupted and other Dead Cities were abandoned, Bara remained inhabited, most inhabitants remained Christians, and the town even became a seat of a bishopric subordinate of Antioch under Peter of Narbonne. The centre of the town was excavated in 2007-2010, revealing a large mosque identified thanks to its fully preserved mihrab. The excavation also uncovered a bath complex which had undergone four distinct phases of occupation: the construction of late Roman thermal baths, the conversion to hammams during the early Islamic period, their abandonment during the 11th century, and their conversion to housing during the Mamluk period.

In 1098, Al-Bara was conquered by crusaders (from there they later set off to the infamous cannibalistic massacre of Ma`arat al-Numan) led by Raymond de Saint-Gilles. The town was taken by Ridwan in 1104 and retaken by Tancred a year later. However, it was retaken by Muslims from 1119 to 1122. In 1123, the town was reconquered by Belek Ghazi who built a small fortress. By 1130, it was retaken by the crusaders of Antioch until it was finally controlled by Nur ad-Din in 1148. The mainly Christian population of Al-Bara was subsequently expelled. Later in the 12th century, after a severe earthquake, the town was abandoned.

Later, in the beginning of the 20th century, a modern village of the same name arose near the site of the ancient town and till today it has grown to the size of a small town.

Al-Bara's ruins are the most extensive of all Dead Cities and are scattered among fields, olive groves and orchards. Due to its long continuous inhabitation, the ruins are also some of the most varied of the Dead Cities. Among many others, one can distinguish remains of at least five churches, three monasteries, several villas, two pyramidal tombs and one underground tomb.

On 27 November 2024, HTS rebels captured the city from the Syrian Army.

== Gallery ==
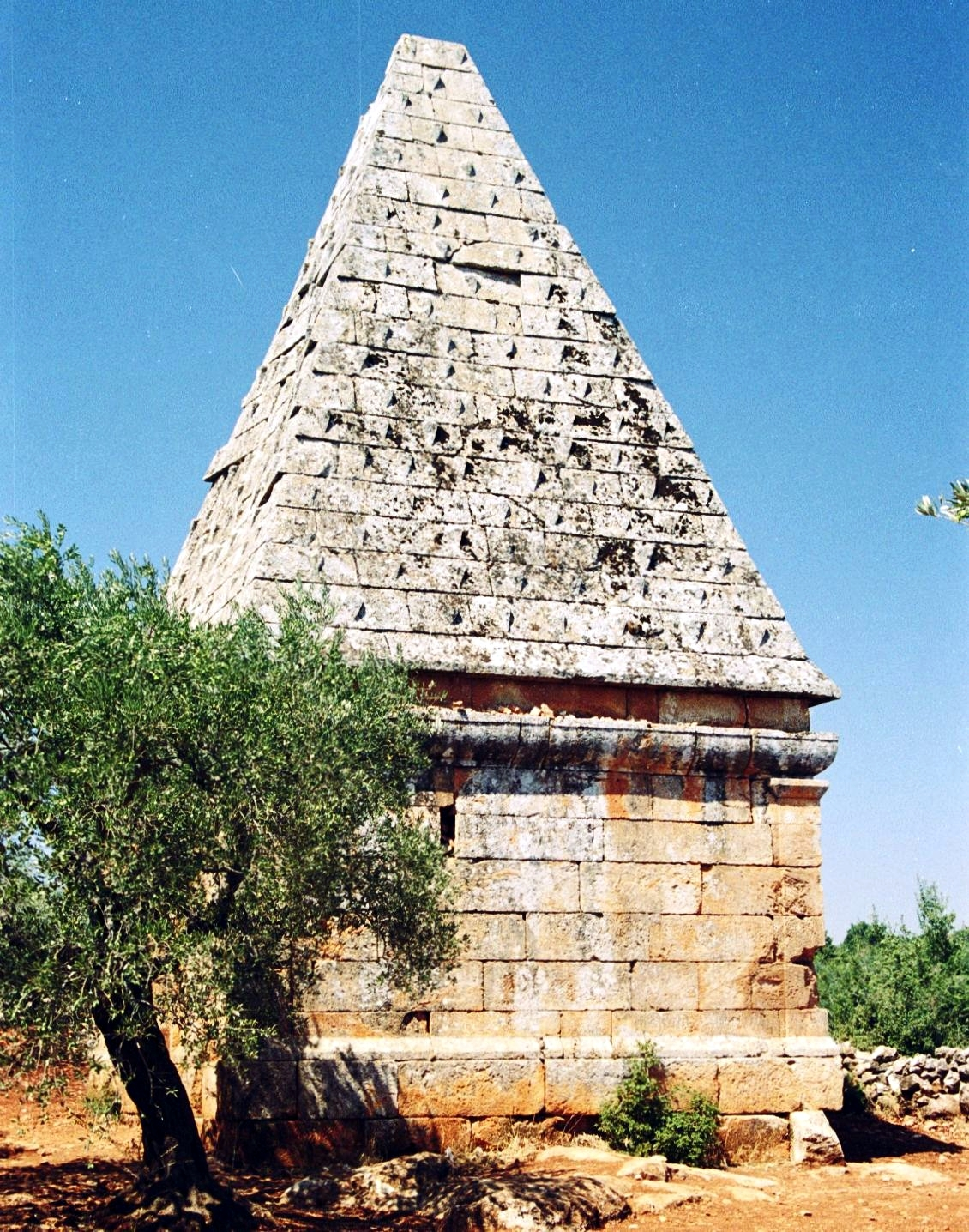
Pyramidal tomb in Bara

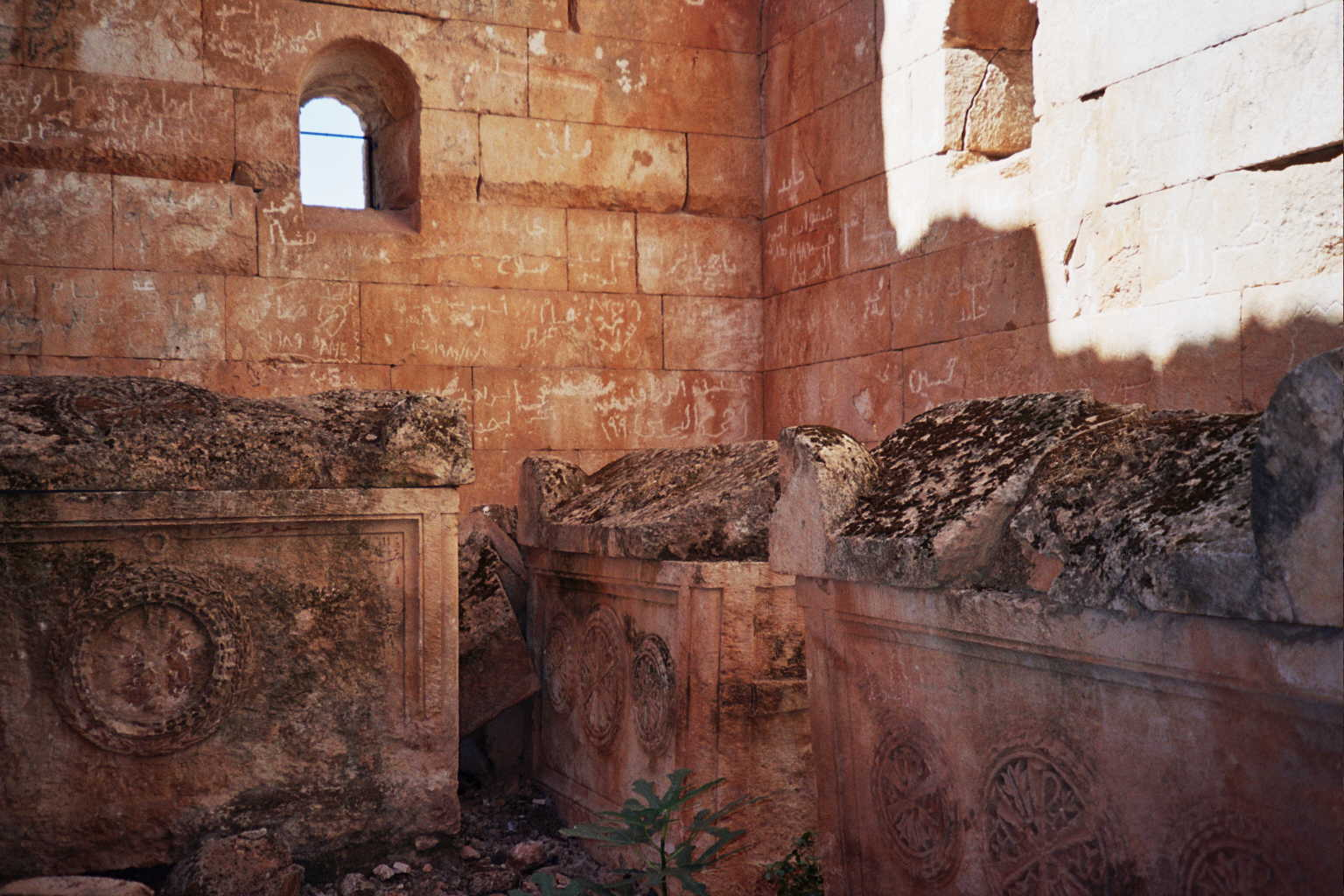
Byzantine sarcophagi in a pyramidal tomb in Bara
