= Sterigmostemum anchonioides =

Scientific classification
- Kingdom: Plantae
- Clade: Tracheophytes
- Clade: Angiosperms
- Clade: Eudicots
- Clade: Rosids
- Order: Brassicales
- Family: Brassicaceae
- Genus: Sterigmostemum
- Species: S. anchonioides

Binomial name
- Sterigmostemum anchonioides (Boiss.) D.A.German & Al-Shehbaz

Synonyms
- Zerdana anchonioides Boiss.

Genus of flowering plants

Sterigmostemum anchonioides is a species of flowering plant in the family Brassicaceae, endemic to Iran. It has been treated as the only species Zerdana anchonioides in the monotypic genus Zerdana. It is a caespitose perennial species growing in mountainous areas on stony and rocky slopes at an altitude of 3000–4000 m in the Irano-Turanian region.
