= Latin Patriarchate of Antioch =

Patriarchate of the Roman Catholic Church

Patriarch of Antioch
- Bishopric

catholic

Information
- Established: 1100
- Dissolved: 1964
- Cathedral: Church of Cassian, later Basilica di Santa Maria Maggiore

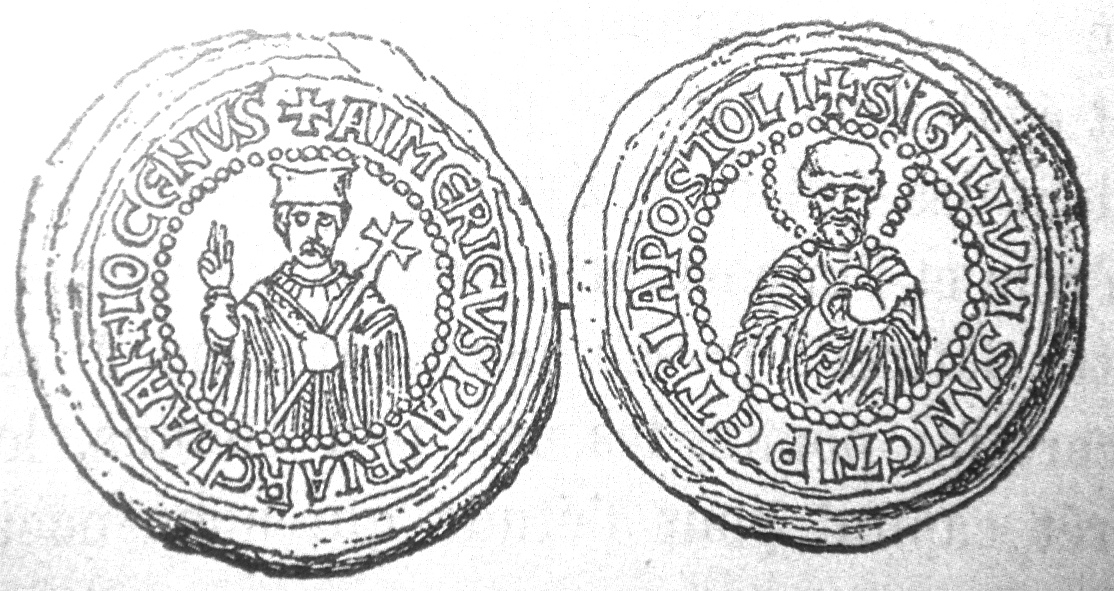
Coin of the Latin Patriarch of Antioch Aymery of Limoges (1139-1193), with bust of Aimery on the obverse

The Latin patriarch of Antioch was a prelate of the Latin Church created in 1098 by Bohemond I of Taranto, founder of the Principality of Antioch, one of the crusader states.

The jurisdiction of the Latin patriarchs in Antioch extended over the three feudal principalities of Antioch, Edessa, and Tripoli. Towards the end of the twelfth century the island of Cyprus was added. In practice they were far more dependent upon the popes than their predecessors, the Greek patriarchs. After the fall of Antioch (1268) the popes still appointed patriarchs, who, however, were unable to take possession of the see. Since the middle of the fourteenth century they were only titular dignitaries. The title was last conferred in 1925. The recipient resided in Rome and was a member of the chapter of the basilica of St. Mary Major. The Basilica of St. Mary Major was the Antioch patriarchium, or papal major basilica assigned to the patriarch of Antioch, where he officiated when in Rome and near which they resided.

== Background ==
The seat of the patriarch of Antioch was one of the oldest and most prestigious in Christendom. At one time it was the principal city of Syria; the third largest city of the Roman Empire, after Rome and Alexandria. When the East–West Schism took place in 1054, the Greek patriarchs of Antioch, Jerusalem, and Alexandria sided with the patriarch of Constantinople.

After 1054, the See of Antioch came under the influence of the Byzantine Empire. As part of his grand strategy, the Byzantine Emperor Alexios I Komnenos sought to utilize the military elan and prowess of the Frankish and European princes of the First Crusade in recovering for him the Eastern Roman Empire, including Antioch and its See.

However, after the Siege of Antioch in 1098, Bohemond I of Taranto refused to submit Antioch to Byzantine rule and set himself up as prince of Antioch.

== History ==
=== During the Crusades ===
The crusaders reinstated at first the Greek patriarch, then John IV as long as the Orthodox patriarch remained there they tried to make him a Catholic instead of appointing a rival. However, when at last he fled to Constantinople they considered the see vacant. Thereupon the Latin Christians elected (1100) a patriarch of their own, an ecclesiastic by the name of Bernard who had come to the Orient with the crusaders. From that time Antioch had its Latin patriarchs until the last incumbent Christian was put to death by the Sultan Baibars during the conquest of the city in 1268. The Greeks also continued to choose their patriarchs of Antioch, but these lived generally in Constantinople.

The Byzantine Empire was greatly offended by this and tried to re-establish either a Greek patriarchate or a joint patriarchate. Though the Treaty of Devol in 1108 nominally restored a Greek patriarch, the treaty was never enforced. Under Manuel I Komnenos there was briefly a joint patriarchate when Antioch fell under Byzantine control, but for the most part there was only a Latin patriarch. The Byzantine Empire recognized this de facto control of the See of Antioch and the Latin Patriarch soon played a key role in solidifying ties between the Crusader states and the Byzantine Empire. This represented one of the sole instances of coordinated action by Byzantine and the Franks throughout the crusader period, and led to a number of joint political, diplomatic, military, and marriage alliances. The Latin patriarch of Antioch was established to serve the Catholic members of the diocese and represent all Christians living in its territory and was one of the major ecclesiastical authorities in the Crusader states. Throughout the Crusader period both Greeks and Latins served under its hierarchy which included numerous suffragan bishops, abbots, cathedrals, monasteries, and churches under its ecclesiastical rule.

In 1206, seeing that the Byzantine Empire was no longer a threat and wanting to gain the goodwill of his Greek subjects as he feared the Armenians of Cilicia, Prince Bohemond IV restored a Greek patriarch to Antioch for a short period. The Mongols also favored a Greek patriarch, but Latin patriarchs held the see until the Crusaders had been ousted.

=== The Patriarchate in Exile ===
In 1342, the Greek patriarch transferred his seat to Damascus which grew in prominence as the city of Antioch's Christian and overall population declined.

Both Latin and Greek patriarchs continued to be appointed by the pope and the Byzantine emperor respectively during the following centuries. However, the Latin patriarch was a titular office, with its seat at the Basilica di Santa Maria Maggiore in Rome. It continued to play a role in helping to protect various isolated Christian communities in the Near East and eventually secured their unity with Rome. The last holder of this office was Roberto Vicentini, who held it until his death 1953.

=== Suppression ===
The seat remained vacant until the title was suppressed in January 1964, along with the titles of the Latin Patriarchate of Alexandria and Constantinople, it was no longer mentioned in the Vatican yearbook (rather than being announced as being abolished). This was after Pope Paul VI met with Ecumenical Patriarch Athenagoras I of Constantinople, showing the Latin Church by this point was more interested in reconciliation with the Eastern Church, abolishing the titular title.

== List of Latin religious heads of Antioch ==
- Peter I of Narbonne (1098–1100) (Bishop of Albara, ordained by John, the Greek Patriarch)

=== Latin patriarchs of Antioch ===
- Bernard of Valence (1100–1135)
- Ralph I of Domfront (1135–1139)
- Aimery of Limoges (1139–1193)
- Ralph II (1193–1196)
- Peter of Angoulême (1196–1208)
- Peter of Ivrea (1209–1216)
  - vacant (1216–1219)
- Peter of Capua (1219), never consecrated
- Rainier (1219–1225)
- Albert of Rezzato (1226–1245)
- Opizo Fieschi (1247–1292), in exile after 1268

=== Titular Latin patriarchs of Antioch ===
  - Unknown
- Gerardus Odonis (1342–1349)
- Pedro Amariz (Pedro Clasquerin) (1375–1380 Died)

...

- Václav Králík z Buřenic (1397–1416)
- Ludovico (1476)

...

- Gerard de Crussol (Bastet de Crussol) (1471–1472 Died)
- Lorenzo Zanni (Lorenzo Zane) (1473–1485 Died)
- Giovanni Michiel (1497–1503 Died)
- Alfonso Carafa (bishop) (1504–1505)

...

- St. Juan de Ribera (1568–1611 Died)
- Tomás Dávalos de Aragón (1611– 1621 Died)
- Luigi Caetani (1622–1626)
- Giovanni Battista Pamphili (1626–1629), later Pope Innocent X of Rome
- Cesare Monti (1629–1633)
- Fabio Lagonissa (1634–1652)
  - Unknown
- Giacomo Altoviti (1667–1693)
- Michelangelo Mattei (1693–1699)
- Charles Thomas Maillard de Tournon (1701–1710)
- Giberto Bartolomeo Borromeo (1711–1717)
- Filippo Anastasio (1724–1735)
- Joaquín Fernández Portocarrero (1735–1760?)
- Giulio Maria della Somaglia (1788–1795)
  - Unknown
- Antonio Despuig y Dameto (1799–1813)
  - Vacant (1813–1822)
- Lorenzo Girolamo Mattei (1822–1833)
  - Unknown – possibly Fabio Maria Asquini listed as the Titular Archbishop of Tarsus (Antioch) from 1837 and was later Latin Patriarch of Constantinople.
- Albert Barbolani di Montauto (1856–1857)
- Iosephus Melchiades Ferlisi (1858–1860, became titular Latin Patriarch of Constantinople
  - Vacant (1860–1862)
- Carolus Belgrado (1862–1866)
- Paulus Brunoni (1868–1877)
  - Vacant (1877–1879)
- Petrus De Villanova (1879–1881)
- Placidus Ralli (1882–1884)
  - Vacant (1884–1886)
- Vencentius Tizzani (1886–1892)
  - Vacant (1892–1895)
- Francesco di Paola Cassetta (1895–1899)
- Carlo Nocella (1899–1901), died 1903, became titular Latin Patriarch of Constantinople.
- Lorenzo Passarini (1901–1915)
- Ladislao Michele Zaleski (1916–1925)
- Roberto Vicentini (1925–1953)
- Vacancy from 1953 until the Latin titular patriarchate was officially abolished in 1964.

== See also ==
- Patriarchate of Antioch
- Latin Patriarchate of Alexandria
- Latin Patriarchate of Constantinople
- Latin Patriarchate of Jerusalem
- Roman Catholic Archdiocese of Apamea
- Eastern Catholic patriarchates of Antioch in communion with the Pope:
  - Maronite Patriarchate of Antioch
  - Melkite Catholic Patriarchate of Antioch
  - Syriac Catholic Patriarchate of Antioch

== Sources and external links ==
- List of Latin Patriarchs of Antioch by GCatholic.org
