= Peter of Narbonne (bishop of Albara) =

Peter I of Narbonne
- Bishop of Albara
- In office: 1098–1100

Orders
- Ordination: by John VII the Oxite

Peter of Narbonne was Bishop of Albara (south east of Antioch) from 1098–1100, after the Norman crusader army led by Robert Curthose captured the city mostly inhabited by Muslims. Peter was ordained bishop by John the Oxite, the (Greek) patriarch of Antioch. The appointment was made by the patriarch because there was no Orthodox bishopric already established in Albara now populated by Christians. The new Latin bishop's elevation marked the beginning of a Latin Church resident in the East, greatly encouraged by the Crusaders to see the local Greek ecclesiastics replaced by Latin ones.

Peter's office was a precursor of the Latin Patriarchate of Antioch established two years later in Antioch headed by a Latin patriarch, the first being Bernard of Valence.

== See also ==
- Latin Patriarchate of Antioch
