= Battle of Artah =

Battle in 1105 in Turkey

- Part of the Crusades
Date	20 April 1105
Location	Artah, northern Syria (modern-day Reyhanlı, Turkey)
Result	Crusader victory

Belligerents
Principality of Antioch	Seljuk Turks of Aleppo

Commanders and leaders
Tancred of Galilee	Fakhr al-Mulk Ridwan; General Sabawa

Strength
1,000 knights 3,000 infantry Total: 4,000	7,000 infantry Unknown cavalry Total: 7,000+

Casualties and losses
Unknown	Nearly all infantrymen killed

The Battle of Artah was fought on 20 April 1105 between Crusader forces and the Seljuk Turks at the town of Artah near Antioch. The Turks were led by Fakhr al-Mulk Ridwan of Aleppo, while the Crusaders were led by Tancred of Galilee, regent of the Principality of Antioch. The Crusaders were victorious and proceeded to threaten Aleppo.

== Background ==
After the Crusader defeat at the Battle of Harran in 1104, all of Antioch's strongholds east of the Orontes River were abandoned. In order to raise additional Crusader reinforcements, Bohemond I of Antioch embarked for Europe, leaving Tancred as regent in Antioch. Tancred began to recover the lost castles and walled towns.

In mid-spring 1105, the inhabitants of Artah, located 25 miles (40 km) east-northeast of Antioch, may have expelled Antioch's garrison from the fortress and allied with Ridwan or surrendered to the latter upon his approach to the fortress. Artah was the last Crusader-held fortress east of the city of Antioch, and its loss would have been a direct threat to Antioch. It is unclear if Ridwan thereafter garrisoned Artah.

== Battle ==
With a force of 1,000 cavalry and 3,000 infantry, Tancred laid siege to the castle of Artah. Ridwan tried to interfere with the operation, gathering a host of 7,000 infantry and an unknown number of cavalry. 3,000 of the Muslim infantrymen were volunteers. Tancred gave battle and defeated the army of Aleppo, who reportedly won by his "skillful use of ground." The Franks may have gained a tactical advantage by using the "device of a feigned retreat." The Muslim infantry entered the Crusader camp after the initial retreat and were then surprised and killed by the Crusaders, with only a small number escaping.

== Aftermath ==
Tancred proceeded to consolidate the principality's control of its eastern frontier regions, precipitating the flight of local Muslims from the areas of the al-Jazr and Lailun, although several were slain by Tancred's forces. After his victory, Tancred expanded his conquests east of the Orontes with only minor opposition. The next actions of consequence in northern Syria were the Battle of Shaizar in 1111 and the Battle of Sarmin in 1115.
