= Port Saint Symeon =

Medieval harbour of the city of Antioch

Coordinates: 36.0904°N 35.9669°E

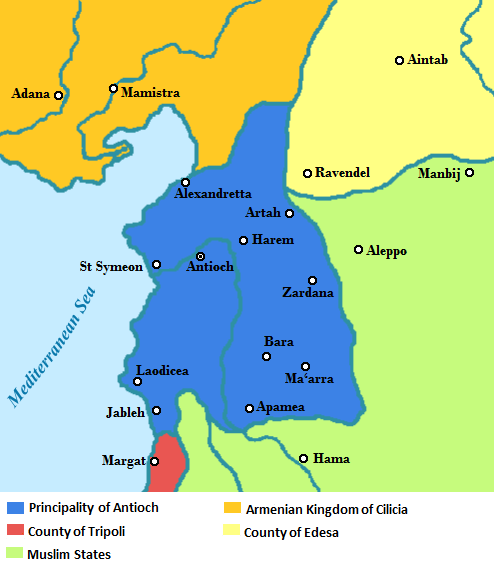
- Port of St Symeon on the Mediterranean coast of the Principality of Antioch in 1135 AD.

St Symeon or Port St Symeon (Turkish: Samandağ or Suadiye) was the medieval port for the Frankish Principality of Antioch, located on the mouth of the Orontes River. It may be named after Saint Simeon Stylites the Younger, who dwelt on a mountain only six miles from St Symeon, or the original Saint Simeon Stylites, who was buried in Antioch.

== History ==
Seleucia Pieria had been the Roman port of Antioch, but silting and an earthquake had rendered it unusable. The harbour of St Symeon, some fourteen kilometres to the west of Antioch, was the main harbour of Antioch. Its possession was essential for the armies of the First Crusade during the siege of Antioch and it seems that the crusaders maintained a force there for this time.

In November 1097, the Crusaders besieging Antioch were heartened by the appearance of reinforcements in a Genoese squadron at St Symeon, which they were then able to capture. The besiegers were very short of food, and supplies from Cyprus to St Symeon were subject to frequent attack on the road from the port to the Crusader camp. On 4 March 1098 a fleet said to be commanded by the exiled claimant to the English throne, Edgar the Ætheling, sailed into St Symeon with siege materials from Constantinople. Another raid by the Turkish defenders of Antioch seized the materials from the Crusaders, but the Crusaders successfully counter-attacked, killing (it was said) as many as fifteen hundred Turks. The port was taken by the forces of Kerbogha of Mosul after the crusaders had taken Antioch and were besieged themselves but was reconquered after the battle of Antioch on 28 June 1098.

At the start of the Crusader period St Symeon was only a local port, but in the second half of the twelfth century Nur ed-Din and later Saladin brought order to Moslem Syria, reviving its prosperity and opening it as a trade route to Iraq and the Far East. St Symeon shared in the prosperity as one of the ports used by the merchants of Aleppo until the Mongol conquests of the thirteenth century resulted in a movement of trade routes to the north. In 1268 a Mameluk army under Baibars captured St Symeon and then went on to destroy Antioch. The city and its port never recovered.

St Symeon gives its name to a Crusader style of pottery.

== See also ==
- Ras al-Bassit, the site of another port of the Principality of Antioch
