= John the Oxite =

John the Oxite or John Oxeites was the Greek Orthodox patriarch of Antioch (as John IV or V) from c. 1089 until 1100, when he was exiled by Prince Bohemond I of Antioch. He fled to the Byzantine Empire and continued to govern those parts of the patriarchate that were under Byzantine rule. He was a prominent writer of religious texts, and reformer of religious and charitable foundations.

Prior to his patriarchate, John was a monk. In 1085 or 1092, he wrote a treatise on the practice of charistikion, whereby the emperor could grant a monastery to a private person for a specified period. He was critical of the practice, which he blamed for a decline in monasticism.

John took office as patriarch before September 1089, when the city of Antioch was still under Muslim rule. He did not leave Constantinople for Antioch until 1091. At the time of the Siege of Antioch in 1097 by the Christian armies of the First Crusade, he was imprisoned by the Seljuk governor Yağısıyan, who suspected his loyalty. On occasion he was hung from the city walls and his feet were hit by iron rods. According to the Historia belli sacri (c. 1131), after the siege the Christian women of the city went to release the imprisoned patriarch, only to find that he could not stand, his legs having been weakened by so long a confinement.

When the crusaders captured the city in 1098, John was released and restored to power. The crusaders decided to establish a Latin bishop in Albara (where there was no Greek bishop established), Peter of Narbonne. Since Peter had been consecrated by patriarch John, both prelates coexisted for a while, until John became politically inconvenient for the ruling prince. Bohemond accused him of conspiring with Byzantine emperor Alexios I, and John was exiled to Constantinople. In October 1100, he formally renounced his office and entered the Hodegon monastery. He was succeed in Antioch by a Latin, Bernard of Valence, who thus established the line of Latin patriarchs of Antioch.

John made enemies among the monks of his new home and was forced to leave the Hodegon for the island of Oxeia in the Sea of Marmara, where he was eventually buried. He wrote invective "panegyrics" against Alexios I, whom he blamed for the state of the empire; against those who owned "cities within cities", especially tax collectors; and against the Azymites (i.e., Latins, who used unleavened bread in the Eucharist). The latter treatise may have been occasioned by the visit to Constantinople of Grosolanus, Archbishop of Milan, in 1112.

John never returned to Antioch and after him new Greek Orthodox patriarchs of Antioch were appointed in Constantinople, remaining there until it was possible to restore them in Antioch late in the 13th century.

== Sources ==
- Gautier, Paul (1970). "Diatribes de Jean l'Oxite contre Alexis I^{er} Comnène". Revue des Études Byzantines. 28: 5–55. doi:10.3406/rebyz.1970.1427.
- Kazhdan, Alexander (1991). "John IV (V) Oxeites". In Kazhdan, Alexander (ed.). The Oxford Dictionary of Byzantium. Oxford and New York: Oxford University Press. ISBN 0-19-504652-8.
- Runciman, Steven (2005) [1980]. The First Crusade. Cambridge: Cambridge University Press.
- Thomas, John P. (1987). Private Religious Foundations in the Byzantine Empire. Washington, D.C.: Dumbarton Oaks. ISBN 9780884021643.
