= List of wars involving the Seljuk States =

The following article shows the list of conflicts involving each of the major Seljuk States from their foundation to dissolution.

== Wars involving Seljuk's Dominion at Cend and the early Seljukids (985–1037) ==
Here is a list of conflicts involving the Seljuk's Dominion at Cend and the early Seljukids.

Seljuk victory

Seljuk defeat

Another result

| Conflict | Seljuks and allies | Opponent(s) | Results | | | | |
|---|---|---|---|---|---|---|---|
| Conflict | Seljuks and allies | Opponent(s) | Results | Capture of Jand (985) | Seljuk dynasty | Oghuz Yabgu State | Victory: Seljuk establishes his dominion at Jand. |
| Karakhanid–Samanid wars (990-991) | Samanid Empire Supported by:- Seljuk dynasty Oghuz Yabgu State | Kara-Khanid Khanate | Defeat: Transoxiana & Fergana valley annexed by Karakhanids.; Seljuks submit to Karakhanids. | | | | |
| Loss of Jand (1016) | Seljuk dynasty | Oghuz Yabgu State | Defeat: Tughril Bey abandones Jand to join his uncle Arslan Isra'il with Ali Tegin. | | | | |
| Ali-Tegin's Conquest of Bukhara (1020) | Kara-Khanids of Bukhara Supported by:- Seljuk dynasty | Kara-Khanid Khanate | Victory: Ali Tegin conquers Bukhara and Samarkand. | | | | |
| Chaghri Bey's Renaissance Expedition at Lake Van (1021) | Seljuks and other Turkoman tribes | Byzantium; Kingdom of Georgia; Bagratid Armenia | Victory: Chaghri Beg repels attacks by Christian realms. | | | | |
| Ghaznavid-Qarakhanid Campaigns against Ali-Tegin (1025) | Kara-Khanids of Bukhara Supported by:- Seljuk dynasty | Ghaznavid Empire; Kara-Khanid Khanate; Khwarzmshah Altuntash | Stalemate: Initial defeat of Ali-Tegin and subjugation of his territories.; Imprisonment of Arslan Isra'il in Kalinjar.; Recapture of Bukhara and Samarkand by Ali-Tegin with the defeat of Yusuf Qadir Khan after the withdrawal of Mahmud.; Defeat of Ali-Tegin by Qadir Khan and Abu Bakr Hasiri in 1026. | | | | |
| Battle of Ribat-i-Farawa (1028) | Seljuk dynasty | Ghaznavid Empire | Defeat: Seljuks defeated by Arslan Jazhib in battle.; Imprisonment and execution of Seljuk tribesmen. | | | | |
| Battle of Dabusiyya (1032) | Kara-Khanids of Bukhara Supported by:- Seljuk dynasty | Ghaznavid Empire; Khwarzmshah Altuntash | Stalemate: Ghaznavid commander Altuntash mortally wounded during the fighting. | | | | |
| Shah Malik's campaign against Seljuks | Seljuk dynasty Supported by:- Harun; Ismail Khandan | Oghuz Yabgu State | Defeat: Seljuks expelled to Ghaznavid Khorasan. | | | | |
| Seljuk-Ghaznavid War (1035-1040): Battle of Nasa (1035); Battle of Nishapur (1038); Battle of Sarakhs (1038); Battle of Dandanaqan | Seljuk dynasty | Ghaznavid Empire | Victory: Establishment of the Great Seljuk Empire. | | | | |

== Wars involving the Seljuk Empire (1037–1194) ==
- List of battles involving the Seljuk Empire

== Wars involving the Sultanate of Rum (1077–1308) ==
The Seljuk Sultanate of Rum was a medieval Seljuk State established a few years after the Battle of Manzikert by Suleyman I of Rum, a descendant of the Central Asian Turkoman Seljuk. This state fought major wars against the Byzantine Empire, Crusaders and rival Muslim States, due to its changing defensive and expansionist policies. It was also vassalized at some points in history by the Byzantine Empire, Seljuk Empire, Danishmendids as well as the Mongol Empire and the Ilkhanate, before dissolving into multiple Anatolian Beyliks with loss of authority.

Here is a list of conflicts involving the Seljuk Sultanate of Rum, derived from various Turkish and English sources.

Seljuk victory

Seljuk defeat

Another result

| Conflict | Rum and allies | Opponent(s) | Results | | | | |
|---|---|---|---|---|---|---|---|
| Conflict | Rum and allies | Opponent(s) | Results | Malik-Shah's Anatolian Campaign (1078) | Sultanate of Rum: Suleiman ibn Qutalmish (Note: Side of Suleiman ibn Qutalmish is disputed amongst historians.); Turkoman tribesmen. Seljuk Empire: Malik-Shah I; Emir Porsuk. | Sultanate of Rum: Suleiman ibn Qutalmish (Note: Side of Suleiman ibn Qutalmish is disputed amongst historians.); Emir Mansur: Mansur's Loyalists.; Turkoman mercenaries. Byzantine Empire: Nikephoros III Botaneiates | Other results: Fierce battles take place between Kutalmışoğul Emir Mansur and Emir Porsuk.; Death of Emir Mansur.; Suppression of his independence activities.; Rise and conquests of Suleiman ibn Qutalmish.; Historians suggest that the campaign was to eliminate both the sons of Kutalmış, but only the fate of Emir Mansur could be sealed. |
| Initial conquests of Byzantine lands: Conquest of Nicaea and Nicomedia; Fall of Bithynia | Sultanate of Rum; Turkoman tribesmen. Byzantine pretenders Supported by:- Seljuk Empire; Abbasid Caliph | Byzantine Empire | Victory: Foundation of the Seljuk Sultanate of Rum in Anatolia.; Fall of Nicaea, Nicomedia and Bithynia.; Recognition by the Great Seljuks and the Abbasid Caliph. | | | | |
| Malik-Shah's Anatolian Campaign: Conquest of Konya, Aksaray and Kayseri.; Alleged siege of Constantinople. | Sultanate of Rum; Turkoman tribesmen. Seljuk Empire | Byzantine Empire | Victory As per Osman Turan: Fall of Konya, Aksaray and Kayseri and other major Anatolian towns.; A tax of 1,000,000 gold coins imposed on the Byzantine Empire.; Malik-Shah I cedes the conquered territories to Suleiman Shah. | | | | |
| Power struggles in the Byzantine Empire: Bryennios' March on Constantinople; Botaneiates' seizure of power | Opposition to the Byzantine Emperor: Nikephoros III Botaneiates; Theodore Gabras; Philaretos Brachamios; Nikephoros Bryennios the Elder; Constantine Doukas; Nikephoros Basilakes; Military Support: Sultanate of Rum; Turkoman tribesmen. | Byzantine Empire: Michael VII Doukas; Initial Support: Sultanate of Rum; Turkoman tribesmen. | Victory: Nikephoros III Botaneiates seizes the throne.; As per deals, the borders of the sultanate extend up to the shores of Marmara, Aegean, Mediterranean and the Black Sea. | | | | |
| Rebellion of Nikephoros Bryennios and Basilakes | Imperial forces; Nikephoros III Botaneiates; Alexios I Komnenos; Constantine Katakalon; Military Support: Sultanate of Rum; Chomatenoi and Frankish mercenaries. | Rebel forces; Nikephoros Bryennios the Elder; John Bryennios; Katakalon Tarchaneiotes; Pecheneg Allies; Nikephoros Basilakes | Victory: Nikephoros Basilakes is ambushed and defeated at Varda River.; Nikephoros Bryennios is defeated at the Battle of Kalavrye.; Revolt suppressed. Turks are given a share in the spoils. | | | | |
| Rebellion of Alexios Komnenos (1081) | Rebel forces; Alexios I Komnenos; Maria of Alania; Nikephoros Melissenos; Military Support: Sultanate of Rum; Turkoman mercenaries. | Imperial forces; Nikephoros III Botaneiates | Victory: Alexios I Komnenos becomes emperor.; Nikephoros Melissenos is given the title of Caesar.; Byzantium agrees to pay an annual tribute to the Seljuk Sultanate of Rum. | | | | |
| Norman invasion of the Byzantine Empire (1081) | Byzantine Empire Military Support: Sultanate of Rum | Norman Invaders Supported by: Tzachas and Pechenegs | Seljuk Profit: Sultanate of Rum assists Alexios I Komnenos in his defensive campaigns.; Süleyman agrees to bring Rum under nominal Byzantine vassalage.; Alexios I Komnenos recognizes the borders of Rum up to the Drakon River.; 1081 Peace Treaty concluded. (Note: See attached references) | | | | |
| Conquest of Tarsus (1083) | Sultanate of Rum | Byzantine Empire | Victory: Fall of Tarsus, Adana, Anazarba, Masisa and other major Cilician towns. | | | | |
| Siege of Antioch (1084–1085) | Sultanate of Rum; Turkoman tribesmen. Supported by:- Seljuk Empire | Byzantine Empire: Dominions of Philaretos Brachamios | Victory: Fall of Antioch, as well as the districts of Harim and Duluk of Aleppo. | | | | |
| Battle for Antioch (June 1085) | Sultanate of Rum; Turkoman tribesmen. Çubuk Principality | Uqaylid Emirate; Turkoman mercenaries. Çubuk Principality | Victory: Suleiman ibn Qutalmish becomes the victor of the battle.; Death of Muslim ibn Quraysh. | | | | |
| Siege of Aleppo (1086) | Sultanate of Rum; Turkoman tribesmen. | Emirate of Aleppo: Hassan ibn Hibat Allah Al-Hutayti | Defeat: Siege lifted. | | | | |
| Conquest of Uqaylid lands (1086) | Sultanate of Rum | Uqaylid Emirate | Victory: Fall of Ma'arra, Kafartab, Shayzar and Qinnasrin.; Suleyman Shah marries Menia Hatun, the widowed wife of Sharaf al-Dawla Muslim. | | | | |
| Battle of Ain Salm (1086) | Sultanate of Rum; Çubuk Principality | Seljuks of Syria and Palestine; Artuklu Principality; Çubuk Principality | Defeat: Death of Suleiman ibn Qutalmish.; Brief occupation of the Sultanate of Rum by the Tzachas, Elchanes and Poulchanes.; Imprisonment of Kilij Arslan I by Malik-Shah I.; Loss of Antioch to the Seljuk Empire. | | | | |
| Byzantium's Siege of Nicaea (1090) | Sultanate of Rum | Byzantine Empire | Victory: Siege lifted due to Emir Porsuk's campaign. | | | | |
| Abu'l-Qasim's Naval Campaigns | Sultanate of Rum Supported by: Tzachas and Pechenegs | Byzantine Empire | Defeat: Destruction of Abu'l-Qasim's fleet.; Land army of Tatikios defeats Abu'l-Qasim's army.; Loss of Nicomedia.; Truce favourable to Byzantium concluded. | | | | |
| Malik-Shah's Anatolian Campaign (1088) | Sultanate of Rum Byzantine Empire | Seljuk Empire | Victory: Siege lifted.; Withdrawal of Emir Porsuk. | | | | |
| Emir Bozan's Anatolian Campaign (1090-1091) | Sultanate of Rum Byzantine Empire | Seljuk Empire | Overall Defeat: Siege lifted by Emir Bozan due to fierce resistance by Abu'l-Qasim.; Abu'l-Qasim assassinated in a plot by Emir Bozan.; Large swaths of Anatolia come under the Great Seljuk Empire. | | | | |
| Byzantine-Seljuk Conflict (1092): Siege of Nicaea; Fall of Kapıdağ and Uluabat regions to Rum.; Battles at Land and Sea. | Sultanate of Rum; Turkoman mercenaries. | Byzantine Empire | Draw: Kilij Arslan I forces Alexios I Komnenos to lift the siege of Nicaea.; Ilhan Muhammed launched a fierce attack at the entrance to the lake and routed the Byzantines.; Land army of Alexios defeats and captures Ilhan Muhammed.; Both sides make peace due to heavy losses. | | | | |
| Campaigns of Chaka Bey (1088-1093): Initial conquests. (Note: Phocaea and the eastern Aegean islands of Lesbos (except for the fortress of Methymna), Samos, Chios and Rhodes.); Battle of the Oinousses Islands (1090); Campaigns of Constantine Dalassenos (1091-92); Siege of Abydos and Death.; Fall of Smyrna. | Tzachas; Pecheneg Turks Byzantine rebels: Rhapsomates; Karykes; Supported by:- Sultanate of Rum; Turkoman mercenaries. | Byzantine Empire Supported by:- Sultanate of Rum | Other result: Chaka Bey was initially supported by Rum, then governed by Abu'l-Qasim, and also in the beginning of Kilij Arslan's reign through a marriage alliance.; Alexios I Komnenos incited Kilij Arslan against Chaka Bey which led to the Bey's assassination.; Seljuks and Byzantines surround Smyrna by land & sea, leading to its fall.; Although Kilij Arslan succeed in his motive, it led to a Seljuk loss by weakening the struggle against Byzantium. | | | | |
| People's Crusade (1096): Siege of Xerigordos; Battle of Civetot | Sultanate of Rum Defensive only:- Jews of France and Hungary. | People's Crusade Supported by:- Papal States; Byzantine Empire | Victory: Kilij Arslan breaks the Siege of Xerigordos and brutally punishes the crusaders.; Kilij Arslan and army annihilate over 60,000 crusaders at Civetot. | | | | |
| Siege of Malatya (1096) | Sultanate of Rum | Byzantine Empire: Dominion of Gabriel of Melitene; Danishmendids | Defeat: Kilij Arslan attacked Malatya to capture it before the Danishmendids.; Kilij Arslan fails to capture Malatya due to the fierce resistance of Gabriel of Melitene.; According to some sources, Kilij Arslan also tended to invade the Danishmendids in Anatolia, which led to a battle that concluded with peace due to the First Crusade. | | | | |
| First Crusade: Siege of Nicaea; Battle of Dorylaeum (1097) | Anatolia:- Sultanate of Rum; Danishmendids Levant:-: Seljuk Empire; Antakya Governate; Mosul Atabegate; Emirate of Damascus; Emirate of Aleppo; Emirate of Homs; Fatimid Caliphate | Crusader armies: Army of Raymond of Saint-Gilles; Army of Godfrey of Bouillon; Army of Hugh of Vermandois; Army of Stephen of Blois; Army of Robert II of Flanders; Army of Robert Curthose; Peasants of Peter the Hermit; Armies of Bohemond of Taranto; Army of the Byzantine Empire; Countries:- Kingdom of France: County of Toulouse; Diocese of Le Puy-en-Velay; Duchy of Lower Lorraine; County of Boulogne; County of Vermandois; County of Blois; Duchy of Normandy; County of Flanders; Holy Roman Empire; Byzantine Empire; Norman Kingdom of Sicily Supported by:- Papal States | Defeat: Large swaths of Anatolia, including Nicaea, fall to the Byzantine Empire.; Sack of Nicaea, Iconium and Kayseri. Capital shifted to Konya.; Kilij Arslan and allies are defeated at the Battle of Dorylaeum.; The Crusaders successfully capture Jerusalem and establish the Crusader states. | | | | |
| Battle with Sweyn the Crusader (1097) | Sultanate of Rum Supported by:- Danishmendids; Turkoman mercenaries. | Army of Sweyn the Crusader Supported by:- Crusader armies: Army of Raymond of Saint-Gilles; Army of Godfrey of Bouillon; Army of Hugh of Vermandois; Army of Stephen of Blois; Army of Robert II of Flanders; Army of Robert Curthose; Peasants of Peter the Hermit; Armies of Bohemond of Taranto | Victory: Death of Sweyn the Crusader.; Destruction of his army on way to Jerusalem. | | | | |
| Siege of Malatya (1100): Battle of Melitene | Danishmendids Supported by:- Sultanate of Rum | Byzantine Empire: Dominion of Gabriel of Melitene; Principality of Antioch | Victory: Although Malatya couldn't fall, Gazi Gümüshtigin ambushed and captured Bohemond I of Antioch.; It is questioned whether Kilij Arslan supported him or not, as he himself wanted Malatya. | | | | |
| Crusade of 1101: Fall of Ankara.; Attacks on Gangra & Kastamonu.; Battle of Mersivan.; Battles of Heraclea. | Anatolia:- Sultanate of Rum; Danishmendids Levant:-: Seljuk Empire; Emirate of Aleppo; Fatimid Caliphate | Kingdom of France: Duchy of Burgundy; County of Nevers; County of Vermandois; County of Blois; Montlhéry; County of Toulouse; Duchy of Aquitaine; County of Burgundy Holy Roman Empire: Palatine County of Burgundy; Duchy of Bavaria; Margraviate of Austria; County of Roussillon; Republic of Genoa; Byzantine Empire Papal States: Papacy; Milan | Victory: Kilij Arslan and allies defeat the crusaders at the Battle of Mersivan.; Kilij Arslan and army subsequently rout the crusaders at the Battles of Heraclea.; Fatimids defeat the crusaders at the Battle of Ramla (1102) and besiege the city of Jaffa. | | | | |
| Campaign to Antioch (1103) | Sultanate of Rum; Danishmendids | Principality of Antioch | Campaign abandoned: Kilij Arslan turns eastward due to Gazi Gümüshtigin's campaign in Malatya. | | | | |
| Siege of Dyrrhachium (1107–1108) | Byzantine Empire: Alexios I Komnenos; Alexios Komnenos; Supported by:- Sultanate of Rum: Seljuk mercenaries. | Principality of Antioch: Bohemond I of Antioch; Army of Bohemond and loyalists.; Norman Kingdom of Sicily: Norman mercenaries. | Victory: Siege lifted.; Treaty of Devol. | | | | |
| Kilij Arslan's Eastern Campaigns: Battle of Marash (1103); Siege of Malatya (1005); Siege of Urfa (1106); Fall of Harran; Battle of Mosul (1107) | Sultanate of Rum: Kilij Arslan; Arslan's loyalists.; Seljuk Commanders & Army.; Turkoman mercenaries.; Supported by:- Seljuk defectors.: Beylik of Mayyāfāriqīn; Ziyaeddin Mehmed; Humar-taş; Mosul Atabegate; Chökürmish; Oğuzoğlu; Zengi (Note: Not to be confused with Imad al-Din Zengi.); Abu Muhammed Abdullah bin Kasım; Abu'l-Berekat Muhammed bin Muhammed; Beylik of Çubukoğulları; Mehmet Bey ibn Çubuk; Beylik of Diyarbakır; İbrahim ibn Yinal (Note: Not to be confused with Ibrahim Inal.); Defensive only:- Artuqids of Mardin: Ulugh-salar | (1103-06):- Danishmendid Beylik: Gazi Gümüshtigin #; Sungur (Note: Son of Gazi Gümüshtigin, also called Yağı-sıyan) (surrendered); Danishmendid commanders.; (1106-07):- Seljuk Empire: Seljuk Sultanate; Muhammad I Tapar; Mosul Atabegate; Emir Çavlı; Saltuklu Principality; Ahlatşahlar Beyliği; Sökmen el-Kutbî #; County of Edessa; Baldwin II; Defenders of Edessa | Victory: Submission of Malatya, Mayyāfāriqīn, Elbistan, Mosul, Harput and Diyarbekir.; Many Eastern Anatolian beyliks submit to Kilij Arslan.; Kilij Arslan installs his loyalists as governers of these cities.; Despite success, campaigns conducted on crusaders of Antioch and Edessa failed. | | | | |
| Battle of the Khabur River (1107) | Sultanate of Rum: Kilij Arslan #; Arslan's loyalists.; Seljuk Commanders & Army.; Emir Bozmış; Şahin Şah (POW); Mesud (POW); Turkoman mercenaries.; Supported by:- Seljuk Allies.: Beylik of Mayyāfāriqīn; Ziyaeddin Mehmed; Humar-taş; Mosul Atabegate; Chökürmish; Oğuzoğlu; Zengi (Note: Not to be confused with Imad al-Din Zengi.); Beylik of Çubukoğulları; Mehmet Bey ibn Çubuk; Beylik of Diyarbakır; İbrahim ibn Yinal (Note: Not to be confused with Ibrahim Inal.); Other Seljuk Principalities and Overlords.; Byzantine mercenaries | Seljuk Empire: Seljuk Sultanate; Muhammad I Tapar; Mosul Atabegate; Emir Çavlı; Çavlı's loyalists.; Artuqid Principality; Ilghazi; Emirate of Aleppo; Ridwan; Defectors from Kilij Arslan's Army. | Defeat: Death of Kilij Arslan I.; Loss of occupied territories to Muhammad I Tapar and allies. | | | | |
| Byzantine-Seljuk Conflict (1113-1116): Siege of Nicaea (1113); Battle of Philomelion (1116) | Sultanate of Rum: Şâhin Şah; Şâhin Şah's loyalists.; Seljuk commanders and army.; Turkoman raiders. | Byzantine Empire: Alexios I Komnenos; Byzantine commanders.; Nikephoros Bryennios the Younger | Defeat: Seljuks fail to take Nicaea.; Seljuks are defeated in the Battle of Philomelion (1116).; A few border cities, including Akşehir, fall to the Byzantines.; As per Anna Komnene, Şâhin Şah agrees to make Rum a Byzantine vassal. | | | | |
| 1107-16 Succession Conflict | Combatants separated by lines: Government of Konya: Şâhin Şah (executed); Şâhin Şah's loyalists.; Imperial commanders and army.; Government of Malatya: Melik Tuğrul Arslan; Arslan's loyalists.; Emir Bozmış (executed); İlarslan; Ayşe Hatun; Turkoman soldiers.; Mesud and allies: Hasan Gazi of Kayseri (executed); Rükneddin Mesud; Turkoman mercenaries; Melik Arapşah; Turkoman soldiers from Ankara; Supported by:- Danishmendid Beylik: Emir Melikgazi; Danishmendid mercenaries. | | Mesud's Victory: Mesud I seizes power in Konya.; Şâhin Şah is captured at Tyragion. He is blinded and subsequently executed by the order of the Sultan.; The Danishmendids increase their influence in Rum with the support of Mesud.; Agreements made with Byzantium during Şâhin Şah's reign are anulled. | | | | |
| Byzantine-Seljuk Conflict (1119-20): Siege of Laodicea (1119); Siege of Sozopolis (1120) | Sultanate of Rum | Byzantine Empire | Defeat: John II Komnenos and army annihilate majority of the Seljuk army defending Sozopolis.; Fall of Laodicea, Sozopolis, Hierakokoryphitis and many other towns and fortifications near Attaleia to the Byzantine Empire.; Land connection with Attaleia, Cilicia and Crusader states re-established. | | | | |
| Siege of Malatya (1124) | Danishmendids Supported by:- Sultanate of Rum | Seljuk Government of Malatya; Melik Tuğrul Arslan; Ayşe Hatun; Supported by:— Artuqids of Harput and Aleppo; Melik Arab | Victory: Fall of Malatya to Melik Mehmed Gazi after a 7-month siege.; Melik Tuğrul Arslan and Ayşe Hatun flee to Minşar.; Fall of Minşar on 10 December 1124. | | | | |
| Rebellion of Melik Arab (1126): Siege of Iconium (1126) | Sultanate of Rum Supported by:- Danishmendids; Byzantine Empire | Melik Arab (surrendered); Armenian Kingdom of Cilicia | Victory: Capitulation of Melik Arab and his loyalists.; Fall of Ankara, Kastamonu and Çankırı to Mesud I and allies. | | | | |
| John Komnenos' Anatolian Campaigns (1130-40): Conflict with Issac (1130-38); Fall & Recapture of Kastamonu and Çankırı (Note: Kastamonu and Çankırı changed hands twice.); Siege of Niksar (1140). | 1130-35: Danishmendids; Isaac Komnenos and Conspirators Allies of Issac: Sultanate of Rum; Gabrades' Regime in Trebizond; Cilicia; Kingdom of Jerusalem | 1130-35: Byzantine Empire Sultanate of Rum | Inconclusive: Rükneddin Mesud initially sides with John II Komnenos, supporting him in his campaigns.; Melik Mehmed Gazi compels Rükneddin Mesud to withdraw from Çankırı.; Isaac Komnenos reconciles with John II Komnenos, ignoring his state allies and the desire for the throne.; Turks were able to counterattack and raid successfully into Byzantine territory, threatening the fortresses of Zinin and Sozopolis.; Kastamonu and Çankırı change hands twice, ending up with the Danishmendids. | | | | |
| John Komnenos' Anatolian Campaigns (1130-40): Conflict with Issac (1130-38); Fall & Recapture of Kastamonu and Çankırı; Siege of Niksar (1140). | 1137-42: Danishmendids Sultanate of Rum Defensive only:- Gabrades' Regime in Trebizond (surrendered) | 1137-42: Byzantine Empire | Victory: John II Komnenos withdraws from Niksar.·; Rükneddin Mesud attacks Byzantine territories during John II Komnenos' Syrian campaign.; Turkish raiders advance as far as the Antalya region in 1142.; Danishmendid forces simultaneously invaded Bithynia, Cilicia, Kapniskerti and Vakha.; John was back in Anatolia, but a pyrrhic victory against Mehmed in February 1140 meant the emperor had to again return to Constantinople in order to rebuild his army.; Fall of Trebizond to John II Komnenos. | | | | |
| Danishmendid Civil War (1142-50) | Combatants separated by lines: Government of Sivas: Nizam al-Din Yağıbasan (surrendered); Yağıbasan's loyalists. (surrendered); Turkoman mercenaries from Sivas; Supported by:- Byzantine Empire: Manuel I Komnenos; Government of Malatya and Elbistan: Aynüddevle Gazi; Aynüddevle's loyalists.; Garrison of Malatya.; Turkoman mercenaries from Malatya and Elbistan; Government of Kayseri: Melik Zünnun; Zünnun's loyalists.; Turkoman mercenaries from Kayseri; Supported by:- Sultanate of Rum: Rükneddin Mesud; Seljuk commanders and army. | | Seljuk Victory: Melik Zünnun initially ascends the throne, but is deposed by Yağıbasan.; Aynüddevle Gazi and Nasreddin march to Kayseri, but turn to Malatya and Elbistan.; Melik Zünnun seeks refuge with Rükneddin Mesud.; Rükneddin Mesud defeats Yağıbasan and seizes Sivas, Yukarı Seyhan, Adana and Elbistan, bringing them under Seljuk vassalage.; Aynüddevle Gazi accepts Seljuk vassalage, despite Mesud's failure in Malatya.; Kastamonu and Çankırı come under Seljuk suzerainty.; The Sultanate of Rum becomes the major power in Anatolia. | | | | |
| Manuel's Expedition to Ikonion (1146): Battle at Akroinοn; Fall of Akşehir; Capture of Prakana Fortress; Frequent Seljuk Raids; Unsuccessful Siege (1146) | Sultanate of Rum | Byzantine Empire | Victory: Status quo ante bellum; Siege lifted by Byzantine forces.; Manuel I Komnenos makes peace with Rükneddin Mesud.; Seljuk raiders ambushed the Byzantines and inflicted heavy losses, killing as many as 20,000 men, including commander Kritopolos. | | | | |
| Second Crusade (1147–1150): Battle of Dorylaeum (1147); Battle of Laodicea (1147); Battle of Ephesus (1147); Battle of the Meander (1147); Battle of Mount Cadmus (1148) | Anatolia:-: Sultanate of Rum; Danishmendid vassals.; Levant:-: Zengid State; Emirate of Aleppo; Emirate of Mosul; Seljuk Empire; Emirate of Damascus; Fatimid Caliphate Iberia:- Almoravid State (surrendered) Balkans:- Byzantine Empire Supported by:- Abbasid Caliphate | Crusader States: Kingdom of Jerusalem: Council of Acre; Seljuk Turncoats; County of Tripoli; Principality of Antioch; County of Edessa Europe:- Kingdom of France: King of France; Duchy of Aquitaine; County of Nevers; County of Flanders; County of Bar; County of Auvergne; County of Toulouse; Holy Roman Empire: King of the Romans; Army; County of Savoy; Faucigny; Seyssel; La Chambre; Miolans; Montbel; Thoire; Montmayeur; Vienne; Viry; La Palude; Blonay; Chevron-Villette; Chignin; Châtillon; March of Montferrat; Duchy of Swabia; Otto of Freising; Duchy of Austria; Duchy of Bavaria; Kingdom of Bohemia; March of Styria; Normans: Kingdom of Sicily; Kingdom of Africa; Kingdom of England Republic of Genoa Republic of Pisa Iberia:- (Note: Within Europe Only); County of Barcelona Emperor of All Spain: Kingdom of León; Kingdom of Castile; Kingdom of Galicia; County of Urgell Kingdom of Portugal Non-State:- Knights Templar Supported by:- Papal States | Victory: Seljuk forces annihilate 63-90% of the German army at Dorylaeum.; Seljuk forces conduct raids on the French Crusaders at Laodicea, Ephesus and Meander; Seljuk forces dealt a decisive blow to the French Crusaders at Mount Cadmus.; Crusaders fail to seize Damascus. | | | | |
| Artuqid Civil War (1144) | Artuqids of Hasankeyf; Kara Arslan and loyalists; Supported by:- Sultanate of Rum | Artuqids of Hasankeyf; Arslan Dogmush and loyalists; Supported by:- Zengid State | Kara Arslan's Victory: Kara Arslan defeated his brother Arslan Dogmush with the support of 20,000 horsemen from Mesud I. | | | | |
| Fall of the County of Edessa (1148—1151) | Sultanate of Rum: Artuqids; Artuqids of Hasankeyf; Artuqids of Mardin; Zengid State At Inab:- Emirate of Damascus | County of Edessa; Kingdom of Jerusalem; Byzantine Empire At Inab:- Principality of Antioch; Order of Assassins | Muslim Victory: Crusaders were routed in the Battle of Inab on June 29, 1149.; Fall of Marash to Mesud I and Babhula to Kara Arslan.; Truce concluded with Joscelin II after Mesud's first siege of Turbessel.; Capture and imprisonment of Joscelin II after an ambush by Nur al-Din Zengi, as retaliation to a previous defeat.; Fall of Kishum, Bayt al-Hosn, Ra'ban, Farzman, Keysun and Behisni to Mesud by May 30, 1150.; Second siege of Turbessel lifted due to Baldwin's intervention.; Transfer of the county's lands to the Byzantine Empire.; Fall of Raban, Dülük and Bayt al-Hosn to Mesud I; Ravendan, Kurus and Burjur-Rasas to Nur al-Din Zengi; and Samosata and Birecik to the Artuqid Timurtash.; Fall of Turbessel to Nur al-Din Zengi in 1151. | | | | |
| Cilician Campaigns of Mesud (1152—1154) | Sultanate of Rum; Byzantine Empire | Armenian Kingdom of Cilicia; Knights Templar | Defeat | | | | |
| Kilij Arslan's wars of succession (1155—1157) | Sultanate of Rum: Kilij Arslan; Arslan's loyalists; Supported by:- Kingdom of Jerusalem; Principality of Antioch; Armenian Kingdom of Cilicia; Zengid pretenders | Anti-Seljuk Alliance:-; Seljuk Opposition; Devlet (executed); Şâhin Şah; Danishmendids; Yağıbasan; Melik Zünnun; Byzantine Empire; Zengid State; Armenian Kingdom of Cilicia | Victory: Kilij Arslan recovers Aintab, Ra'ban, Maraş and Goksun from the Zengids and the Armenian Kingdom of Cilicia.; Pertus fortress surrendered to Rum by Cilicia.; Danishmendids submit to Kilij Arslan.; Unilateral ceasefire ensured with Nur al-Din Zengi. | | | | |
| Byzantine-Seljuk War (1158-1162) | Sultanate of Rum; Yağıbasan; Turkoman mercenaries | Byzantine Empire Allies:-: Seljuk Opposition; Şâhin Şah; Danishmendids; Yağıbasan; Melik Zünnun; Zulkarnayn | Nominal Submission to Byzantium | | | | |
| Seljuk-Danishmendid War (1162-1173) | Sultanate of Rum: Artuqids; Artuqids of Hasankeyf; Artuqids of Mardin; Beylik of Dilmaç; Zengid pretenders Nasreddin Muhammad | Seljuk Opposition; Şâhin Şah; Danishmendids; Yağıbasan #; Melik Zünnun; Zulkarnayn #; Fahreddin Qasim; Efridun; Zengid State | Victory | | | | |
| Seljuk-Zengid War (1172-1173) | Sultanate of Rum | Zengid state Allies:- Artuqids of Harput; Artuqids of Mardin; Şâhin Şah; Göksun Bey Gök Arslan; Melik Zünnun; Efridun; Melik İsmail X Armenian Kingdom of Cilicia | Peace | | | | |
| 1174 Seljuk Campaigns in Anatolia | Sultanate of Rum | Danishmendids of Sivas (surrendered); Mengüjekids | Victory | | | | |
| Battle of Myriokephalon; Events: Sack of Laodicea (Note: Turkoman raiders also appeared in the cities of the Phrygian Pentapolis. The Turkomans invaded and sacked Laodikeia, slayed its bishop, Solomon, and killed or captured much of its population and livestock.); Surrender of Turkoman settlements to Kilij Arslan II. (Note: Kilij Arslan II sent envoys to the emperor and offered to comply with his demands, and even to help the Byzantine forces garrison a number of Turkoman-controlled cities Manuel desired. The emperor appointed Alexios Petraliphas to lead 6,000 men and occupy these settlements. However when the imperial army approached, the sultan warned the cities of the approaching Byzantines, forced them to surrender to him instead, and then refused to hand them over to Manuel I.); Defeat of Şâhin Şah and Michael Gabras at Amasya (Note: the city of Amaseia, formerly held by Şâhin Şah, was about to surrender itself to imperial control. For this reason, the emperor dispatched the Sebastos Michael Gabras to Paphlagonia with a small force, and ordered him to recruit soldiers from Trebizond and Oinaion, and then march towards the city. When the general reached Amaseia, the people inside invited him in, but since a Seljuk army was also encamped nearby, Michael hesitated and suspected the citizens of treachery. The citizens of Amaseia gave the Byzantines hostages and offered them the city's citadel, but Michael was still suspicious. As the citizens began to worry about imperial inactivity and possible Turkoman reprisals, they surrendered the city to the Seljuks, and Michael withdrew while abandoning the soldiers inside the citadel.); Rebuilding of Dorylaeum and Choma; Turkoman defeats near Dorylaeum | Sultanate of Rum | Byzantine Empire; Kingdom of Hungary; Principality of Antioch; Grand Principality of Serbia | Victory | | | | |
| Byzantine–Seljuk war (1175–1179): Battle of Hyelion and Leimocheir; Siege of Claudiopolis | Sultanate of Rum | Byzantine Empire; Kingdom of Hungary; Principality of Antioch; Grand Principality of Serbia | Defeat | | | | |

== Wars involving the Kerman Seljuk Sultanate (1041–1187) ==
The Kerman Seljuk Sultanate was established in the aftermath of the Conquest of Kerman by Qavurt, the son of Chaghri Bey. Its major conflicts include rebellions against the Great Seljuk Sultans, defensive operations against local chiefs as well as internal conflicts. It dissolved after the invasion of the Ghuzz Turks under Malik Dinar in 1187.

Here is a list of conflicts involving the Kerman Seljuk Sultanate.

Kerman victory

Kerman defeat

Another result

| Conflict | Kerman and allies | Opponent(s) | Results |
|---|---|---|---|
| Battle of Rey (1059) | Seljuk Empire; Kerman Seljuk Sultanate | Rebels under Ibrahim Inal | Victory: Rebellion Suppressed.; Tughril I regains power in Rey.; Imprisonment of Ibrahim Inal and nephews. |
| Conquest of Kerman (1041-51) | Seljuk Empire | Buyid Dynasty; Qufs of Germsir | Victory: Fall of Kerman and Makran.; Bahram b. Lashkaristan surrenders Bardasir to Qavurt.; Subjugation of the Qufs.; Establishment of the Kerman Seljuk Sultanate.; Submission of Badr Isa, the emir of Hormuz. |
| First War with the Shabankara (1062) | Kerman Seljuk Sultanate | Shabankara Tribe | Victory: Qavurt captures Shiraz, while Fadluya flees to Jahrom.; Fadluya fails to retake Shiraz following a battle against Qavurt. |
| Second War with the Shabankara (1064) | Kerman Seljuk Sultanate | Seljuk Empire; Shabankara Tribe | Defeat: Loss of territories in Fars due to Alp Arslan's intervention.; Defeat of Qavurt's forces in battle with Alp Arslan's vanguard. |
| Qavurt's First Rebellion (1067) | Kerman Seljuk Sultanate | Seljuk Empire | Defeat: Qavurt's forces are defeated by Alp Arslan's forces.; Alp Arslan forgives Qavurt and lifts the siege of Jiroft. |
| Qavurt's Second Rebellion (1068-69) | Kerman Seljuk Sultanate; Shabankara Tribe | Seljuk Empire | Draw: Defeat and imprisonment of Fadluya and his son, with occupation of his territories by Nizam al-Mulk.; Alp Arslan lifts the siege of Bardasir, before handing it over to his son Malik-Shah I.; Qavurt refuses to handover his son Sultan Shah, who is considered a main cause for the rebellion.; Alp Arslan withdraws from Kerman, before confiscating a certain portion of the territories that were under Qavurt's sovereignty. |
| Qavurt's Conquest of Oman | Kerman Seljuk Sultanate | Buyid Oman; Nasrid dynasty; Balūchi brigands | Partial Victory: In an expedition against Oman, Qavurt deposed the Büyid governor and brought Oman under Seljuk suzerainty, with ships chartered from Badr Isa, the emir of Hurmuz.; Amirān-Shah fails to intercept the Balūchi brigands in Sistan. |
| Battle of Kerj Abu Dulaf | Kerman Seljuk Sultanate | Seljuk Empire | Defeat: Execution of Qavurt and blinding of his two sons.; Malik-Shah appointed Qutlugh-Tegin as the governor of Fars and Sav-Tegin as the governor of Kerman, although the sons of Qavurt hold actual power. |
| Malik Shah's Campaign in Kerman (1074) | Kerman Seljuk Sultanate | Seljuk Empire | Peace: Malik-Shah I returns to Isfahan after Sultan-Shah begged for forgiveness only demolishing one of the bastions of Kuhan. |
| Turan Shah's Campaigns in Fars | Kerman Seljuk Sultanate | Seljuk Empire | Victory: Defeat of Turan Shah in his first campaign against Emir ed-Devle Humâr Tegin, governor of Fars.; Victory and reconquest of Fars in his second campaign. |
| 1093-1095 Seljuk Civil War | Berkyaruq-led faction Commanders: Berkyaruq ibn Malik Shah; Gumushtigin; Bori Bars ibn Alp Arslan; Ahmad Sanjar; Nizamiyya mamluks Defensive only: Kerman Seljuk Sultanate; Shabankara tribe | Terken-led faction Commanders: Mahmud I; Terken Khatun; Taj al-Mulk (executed); Emir Unar; Ismail ibn Yaquti; Seljuk Emirate of Damascus Rebels under Arghun Arslan | Victory: Terken Khatun's campaign against Turan Shah I and the Shabankara, led by Emir Unar (1064), fails due to local support. |
| First Anti-Seljuk Rebellion in Oman (Note: During Turan Shah I's reign) | Kerman Seljuk Sultanate | Rebels in Oman | Victory: Rebellion suppressed. |
| Emir Unar's Campaign in Fars (1098-99) | Kerman Seljuk Sultanate; Shabankara tribe | Seljuk Empire | Victory: Emir Unar repelled from Fars by Iranshah and the Shabankara. |
| Çolak Bëzdar Rebellion | Kerman Seljuk Sultanate | Çolak Bëzdar and the people of Kerman | Çolak Bëzdar's Victory: People successfully overthrow Iranshah.; Murder of Iranshah in 1101 CE. |
| Second Anti-Seljuk Rebellion in Oman (Note: During Arslan Shah I's reign) | Kerman Seljuk Sultanate | Rebels in Oman (under Emir Abu Sa'd Muhammad) | Victory: Rebellion suppressed, although the tribes in the interior began to gain a degree of independence. |
| Jawali's Campaigns in Fars | Domains of Emir Baldaji (surrendered); Shabankara tribe Domains of Abu Sa'd Muhammad bin Mamma (surrendered); Domains of Ibrahim of Dar Abjard; Kerman Seljuk Sultanate | Jawali Saqawa's domains | Victory |

== Wars involving the Emirate of Aleppo (1086–1118) ==
In 1086, the city of Aleppo was besieged by Suleiman ibn Qutalmish, the Seljuk Sultan of Rum, during his campaigns in Syria. Hassan ibn Hibat Allah Al-Hutayti, the Chief of Aleppo, requested help from Tutush I, the Emir of Damascus, promising to surrender the city to him. Thereupon Tutush marched on Suleiman, and defeated him at the Battle of Ain Salm.

However, Hassan did not fulfill his promise to hand over the city. Hence, Tutush marched on Hassan, subsequently besieging and occupying Aleppo in May 1086. Thereafter, he declared himself the Sultan of Aleppo and Damascus.

This led to the foundation of the Seljuk Emirate of Aleppo. The Emirate dissolved when Sultan Shah, the grandson of Tutush handed over the city to the Artukid emir Ilghazi. This was followed by an unsuccessful siege, thereby completely ending the Seljuk domain in Aleppo.

Here is a list of conflicts involving the Emirate of Aleppo.

Aleppine victory

Aleppine defeat

Another result

| Conflict | Aleppo and allies | Opponent(s) | Results | | | | |
|---|---|---|---|---|---|---|---|
| Conflict | Aleppo and allies | Opponent(s) | Results | Siege of Aleppo (1086) | Seljuk Emirate of Damascus Supported by:- Great Seljuk Empire: Artuqid Beylik; Beylik of Çubukoğulları | Uqaylid Emirate of Aleppo | Victory: Fall of Aleppo on March 1086.; Tutush I proclaims the title of Sultan of Aleppo and Damascus.; Foundation of the Seljuk Emirate of Aleppo. |

== Wars involving the Emirate of Damascus (1076–1104) ==
Here is a list of conflicts involving the Emirate of Damascus, derived from various Turkish and English sources.

Damascene victory

Damascene defeat

Another result

| Conflict | Damascus and allies | Opponent(s) | Results |
