= Battle of Ephesus (1147) =

Battle during the Second Crusade

- Part of the Second Crusade
Date	24 December 1147
Location	Ephesus, Byzantine Empire (modern-day Selçuk, İzmir, Turkey) 37.9411°N 27.3419°E
Result	Crusader victory

Belligerents
Kingdom of France	Sultanate of Rum

Commanders and leaders
Louis VII of France	Unknown

Casualties and losses
Unknown	Unknown

The Battle of Ephesus took place on 24 December 1147 during the Second Crusade. The French Crusader army, led by Louis VII of France, successfully fended off an ambush by the Seljuks of Rum outside Ephesus.

== Background ==
King Louis VII led the French army on the march across Europe and Asia Minor to Jerusalem. The army decided to march along the coast of Anatolia because the defeat of King Conrad of Germany and his army at Dorylaeum had made it clear that marching inland was too dangerous. In early December 1147 the army stopped to rest at Ephesus before continuing through the Meander Valley to reach the major port of Attalia.

Upon arrival at Ephesus, Louis was warned by messengers of Byzantine Emperor Manuel that the surrounding area was overrun by Seljuk Turks and that it would be wise for Louis to garrison his army in the imperial strongholds for the time being, especially considering that he could not rely on the local Greek population for intelligence or military help. Louis refused to listen to this advice and led his troops out of Ephesus at the end of the month.

== Battle ==
The Turks ambushed the Crusaders in the Decervium valley outside Ephesus as they were resting. Details of the battle are scarce, but according to witness Odo of Deuil, the courage of the Crusaders prevented the Turks from achieving success. Odo also claimed that the Muslim force was led by Greeks.

== Aftermath ==
The battle of Ephesus was a minor battle of the Second Crusade. William of Tyre, who says that the army rested at Ephesus, does not even mention that there was a battle there. The Turks continued to attack and were able to inflict a devastating defeat on the Crusader army at Mount Cadmus in January 1148.
