= Battle of the Meander =

Battle in 1147 on the Second Crusade

- Part of the Second Crusade
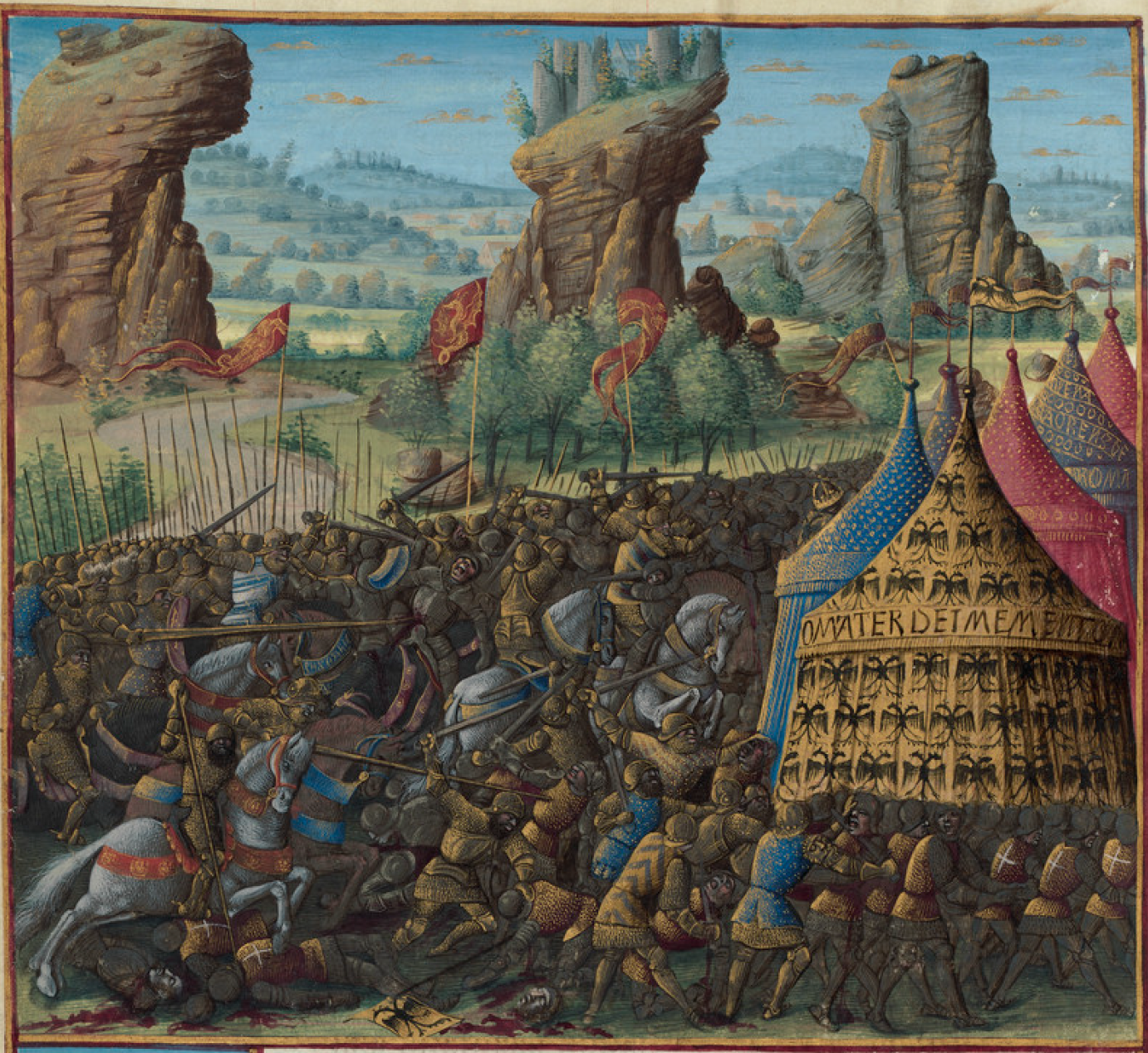
- From a copy of the Passages d'outremer (c. 1490)
| Date | Late December 1147 |
| Location | Büyük Menderes River, Byzantine Empire (modern-day Turkey) |
| Result | Crusader victory |

Belligerents
| Crusaders | Sultanate of Rum |

Commanders and leaders
| Louis VII of France | Unknown |

Casualties and losses
| Light | Moderate |

The Battle of the Meander took place in December 1147 during the Second Crusade. The French Crusader army, led by Louis VII of France, successfully fended off an ambush by the Seljuks of Rum at the Meander River.

== Background ==
King Louis VII led the French army on the march across Europe and Asia Minor to Jerusalem. The army decided to march along the coast of Anatolia because the defeat of King Conrad of Germany and his army at Dorylaeum had made it clear that marching inland was too dangerous. In December 1147 the army was marching across the valley of the river Maeander to reach the major port of Attalia. Odo of Deuil, who participated in the march, makes it clear that the Maeander valley was treacherous. Its mountain crags and slopes allowed the Turks to constantly harass the Crusaders with lightning raids.

== Battle ==
The Turks launched a particularly heavy ambush as the Crusaders attempted to finally cross the river. They used their usual tactic of attacking and then quickly retreating before the enemy could regroup and counter-attack. On this occasion however, Louis had already placed his strongest knights to the front, side and rear, allowing these troops to engage the Turks before they could do much damage.

The Turks suffered heavy casualties, although many were able to escape back into the mountains on their swift horses. According to William of Tyre, writing later, the Crusaders also managed to capture many of the raiders. Neither William nor Odo reported on total Crusader casualties, although it can be assumed they were light because only one significant nobleman, Milo of Nogent, was killed. A rumour that defence was led by an unknown white-clad knight gained popularity among the Crusaders following the battle.

== Aftermath ==
The victory was not enough to stop the Turkish attacks. Just days after the Battle of the Meander, the French army suffered a catastrophic defeat at Mount Cadmus. Nevertheless, historian Jonathon Phillips says that the Battle of the Meander is important because it helps in fully understanding the failure of the Second Crusade. He says that this engagement shows that the failure of the Crusade was caused by any inferior martial abilities of the Crusaders, as may seem the case.
