= Battle of Constantinople (1147) =

Battle between the Byzantines and German crusaders

- Part of the Second Crusade
Date	September 1147
Location	Constantinople (modern-day Istanbul, Turkey)
Result	Byzantine victory

Belligerents
Byzantine Empire	German crusaders (Holy Roman Empire)

Commanders and leaders
Prosouch, Basil Tzikandyles (Manuel I in overall command)	Unknown (Conrad III in overall command)

Strength
Unknown – described as smaller than the German force by Byzantine historian John Kinnamos	Unknown – Only part was involved, the entire German army had 20,000 combatants

Casualties and losses
Unknown	Unknown (possibly heavy according to Michael Angold)

The Battle of Constantinople in 1147 was a large-scale clash between the forces of the Byzantine Empire and the German Crusaders of the Second Crusade, led by Conrad III of Germany, fought on the outskirts of the Byzantine capital Constantinople. The Byzantine Emperor Manuel I Komnenos was deeply concerned by the presence of a large and unruly army in the immediate vicinity of his capital and of the unfriendly attitude of its leaders. A similarly sized French Crusader army was also approaching Constantinople, and the possibility of the two armies combining at the city was viewed with great alarm by Manuel. Following earlier armed clashes with the Crusaders and perceived insults from Conrad, Manuel arrayed some of his forces outside the walls of Constantinople. Part of the German army then attacked and was defeated; according to British historian Michael Angold, they suffered heavy losses. Following this defeat the Crusaders agreed to be quickly ferried across the Bosporus to Asia Minor.

Though limited in its strategic importance, the battle is significant in being a rare instance where Byzantine tactical dispositions are described in detail in the primary sources of the period.

== Background ==
The Second Crusade (1145–1149) was instigated by Pope Eugenius III in response to the fall of the County of Edessa to the forces of the Muslim leader Zengi. The county had been founded during the First Crusade. The Second Crusade was the first to be led by kings, namely Conrad III of Germany and Louis VII of France. The armies of the two kings marched separately across Europe. After crossing into Byzantine territory in the Balkans, both armies made their way towards the Byzantine capital Constantinople. The Crusader armies intended to take the overland route across Asia Minor to reach the Holy Land.

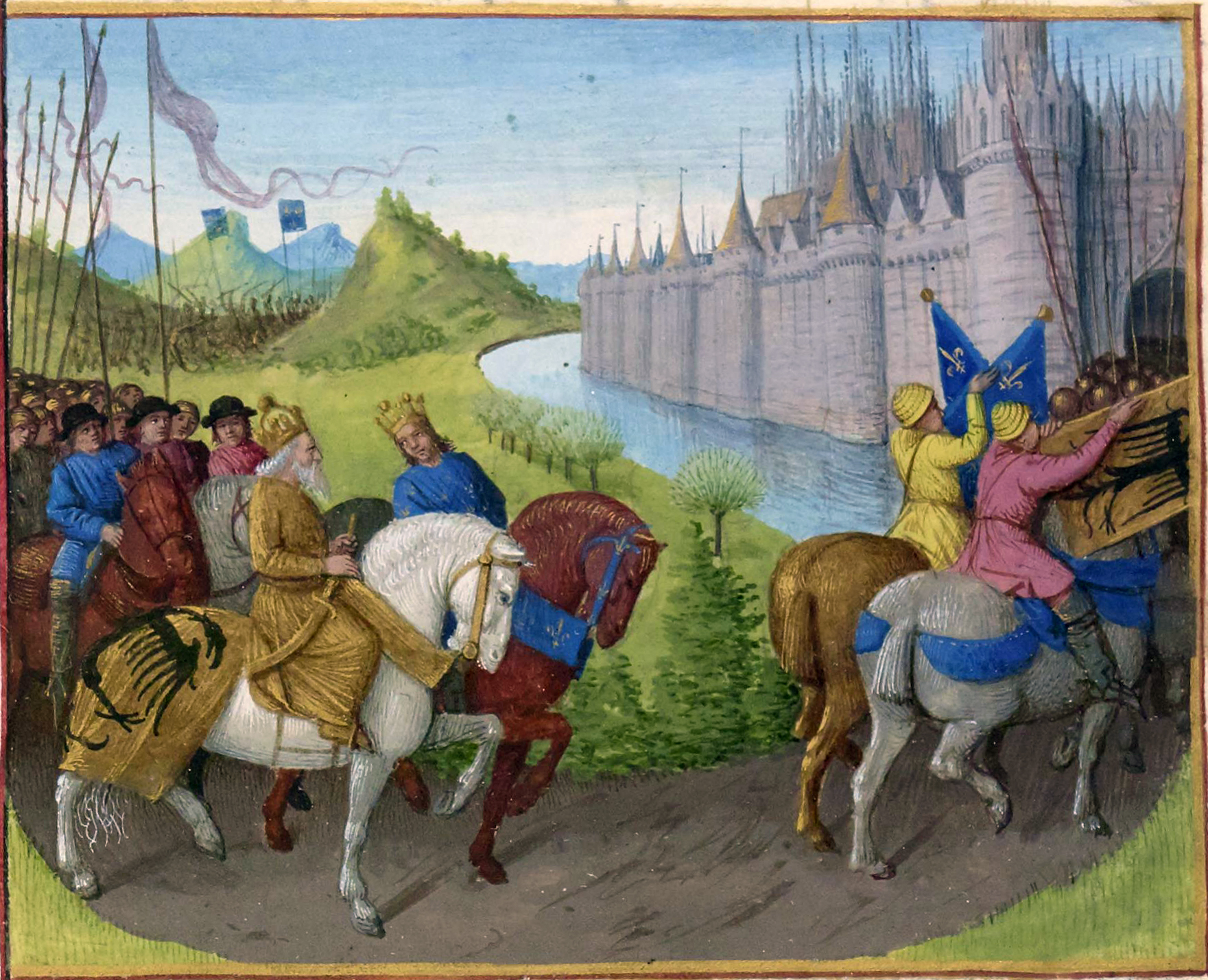
Arrival of the Second Crusade before Constantinople, portrayed in Jean Fouquet's painting from around 1455–1460, Arrivée des croisés à Constantinople

Conrad had insulted Manuel by calling him "King of the Greeks" rather than his formal title of "Emperor of the Romans", and the imperial pretensions of the Germans made them far more suspect in Byzantine eyes than were the French. Following oaths taken by the German leaders that they intended no injury to the Byzantine Empire, Manuel made preparations for markets to be made available as the Crusader army crossed imperial territory. A Byzantine force under the experienced general Prosouch (Borsuq), who was of Turkish origin, shadowed the Germans. A minor clash between the Byzantine force and the Crusaders occurred near Adrianople, with the Byzantines repulsing an attack by Conrad's nephew Frederick Barbarossa. The Crusaders also suffered a natural disaster when part of their encampment was swept away by a flash flood with considerable loss of life.

Manuel wished to induce the Crusaders to cross to Asia Minor by the Hellespont, keeping them away from Constantinople. However, they ignored the advice of Manuel's ambassador and pushed towards Constantinople, arriving on 10 September. Manuel had extensively repaired and strengthened the walls of his capital as a safeguard against any Crusader aggression. The Germans encamped around the suburban palace of Philopatium but so pillaged it that it became uninhabitable. They moved to another suburban palace, Pikridion. The Crusader force, which may have been suffering from a lack of food, made depredations on and acts of violence against the local population. Manuel was determined to get the Germans across the Bosporus as quickly as possible and mobilised part of his military forces to induce them to move.

== Battle ==
The Byzantine force was placed under the command of two generals, Prosouch and Basil Tzikandyles. They were instructed to make a stand confronting the Germans, and by their presence provoke an attack. The Byzantine army was smaller than the Crusader army, but as the contemporary Byzantine historian John Kinnamos states, "it was equally superior in military science and perseverance in battle". Prosouch and Tzikandyles had earlier been sent to observe the German army at a place called Longoi. They had reported to Emperor Manuel that, although the Germans were individually impressive and well armoured, their cavalry was not swift and they lacked discipline.

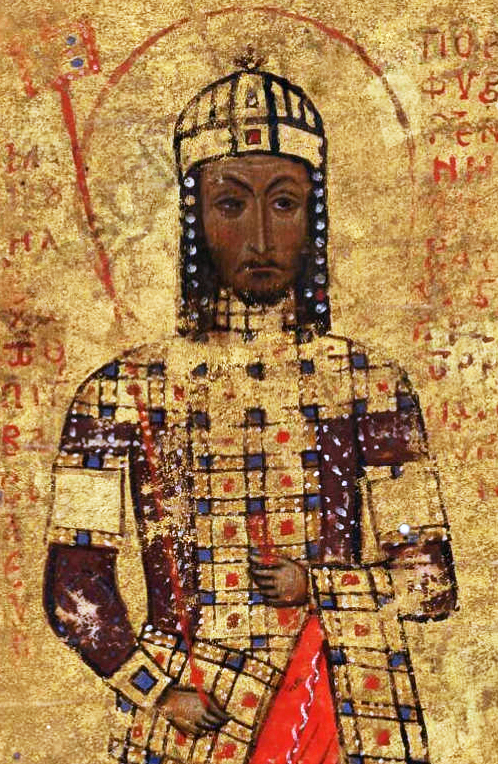
Emperor Manuel I Komnenos

The array of the Byzantine army, unusually, is described in some detail by Kinnamos. To the fore, "far forward", were four units (taxiarchiai) of the "most unwarlike, common part of the army"; Kinnamos' wording indicates that these were infantry. Behind these were drawn up the heaviest and most well-armoured cavalry, the kataphraktoi, the elite of the army. Next were "those who rode swift horses", the koursores, a more mobile form of close-combat cavalry. Finally, in the rear were the Cumans, Seljuk Turks and the "Romans' archer force", all presumably horse archers. This formation is unusual for a pitched battle and is essentially the reverse of standard Byzantine practice, as exemplified by the Battle of Sirmium in 1167. At Sirmium the horse archers were thrown forward to skirmish with and provoke the enemy, the koursores were placed as flank guards, the kataphraktoi were at the front of the main body of the army whilst the infantry were held in reserve in the rear.

The Byzantinist John Birkenmeier argues that this array was dictated by the particular circumstances of the battle; the Byzantines knew the ground intimately as it was just beyond the walls of Constantinople and were aware of the German dispositions, so that they did not need to use their horse archers as a scouting or screening force. Indeed, the Byzantine array was more like that used by Alexios I Komnenos at the Battle of Philomelion in 1116, where the infantry were used to blunt enemy attacks allowing the cavalry to make controlled counter-attacks from behind the infantry's protective screen. In addition the lighter-armed troops, by being placed in the rear, could both cover a retreat or exploit a victory, depending on circumstances.

According to Kinnamos, that part of the Crusader army confronted by the Byzantines was "seized by a great eagerness and disorder" and attacked "at a run". A fierce battle developed; in response to the reckless attack of the Germans, the Byzantines "scientifically resisted and slew them". A contemporary encomium (collection of praise poems) addressed to Manuel describes the Cuman horse archers as playing a notable part in the fighting. The Germans suffered heavy casualties. It is clear that not all of the German army was involved in the conflict; Conrad was with another, possibly larger, section of the army. He appears to have been at a considerable distance from the scene of the action as he did not learn of the reverse that his troops had suffered for some time.

== Aftermath ==
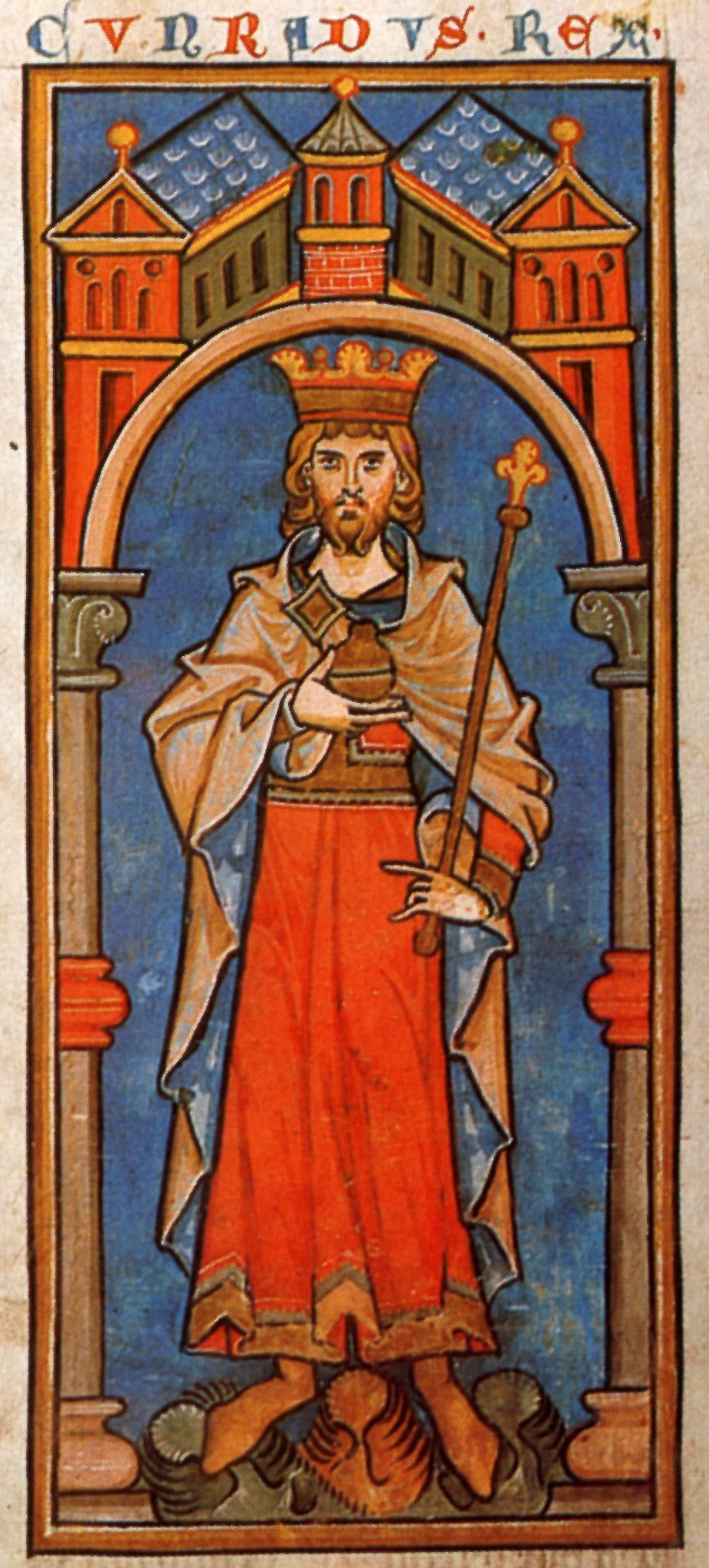
King Conrad III in a 13th-century miniature

The show of military force on the part of the Byzantines persuaded Conrad to accede to Manuel's wishes and have the bulk of his army speedily ferried across the Bosporos to Damalis. Manuel's gravest concern, the threat that the German and French Crusader armies might combine immediately outside his capital, had been averted. With the Germans on the Asian shore he opened negotiations with Conrad once again. Manuel wanted assurances that the Germans would restore to him any land they might conquer that had once been Byzantine, but Conrad was reluctant to agree to this. Manuel offered Conrad an alliance but was rejected. The German Crusaders then, without active Byzantine guidance (the Crusaders later alleged that their local guides were in league with the Seljuk Turks) or adequate supplies, pushed into the interior of Anatolia. At Dorylaeum, they were met by the forces of the Seljuk sultan and, as they were half-starving, were forced to retreat. The Turks punitively harassed the retreating Crusaders, and the retreat became a rout.

Meeting up with the French army at Nicaea, the combined Crusader force then took the coastal route towards Attaleia. Though within nominal Byzantine territory, the Crusaders continued to be attacked by the Turks who were allegedly aided by the local Greek population. Though the bulk of his army marched to Attaleia, Conrad took ship with his entourage at Ephesus and sailed back to Constantinople. Manuel received him magnificently and personally gave him medical attention when he fell ill. The rapprochement between the two sovereigns was sealed with the negotiation of a dynastic marriage. Manuel undertook to ship Conrad's diminished force to Palestine, where the forces of the Second Crusade ultimately met with failure when defeated during their siege of Damascus.

== See also ==
- Komnenian army
