= Battle of Dorylaeum =

Battle of Dorylaeum can refer to:

- Battle of Dorylaeum (1097), a battle between crusaders and the Seljuk Turks during the First Crusade
- Battle of Dorylaeum (1147), a battle between German crusaders and the Seljuk Turks during the Second Crusade
