= Battle of Laodicea (1147) =

- Part of the Second Crusade
Date	16 November 1147
Location	Laodicea on the Lycus, Turkey
Result	Seljuk victory

Belligerents
Holy Roman Empire	Sultanate of Rum

Commanders and leaders
Otto of Freising; Bernard of Carinthia †	Unknown

Strength
Unknown	Unknown

Casualties and losses
Heavy	Unknown

The Battle of Laodicea was a military engagement during the Second Crusade. The German contingent led by Otto of Freising was ambushed and destroyed near Laodicea by the Seljuk Turks.

== Background ==
German King Conrad III crossed Anatolia with his army. The German army was divided into two, one led by Conrad, which had the knights and infantry, and the second force led by brother of the king Bishop Otto of Freising, which consisted of infantry and camp followers. The second contingent was to take the coastal road. On 25 October 1147 Conrad's division was ambushed by the Seljuks at Dorylauem. The German force was destroyed and the king was wounded, forcing him to retreat back to Byzantine lands.

== Battle ==
Otto's division took the coastal route through the Aegean Sea. They turned to Alaşehir where they arrived at Meander River. The Germans did not have proper boats to cross the river, so they were forced to pass by themselves, which weakened and exhausted their forces. They headed towards Laodicea up to Gediz River hoping to rest and gather supplies there. However the Germans were ambushed by the Seljuks, inflicting heavy losses on them. Count Bernard of Carinthia was killed alongside the majority of his men.

Otto was forced to retreat to the coast, marching towards Antalya. The Germans faced exhaustion, starvation, and thirst, forcing them to kill their horses and cattle. Seeing this, the Seljuks attacked them again. Showing no sign of resistance, only a handful of men survived and reached Antalya. Otto reached Antalya and traveled to Jerusalem by sea, while others slowly made their way to the Levant using coastal roads.
