= Beylik of Çubukoğulları =

Turkish principality (1085–1112)

Çubukoğulları
- 1085–1112
- Capital: Harput (modern Elazığ)
- Common languages: Old Anatolian Turkish
- Religion: Sunni Islam
- Government: Monarchy
- Bey
  - 1085–1092: Çubuk
  - 1092–1112: Mehmet
- Historical era: Medieval
  - Established: 1085
  - Disestablished: 1112
Preceded by	Succeeded by
Great Seljuq Empire	Artuqid dynasty

Beylik of Çubukoğulları (Turkish: Çubukoğulları Beyliği, literally "sons of Çubuk") was a small and short-lived principality centred on Harput (modern Elazığ in Turkey) between 1085 and 1112.

Çubuk was a commander in the Seljuk army. After the battle of Malazgirt in 1071, he was tasked with capturing the important fort of Harput (modern Elazığ). He captured the fort and continued making conquests in the surrounding area. He founded a principality under the suzerainty of the Seljuk Empire that included Palu, Genç, Çemişgezek, and Eğin (modern Kemaliye).

Çubuk sided with Muslim ibn Quraysh during a battle with Suleiman, the Anatolian Seljuk Sultan. However, he switched sides mid-battle, leading to the defeat and death of the ruler of Mosul. Hence, he became a commander under Suleiman.

Çubuk also participated in the Battle of Ain Salm, where he again switched sides to ally with Tutush, which led to the defeat and death of the Sultan and the captivity of his sons.

Çubuk was succeeded by his son Mehmet after 1092. After Mehmet's death in 1112 or 1113, the Beylik was incorporated into the realm of Artuqids.
