= Abu'l-Qasim (Seljuk governor of Nicaea) =

3rd Seljuk governor of Nicaea
- In office 1084–1092
- Preceded by: Suleiman ibn Qutulmish
- Succeeded by: Kilij Arslan I

Abu'l-Qasim (Turkish: Ebu'l-Kasım, transcribed by contemporary Greek sources as Apelchasem) was the Seljuk governor of Nicaea, the Seljuk capital, from 1084 to his death in 1092.

== Life ==
Abu'l-Qasim is first mentioned by Byzantine princess and historian Anna Komnene as being appointed as satrap (governor) of Nicaea by Suleiman ibn Qutulmish upon departure on his campaign to Antioch. Upon Suleiman's death, he was able to maintain his position in Nicaea and establish his brother Poulchazes as governor of Cappadocia, which might point to a family background close to the Seljuk clan. His authority however was limited to his own domain in Bithynia and Cappadocia, where his brother ruled; most of the Anatolian Seljuk realm fractured into independent or semi-independent emirates like the one led by Tzachas of Smyrna. Using his control of the Anatolian shore of the Marmara Sea, Abu'l-Qasim decided to build a navy at Kios and challenge the Byzantine navy. The Byzantine emperor Alexios I Komnenos sent two of his generals, Manuel Boutoumites and Tatikios, against him. Abu'l-Qasim's army was defeated, his fleet destroyed, and he himself was forced to retreat to Nicaea, from where he concluded a truce with the emperor (see Seljuk campaigns in the Aegean).

== Sources ==
- Beihammer, Alexander Daniel (2017). Byzantium and the Emergence of Muslim-Turkish Anatolia, Ca. 1040-1130. Taylor & Francis. ISBN 978-1351983860.
- Speros Vryonis, The Decline of Medieval Hellenism in Asia Minor and the Process of Islamization from the Eleventh through the Fifteenth Century (University of California Press, 1971)
