= Second Crusade =

1147–1149 Christian holy war

- Part of the Crusades and the Reconquista and Byzantine–Seljuk wars
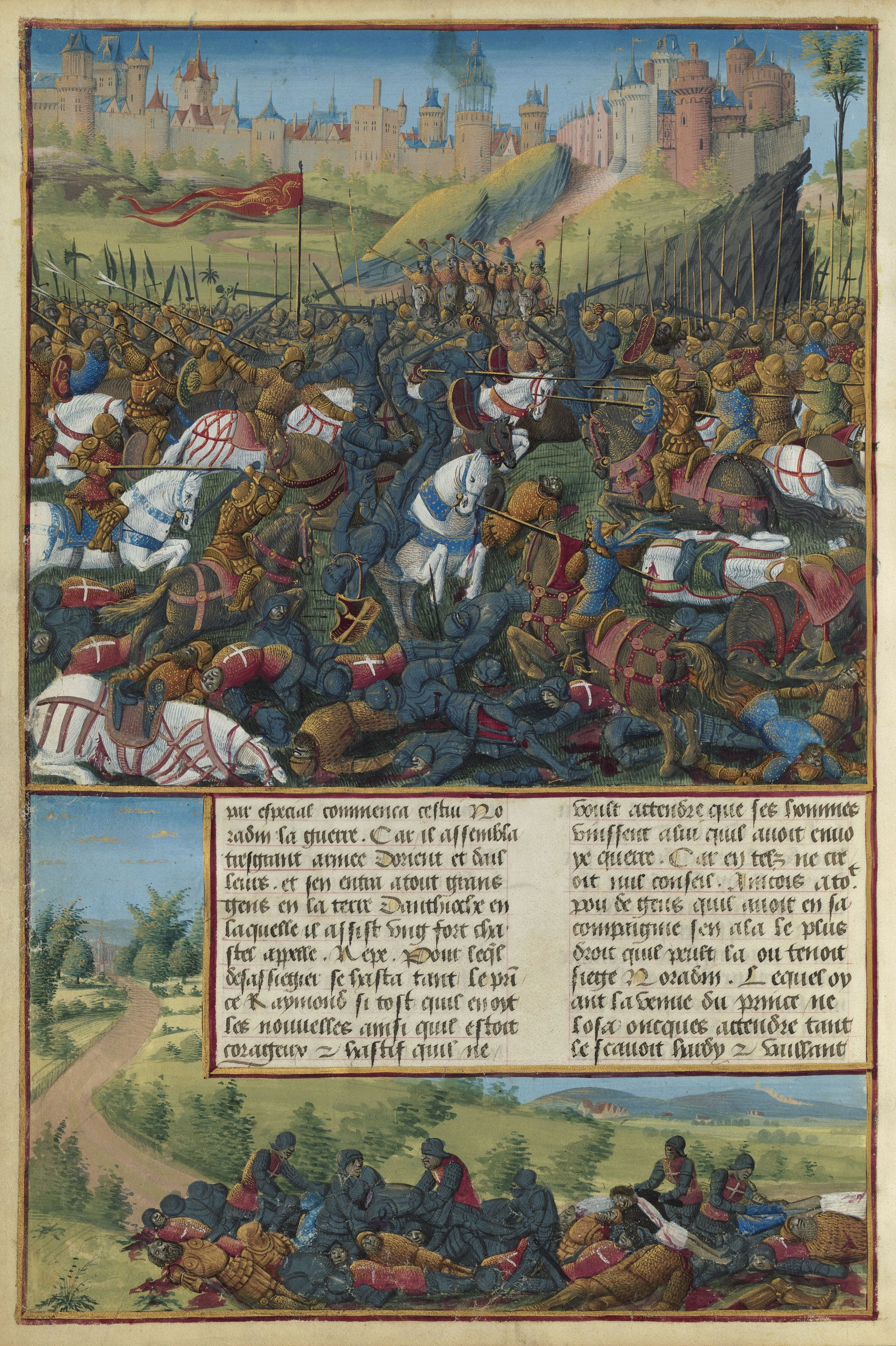
- Illustration of the Battle of Inab by Jean Colombe from the Passages d'outremer by Sébastien Mamerot, c. 1473–1474
Date	1147–1150
Location	Iberia, Near East, Egypt
Result	See § Aftermath: Crusader victory in Iberia.; Byzantine victory in Balkans.; Crusader defeat in Anatolia and the Levant.
Territorial changes	Lisbon captured by the Portuguese; Tarragona and Tortosa captured by the Catalans

Belligerents
Kingdom of France; Holy Roman Empire; Kingdom of England; Kingdom of Sicily; Kingdom of Portugal; County of Barcelona; Kingdom of León; Kingdom of Jerusalem; County of Tripoli; Principality of Antioch; Knights Templar	Sultanate of Rum; Zengid Atabegate; Burid Emirate; Fatimid Caliphate; Almoravid Emirate 1147: Byzantine Empire (Note: Battle of Constantinople (1147))

Commanders and leaders
Baldwin III of Jerusalem; Raymond II of Tripoli; Raymond of Poitiers †; Louis VII of France; Alfonso Jordan; Theodwin; Conrad III of Germany; Ottokar III of Styria; Thierry of Alsace; Joscelin II of Edessa; Roger II of Sicily; Afonso I of Portugal; Alfonso VII of León; Ramon Berenguer IV of Barcelona; Robert de Craon	Mesud I; Nur al-Din Zengi; Mu'in ad-Din Unur 1147: Manuel I Komnenos

The Second Crusade (1147–1149) was the second major crusade launched from Europe. The Second Crusade was started in response to the fall of the County of Edessa in 1144 to the Seljuk forces of Zengi. The county had been founded during the First Crusade (1096–1099) by Baldwin in 1098. While it was the first Crusader state to be founded, it was also the first to fall.

The Second Crusade was announced by Pope Eugene III and was led in the east by European kings Louis VII of France and Conrad III of Germany, with help from other European nobles. The armies of the two kings marched separately across Europe. After crossing Byzantine territory into Anatolia, both armies were separately defeated by the Seljuk Turks. The main Western Christian source, Odo of Deuil, and Syriac Christian sources claim that the Byzantine Emperor Manuel I Komnenos secretly hindered the Crusaders' progress, particularly in Anatolia, where he is alleged to have deliberately ordered Turks to attack them. However, this alleged sabotage was likely fabricated by Odo, who saw the empire as an obstacle; moreover, Emperor Manuel had no political reason to do so. Louis and Conrad reached Jerusalem in 1148, where the remnants of their armies participated in an ill-advised attack on Damascus that ended in their retreat. Crusader efforts were successful in Iberia, where several territories—including Lisbon, the future capital of the Portuguese Empire—were conquered.

The initial response to the crusade bull, with incipit Quantum praedecessores, was poor, and it in fact had to be reissued when it was clear that King Louis would be taking part in the expedition. Louis had been considering an expedition independently of the pope, which he announced to his Christmas court at Bourges in 1145. It is debatable whether Louis was planning a crusade of his own or in fact a pilgrimage, as he wanted to fulfill a vow made by his dead brother Philip to go to the Holy Land. It is probable that Louis had made this decision without having heard about the bull. In any case, Abbot Suger and other nobles were not in favour of Louis's plans, as he would be gone from the kingdom for several years. Louis consulted Bernard of Clairvaux, who referred him back to Pope Eugene. By that time Louis would have definitely heard about the papal bull, and Eugene enthusiastically supported Louis's crusade. The bull was reissued on 1 March 1146, and Eugene authorized Bernard to preach the news throughout France.

== Background ==
=== Fall of Edessa ===
After the First Crusade and the minor Crusade of 1101, there were three Crusader states established in the east: the Kingdom of Jerusalem, the Principality of Antioch and the County of Edessa. A fourth, the County of Tripoli, was established in 1109. Edessa was the most northerly of these, and also the weakest and least populated; as such, it was subject to frequent attacks from the surrounding Muslim states ruled by the Artuqids, Danishmendids and Seljuk Turks. Baldwin II, Count of Edessa, and Joscelin of Courtenay were taken captive after their defeat at the Battle of Harran in 1104. Baldwin ascended to king of Jerusalem in 1118, and Joscelin succeeded him as count of Edessa. Although Edessa recovered somewhat after the Battle of Azaz in 1125, Joscelin was killed in battle in 1131. His successor Joscelin II was forced into an alliance with the Byzantine Empire, but in 1143 both Byzantine Emperor John II Komnenos and King Fulk of Jerusalem died. Joscelin had also quarrelled with the Count of Tripoli and the Prince of Antioch, leaving Edessa with no powerful allies.

Meanwhile, Zengi, atabeg of Mosul, had added Aleppo to his rule in 1128, the key to power in Syria, contested between Mosul and Damascus. Both Zengi and Baldwin turned their attention towards Damascus; in 1129 Baldwin led a failed campaign against Damascus. Damascus, ruled by the Burid dynasty, later allied with King Fulk when Zengi besieged the city in 1139 and 1140; the alliance was negotiated by the chronicler Usama ibn Munqidh.

In late 1144, Joscelin II allied with the Artuqids and marched out of Edessa with almost his entire army to support the Artuqid army against Aleppo. Seeking to take advantage of Fulk's death in 1143, Zengi marched north to besiege Edessa, which fell to him after a month on 24 December 1144. Manasses of Hierges, Philip of Milly and others were sent from Jerusalem to assist but arrived too late. Joscelin II continued to rule the remnants of the county from Turbessel, but little by little the rest of the territory was captured by Muslims or sold to the Byzantines. Zengi was praised throughout the Muslim world as "defender of the faith" and al-Malik al-Mansur, "the victorious king". He did not pursue an attack on the remaining territory of Edessa or on the Principality of Antioch, as was feared. Events in Mosul compelled him to return home, and he once again set his sights on Damascus. However, he was assassinated by a slave in 1146 and was succeeded in Aleppo by his son Nur ad-Din.

=== Papal bull and French plans ===
The news of the fall of Edessa was brought back to Europe first by pilgrims early in 1145, and then by embassies from Antioch, Jerusalem and Armenia. Bishop Hugh of Jabala reported the news to Pope Eugene III, who issued the bull Quantum praedecessores on 1 December, calling for a crusade to rescue the remaining states. Hugh also told Eugene of an eastern Christian king who, it was hoped, would bring relief to the Crusader states: this is the first documented mention of Prester John. Eugene did not control Rome and lived instead at Viterbo, but nevertheless the Second Crusade was meant to be more organised and centrally controlled than the First Crusade: the armies would be led by the strongest kings of Europe, and a route would be planned.

Upon hearing of the fall of Edessa, Louis VII of France was already preparing a crusade of his own, independent of Eugene's bull. It is possible that the embassies from the east had visited Louis as well. Louis was obsessed with a sin he had committed in a military campaign he undertook earlier in Champagne and was planning a pilgrimage to the Holy Land to make up for it. Louis and his wife Eleanor of Aquitaine were at Bourges when the message of the bull arrived, and Louis responded enthusiastically on Christmas Day that he would lead a crusade. Noting a lack of enthusiasm among the French nobility, Louis postponed further action till Easter 1146. However, in consultation with Abbot Bernard of Clairvaux, Louis eventually sought Eugene's blessing, and Louis' crusade enjoyed full papal support. Final planning took place at Saint-Denis over Easter that year, which Eugene attended. Louis delegated administration of his kingdom to Eugene, who appointed Abbot Suger and Ralph I of Vermandois as co-regents.

=== Bernard of Clairvaux ===
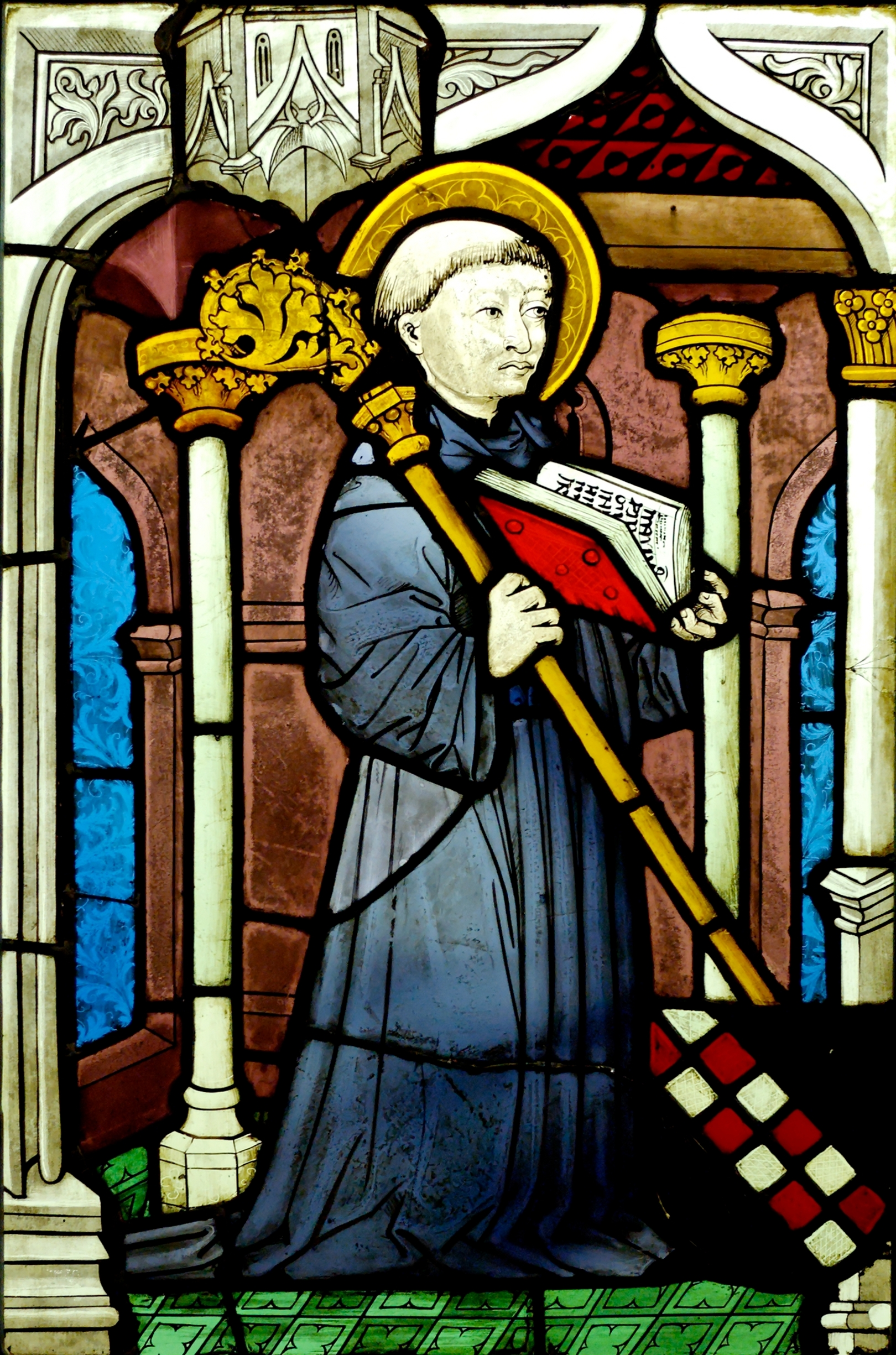
St Bernard in stained glass, from the Upper Rhine, c. 1450

The pope commissioned Bernard to preach the Second Crusade and granted the same indulgences for it which Pope Urban II had accorded to the First Crusade. A parliament was convoked at Vezelay in Burgundy in 1146, and Bernard preached before the assembly on 31 March. Louis, Eleanor, and the princes and lords present prostrated themselves at the feet of Bernard to receive the pilgrims' cross. Bernard then passed into Germany, and the reported miracles which multiplied almost at his every step undoubtedly contributed to the success of his mission. At Speyer, Conrad III of Germany and his nephew, later Holy Roman Emperor Frederick Barbarossa, received the cross from the hand of Bernard. Pope Eugene came in person to France to encourage the enterprise.

For all his overmastering zeal, Bernard was by nature neither a bigot nor a persecutor. As in the First Crusade, the preaching inadvertently led to attacks on Jews; a fanatical French monk named Rudolf was apparently inspiring massacres of Jews in the Rhineland, Cologne, Mainz, Worms and Speyer, with Rudolf claiming Jews were not contributing financially to the rescue of the Holy Land. Bernard and other nobles were vehemently opposed to these attacks, and so Bernard travelled from Flanders to Germany to deal with the problem and quieten the mobs. Bernard then found Rudolf in Mainz and was able to silence him, returning him to his monastery.

== Reconquista in Iberia ==
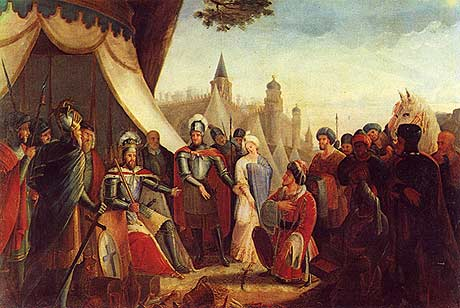
The Siege of Lisbon by D. Afonso Henriques by Joaquim Rodrigues Braga (1840)

In the spring of 1147, the pope authorized the expansion of the crusade into the Iberian Peninsula, in the context of the Reconquista. He also authorized Alfonso VII of León and Castile to equate his campaigns against the Moors with the rest of the Second Crusade. In May 1147, the first contingents of Crusaders left from Dartmouth in England for the Holy Land. Bad weather forced the ships to stop on the northern Portuguese coast at Porto on 16 June 1147. There they were convinced to meet with King Afonso I of Portugal.

The Crusaders agreed to help Afonso attack Lisbon, with a solemn agreement that offered to them the pillage of the city's goods and the ransom money for expected prisoners. However, some of the Crusader forces were hesitant to help, remembering a previous failed attempt on the city by a combined force of Portuguese and northern Crusaders during the earlier siege of Lisbon in 1142. The 1147 siege lasted from 1 July to 25 October, when the Moorish rulers agreed to surrender primarily due to hunger within the city. Most of the Crusaders settled in the city, but some of them set sail and continued to the Holy Land. Those who stayed helped to conquer Sintra, Almada, Palmela and Setúbal, and they were allowed to settle in the conquered lands.

Those who continued on laid siege to Faro in order to extort protection money but the plan failed. Almost at the same time on the peninsula, King Alfonso VII of León, Count Ramon Berenguer IV of Barcelona, and others led a mixed army of Catalan, Leonese, Castilian and French Crusaders against the rich port city of Almería. With support from a Genoese–Pisan navy, the city was occupied in October 1147.

Ramon Berenguer then invaded the lands of the Almoravid taifa kingdom of Valencia and Murcia. The fraction of the crusading forces which had aided the Portuguese in the capture of Lisbon were encouraged to participate in the proposed siege of Tortosa by Ramon and the English papal envoy Nicholas Breakspear. In December 1148, he captured Tortosa after a five-month siege—again with the help of the Crusaders. A large number of Crusader forces were rewarded with lands inside and in the vicinity of Tortosa. The next year, Fraga, Lleida and Mequinenza in the confluence of the Segre and Ebro rivers fell to his army.

== Forces ==
=== Muslims ===
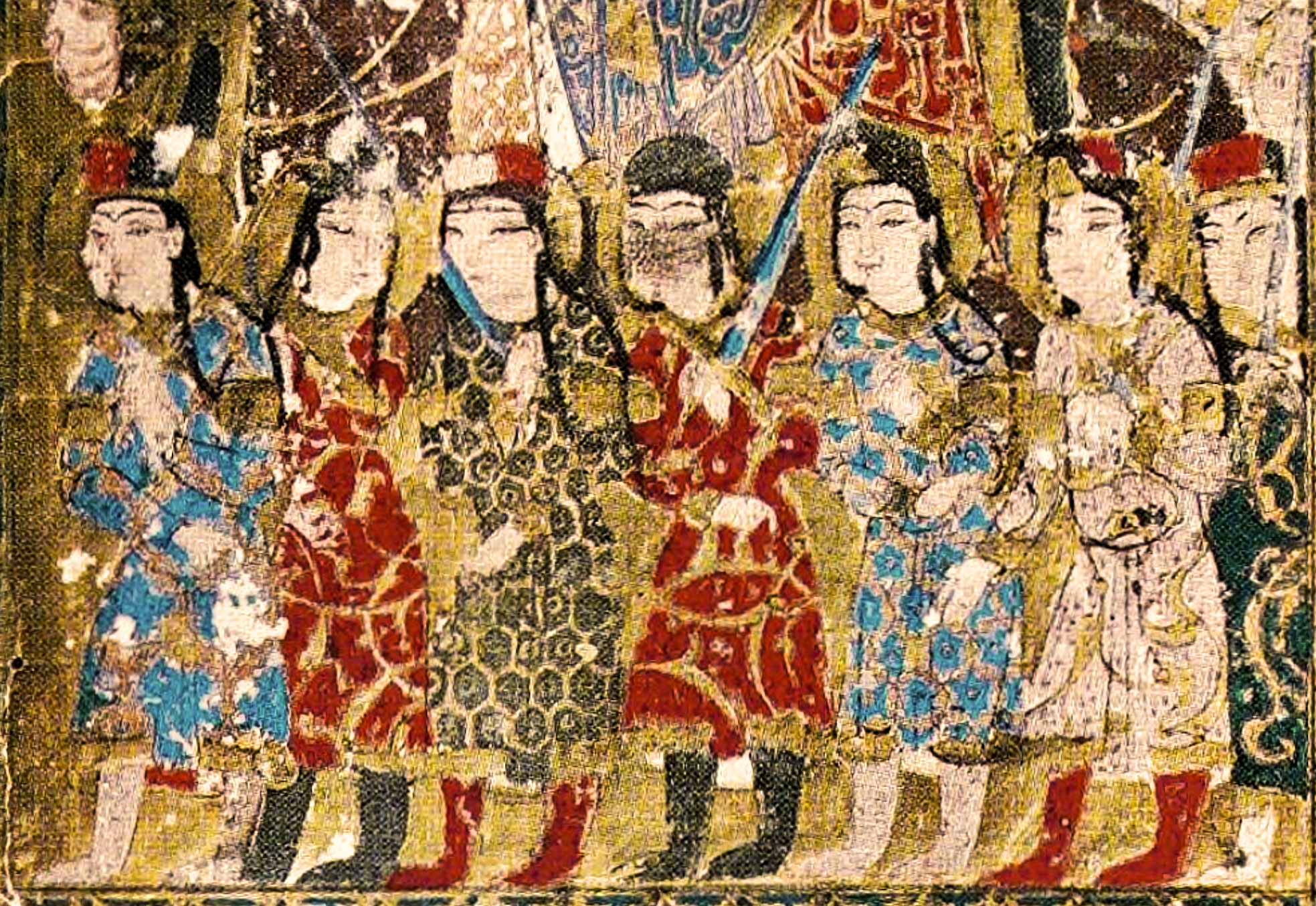
Zengid soldiers, armed with long swords and wearing Turkic military dress: the aqbiya turkiyya coat, tiraz armbands, boots and sharbush hat. Manuscript Kitab al-Aghani, 1218–1219, Mosul.

The professional soldiers of the Muslim states, who were usually ethnic Turks, tended to be very well-trained and equipped. The basis of the military system in the Islamic Middle East was the iqta' system of fiefs, which supported a certain number of troops in every district. In the event of war, the ahdath militias, based in the cities under the command of the ra'is (chief), and who were usually ethnic Arabs, were called upon to increase the number of troops. The ahdath militia, though less well trained than the Turkish professional troops, were often very strongly motivated by religion, especially the concept of jihad. Further support came from Turkmen and Kurdish auxiliaries, who could be called upon in times of war, though these forces were prone to indiscipline.

The principal Islamic commander was Mu'in ad-Din Unur, the atabeg of Damascus from 1138 to 1149. Damascus was supposedly ruled by the Burid dynasty of Damascus, but Anur, who commanded the army, was the real ruler of the city. Historian David Nicolle describes Anur as an able general and diplomat, also well known as a patron of the arts. Because the Burid dynasty was displaced in 1154 by the Zengid dynasty, Anur's role in repulsing the Second Crusade has been largely erased with historians and chroniclers loyal to the Zengids giving the credit to Anur's rival, Nur al-Din Zengi, the emir of Aleppo.

=== Crusaders ===
The German contingent comprised about 2,000 knights; the French contingent had about 700 knights from the king's lands while the nobility raised smaller numbers of knights; and the Kingdom of Jerusalem had about 950 knights and 6,000 infantry.

The French knights preferred to fight on horseback, while the German knights liked to fight on foot. Chronicler John Kinnamos writes "the French are particularly capable of riding horseback in good order and attacking with the spear, and their cavalry surpasses that of the Germans in speed. The Germans, however, are able to fight on foot better than the French and excel in using the great sword."

King Conrad was considered to be a brave knight, though often described as indecisive in moments of crisis. King Louis was a devout Christian with a sensitive side who was often attacked by contemporaries like Bernard for being more in love with his wife Eleanor than he was interested in war or politics.

Stephen, King of England, did not participate in the Second Crusade due to internal conflicts in his kingdom. Meanwhile, King David I of Scotland was dissuaded by his subjects from joining the crusade.

== In the East ==
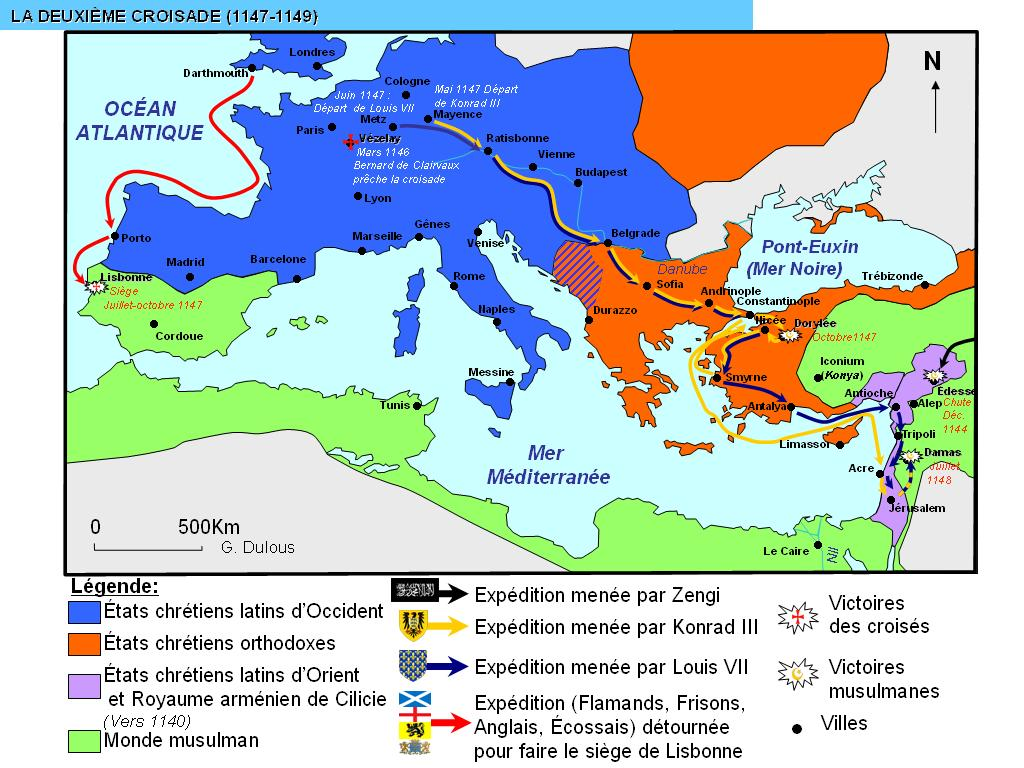
Map of Second Crusade

Joscelin II retook the town of Edessa and besieged the citadel following Zengi's murder, but Nur ad-Din defeated him in November 1146. On 16 February 1147, the French Crusaders met at Étampes to discuss their route. The Germans had already decided to travel overland through Hungary; they regarded the sea route as politically impractical because Roger II of Sicily was an enemy of Conrad. Many of the French nobles distrusted the land route, which would take them through the Byzantine Empire, the reputation of which still suffered from the accounts of the First Crusaders. Nevertheless, the French decided to follow Conrad and to set out on 15 June. Roger II took offence and refused to participate any longer. In France, Abbot Suger was elected by a great council at Étampes (and appointed by the pope) to act as one of the regents during the king's absence on crusade. In Germany, further preaching was done by Adam of Ebrach, and Otto of Freising also took the cross. The Germans planned to set out at Easter but did not leave until May.

=== German route ===
The German Crusaders, accompanied by the papal legate and Cardinal Theodwin, intended to meet the French in Constantinople. Ottokar III of Styria joined Conrad at Vienna, and Conrad's enemy Géza II of Hungary allowed them to pass through unharmed. When the German army of 20,000 men arrived in Byzantine territory, Emperor Manuel I Komnenos feared they were going to attack him and had Byzantine troops posted to ensure against trouble. A brief skirmish with some of the more unruly Germans occurred near Philippopolis and in Adrianople, where the Byzantine general Prosouch fought with Conrad's nephew, the future emperor Frederick I Barbarossa. Some German soldiers were killed in a flood at the beginning of September. On 10 September the Germans arrived at Constantinople, where relations with Manuel were poor, resulting in the Battle of Constantinople, after which the Germans became convinced that they should cross into Anatolia as quickly as possible. Manuel wanted Conrad to leave some of his troops behind, to assist in defending against attacks from Roger who had taken the opportunity to plunder the cities of Greece, but Conrad did not agree despite being a fellow enemy of Roger.

In Anatolia, Conrad decided not to wait for the French but marched towards Iconium, capital of the Seljuk Sultanate of Rum. Conrad split his army into two divisions. Much of the authority of the Byzantine Empire in the western provinces of Anatolia was more nominal than real, with much of the provinces being a no-man's land controlled by Turkish nomads. Conrad underestimated the length of the march against Anatolia and also assumed that the authority of Manuel was greater in Anatolia than was in fact the case. Conrad took the knights and the best troops with him to march overland while sending the camp followers with Otto of Freising to follow the coastal road. The Seljuks almost totally destroyed Conrad's party on 25 October 1147 at the Battle of Dorylaeum. In battle, the Turks used their typical tactic of feigning retreat and then returning to attack the small force of German cavalry which had separated from the main army to chase them. Conrad began a slow retreat back to Constantinople, his army harassed daily by the Turks, who attacked stragglers and defeated the rearguard. Conrad was wounded in a skirmish.

The other division of the German force, led by Otto, had marched south to the Mediterranean coast and was similarly defeated early in 1148. The force ran out of food while crossing inhospitable countryside and was ambushed by the Seljuks near Laodicea on 16 November 1147. The majority of Otto's force were either killed in battle or captured and sold into slavery.

=== French route ===
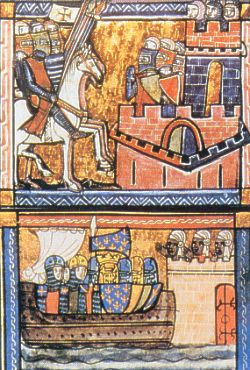
Louis VII of France

The French Crusaders departed from Metz in June 1147, led by Louis, Thierry of Alsace, Renaut I of Bar, Amadeus III of Savoy and his half-brother William V of Montferrat, William VII of Auvergne, and others, along with armies from Lorraine, Brittany, Burgundy and Aquitaine. A force from Provence, led by Alphonse of Toulouse, chose to wait until August and to cross by sea. At Worms, Louis joined with Crusaders from Normandy and England. They followed Conrad's route fairly peacefully, although Louis came into conflict with King Géza II of Hungary, when Géza discovered that Louis had allowed a failed Hungarian usurper, Boris Kalamanos, to join his army. Relations within Byzantine territory were also grim, and the Lorrainers, who had marched ahead of the rest of the French, also came into conflict with the slower Germans whom they met on the way.

Since the original negotiations between Louis and Manuel, Manuel had broken off his military campaign against Rûm, signing a truce with Sultan Mesud I. Manuel did this to give himself a free hand to concentrate on defending his empire from the Crusaders, who had gained a reputation for theft and treachery since the First Crusade and were widely suspected of harbouring sinister designs on Constantinople. Nevertheless, Manuel's relations with the French army were somewhat better than with the Germans, and Louis was entertained lavishly in Constantinople. Some of the French were outraged by Manuel's truce with the Seljuks and called for an alliance with Roger II and an attack on Constantinople, but Louis restrained them.

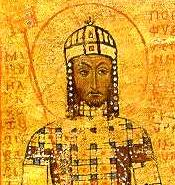
Emperor Manuel I

When the armies from Savoy, Auvergne and Montferrat joined Louis in Constantinople, having taken the land route through Italy and crossing from Brindisi to Durazzo, the entire army took ship across the Bosporus to Anatolia. The Greeks were encouraged by rumours that the Germans had captured Iconium, but Manuel refused to give Louis any Byzantine troops. Roger II had just invaded Byzantine territory, and Manuel needed all his army in the Peloponnese. Both the Germans and French therefore entered Asia without any Byzantine assistance, unlike the armies of the First Crusade. Following the example set by his grandfather Alexios I, Manuel had the French swear to return to the empire any territory they captured.

The French met the remnants of Conrad's army at Lopadion, and Conrad joined Louis's force. They followed Otto of Freising's route, moving closer to the Mediterranean coast, and arrived at Ephesus in December where they learned that the Turks were preparing to attack them. Manuel also sent ambassadors complaining about the pillaging and plundering that Louis had done along the way, and there was no guarantee that the Byzantines would assist them against the Turks. Meanwhile, Conrad fell sick and returned to Constantinople, where Manuel attended to him personally, and Louis, paying no attention to the warnings of a Turkish attack, marched out from Ephesus with the French and German contingent. The Turks were indeed waiting to attack, but at the Battle of Ephesus on 24 December 1147, the French proved victorious. The French fended off another Turkish ambush at the Battle of the Meander in the same month.

They reached Laodicea on the Lycus early in January 1148, just after Otto's army had been destroyed in the same area. Resuming the march, the vanguard under Amadeus of Savoy became separated from the rest of the army at the Battle of Mount Cadmus, where Louis's troops suffered heavy losses from the Turks on 6 January. According to Odo of Deuil, Louis climbed a rock and was ignored by the Turks, who did not recognize him. The Turks did not bother to attack further, and the French marched on to Attalia, continually harassed from afar by the Turks, who had also burned the land to prevent the French from replenishing food supplies for themselves and their horses. Louis no longer wanted to continue by land, and it was decided to gather a fleet at Attalia and to sail for Antioch. After being delayed for a month by storms, most of the promised ships did not arrive at all. Louis and his associates claimed the ships for themselves, while the rest of the army had to resume the long march to Antioch. The army was almost entirely destroyed, either by the Turks or by sickness.

=== Journey to Jerusalem ===
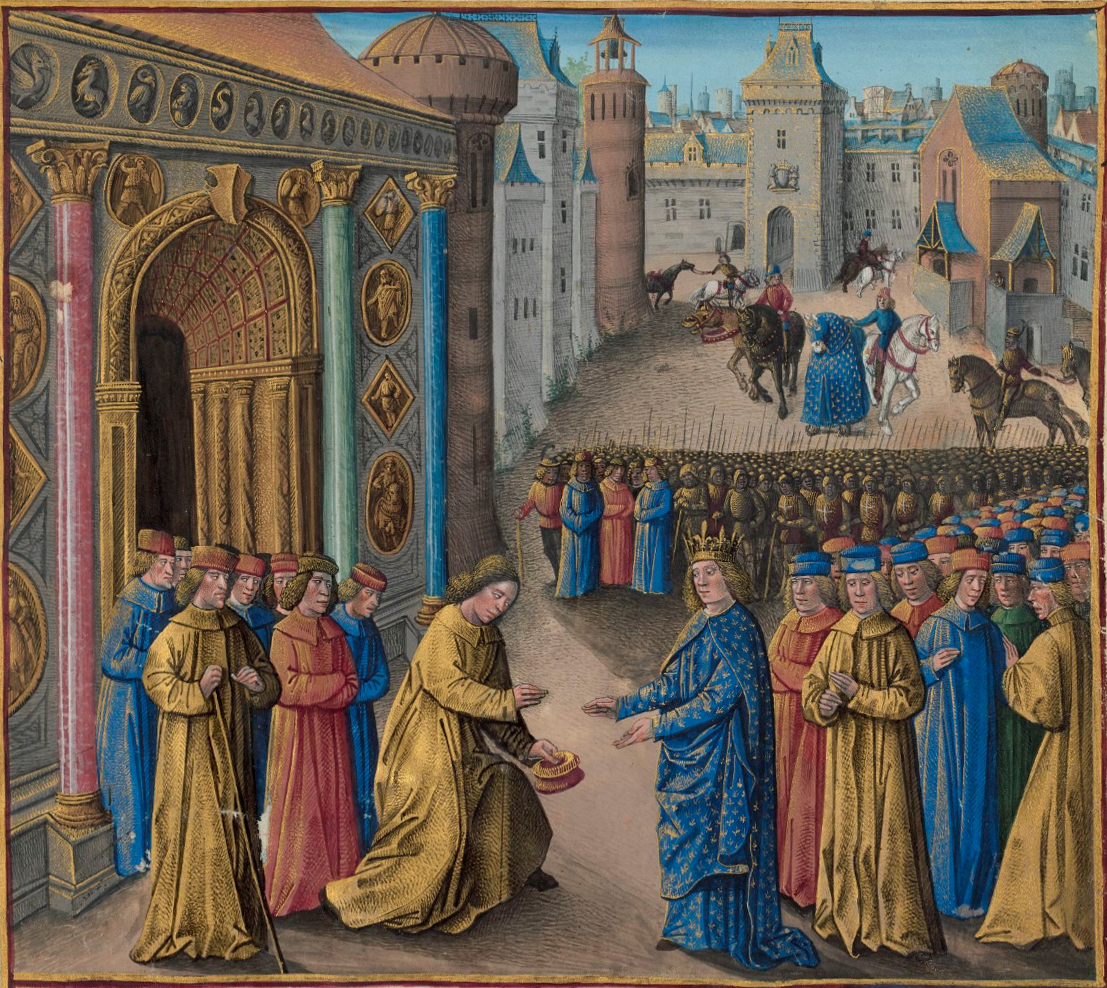
Raymond of Poitiers welcoming Louis VII in Antioch

Delayed by storms, Louis arrived in Antioch on 19 March; Amadeus of Savoy had died in Cyprus along the way. Louis was welcomed by Eleanor's uncle Raymond of Poitiers. Raymond expected him to help defend against the Turks and to accompany him on an expedition against Aleppo, the Muslim city that functioned as the gateway to Edessa, but Louis refused, preferring instead to finish his pilgrimage to Jerusalem rather than focus on the military aspect of the crusade.

Eleanor enjoyed her stay, but her uncle besought her to remain to enlarge family lands and divorce Louis if the king refused to help what was assuredly the military cause of the crusade. During this period, there were rumours of an affair between Raymond and Eleanor, which caused tensions in the marriage between Louis and Eleanor.

Louis quickly left Antioch for Tripoli with Eleanor under arrest. Meanwhile, Otto and the remnant of his troops arrived in Jerusalem early in April, and Conrad arrived soon after. Fulk, the Latin Patriarch of Jerusalem, was sent to invite Louis to join them. The fleet that had fought at Lisbon arrived around this time, as well as the Provençals who had left Europe under the command of Alfonso Jordan, Count of Toulouse. Alfonso did not reach Jerusalem; he died at Caesarea, supposedly poisoned by Raymond II of Tripoli, the nephew who feared his political aspirations in the county. The claim that Raymond had poisoned Alfonso caused much of the Provençal force to turn back and return home. The original focus of the crusade was the County of Edessa, but the preferred target of King Baldwin III and of the Knights Templar was Damascus.

In response to the arrival of the Crusaders, the regent of Damascus Mu'in ad-Din Unur started making feverish preparations for war, strengthening the fortifications of Damascus, ordering troops to his city and having the water sources along the road to Damascus destroyed or diverted. Unur sought help from the Zangid rulers of Aleppo and Mosul (who were normally his rivals), though forces from these states did not arrive in time to see combat outside of Damascus. It is almost certain that the Zangid rulers delayed sending troops to Damascus hoping their rival Unur might lose his city to the Crusaders.

=== Council of Palmarea ===
The nobility of Jerusalem welcomed the arrival of troops from Europe. A council to decide on the best target for the Crusaders took place on 24 June 1148, when the High Court of Jerusalem met with the recently arrived Crusaders from Europe at Palmarea near Acre, a major city of the Kingdom of Jerusalem.

The decision was made to attack Damascus—a former ally of the Kingdom of Jerusalem that had shifted its allegiance to that of the Zengids, and had attacked Bosra (an ally of Jerusalem) in 1147. Historians have long seen the decision to besiege Damascus rather than Edessa as "an act of inexplicable folly". Noting the tensions between Unur and the growing power of the Zangids, many historians have argued that it would have been better for the Crusaders to focus their energy against the Zangids. More recently, historians such as David Nicolle have defended the decision to attack Damascus, arguing that Damascus was the most powerful Muslim state in southern Syria, and that if the Christians held Damascus, they would have been in a better position to resist the rising power of Nur ad-Din. Since Unur was the weaker of the two Muslim rulers, it was believed that it was inevitable that Nur ad-Din would take Damascus sometime in the near future, and thus it seemed better for the Crusaders to hold that city rather than the Zangids. In July their armies assembled at Tiberias and marched to Damascus, around the Sea of Galilee by way of Banias. There were perhaps 50,000 troops in total.

=== Siege of Damascus ===
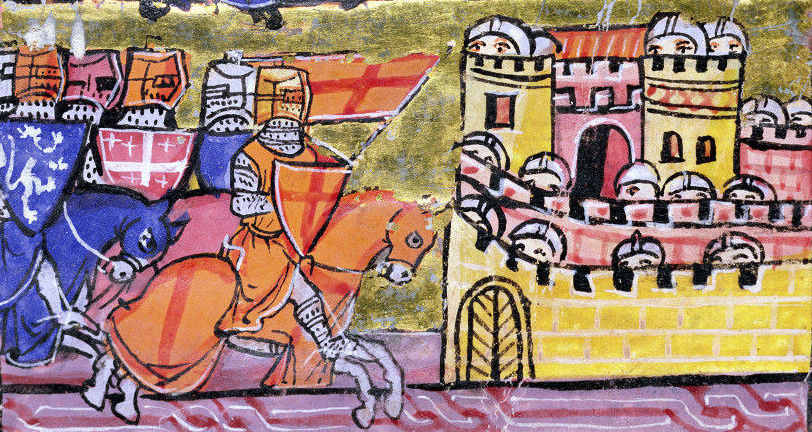
Siege of Damascus

The Crusaders decided to attack Damascus from the west, where orchards would provide them with a food supply. They arrived at Darayya on 23 July 1148. The following day, the Muslims were prepared for the attack and constantly attacked the army advancing through the orchards outside Damascus. The defenders had sought help from Sayf al-Din Ghazi I of Mosul and Nur ad-Din of Aleppo, who personally led an attack on the Crusader camp. The Crusaders were pushed back from the walls into the orchards, leaving them exposed to ambushes and guerrilla attacks.

According to William of Tyre, on 27 July the Crusaders decided to move to the plain on the eastern side of the city, which was less heavily fortified but had much less food and water. It was recorded by some that Unur had bribed the leaders to move to a less defensible position, and that Unur had promised to break off his alliance with Nur ad-Din if the Crusaders went home. Meanwhile, Nur ad-Din and Sayf al-Din had arrived. With Nur ad-Din in the field it was impossible for the Crusaders to return to their better position. The local Crusader lords refused to carry on with the siege, and the three kings had no choice but to abandon the city. First Conrad, then the rest of the army, decided to retreat to Jerusalem on 28 July, though for their entire retreat they were followed by Turkish archers harassing them.

== Aftermath ==
The Crusaders were victorious in the west, where they conquered several territories, including Lisbon, which would later become the capital of Portugal and thus the Portuguese Empire. In the east, each of the Christian forces felt betrayed by the other. A plan was made to attack Ascalon, and Conrad took his troops there, but no further help arrived, due to the lack of trust that had resulted from the failed siege. This mutual distrust would linger for a generation, to the ruin of the Christian kingdoms in the Holy Land. After quitting Ascalon, Conrad returned to Constantinople to further his alliance with Manuel. Louis remained behind in Jerusalem until 1149. The discord also extended to the marriage of Louis and Eleanor, which had been falling apart during the course of the crusade. In April 1149, Louis and Eleanor, who were barely on speaking terms by this time, pointedly boarded separate ships to take them back to France.

Back in Europe, Bernard of Clairvaux was humiliated by the defeat. Bernard considered it his duty to send an apology to the pope, and it is inserted in the second part of his Book of Consideration. There, he explains how the sins of the Crusaders were the cause of their misfortune and failures. When his attempt to call a new crusade failed, he tried to disassociate himself from the fiasco of the Second Crusade altogether.

The cultural impact of the Second Crusade was even greater in France, with many troubadours fascinated by the alleged affair between Eleanor and Raymond, which helped to feed the theme of courtly love. Unlike Conrad, the image of Louis was improved by the crusade with many of the French seeing him as a suffering pilgrim king who quietly bore God's punishments.

Relations between the Eastern Roman Empire and the French were badly damaged by the crusade. Louis and other French leaders openly accused the Manuel of colluding with Turkish attacks on them during the march across Anatolia. The memory of the Second Crusade was to colour French views of the Byzantines for the rest of the 12th and 13th centuries. Within the empire, the crusade was remembered as a triumph of diplomacy. In the eulogy for Manuel, Archbishop Eustathius of Thessalonica declared, "He was able to deal with his enemies with enviable skill, playing off one against the other with the aim of bringing peace and tranquility".

In the East the situation was much darker for the Christians. In the Holy Land, the Second Crusade had disastrous long-term consequences for Jerusalem. In 1149 Anur died and was succeeded by Abu Sa'id Mujir al-Din Abaq Ibn Muhammad as emir. The ra'is of Damascus and commander of the ahdath military Mu'ayad al-Dawhal Ibn al-Sufi feel that since his ahdath had played a major role in defeating the Second Crusade, he deserved a greater share of the power and within two months of Anur's death was leading a rebellion against Abaq. The in-fighting within Damascus was to lead to the end of the Burid state within five years. Damascus no longer trusted the Crusader kingdom and was taken by Nur ad-Din after a short siege in 1154.

Baldwin III finally seized Ascalon in 1153, which brought Egypt into the sphere of conflict. Jerusalem was able to make further advances into Egypt, briefly occupying Cairo in the 1160s. However, relations with the Byzantine Empire were mixed, and reinforcements from Europe were sparse after the disaster of the Second Crusade. King Amalric I of Jerusalem allied with the Byzantines and participated in a combined invasion of Egypt in 1169, but the expedition ultimately failed. In 1171, Saladin, nephew of one of Nur ad-Din's generals, was proclaimed Sultan of Egypt, uniting Egypt and Syria and completely surrounding the Crusader kingdom. Meanwhile, the Byzantine alliance ended with the death of Manuel in 1180, and in 1187 Jerusalem capitulated to Saladin. His forces then spread north to capture all but the capital cities of the Crusader states, precipitating the Third Crusade.
