= Battle of Mount Cadmus =

Conflict in the Second Crusade

- Part of the Second Crusade
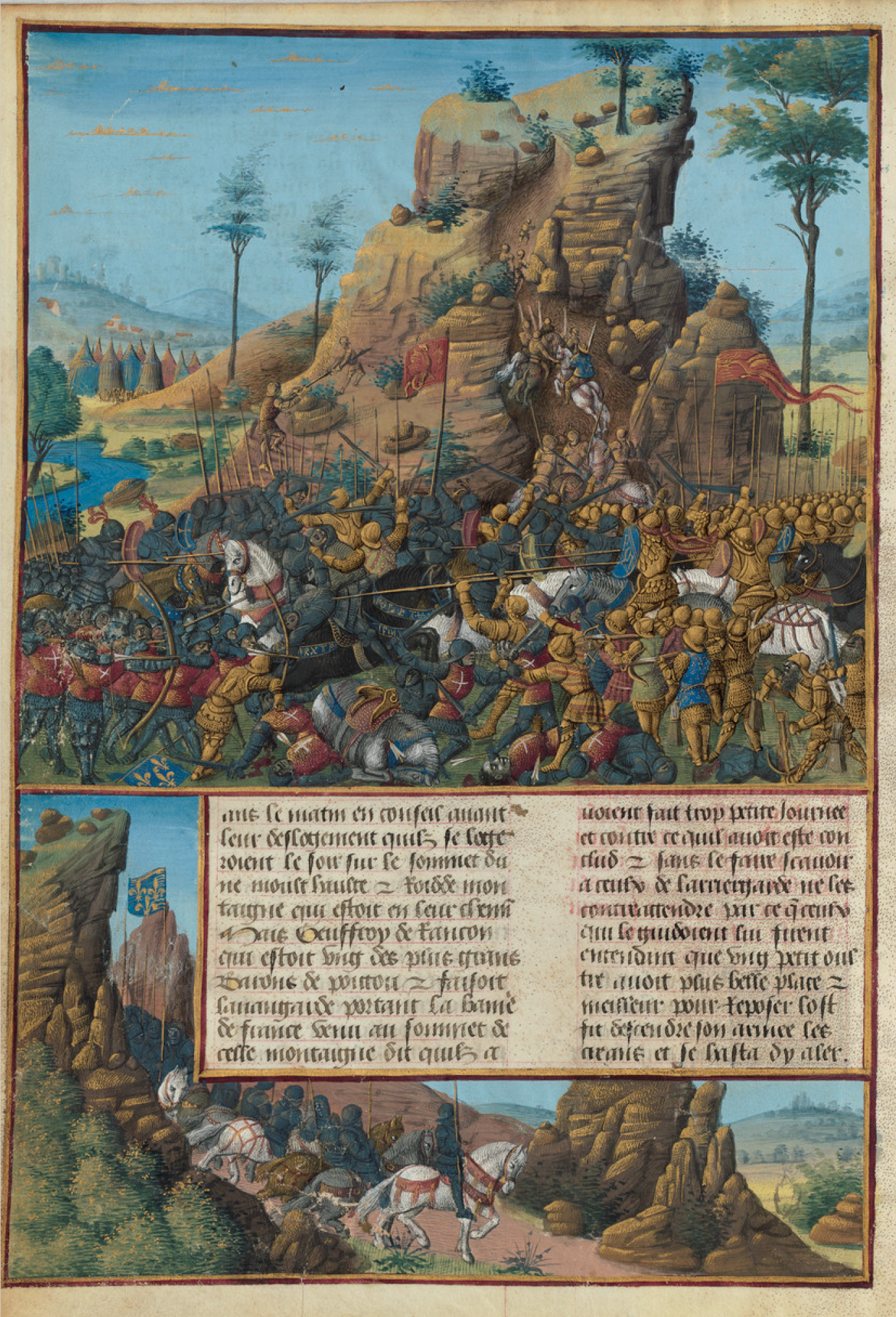
- From a copy of the Passages d'outremer (c. 1490)
Date	6 January 1148
Location	Pisidia (modern-day Turkey)
Result	Decisive Seljuk victory

Belligerents
Kingdom of France	Sultanate of Rum

Commanders and leaders
Louis VII; William de Warren †; Everard of Breteuil †; Gautier of Montjay †; Reynauld of Tours †; Itiers of Meingnac †; Manassas of Bulles †	Mesud I

Strength
Unknown	Unknown

Casualties and losses
Heavy casualties	Unknown

The Battle of Mount Cadmus took place near Laodicea at Chonae on 6 January 1148 during the Second Crusade. The French Crusader army, led by Louis VII of France, was defeated by the Seljuks of Rum.

== Background ==
The ill-disciplined Crusaders, especially those of the German contingent, had caused a number of incidents during their passage through the Balkans. Byzantine Emperor Manuel I Comnenus feared that the Crusaders would strengthen the Principality of Antioch, which he wanted to restore to his sovereignty, and also would weaken the Byzantine-German alliance against Roger II of Sicily. While Conrad III and Louis VII refused to pay homage to the Byzantine emperor in the autumn of 1147, they retained the Byzantine troops. Consequently, Roger seized Corfu and Cephalonia and plundered Corinth and Thebes.

The French and Germans decided to take separate routes. Conrad's army was defeated at the Battle of Dorylaeum 25 October 1147. The remnants of the army of Conrad were able to join the army of the king of France. The armies followed the path left by the First Crusaders' advance to Philadelphia in Lydia. In this city, the Germans were still exposed to attack and decided to return to Constantinople. Conrad, who had reconciled with Manuel, sailed to Acre alongside with the surviving members of his army using Byzantine ships. The troops of Louis VII followed the coast and then took the road to the east. The Seljuks waited on the banks of the river Meander, but the French defeated the attempted ambush at the Battle of the Meander, then marched to Laodicea, which they reached on 6 January, the day of the Epiphany. They then marched to the mountains that separate Phrygia from Pisidia.

== Battle ==
The vanguard, led by Geoffrey de Rancon, having navigated the pass around Mount Cadmus much faster than expected, ignored Louis' orders to camp at the summit of the pass, and instead headed to a supposedly better camp on the other side. Thus, the baggage train, lagging behind in the middle of the column, was completely unprotected as the rear-guard had not yet left camp, intending to tackle the pass the next day. The Turks, seeing the unprotected baggage train, closed in and attacked, causing heavy casualties. The French retreated to a narrow gorge, bordered on one side with precipices and crags on the other. Horses, men, and baggage were forced into the abyss during the ensuing panic. Hearing this, Louis rushed forward and bravely charged the enemy with only his immediate retenue - this provided some breathing room for the survivors in the baggage train, allowing them to struggle over the pass. However, many of Louis' retinue and guard were killed in this charge; the French had not been able to make full use of their cavalry charge thanks to the topography, and many horses were killed. Louis was able to escape the fray, using a tree root to climb onto a rock, fighting off multiple assailants until they gave up and left him alone, not recognising him as the French King.

At night, Louis took advantage of the darkness to find a horse and join the vanguard of his army, which had believed him to be dead. After the battle, Louis' army, which had suffered heavy losses, struggled into Attaleia on 20 January.
