= Siege of Antioch (1084–1085) =

- Part of the Byzantine–Seljuk wars
- Dominions of Philaretos Brachamios
Date	December 1084 – 12 January 1085
Location	Antioch
Result	Seljuk victory

Belligerents
Byzantine Empire	Seljuk Turks

Commanders and leaders
Philaretos Brachamios	Suleiman ibn Qutalmish

Strength
Unknown	300 cavalry + some infantry

Casualties and losses
Unknown	Unknown

The siege of Antioch was a military engagement between the Seljuks of Rum led by Sulieman ibn Qutalmish and the Byzantine garrison of Philaretos. The Seljuk with a small force managed to capture the city in late 1084 while the castle surrendered in early 1085.

== Background ==
After the defeat at the Battle of Manzikert, a large part of Asia Minor fell to the hands of the Seljuk Turks. The city of Antioch, however; remained under the Byzantines. Antioch's last two governors were Armenians. The last one was Philaretus, who had risen by his courage and ability to the rank of domesticus under the Byzantine emperor, Romanos IV Diogenes. The Seljuks launched an expedition to capture the city.

Various accounts give the reason why the Seljuks attacked. Matthew of Edessa claims the city was weak and poorly defended so they decided to attack. The Byzantine historian, Anna Komnene claimed that Philaretus converted to Islam and his son Basrama was against this, however, he was imprisoned and ironically asked the Seljuks for help. Ibn al-Athir agrees with this and claims that Philaretus mistreated the inhabitants and had his son imprisoned so they asked for help.

== Siege ==
Later in December 1084, the Seljuk ruler of Nicaea, Suleiman ibn Qutalmish, left with a small army of 300 cavalry and some infantry. Suleiman sailed to the gulf of Issus and landed there. He made his way in the night through the stony Ridges. Eventually, the Seljuks arrived at Antioch at night. The Seljuks then had the spears attached to ropes and threw the spears at the battlement of the walls. Some of the Seljuks then climbed up and opened the St. Paul's Gate. This entry involved defection from some guards. The Inhabitants were unaware of what was happening until they were alerted by one cry of a Seljuk.

Hearing this the inhabitants began fleeing in terror, some jumped over the walls and others to the citadel. Some attempted to resist but were defeated. A general amnesty was proclaimed; the plunder seized after the first irruption was restored and the Seljuks allowed the inhabitants to return home unmolested. The Seljuks avoided a massacre. Some of Philaretus's men who retreated to the citadel held out against the Seljuks. On January 12 of the next year, the garrison launched an attack but was defeated, forcing them to surrender. Everyone in the citadel was spared.

== Sources ==
- Giorgi, Andrea U. De; Eger, A. Asa (2021-05-30). Antioch: A History. Routledge. ISBN 978-1-317-54041-0.
- Bouchier, Edmund Spenser (1921). A Short History of Antioch: 300 B. C.-A. D. 1268. B. Blackwell. ISBN 978-0-598-84046-2. Archived from the original on 2008-04-15.
- al-Athīr, ʻIzz al-Dīn Ibn (2002). The Annals of the Saljuq Turks: Selections from Al-Kāmil Fīʻl-Taʻrīkh of ʻIzz Al-Dīn Ibn Al-Athīr. Psychology Press. ISBN 978-0-7007-1576-3.
