= Battle of Ain Salm =

Battle between the Seljuks of Syria and Anatolia

Battle of Aynu Seylem
Date	5 June 1086
Location	Near Aleppo, Syria
Result	Seljuk/Damascene victory

Belligerents
Seljuk Empire; Emirate of Damascus; Artuqid Beylik	Sultanate of Rûm; Beylik of Çubukoğulları

Commanders and leaders
Tutush; Artuk Beg	Suleiman ibn Qutalmish †; Kilij Arslan I (POW); Kulan Arslan (POW); Çubuk Bey

The battle of Ain Salm was a battle between the forces of Tutush, the Seljuk ruler of Syria and brother of the Seljuk sultan Malik Shah, and Suleiman ibn Qutalmish, the Seljuk ruler of Anatolia in June 1086 close to the city of Aleppo.

== Background ==
In 1081, Suleiman had come to an agreement with Emperor Alexios I Komnenos about the division of Western Anatolia between their two powers which allowed Alexios to focus on the Norman invasion of the Balkans and Suleiman to consolidate his power and expand into Eastern Turkey and Syria. In 1083, Suleiman had taken Tarsus and he proceeded to conquer Antioch in December 1084. This brought him into conflict with the Uqaylid ruler of the neighbouring city of Aleppo, Muslim ibn Quraysh, and the latter was defeated and slain in a battle in June 1085. Suleiman attempted to capture Aleppo the same year but failed. Tutush, the Seljuk ruler of Syria, felt threatened by Suleiman's action who was additionally a cousin and thus a possible threat to the throne. Although he did not control Aleppo directly, the city was in his sphere of influence.

When Suleiman tried to conquer Aleppo the following year again, Tutush responded to the calls for help of Aleppo's ruler and came with an army against Suleiman.

== Battle ==
The two armies met at Ayn Saylam and Süleiman's all-out attack was routed by Turkmens under Artuk Beg. It seems that Süleiman was abandoned by a number of his closest companions as Tutush succeeded in winning them over before the battle.

== Aftermath ==
In the aftermath, Suleiman was killed. (Note: Osman Basan states it is thought Suleiman committed suicide. Ibn al-Athir gives two conflicting accounts: that Suleiman committed suicide or was struck in the face with an arrow and died. Komnena just states Suleiman committed suicide.) It was only in late 1092 after Malik Shah's death that Kilic Arslan could escape and attempt to reclaim his father's dominion which had started to fracture into various principalities under independent warlords such as Tzachas, Elchanes and Poulchanes.

Tutush took briefly control of Aleppo but then retreated. While it has been suggested that he fled the approach of his brother Malik Shah in fear of retribution for killing their relative, it is more likely that he went to relieve his capital Damascus which had come under siege by the Fatimids.

== Sources ==
=== Primary sources ===
- Ibn al-Athir (2002). The Annals of the Saljuq Turks. Translated by Richards, D.S. Routledge.
- Komnena, Anna. "The Alexiad". Medieval Sourcebook. Fordham University.

=== Secondary sources ===
- Basan, Osman Aziz (2010). The Great Seljuqs: A History. Routledge. ISBN 1136953930.
- Beihammer, Alexander Daniel (2017). Byzantium and the Emergence of Muslim Turkish Anatolia, ca. 1040–1130. Routledge. ISBN 978-1-138-22959-4.
- Mecit, Songul (2011). "Kingship and Ideology under the Rum Seljuqs". In Lange, Christian; Mecit, Songul (eds.). The Seljuqs: Politics, Society and Culture. Edinburgh University Press.
- Grousset, René (1970). The Empire of the Steppes: A History of Central Asia. Translated by Walford, Naomi. Rutgers University Press.
- Peacock, Andrew (2015). The Great Seljuk Empire. Edinburgh University Press.
