= Battles of Heraclea =

- Part of the Crusades
Date	1101
Location	Konya
Result	Overall Turkish victory

Belligerents
Sultanate of Rum; Danishmend	Kingdom of France; Duchy of Burgundy; County of Blois; County of Nevers; County of Vermandois; Duchy of Aquitaine; Holy Roman Empire; Kingdom of Italy (Lombardy); Palatine County of Burgundy; Duchy of Bavaria; Margraviate of Austria

Commanders and leaders
Kilij Arslan I	William II, Count of Nevers; William IX, Duke of Aquitaine

Strength
20,000 or 25,000	40,000–60,000

Casualties and losses
Minimal	Heavy

The battles of Heraclea were a series of battles fought during the Crusade of 1101 between Crusaders led by William II, Count of Nevers and the Sultanate of Rum led by Kilij Arslan I. Both battles resulted in a Turkish victory.

The French also who constituted the second group of the Crusade of 1101, could not escape the wrath of Sultan Kilij Arslan I. William II, Count of Nevers who arrived in Constantinople in June 1101, moved fast to Ankara and then to Konya. His army suffered Turkish raids on the way. When they arrived the army were terrified by the Turks.

The French and Germans who headed east under the command of William II arrived at Constantinople early June 1101, where they headed to Konya through Nicomedia-Nicaea entering Seljuk lands near Aksehir. As Kilij Arslan had heard of their marching, they evacuated cities, including Konya and destroyed the fields and water sources. Kilij Arslan and Gazi Gümüshtigin waited for them to weaken. When they saw the Crusaders running to a river, Kilij Arslan attacked and achieved a Turkish victory.
