= Odo of Deuil =

Historian and participant in the Second Crusade

Odo of Deuil (1110 – 18 April 1162), his first name also spelled Odon, Eude or Eudes, was a French historian of and participant in the Second Crusade (1147–1149).

Born at Deuil to a modest family, he became a monk and was a confidant of Suger, abbot of Saint-Denis. He took part in the Second Crusade in 1147, and served as the chaplain of Louis VII on the expedition.

His narrative of the Crusade is entitled De profectione Ludovici VII in Orientem (On Louis VII's journey to the East), which relates the progress of the crusade from France to Antioch. It was written so that Suger could compose a history of Louis' life. Eudes explains the failure of the crusade in terms of human action rather than as the will of God, in contrast to the reasoning of Otto of Freising. His aims were to glorify Louis, but also to provide a guide for future crusaders so that the mistakes of the Second Crusade would not be repeated.

Eudes blamed the Byzantine Empire under Manuel Comnenus for the downfall of the crusade. Eudes' prejudice against Byzantium led historian Steven Runciman to describe Eudes as "hysterically anti-Greek." However, Professor Jonathan Phillips has recently argued that Eudes' view of Byzantium was possibly rooted in ideological differences which minor skirmishes between the crusaders and Greeks had brought to the fore. His prejudice should also be set against the experience of Conrad III of Germany, who wrote that Manuel treated him as a "brother."

Eudes' account ends with the remnant of the crusade arriving at Antioch, and so does not include a description of the Siege of Damascus in 1148.

He returned to France and became abbot of Saint-Denis in 1151.

== Sources ==
- Odo of Deuil, De profectione Ludovici VII in Orientem, tr. V.G. Berry (New York: W.W. Norton and Co., 1948).
- J. Phillips, "Odo of Deuil's De profectione Ludovici VII in Orientem as a source for the Second Crusade", in M. Bull et al. (eds), The Experience of Crusading, 2 Vols (Cambridge: Cambridge University Press, 2003), 1.80-95.
- S. Runciman, A History of the Crusades, 3 Vols (London: Cambridge University Press, 1951-4).
