= Suleiman ibn Qutalmish =

Founder of the Sultanate of Rum

Suleiman I
- Shah; Ghazi; Sultan
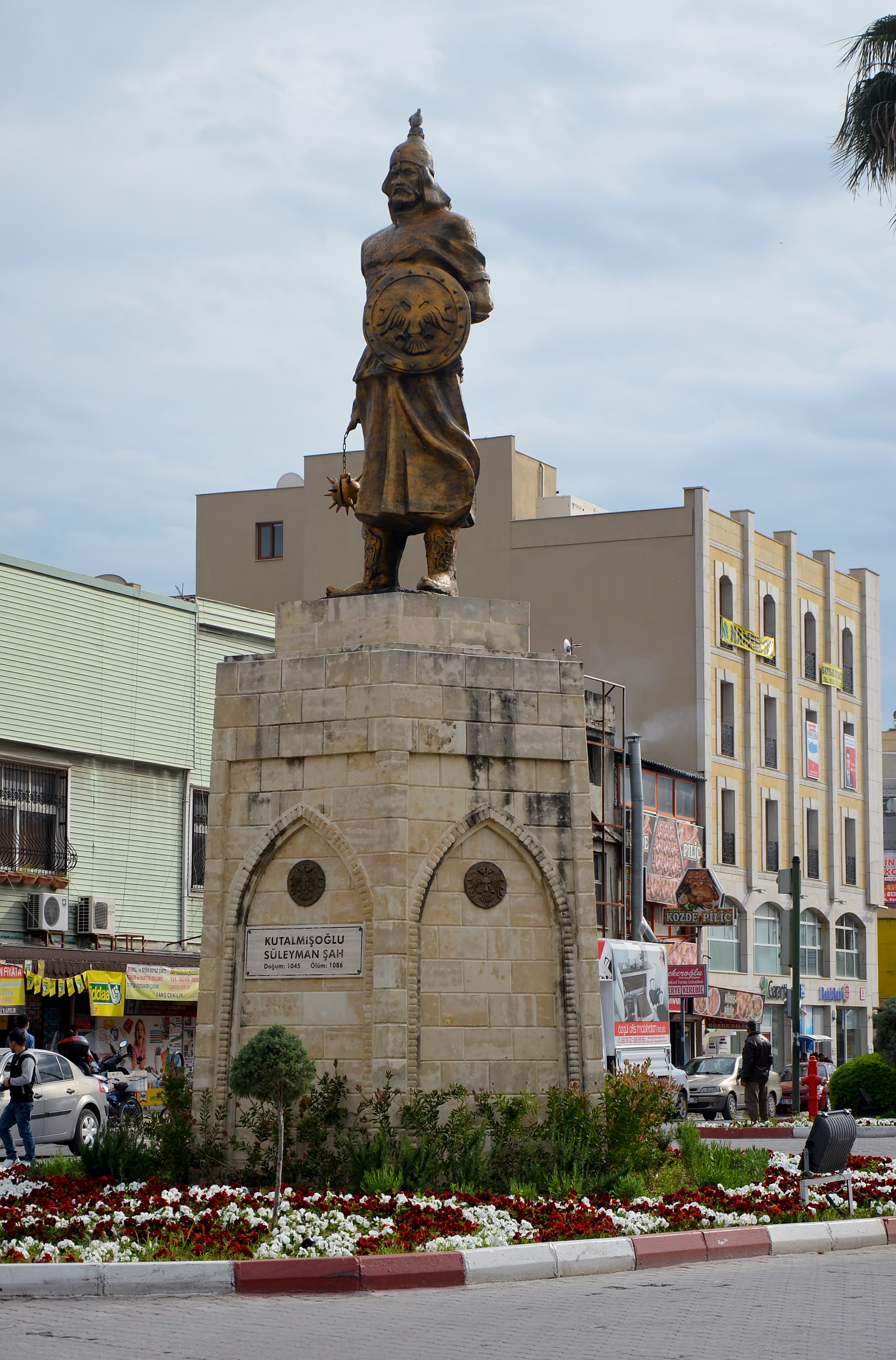
- Kutalmışoğlu Suleiman monument in Tarsus, Mersin

Sultan of Rum
- Reign: 1077–1086
- Predecessor: Title established
- Successor: Abu'l-Qasim; Kilij Arslan I
- Born: 1041
- Died: 1086 (aged 45); Near Antioch (modern-day Antakya, Hatay, Turkey)
- Consort: Seljuka Khatun
- Issue: Kilij Arslan I
- House: Seljuk
- Father: Qutalmish
- Religion: Sunni Islam

Suleiman Shah I ibn Qutalmish (Turkish: Kutalmışoğlu Süleyman Şah; Old Anatolian Turkish: سُلَیمانشاہ بن قُتَلمِش; Persian: سلیمان بن قتلمش) founded an independent Seljuk Turkish state in Anatolia and ruled as Seljuk Sultan of Rûm from 1077 until his death in 1086.

== Life ==
Suleiman was the son of Qutalmish, who had struggled unsuccessfully against his cousin Alp Arslan for the throne of the Great Seljuk Empire. When Qutalmish died in 1064, Suleiman fled with his three brothers into the Taurus Mountains and there sought refuge with Turkoman tribes living beyond the borders of the empire. Alp Arslan responded by launching a series of punitive expeditions against them. Of the four brothers, Suleiman alone with his brother Mansur survived the raids and was able to consolidate his leadership of the Turkomans living in the Taurus Mountains.

=== Founding his realm ===
According to the chronicler Al-Azimi, Suleiman captured Nicaea in 1075. Based on this date, some historians accepted that the Anatolian Seljuk State was founded on this date, and others between 1078-1081. Thereupon, sultan Malik-Shah I recognized him as a ruler of Rum, while the Abbasid caliph Al-Qa'im sent him a firman (edict) and a khalat for his success. There is no single record of him minting coins and delivering a khutbah (sermon) in his own name. For this reason, it can be said that he was still subject to the Great Seljuk Empire. As a matter of fact, there are clear statements in various sources about his subjection to Malik-Shah I.

In 1078, the Byzantine emperor Michael VII sought the help of Suleiman against Nicephorus Botaneiates, the commander of the Anatolic Theme, who had challenged the emperor for the throne. Suleiman intercepted Botaneiates' small force between Cotyaeum and Nicaea, whereupon the usurper persuaded Suleiman and Mansur to join his rebellion by offering him incentives superior to those of the emperor. Nicephorus' bid for power was successful, and in return for their support, Suleiman's Turkmen were allowed to settle on the Asiatic side of the Bosphorus, near Constantinople itself. Two years later, Suleiman lent his support to another pretender, Nicephorus Melissenus. It was the latter Nicephorus who opened the gates of Nicaea to the Turkmen, allowing Suleiman to establish a permanent base. All Bithynia was soon under Suleiman's control, a circumstance which allowed him to restrict communication between Constantinople and the former Byzantine subjects in Anatolia.

In 1084, Suleiman left Nicaea, leaving his kinsman Abu'l Qasim in charge. That same year, he captured Antakya from the Byzantine governor, Philaretos Brachamios. Following Suleiman's capture of Antakya, the Uqaylid Muslim ibn Quraysh demanded tribute. Suleiman refused, which was followed by border raids by both sides. In 1085, Muslim ibn Quraysh marched an army to besiege Antakya, Suleiman intercepted him and defeated Muslim after the latter's army suffered the defection of Turkmen under the command of Cubuk bey.

=== His death ===
In 1086, Suleiman, seeking to expand his dominion, placed Aleppo under siege and demanded its surrender. The emir of Aleppo sent a message to Tutush I, the Seljuk ruler of Syria, stating he would hand the city over to him. Suleiman, hearing of the approach of Tutush's forces, raised the siege and marched to meet him. In the battle of Ain Salm near Aleppo, Suleiman attacked Tutush but his forces fled before Tutush's army under Artuk Bey and Suleiman was killed. (Note: Ibn al-Athir gives two conflicting accounts: that Suleiman committed suicide or was struck in the face with an arrow and died. Komnena states Suleiman committed suicide during the battle.)

Malik-Shah marched to Antakya, where Suleiman's vizier surrendered both the city and Suleiman's son, Kilij Arslan I. Malik Shah transferred Kilij to Isfahan as a hostage.

Upon the death of Malik-Shah I, Kilij Arslan I re-established the Sultanate of Rûm.

== Sources ==
- Basan, Osman Aziz (2010). The Great Seljuqs: A History. Routledge. ISBN 978-1136953934.
- Cahen, Claude (1968). Pre-Ottoman Turkey: a general survey of the material and spiritual culture and history c. 1071–1330. Translated by Jones-Williams, J. Taplinger.
- Grousset, René (1970). The Empire of the Steppes: A History of Central Asia. Translated by Walford, Naomi. Rutgers University Press.
- Mecit, Songul (2011). "Kingship and Ideology under the Rum Seljuqs". In Lange, Christian; Mecit, Songul (eds.). The Seljuqs: Politics, Society and Culture. Edinburgh University Press.
- Ibn al-Athir (2002). The Annals of the Saljuq Turks. Translated by Richards, D.S. Routledge.
- Komnena, Anna. "The Alexiad". Medieval Sourcebook. Fordham University.
- Leiser, Gary (2010). "The Turks in Anatolia before the Ottomans". In Fierro, Maribel (ed.). The New Cambridge History of Islam. Vol. 2: The Western Islamic World Eleventh to Eighteenth Centuries. Cambridge University Press. pp. 301–312.
- Ostrogorsky, George (1969). History of the Byzantine State. Translated by Hussey, Joan. Rutgers University Press.
- Peacock, Andrew (2013). The Seljuks of Anatolia: Court and Society in the Medieval Middle East. I.B. Tauris.
- Peacock, Andrew (2015). The Great Seljuk Empire. Edinburgh University Press.
- Vryonis, Speros (1971). The Decline of Medieval Hellenism in Asia Minor and the Process of Islamization from the Eleventh through the Fifteenth Century. University of California Press.

Preceded by Qutalmish	Sultan of Rûm; 1077–1086	Succeeded by Kilij Arslan I
