= Battle of Dorylaeum (1147) =

Part of the Second Crusade

Coordinates: 39°47′N 30°31′E

- Part of the Second Crusade
- Combat in the 2nd Crusade, Estoire d'Eracles
Date	October 1147
Location	Dorylaeum (modern-day Eskişehir, Turkey)
Result	Seljuk victory

Belligerents
Holy Roman Empire	Sultanate of Rum

Commanders and leaders
Conrad III (WIA)	Mesud I

Strength
Unknown	Unknown

Casualties and losses
Claims are of up to 90% of army killed, missing or captured (90% is an unreliable figure - see text), analysis of contemporary figures indicate a maximum of 63% deaths for the Crusade as a whole. (Note: The author states that 9/10ths of the German army was lost, but the primary sources he cites do not give any casualty figures.) (Note: Conrad III injured. Analysis of the fate of named participants suggest a casualty rate of 63% at most.)	Unknown

The second Battle of Dorylaeum took place near Dorylaeum in October 1147 during the Second Crusade. The battle consisted of a series of encounters over several days. The German Crusader forces of Conrad III were defeated by the Seljuk Turks led by Sultan Mesud I.

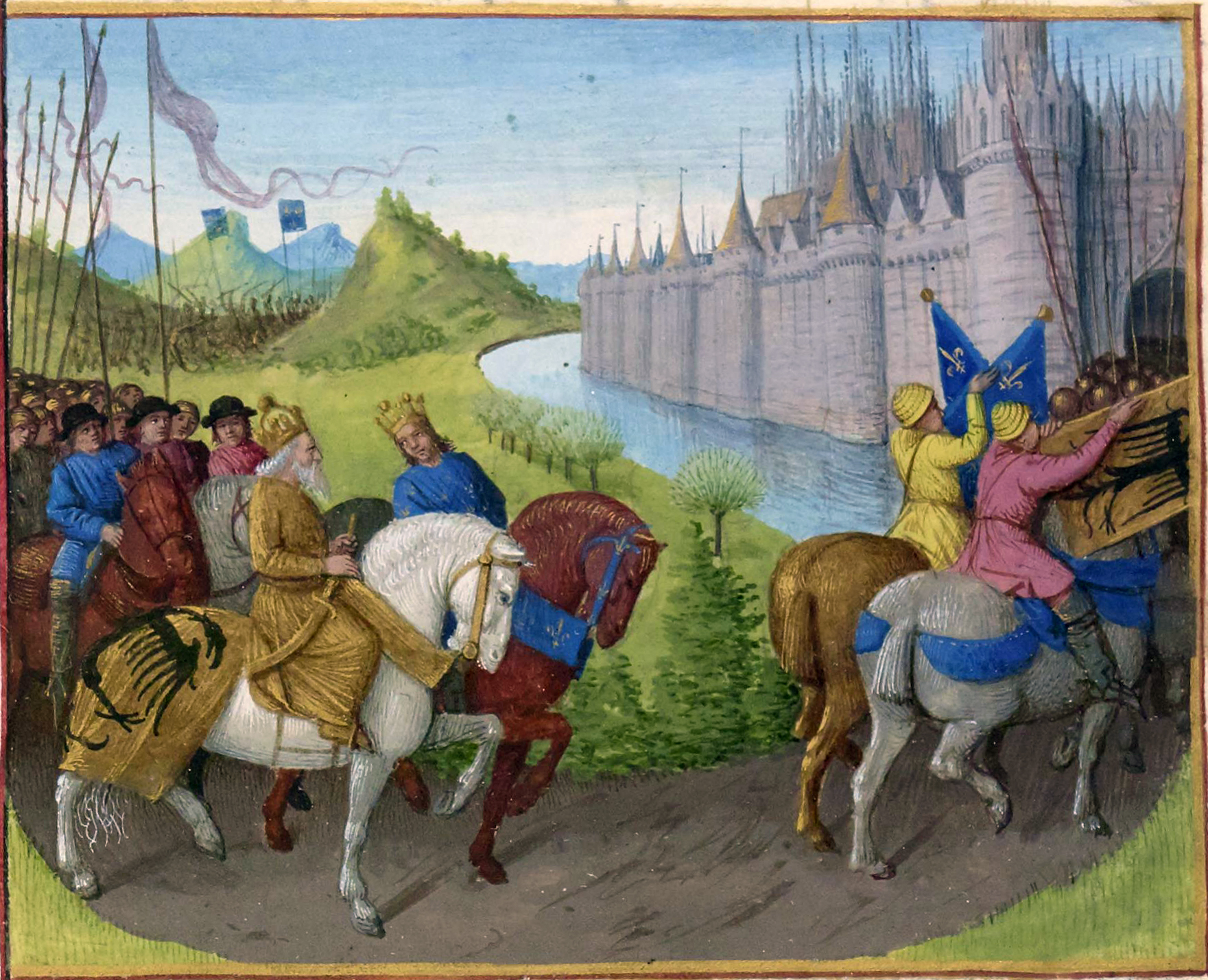
Arrival of the Second Crusade before Constantinople, portrayed in Jean Fouquet's painting from around 1455–1460, Arrivée des croisés à Constantinople.

== Background ==
Following escalating friction between the Byzantine Empire and the German Crusader army, including armed clashes, the Germans were ferried from the environs of Constantinople to the Asiatic shores of the Bosporus. With inadequate supplies, the Crusaders moved to the interior of Anatolia, intending to take an overland route to the Holy Land.

== Running battle ==
As the Crusaders crossed into the Anatolian plateau they entered an area of debatable frontier districts between the Byzantines and Seljuk Turks. Once beyond effective Byzantine control, the German army came under harassing attacks from the Turks, who excelled at such tactics. The poorer and less well-supplied infantry of the Crusader army were the most vulnerable to hit-and-run horse archer attack and began to take casualties and lose men to capture. The area through which the Crusaders were marching was largely barren and arid; therefore the army could not augment its supplies and was troubled by thirst.

When the Germans were about three days march beyond Dorylaeum, the nobility requested that the army turn back and regroup. As the Crusaders began their retreat, on 25 October the Turkish attacks intensified, and order broke down, the retreat then became a rout with heavy casualties. Conrad was wounded by arrows during the rout. The Crusaders lost virtually all of their baggage and, according to the Syriac Chronicle, "The Turks grew rich for they had taken gold and silver like pebbles with no end."

== Aftermath ==
On regaining lands under firm Byzantine control Turkish attacks ceased. The failure of the Crusaders was partly blamed on Byzantine treachery by the contemporary chronicler William of Tyre; the Greek guides and local population were accused of being in league with the Seljuks. However, convincing evidence or motivation for this scenario is lacking, though the Byzantine Emperor Manuel I had hurriedly arranged a peace treaty with the Seljuk sultan. German losses are difficult to estimate, William of Tyre stating that only a remnant of the army was left. Of the 113 named men in the army, 22 are recorded to have died on the crusade, 42 survived and 49 were unaccounted for. However, the named men would have been of the knightly and noble class, who being better armoured and provisioned than the infantry were more likely to survive. The detailed fate of a significant proportion of the German army shows that the notion of it being completely destroyed near Dorylaeum is untenable. Nicolle states that the 'professional core' of Conrad's army, i.e. the knights and other cavalry, remained largely intact, though with shaken morale.

The Germans subsequently joined forces with the French Crusaders, led by Louis VII of France, at Nicaea before proceeding along the coastal route around western Anatolia. The joint forces came under renewed Seljuk attack, and Conrad and the elite of his force took ship at Ephesus. Conrad returned by sea to Constantinople, where he was reconciled with the Byzantine emperor. The remainder of the German crusaders, in company with the French, moved on to Attalia, where some were shipped to Antioch. Of those who attempted the overland route to Antioch there is no accurate record of the number of survivors. Manuel later provided ships to take Conrad and his entourage to Palestine. The Second Crusade eventually failed in its attempt to take the city of Damascus.

The anonymous German author of Annales Herbipolenses, a native of Würzburg, speaks of meeting many returned soldiers, presumably of the wealthier section of the army. They had been captured by the Turks, and had been ransomed by, or through the mediation of, the Armenians of Cilicia.

== Bibliography ==
- Altan, Ebru (2015). Haçlı Seferleri Tarihi(History of the crusades (PDF) (in Turkish). İstanbul ÜNİVERSİTESİ AÇIK ve Uzaktan EĞİTİM FAKÜLTESİ. p. 120.
- Nicolle, David (2009). The Second Crusade, 1148: Disaster Outside Damascus. Campaign. Vol. 204. Botley, Oxford; New York: Osprey Publishing. ISBN 978-1-84603-354-4.
- Phillips, J. (2008). The Second Crusade: Extending the Frontiers of Christendom. Yale University Press.
- Runciman, S. (1952). A History of the Crusades. Vol. II: The Kingdom of Jerusalem and the Frankish East, 1100–1187. Cambridge University Press.
