= Chronology of the Crusades, 1095–1187 =

This chronology presents the timeline of the Crusades from the beginning of the First Crusade in 1095 to the fall of Jerusalem in 1187. This is keyed towards the major events of the Crusades to the Holy Land, but also includes those of the Reconquista and Northern Crusades as well as the Byzantine-Seljuk wars.

== The growth of Islam ==
The history of the Crusades begins with the advent of Christian pilgrimage to the Holy Land combined with the rise of Islam and its subsequent conquest of Jerusalem.

- 326. Saint Helena, mother of Constantine the Great, travels to the Holy Land. She returns with Holy relics and begins a tradition of Christian pilgrimage.
- After 334. The Pilgrim of Bordeaux writes of his journey to the Holy Land in Itinerarium Burdigalense.
- November 636. The Siege of Jerusalem begins as part of the Muslim conquest of the Levant. The city surrenders in 637, remaining under Muslim rule until 1099.
- 711. The Muslim conquest of Spain begins.

Al-Andalus at its greatest extent

- 718. Pelagius of Asturias defeats the Moors at the Battle of Covadonga, beginning the Reconquista. (Note: See Chronology of the Reconquista for complete details.) He later founds the Kingdom of Asturias. (Note: Pelagius of Asturias was the first king of Asturias whose reign began in 714.)
- 719. Moorish occupation of al-Andalus reaches its largest extent in Iberia.
- 10 October 732. Charles Martel defeats the Moorish forces led by Abd al-Rahman at the Battle of Tours.
- 25 January 750. The Umayyads are defeated at the Battle of the Zab, leading to the Abbasid Revolution. The Abbasid Caliphate assumes control of the Holy Land. (Note: al-Saffāḥ was the first of the Abbasid caliphs.)
- 777. Charlemagne and Harun al-Rashid pursue an Abbasid–Carolingian alliance.
- 15 August 778. A contingent of Basques ambush Carolingian forces at the first Battle of Roncevaux Pass.
- Before 787. Saint Willibald writes of his travels to the Holy Land.
- 25 July 812. During the reign of Alfonso II of Asturias, Bishop Theodemir of Iria finds the remains of St. James the Greater. The site later is known as Santiago de Compostela.
- 846. In the Arab raid against Rome, marauding Muslims from Ifriqiya sacked the outskirts of the city.
- 865. Frankish monk Bernard the Pilgrim writes his Itinerarium of Bernard the Wise, an account of his travels to the Holy Land.
- 27 August 909. The Fatimid Caliphate is established in Egypt. (Note: Abd Allah al-Mahdi Billah was the first of the Fatimid caliphs.)
- 910. The Kingdom of León is founded under Garcia I of León. (Note: Garcia I of León is regarded as the first king of León, beginning in 910.)
- 16 January 929. The Caliphate of Córdoba established under Abd ar-Rahman III. (Note: Abd al-Rahman III was the first caliph of Córdoba, beginning in 929.)
- 16 August 935. Egyptian Muslims conduct a raid on the Ligurian coast, culminating in the Fatimid sack of Genoa.
- May 965. The Muslim conquest of Sicily is completed with the successful Siege of Rometta against the Byzantines.
- 969. The Fatimids take control of Jerusalem.
- 960–990. Christian churches are established among the West Slavs, Danes, Poles and Russians.
- 974–975. The Syrian Campaigns of Byzantine Emperor John I Tzimiskes fail to take Jerusalem.
- 978–997. Almanzor becomes chamberlain of the Caliphate of Córdoba and begins his campaigns against the Christians. This leads to the Sack of Barcelona (in 985) and the destruction of Santiago de Compostela (in 997).
- 983. The Wends participate in the Slavic Revolt of 983 against the Holy Roman Empire under Otto the Great.
- 997. St. Adalbert of Prague is martyred in Prussia.

== Origins of the Crusades ==
Origins of the Crusades are traceable to the combination of increased popularity of Christian pilgrimage and aggressive behavior of the dominant Muslim populations of Fatimids in Egypt and the Seljuk Turks in the Levant.

1000

- 29 July. Almanzor defeats Castile at the Battle of Cervera.
- (Date unknown). The Archdiocese of Gniezno is founded in Poland.

1009

- 27 September. Fatimid caliph al-Hakim orders the destruction of the Church of the Holy Sepulchre in Jerusalem.

1015

- (Date unknown). Mujahid al-Amiri of Dénia seizes control of the Balearic Islands.

1018

- (Date unknown). The Byzantines defeat the Lombards at the Battle of Cannae.

1022

- (Date unknown). The Orléans heresy that became the Cathars are dealt with at the Council of Orléans. (Note: The Cathars were eventually suppressed in the early 13th century after the Albigensian Crusade.)

1029

- 12 May. The Fatimids defeat a coalition of Syrian Bedouin tribes at the Battle of al-Uqhuwana, establishing control over the Bilad al-Sham, including Palestine, under the governor Anushtakin al-Duzbari.

1035

- February. The Kingdom of Aragon is founded under Ramiro I of Aragon. (Note: Ramiro I of Aragon was the first king of Aragon beginning in 1035.)

1037

- (Date unknown). The Seljuk Empire is founded by the brothers Tughril Beg and Chaghri Beg.
- (Date unknown). The Kingdom of Castile founded under Sancho II of Castile and León. (Note: Sancho II of Castile and León, nicknamed "the Strong," was the first king of Castile, beginning in 1065.)

1040

- Not earlier than. The 12th-century work The Song of Roland is written, based on the Battle of Roncevaux Pass and the exploits of the legendary Frankish military leader Roland.

1045

- (Date unknown, as late as 1050). The cathedrals of Holy Wisdom, the Cathedral of St. Sophia in Novgorod and Saint Sophia Cathedral in Polotsk, are built.

1046

- (Date unknown). A Byzantine army under the command of Liparit IV of Kldekari is defeated by a Seljuk force led by Qutalmish at the Battle of Ganja in Azerbaijan. Ganja was followed by another Seljuk victory at the Battle of Vaspurakan.

1048

- 18 September. The Seljuks under Ibrahim Inal are defeated by a Byzantine–Georgian army at the Battle of Kapetron. The Georgian general Liparit IV of Kldekari was taken prisoner.

1054

- 16 July. The East–West Schism splits the Catholic and Eastern Orthodox churches.
- (Date unknown). Tughril Beg is unsuccessful in his Siege of Manzikert.

1055

- December. Seljuk leader Tughril Beg conquers Baghdad.

1061

- May. The Norman conquest of Sicily begins under Robert Guiscard.
- 30 September. Alexander II is elected pope.

1063

- June. A Norman expeditionary force under Roger de Hauteville defeats a Muslim alliance from the Emirate of Sicily and the Banu Ziri at the Battle of Cerami.
- 1 October. Alp Arslan becomes sultan of the Seljuk Empire. (Note: Alp Arslan was the second sultan of the Seljuk Empire, succeeding his uncle Tughril Beg in 1063.)

1064

- 9 July. Ferdinand I of León captures the Portuguese city of Coimbra from the Moors after the first Siege of Coimbra.
- Summer. Alexander II sanctions the Crusade of Barbastro against the Muslim Taifa of Lérida.
- 16 August. Alp Arslan and Nizam al-Mulk capture the Byzantine city after the 25-day Siege of Ani.
- (Date unknown). Gunther of Bamberg leads the Great German Pilgrimage of 1064–1065 to the Holy Land.

1066

- 10 November. Bishop John Scotus is killed during a Wendish revolt against Christianity.
- 30 December. Much of the Jewish population of the city is killed in the 1066 Granada massacre.

1067

- (Date unknown). The city of Caesarea was sacked and its Cathedral of St. Basil desecrated by Alp Arslan.

1068

- 1 January. Romanos IV Diogenes marries empress Eudokia and becomes Byzantine emperor.

1069

- (Date unknown). Romanos IV Diogenes repels the Seljuks at the Siege of Iconium. He then begins his Campaign of 1069.

1070

- (Approximate). A hospital is opened in Jerusalem under the Benedictine Blessed Gerard which later forms the basis of the Knights Hospitaller, the Order of the Hospital of St. John of Jerusalem.
- (Date unknown). The Seljuks defeat Byzantium at the Battle of Sebastia.
- (Date unknown). Adam of Bremen writes his chronicle Gesta Hammaburgensis ecclesiae pontificum (Deeds of Bishops of the Hamburg Church).

1071

- 19 February. García II of Galicia declares himself count of Portugal after his victory at the Battle of Pedroso but is later overthrown by his brothers Sancho II of Castile and León and Alfonso VI of León and Castile. Galacia is later divided among Portugal and León.
- 15 April. Robert Guiscard successfully concludes the three-year Siege of Bari against the major stronghold of Bari in the Byzantine Empire.
- 26 August. The Seljuk Turks defeat the Byzantines at the decisive Battle of Manzikert. Emperor Romanos IV Diogenes is captured.
- 1 October. Michael VII Doukas ousts Romanos IV and becomes emperor.
- Later. Danishmend Gazi founds the Turkoman beylik of Danishmendids in central Anatolia.
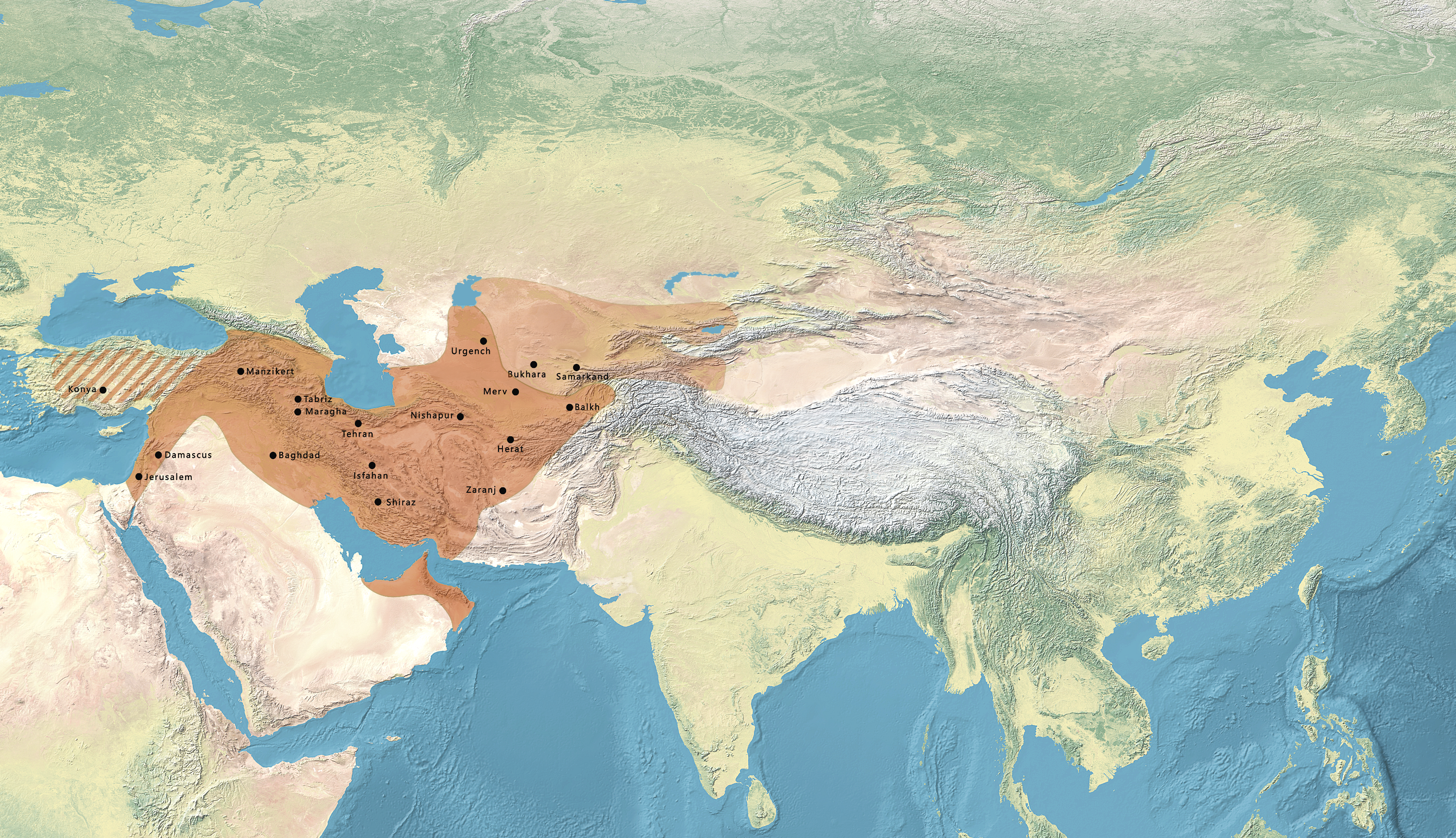
The Seljuk Empire and the Sultanate of Rûm in the late 11th century.

1072

- Early January. In an internecine battle among Christian kingdoms, Sancho II of Castile and León defeats Alfonso VI of León at the Battle of Golpejera. After an initial setback, El Cid rallied the Castilians to victory.
- 15 December. Vizier Nizam al-Mulk becomes the de facto ruler of the Seljuks after the assassination of Alp Arslan. He served under the under Arslan's 17-year-old son, sultan Malik-Shah I.

1073

- 22 April. Gregory VII is elected pope.
- (Date unknown). Seljuk leader Atsiz ibn Uvaq captures Jerusalem. He later becomes emir of Damascus.
- (Date unknown). The Seljuks defeat the Byzantines at the Battle of Caesarea (1073).

1074

- 1 March. Gregory VII begins planning an expedition to aid Eastern Christians.

1077

- (Date unknown) The Seljuk Sultanate of Rûm is established under Suleiman ibn Qutalmish.

1078

- (Date unknown). The forces of Michael VII Doukas under future emperor Alexios I Komnenos suppress a rebellion at the Battle of Kalavrye.

1079

- October. Atsiz ibn Uvaq is assassinated by Alp Arslan's son Tutush I who then become emir of Damascus. Tutush I appoints Artuk Bey as governor of Jerusalem.
- (Date unknown). Seville defeats the Granada at the Battle of Cabra. El Cid supported Seville in defeating Abdallah ibn Buluggin of Granada.

1080

- (Approximate) Roupen I establishes the Armenian Kingdom of Cilicia. (Note: Roupen I was the first lord of Armenian Cilicia beginning in 1080.)

1081

- 1 April. Alexios I Komnenos becomes Byzantine emperor. (Note: Alexios I Komnenos was the second Byzantine emperor of the Komnenian dynasty.)
- 18 October. The Normans under Robert Guiscard defeat the Byzantines at the Battle of Dyrrhachium.
- (Date unknown). El Cid banished from Castile by Alfonso VI.

1082

- Spring/Summer. The Taifa of Zaragoza under El Cid defeats the Taifa of Lleida and its Catalan allies at the Battle of Almenar. Berenguer Ramón II, count of Barcelona, is captured and released for ransom shortly thereafter.

1083

- (Date unknown). The Almoravid dynasty under Yusuf ibn Tashfin captures Ceuta.
- (Date unknown). Alexios I Komnenos defeats the Norman force of Bohemond of Taranto at the Battle of Trikkala.

1084

- May. Under siege from Holy Roman Emperor Henry IV since June 1083, Gregory VII asks for help from the Normans under Robert Guiscard. The emperor's forces are defeated by the Normans with an ensuing Sack of Rome.

1085

- 17 July. Robert Guiscard dies and is succeeded as Duke of Apulia and Calabria by Roger Borsa, bypassing his eldest son Bohemond of Taranto.
- Autumn. Alfonso VI of León and Castile defeats Yahya al-Qadir at the Siege of Toledo, taking the city held by the Moors since 932.

1086

- 10 July. Canute IV of Denmark is martyred.
- 23 October. The Moors under Yusuf ibn Tashfin defeat Alfonso VI of León and Castile at the Battle of Sagrajas.
- (Date unknown). Yağısiyan becomes the Seljuk governor of Antioch.

1087

- Spring. A French military campaign led by Odo I of Burgundy and William the Carpenter, supported by Alfonso VI and Sancho Ramirez, is turned away by the Moors at the first Siege of Tudela.
- August. The Byzantines are defeated by the Pechenegs at the Battle of Dristra.
- August. The Mahdia Campaign of 1087 begins with Pisa and Genoa attacking the Tunisia coast.

1088

- 12 March. Urban II is elected pope.

1089

- (Date unknown). Urban II grants a Crusade bull to Berenguer Ramón II and Ermengol IV of Urgell at the time of the attempted Reconquest of Tarragona.

1090

- (Date unknown). Hasan-i Sabbah establishes the Assassins after the capture of Alamut Castle in Persia.

1091

- 29 April. An invading force of Pechenegs is crushed by the Byzantines under Alexios I Komnenos and his Cuman allies at the Battle of Levounion.
- (Date unknown). Upon the death of Artuk Bey, his sons Sökmen and Ilghazi govern Jerusalem and begin the Artuqid Dynasty.

1092

- 19 November. Malik-Shah I dies and Kilij Arslan becomes Sultan of Rûm shortly thereafter.
- (Date unknown). Kerbogha becomes the first Seljuk atabeg of Mosul.

1093

- (Date unknown). A Christian coalition led by the Obotrite prince Henry and Magnus of Saxony defeats the Wends at the Battle of Schmilau.

1094

- (Date unknown). El Cid conquers the Taifa of Valencia.
- (Date unknown). Barkiyaruq becomes Seljuk sultan of Baghdad.

== The First Crusade ==
In order to recover the Holy Land and aid the Byzantines in their fight against the Seljuks, the First Crusade was called for by Urban II at the Council of Clermont in 1095 and culminated with the capture of Jerusalem in 1099.

1095

- 25 February. After the death of their father Tutush I, Duqaq becomes emir of Damascus and Ridwan the Seljuk ruler of Aleppo.
- 1–7 March. The Council of Piacenza is convened, with ambassadors from Alexius I Komnenos beseeching Urban II for help in fighting the Seljuk Turks.
- 17–27 November. At the Council of Clermont, Urban II issues a call to arms to reconquer the Holy Land for Christendom.

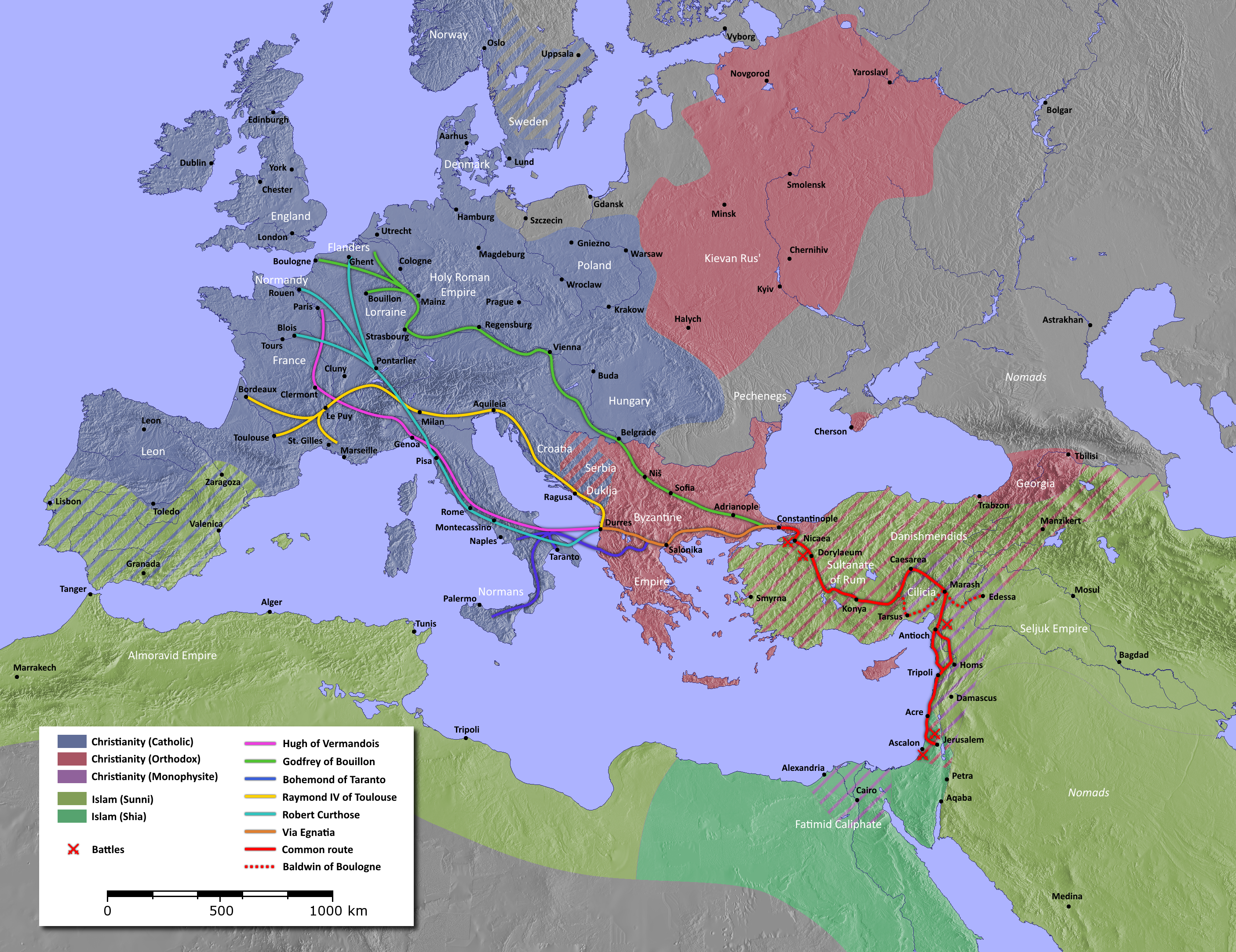
The routes of the First Crusaders

1096

- Early February. The First Crusade begins as the leaders are identified and form their armies. (Note: The leaders of the First Crusade were Hugh of Vermandois, Godfrey of Bouillon, Baldwin of Boulogne, Bohemond of Taranto, Tancred, Robert of Flanders, Raymond of Saint-Gilles, Adhemar of Le Puy, Stephen of Blois and Robert Curthose.)
- 12 April. The People's Crusade commences with Peter the Hermit and his army arriving at Cologne. (Note: The leaders of the People's Crusade were Peter the Hermit, Walter Sans Avoir, Emicho, Folkmar and Gottschalk.)
- 18 May. The Worms massacre begins the Rhineland massacres of Jews.
- August 15. The Armies of the First Crusade begin to depart for the Holy Land.
- Later. Urban II extends crusading indulgences to Spain.
- 21–29 September. The Seljuks under Kilij Arslan defeat the crusaders at the Siege of Xerigordos.
- 21 October. The People's Crusade ends with their defeat at the Battle of Civetot.
- November. Hugh of Vermandois and his army arrive at Constantinople.
- 23 December. The army led by Godfrey of Bouillon and his brother Baldwin of Boulogne arrive at Constantinople.
- (Date unknown). Peter I of Aragon completes the conquest of Huesca after the Battle of Alcoraz.

1097

- Early. The army of Peter I of Aragon and El Cid defeats the Moors at the Battle of Bairén.
- 26 April. The army of Bohemond of Taranto led by his nephew Tancred arrives at Constantinople. Bohemond himself had arrived earlier on 2 April.
- 27 April. The Provençal army of Robert of Flanders arrives at Constantinople.
- Late April. Raymond of Saint-Gilles and Adhemar of Le Puy arrive with their armies at Constantinople.

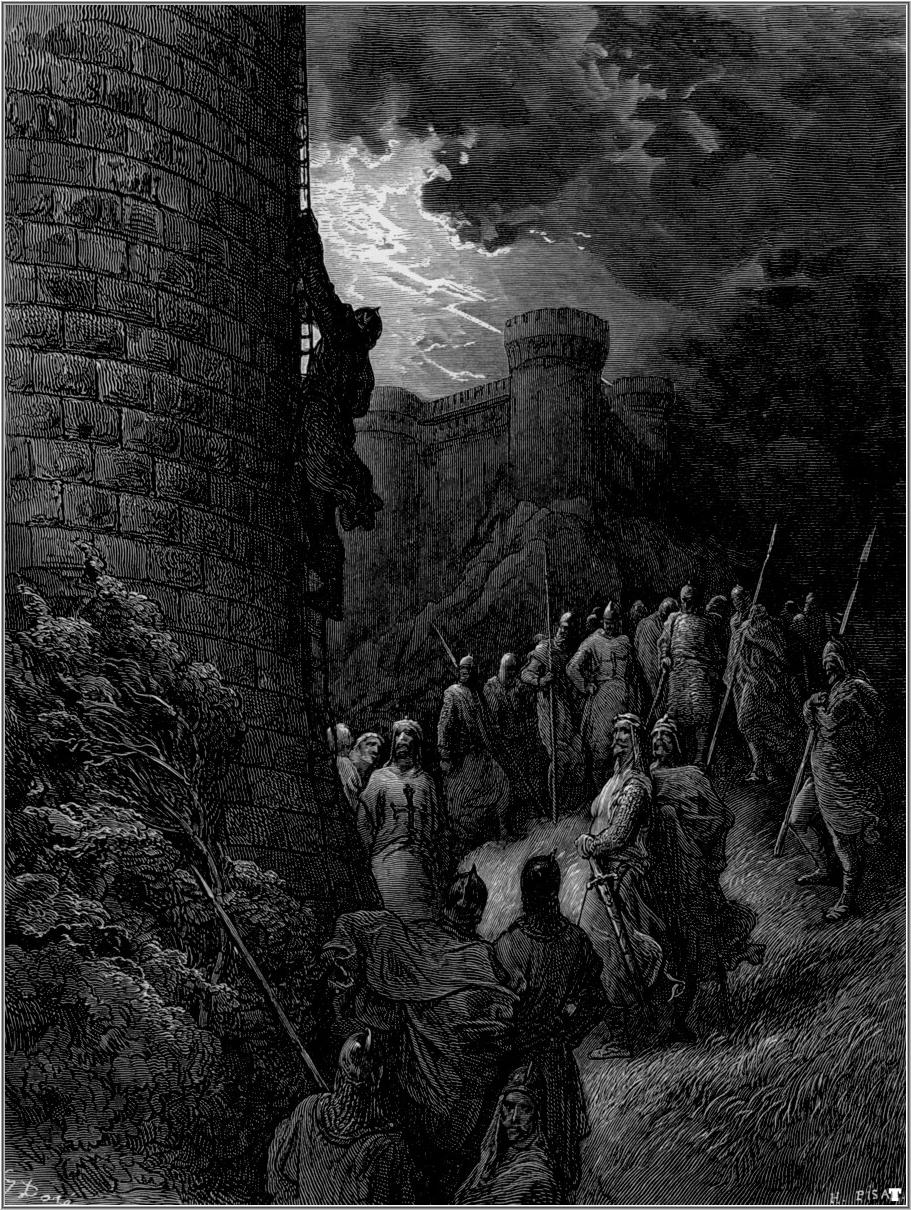
Bohemond and his Norman troops scale the walls of Antioch, in an engraving by Gustave Doré.

- 14–28 May. The armies of Stephen of Blois and Robert Curthose arrive in Constantinople.
- 14 May – 19 June. The Seljuk Turks under Kilij Arslan surrender the city of Nicaea, under their control since 1081, to the Byzantines after the Crusader Siege of Nicaea.
- 1 July. After defeating the Seljuk forces of Kilij Arslan at the Battle of Dorylaeum, the Crusaders capture Arslan's treasure.
- 15 August. The army of Alfonso VI of León and Castile is defeated by the Moors at the Battle of Consuegra.
- 17 October. Baldwin of Boulogne leaves the main Crusader force and takes the fortress of Turbessel and makes Bagrat Pakrad governor.
- 20 October. The Siege of Antioch begins, pitting the combined Crusader armies against the defenders of Antioch, led by Yağısiyan.
- 31 December. The relief force from Damascus under Duqaq is turned back.

1098

- 9 February. The Aleppian force of Ridwan is stopped at the Battle of the Lake of Antioch.
- 14–20 February. Baldwin of Boulogne undertakes an unsuccessful Expedition to Samosata to conquer the city of Samsat.
- 9 March. Baldwin of Boulogne establishes the County of Edessa, the first of the Crusader states. (Note: Baldwin of Boulogne was the first Count of Edessa. He was later the first king of Jerusalem as his brother Godfrey of Bouillon chose not to take the title of king.)
- 3 June. The city of Antioch is captured and Yağısiyan is killed. The next day, a counterattack is mounted by Kerbogha.
- 14 June. Peter Bartholomew claims to have miraculously found the Holy Lance.
- 28 June. The forces of Kerbogha are defeated at the Battle of Antioch.
- July or August. Simeon II of Jerusalem is exiled to Cyprus.
- Early July. The Principality of Antioch is established under Bohemond. (Note: Bohemond of Taranto was the first Prince of Antioch as Bohemond I of Antioch.)
- 1 August. Adhemar of Le Puy, the pope's representative for the expedition, dies of the plague.
- 26 August. Al-Afdal Shahanshah captures Jerusalem from the Seljuks and installs Iftikhar Ad-Daulah as governor of the city.
- 3–10 October. The Council of Bari is convened by Urban II.
- 11 December. The Crusaders are successful in their Siege of Ma'arrat Nu'man begun on 27 November. (Note: There is speculation that the Tafurs engaged in cannibalism with the slaughtered residents of Ma'arrat Nu'man.)

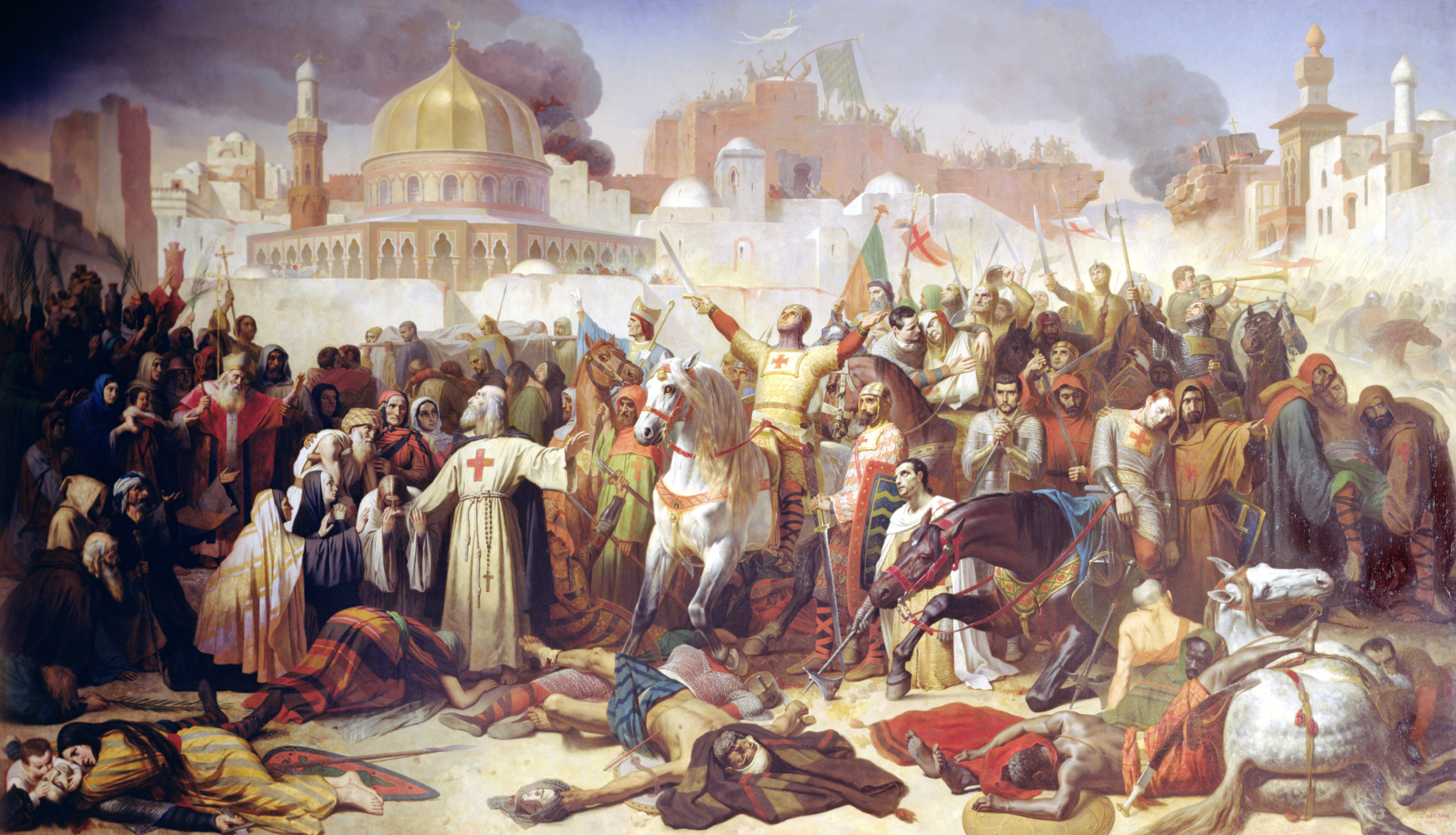
Taking of Jerusalem by the Crusaders (1847) by Émile Signol.

1099

- 13 May. Tancred is unsuccessful in his Siege of Arqa.
- 7 June – 15 July. The Crusaders capture the Holy City after the Siege of Jerusalem.
- July 15 (approximate). Simeon II of Jerusalem dies.
- 22 July. Godfrey of Bouillon becomes the first ruler of Jerusalem. (Note: Godfrey of Bouillon took the titles of prince (princeps) and advocate or defender of the Holy Sepulchre (advocatus Sancti Sepulchri).)
- 29 July. Urban II dies, never knowing that his crusade was successful.
- 1 August. Arnulf of Chocques is elected as the first Latin Patriarch of Jerusalem.
- 5 August. Arnulf discovers the relic of the True Cross.
- 12 August. The First Crusade ends with the successful Battle of Ascalon, defeating the Fatimids under Al-Afdal Shahanshah. (Note: Crusaders who joined the Reconquista after returning from the Holy Land include: Gaston IV of Béarn, Rotrou III of Perche, Centule II of Bigorre, William IX of Aquitaine, Bernard Ato IV and William V of Montpellier.)
- 13 August. Paschal II is elected pope.
- 15 October 15. Godfrey begins the first Siege of Arsuf, to be abandoned without success on 15 December.
- 25 December. Arnulf of Chocques abdicates and Daimbert of Pisa becomes Latin Patriarch of Jerusalem.
- (Date unknown). The Order of the Hospital of St. John of Jerusalem, the Knights Hospitaller, is formed.
- (Date unknown). Tancred becomes prince of Galilee.

== The Kingdom of Jerusalem ==
The Kingdom of Jerusalem was formed in 1099 and enjoyed relative success against the warring Seljuks and Fatimids in its early years until the advent of the Zengids in 1127.

1100

- 18 July. Godfrey of Bouillon dies.
- 25 July – 20 August. The Crusader victory at the Siege of Haifa results in the creation of the Lordship of Haifa.
- August. A force led by Bohemond of Taranto is defeated by that of Gazi Gümüshtigin at the Battle of Melitene. Bohemond is captured, to be held for three years. Tancred then becomes regent of Antioch.
- October. The forces of Baldwin I of Jerusalem defeat those of Duqaq at the Battle of the Dog River.
- 15 November. Paschal II preaches new a crusade, threatening excommunication for failure to fulfill vows.
- Christmas Day. Baldwin I of Jerusalem is elected king. (Note: Baldwin I of Jerusalem was the first of the kings and queens of Jerusalem.)
- Late. Gesta Francorum (Deeds of the Franks), an anonymous chronicle covering the period from November 1095 until the Battle of Ascalon, is written.

A map of western Anatolia, showing the routes taken by Christian armies in the Crusade of 1101

1101

- 29 April. Baldwin I of Jerusalem is successful in the second Siege of Arsuf and he continues his campaign and captures Caesarea on 2 May.
- 23 June. Raymond of Saint Gilles captures Ankara in his advance through Asia Minor.
- Summer. The Crusade of 1101 begins with a force of Lombards, Nivernais, French and Bavarians to reinforce the young Kingdom of Jerusalem.
- August. The Seljuks and Danishmendids defeat the Lombard force at the Battle of Mersivan. (Note: The Turkish commanders at Mersivan included Kilij Arslan, Gazi Gümüshtigin and Ridwan. The Crusaders were led by Raymond of Saint-Gilles and Stephen of Blois.)
- August. The remaining Crusader forces are defeated by Kilij Arslan at Heraclea Cybistra, ending the Crusade of 1101. (Note: The Crusaders had two separate forces remaining after Mersivan. One under William II of Nevers and a second under William IX of Aquitaine and Hugh of Vermandois.)
- 7 September. Baldwin I of Jerusalem leads his crusader force to victory over the Fatimids at the First Battle of Ramla.

1102

- Spring. The first Siege of Acre by the Crusaders is inconclusive.
- 5 May. Valencia taken by the Moors.
- 17 May. The Fatimids defeat the forces of the Kingdom of Jerusalem at the Second Battle of Ramla.
- 28 May. The Crusaders recover from their loss at Ramla and defeat the Fatimids at the Siege of Jaffa.
- 11 September. Ramon Berenguer III attacks the Moors and is defeated at the Battle of Mollerussa.
- (Date unknown). Mons Peregrinus (Castle of Mount Pilgrim) is constructed by Raymond of Saint Gilles near Tripoli.
- (Date unknown). The Crusader states begin their Siege of Tripoli, then under the Seljuks. The siege would last until 12 July 1109, with a Crusader victory.
- (Date unknown). Raymond of Aguilers writes his chronicle Historia Francorum qui ceperunt Iherusalem (History of the Franks who captured Jerusalem).

1103

- April/May. Tancred captures Latakia from the Byzantines after an 18-month siege.
- August. Bohemond of Taranto returns to Antioch after being ransomed by Latin Patriarch Bernard of Valence with the help of the Armenian noble Kogh Vasil.
- (Date unknown). Eric I of Denmark and his wife Boedil begin a pilgrimage to the Holy Land as described in the Knýtlinga saga.

1104

- 7 May. The Crusader states of Antioch and Edessa, are defeated by Jikirmish and Sökman at the Battle of Harran, their first major battle.
- Afterwards. Baldwin of Bourcq (then count of Edessa and later king of Jerusalem as Baldwin II) and Joscelin I of Edessa are taken captive.
- 25 May. With the help of a Geneose fleet, Baldwin I of Jerusalem defeats the Fatimids at the second Siege of Acre that began 20 days earlier.
- 14 June. Toghtekin establishes the Burid Dynasty and becomes emir of Damascus after the death of Duqaq.
- 28 September. Alfonso the Battler becomes king of Aragon and Navarre.
- (Date unknown). The Archdiocese of Lund is established as the metropolitan of the North by Alberic of Ostia.
- (Date unknown). Sæwulf, an English pilgrim who travelled to the Holy Land in 1102–1103, writes of his adventures.

1105

- 13 February. Muhammad I Tapar becomes sultan of the Seljuks.
- 28 February. Raymond of Saint Gilles dies at Tripoli.
- Spring. Tancred is successful at the Battle of Artah, defeating the Aleppine forces of Ridwan.
- 27 August. Baldwin I of Jerusalem defeats the Fatimids at the Third Battle of Ramla.

1106

- 26 May. Bruno of Segni conducts a Council at Poitiers to summon a crusade in support of Bohemond of Taranto.
- Late. Jikirmish is murdered by Jawali Saqawa as he takes Mosul. Baldwin of Bourcq is now Jawali's prisoner.
- (Date unknown). Fulcher of Chartres, a priest who participated in the First Crusade eventually joining Baldwin I of Jerusalem, publishes the first version of his chronicle Gesta Francorum Iherusalem Perefrinantium.
- Approximate. Daniel of Kiev makes a pilgrimage to the Holy Land.

1107

- June. After the Battle of Mosul, Kilij Arslan was defeated by Muhammad I Tapar, Ilghazi and Ridwan of Aleppo at the battle of Khabur River where he died.
- 9 October. Bohemond of Taranto invades Byzantium, beginning his crusade.
- November. The Siege of Dyrrhachium begins, to last eleven months with a Byzantine victory.
- Autumn. The first Norwegian Crusade led by Sigurd the Crusader begins with attacks on Iberia.

1108

- 29 May. The Moors defeat the forces of Alfonso VI of León and Castile at the Battle of Uclés.
- Summer. Baldwin of Bourcq is released and returns to Edessa.
- September. Negotiations between Alexius I Komnenos and Bohemond of Taranto begin, resulting in the Treaty of Devol in which Bohemond agrees to become a vassal to the emperor. This ended the Siege of Dyrrhachium.
- September. Antioch defeats Edessa at the Battle of Turbessel. Baldwin of Bourcq, representing the Principality of Antioch, allied with Jawali Saqawa, and Tancred, as regent of the County of Edessa, allied with Ridwan.
- October. Mawdud replaces Jawali Saqawa as atabeg of Mosul.
- (Date unknown). The Archbishopric of Magdeburg calls for war against the Wends.
- (Date unknown). Benedictine historian Guibert of Nogent writes Dei gesta per Francos (Deeds of God through the Franks).
- (Date unknown). French historian Bartolf of Nangis published Gesta Francorum Iherusalem expugnatium.

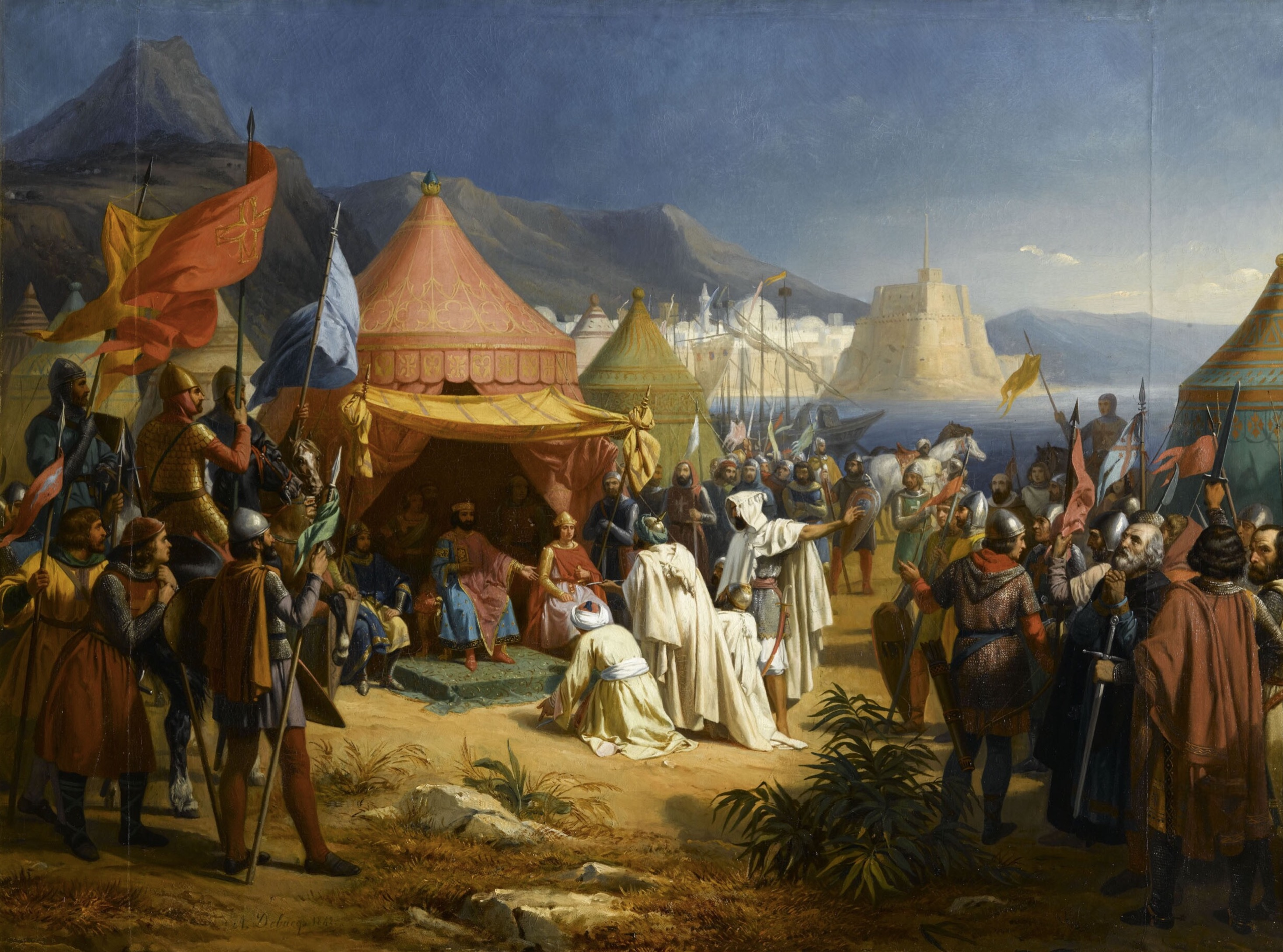
Fakhr al-Mulk ibn Ammar submitting to Bertrand of Toulouse after the Siege of Tripoli, in an 1842 painting by Charles-Alexandre Debacq.

1109

- 12 July. The Crusaders take the city after the successful conclusion of the Siege of Tripoli. This led to the establishment of the County of Tripoli under Bertrand of Toulouse. (Note: Bertrand of Toulouse was the first count of Tripoli after the capture of the city. Raymond of Saint-Gilles was declared count in 1102.)
- (Date unknown). The Norwegians take control of the city from the Moors after the Siege of Lisbon.
- Later. Sigurd the Crusader attacks Formentera in the Balearic Islands.

1110

- February – 13 May. Baldwin I of Jerusalem and Bertrand of Toulouse defeat the Fatimids at the Siege of Beirut.May–
- May–July. The Seljuk campaign on Edessa results in a stalemate.
- 19 October – 5 December. Baldwin I and Sigurd the Crusader capture the city from the Fatimids after the Siege of Sidon.
- (Date unknown). Imprisoned since the death of his father Kilij Arslan, Malik Shah becomes Seljuk sultan of Rûm, a position vacant for three years.
- (Date unknown). Tancred takes control of the Arab fortress of Krak des Chevaliers.
- (Date unknown). Baldric of Dol writes his Historiae Hierosolymitanae libri IV.

1111

- 25 May. The Moors succeed in the Capture of Santarém, overwhelming the forces of Henry of Portugal.
- 13–29 September. The forces of Baldwin I of Jerusalem meet those of Mawdud at the Battle of Shaizar. The battle is inconclusive and the Crusaders withdraw.
- 29 November. Crusader forces begin the Siege of Tyre against the Fatimids.
- (Date unknown). Peter Tudebode writes his Historia de Hierosolymitano itinere, a history of the First Crusade.

1112

- April–June. Mawdud attacks Edessa.
- 10 April. Toghtekin relieves the Fatimids at Tyre, ending the Siege of Tyre.
- 12 October. Vasil Dgha becomes ruler of Raban and Kaisun upon the death of his father Kogh Vasil.
- 12 December. Tancred dies and is succeeded by Joscelin I of Edessa at Galilee.
- December. Arnoulf of Chocques is elected as Latin Patriarch of Jerusalem.
- (Date unknown). Benedictine monk Sigebert of Gembloux writes his Chronicon sive Chronographia, a chronological survey covering 1008–1111.

1113

- 15 February. Paschal II issues papal bull Pie postulatio voluntatis recognizing the Knights Hospitaller.
- 28 June. Mawdud and Toghtekin lead the Seljuks to victory over the forces of Baldwin I of Jerusalem at the Battle of al-Sannabra.
- August. Having repudiated his wife Arda of Armenia, Baldwin I of Jerusalem marries Adelaide del Vasto.
- September. The Balearic Islands Expedition begins with a raid on Ibiza.
- 2 October. Mawdud is murdered by Assassins and is succeeded by al-Bursuqi as atabeg of Mosul.
- 10 December. Ridwan dies and is succeeded as sultan of Aleppo by his son Alp Arslan al-Akhras under the regency of Lu'lu' al-Yaya.
- (Date unknown). The Byzantines turn back a Seljuk raid at the Siege of Nicaea.

1114

- June. Ramon Berenguer III leads the Balearic Islands Expedition, capturing the islands from the Taifa of Dénia in August 1115.
- August. William V of Montpellier, as part of this expedition, captures Majorca from the Moors.
- 19 November. A massive earthquake of estimated magnitude 7.5 strikes Syria.
- Late. Ilghazi defeats al-Bursuqi, who is replaced as atabeg of Mosul by Juyûsh-Beg and by Bursuk ibn Bursuk as Seljuk commander.

1115

- Summer/Fall. Baldwin I of Jerusalem begins construction of the castle Krak de Montreal.
- 14 September. A Crusader army led by Roger of Salerno defeats the Seljuks under Bursuk ibn Bursuk at the Battle of Tell Danith (Battle of Sarmin).

1116

- Autumn. A Byzantine army led by Alexios I Komnenos defeats the forces of Malik Shah at the Battle of Philomelion.
- Later. After signing a treaty with the Byzantines, Malik Shah is murdered by his brother Mesud I.
- (Date unknown). Ramon Berenguer III travels to Rome to petition Paschal II for a crusade to liberate Tarragona.
- (Date unknown). The Armenian lands of Vasil Dgha are conquered by Baldwin I of Jerusalem.
- (Date unknown). Novgorod and Pskov begin an expedition against Tartu and the fortress of Otepää.

1117

- 2 June. Ali ibn Yusuf fails in his attempt to capture the city in the second Siege of Coimbra.
- No earlier than. Liber maiolichinus de gestis Pisanorum illustribus is written, detailing the Balearic Islands Expedition.

The Crusader states and their neighbors.

1118

- March. Baldwin I of Jerusalem launches a campaign against Egypt where he becomes ill and dies at el-'Arish.
- 2 April. Baldwin II of Jerusalem becomes king.
- 18 April. Muhammad I Tapar dies and was succeeded as Seljuk sultan by Mahmud II.
- 15 August. Alexios I Komnenos dies and is succeeded by his son John II Komnenos.
- May–December. The Conquest of Zaragoza led by Alfonso I of Aragon takes the city of Zaragoza from the Moors. Alfonso I was granted a Crusade bull for this endeavor.
- December. Roger of Antioch and Leo I of Armenia capture Azaz from Ilghazi.
- (Date unknown). Norman chaplain Ralph of Caen writes Gesta Tancredi (The Deeds of Tancred in the Crusade).

1119

- 1 February. Callixtus II becomes pope.
- Spring. John II Komnenos defeats the Seljuks of Rûm at the Siege of Laodicea.
- 28 June. Roger of Salerno's Crusader army is annihilated by the forces of Ilghazi at the Battle of Ager Sanguinis (Battle of the Field of Blood).
- 14 August. Baldwin II of Jerusalem defeats Ilghazi at the Battle of Hab (also known as the Second Battle of Tell Danith).
- (Date unknown). Alfonso I of Aragon conquers the city in the second Siege of Tudela.
- (Date unknown). Hugues de Payens founds the Knights Templar and becomes its first Grand Master.

1120

- 16 January. The Council of Nablus establishes the written laws of the Kingdom of Jerusalem.
- June. Alfonso I of Aragon defeats the Almoravids at the Battle of Cutanda.
- (Date unknown). William IX of Aquitaine joins forces with the Castilians in an unsuccessful effort to take Cordoba.
- (Date unknown). The forces of John II Komnenos defeat those of the Seljuks of Rûm at the Siege of Sozopolis.
- (Date unknown). Callixtus II issues the papal bull Sicut Judaeis laying out the Church's position on Jews.

1121

- 12 August. The forces of Ilghazi are defeated by those of David IV of Georgia at the Battle of Didgori, the culmination of the Georgian–Seljuk Wars.
- 11 December. Al-Afdal Shahanshah is murdered by Assassins.
- (Date unknown). German historian Albert of Aix writes his Historia Hierosolymitanae expeditionis (History of the Expedition to Jerusalem), an account of the First Crusade.

1122

- February. Tbilisi is recovered by David IV of Georgia from the Seljuks after the Siege of Tbilisi.
- 8 August. The Venetian Crusade begins with Battle of Jaffa in which the Venetian fleet defeated the Fatimids.
- 13 September. Joscelin I of Edessa and Waleran of Le Puiset are captured by Belek Ghazi, later emir of Aleppo.
- 3 November. Ilghazi dies and is succeeded at Aleppo by his son Timurtash.
- (Date unknown). Callixtus II declares a crusade in Spain.

1123

- 18 March. The First Council of the Lateran is convened. (Note: The First Council of the Lateran ruled that the crusades to the Holy Land and the Reconquista of Spain were of equal standing, granting equal privileges.)
- 18 April. Baldwin II of Jerusalem is captured by Belek Ghazi at Kharput, joining Joscelin I and Waleran.
- 29 May. A Crusader force under Eustace Grenier defeats the Fatimids at the Battle of Iberlin.
- Late. Pactum Warmundi, a treaty between the Kingdom of Jerusalem and the Republic of Venice, is negotiated.
- Approximate. French poet Gilo of Toucy writes Historia de via Hierosolymitana, an epic verse history of the First Crusade.

1124

- 6 May. Belek Ghazi is killed in battle, and his hostages are taken by his cousin Timurtash.
- 29 June. The Venetians and Franks are successful in the Siege of Tyre, capturing the city from Toghtekin and ending the Venetian Crusade.
- June–August. Sigurd the Crusader conducts the Kalmar Expedition, a leidang to Christianize the region of Småland. This is the first of the Northern Crusades.
- 29 August. Baldwin II of Jerusalem is released after paying Timurtash a ransom and providing additional hostages, including his daughter Ioveta of Bethany.
- 6 October. Baldwin II of Jerusalem begins Siege of Aleppo to secure the release of Timurtash's hostages.
- Not earlier than. Historia Roderici, an early history of El Cid, is written.
- (Date unknown). Al-Bursuqi is reinstated as atabeg of Mosul.
- (Date unknown). Otto of Bamberg begins the Christianization of Pomerania.

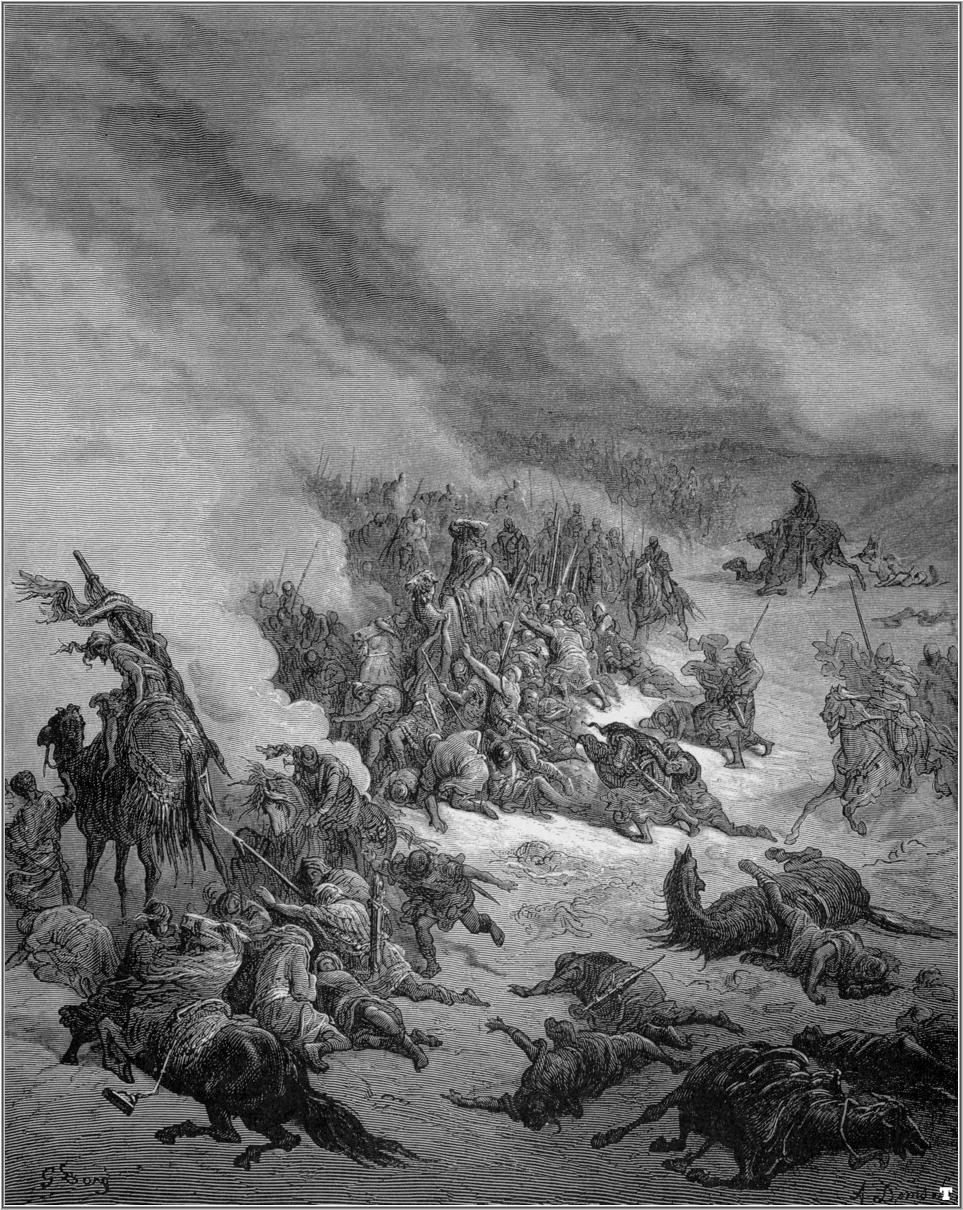
Alfonso the Battler launches the campaign against Granada, in an engraving by Gustave Doré.

1125

- 25 January. Ibn al-Khashshab is reinforced by al-Bursuqi, causing Baldwin II of Jerusalem to withdraw from the Siege of Aleppo.
- 11 June. Baldwin II of Jerusalem and Leo I of Armenia defeat the forces of al-Bursuqi and Toghtekin at the Battle of Azaz.
- September. Ioveta of Bethany and the other hostages are ransomed with the booty of Azaz.
- 2 September. Alfonso I launches the Granada campaign to attempt to capture the city.
- (Date unknown). Bavarian abbot Ekkehard of Aura writes his Hierosolymita, covering the period 1098–1125.
- (Date unknown) English historian William of Malmesbury writes Gesta Regum Anglorum (Deeds of the Kings of the English).

1126

- 26 January. Baldwin II of Jerusalem defeats Toghtekin at the Battle of Marj al-Saffar but fails to take Damascus, the untimate objective of the campaign.
- 26 November. Al-Bursuqi is murdered by Assassins, believed to be on the orders of Mahmud II.
- November. Toghtekin grants the castle at Banias to the Assassins.

== Zengi and the fall of Edessa ==
In 1094, the governor of Aleppo, Aq Sunqur al-Hajib, was beheaded by Tutush I for treason. His son Imad al-Din Zengi was raised by Kerbogha, the governor of Mosul, and would rise to challenge the Crusader states. His successful Siege of Edessa would both result in the Second Crusade and the eventual fall of the County of Edessa.

1127

- September. Zengi becomes atabeg of Mosul, beginning the Zengid dynasty.
- Summer/Fall. Stephen II of Hungary sacks Belgrade, beginning the Byzantine–Hungarian War.

1128

- 12 February. Toghtekin dies and is succeeded by his son Taj al-Muluk Buri.
- 18 June. Zengi becomes atabeg of Aleppo.
- (Date unknown). The Santa Maria Alemanna (Church of Saint Mary of the Germans) is founded in Jerusalem.

1129

- 13 January. Bernard of Clairvaux convenes the Council of Troyes which approves the Latin Rule for Templar conduct.
- 2 June. Fulk V of Anjou, later king of Jerusalem, marries Melisende of Jerusalem, the heir to the kingdom.
- October – 5 December. Baldwin II of Jerusalem begins the Crusade of 1129 against Damascus defended by Buri. The attack was abandoned with only the castle of Banias captured.
- (Date unknown). Sawar ibn Aytegin named governor of Aleppo by Zengi.

Territories conquered by Zengi (in green).

1130

- 14 February. Innocent II becomes pope.
- February. Bohemond II of Antioch is killed in battle with the Danishmends at the Battle of Ceyhan River and is succeeded at Antioch by his daughter Constance of Antioch.
- Later. Alice of Antioch (wife of Bohemond II and daughter of Baldwin II) attempts to make an alliance with Zengi and is expelled from Antioch.
- May. The Moors defeat Aragon at the Battle of Valencia.
- Spring. Zengi lays siege to the Crusader-held city of al-Atharib defended by Baldwin II of Jerusalem. After winning the Battle of al-Atharib, Zengi reduces the city to rubble.
- October. Alfonso I of Aragon launches the Siege of Bayonne against the Aquitainian city of Bayonne defended by William X of Aquitaine. The siege was lifted after a year without success.

1131

- 21 August. Baldwin II of Jerusalem dies and is succeeded by his daughter Melisende of Jerusalem and her husband Fulk of Jerusalem as queen and king of Jerusalem.

1132

- 6 June. Taj al-Muluk Buri dies and his son Shams al-Mulk Isma'il becomes ruler of Damascus and head of the Burid dynasty.
- Summer. Zengi marches on Baghdad to add it to his dominions and is defeated by the forces of caliph al-Mustarshid.
- 11 December. Shams al-Mulk Isma'il captures Banias from the Crusaders.
- (Date unknown). Alice of Antioch reasserts her claim to Antioch.

1133

- (Date unknown). Zengi raids the County of Tripoli and defeats the Crusades at the Battle of Rafaniyya.

1134

- March. Tashfin ibn Ali defeats a Castilian raiding party at the Battle of Badajoz.
- 17 July. Moors defeat Alfonso I of Aragon at the Battle of Fraga.
- Late. Hugh II du Puiset revolts against Fulk of Jerusalem and is exiled for three years.
- (Date unknown). The Saxons erect the castle of Segeberg.

1135

- 17 April. Zengi's campaign against Antioch begins with the capture of al-Atharib, followed by Zardana, Ma’arat al-Nu’man, Ma’arrat Misrin and Kafartab.
- (Date unknown). Pons of Tripoli is repelled by Zengi in the Battle of Qinnasrin.
- (Date unknown). A Moorish fleet raids the Catalan town of Elna.
- (Date unknown). Eric II of Denmark defeats the Lechites under Ratibor I of Pomerania in a naval battle off the coast of Denmark.

1136

- Summer. Danish forces under Eric II of Denmark attack Slavic Rügen, taking its capital Arkona.

1137

- (Date unknown). Forces under Fulk of Jerusalem are defeated by those of Zengi at the Battle of Ba'rin.
- (Date unknown). Fulk of Jerusalem takes refuge in the castle at Montferrand and surrenders to Zengi.

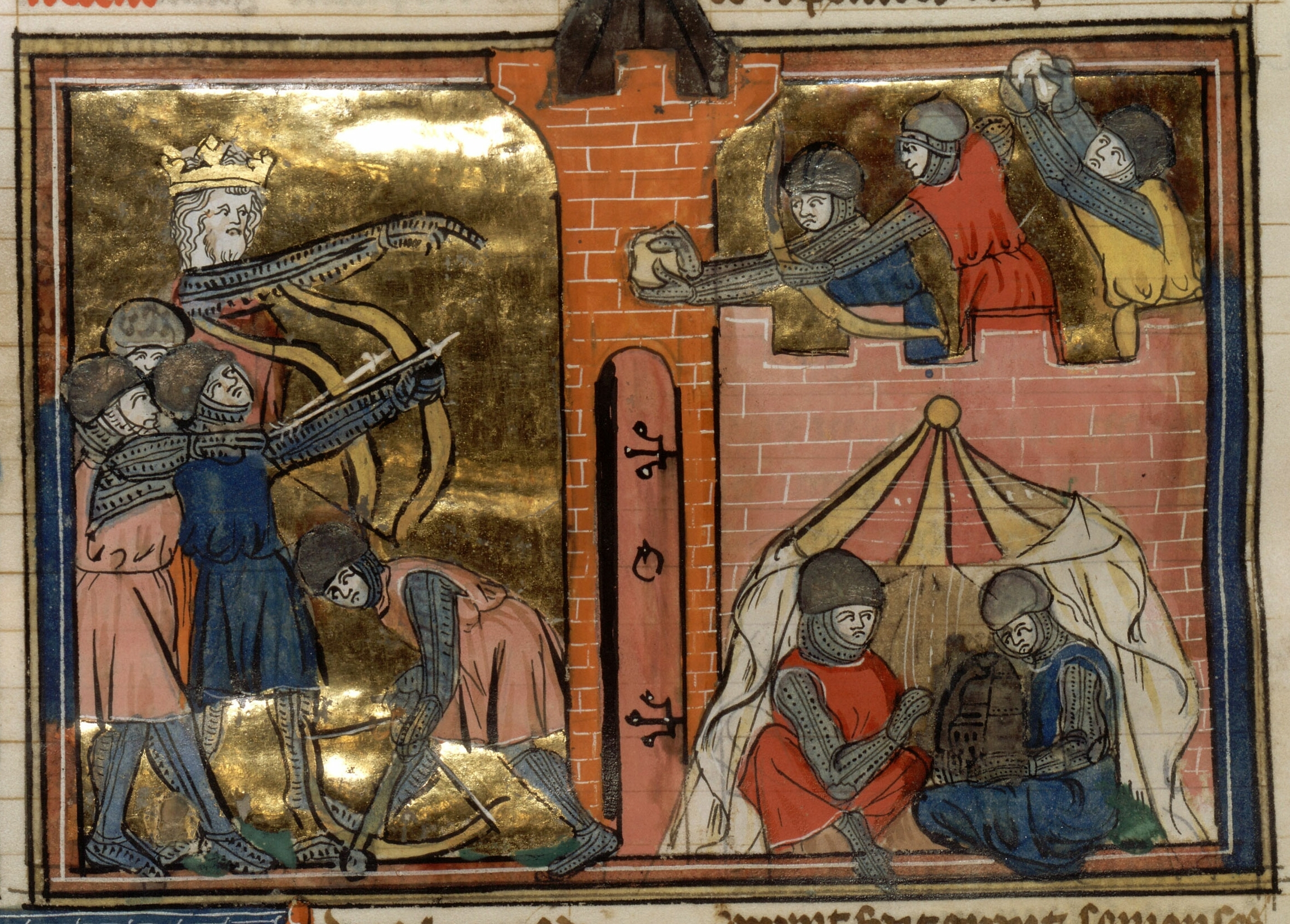
John II Komnenos directs the unsuccessful Siege of Shaizar against Zengid territory. From a French manuscript, dated 1338.

1138

- 14–20 April. John II Komnenos leads a Byzantine and Frankish force in the unsuccessful Siege of Aleppo, with the city defended by Zengi.
- 28 April – 21 May. The Byzantine and Frankish forces are successful in their Siege of Shaizar. The siege captured the city but not the citadel, and the emir became a vassal of Byzantium.
- July. At the first Siege of Coria, Alfonso VII of León and Castile fails in his attempt to take the city.
- 11 October. The 1138 Aleppo earthquake strikes, the third deadliest in history.
- (Date unknown). The Crusaders are defeated by the Turks at the Battle of Teqoa.

1139

- 29 March. Innocent II issues papal bull Omne Datum Optimum giving papal protection to the Knights Templar.
- April – October. Alfonso VII of León and Castile wins the first major victory against the Moors in the Reconquista at the Siege of Oreja.
- 25 July. Afonso Henriques defeats the Moors at the Battle of Ourique.
- Shortly thereafter. Kingdom of Portugal is declared and Alfonso Henriques becomes Afonso I of Portugal. (Note: Afonso Henriques was the first king of Portugal as Afonso I of Portugal beginning in 1139.)

1140

- February. Crusaders en route to Jerusalem asked by Afonso I of Portugal to take Lisbon, but fail to take the city after the first Siege of Lisbon. (Note: Some sources have the first Siege of Lisbon happening in 1142.)
- 12 June. Mu'in al-Din Unur enters a pact with Fulk of Jerusalem and they take Banias.
- 2 June. Zengi unsuccessfully besieges Damascus and retires from Syria.
- (Approximate). The Castilian epic poem about El Cid, Cantar de mio Cid, is written.

1141

- 9 September. The Qara Khitai defeat the Seljuks at the Battle of Qatwan.

1142

- May – June. Alfonso VII of León and Castile takes the city from the Moors in the second Siege of Coria.
- (Date unknown). Raymond II of Tripoli grants the Krak des Chevaliers to the Knights Hospitaller.
- (Date unknown). Matthew of Edessa writes his Chronicle covering Armenian history from 951–1136.

1143

- 1 March. Muño Alfonso and an army of knights from Ávila, Segovia, and Toledo defeats Moors at the Battle of Montiel.
- 8 April. John II Komnenos is killed in a hunting accident and his succeeded by his son Manuel I Komnenos.
- 25 December. Fulk of Jerusalem is killed in a hunting accident and Baldwin III of Jerusalem becomes king of Jerusalem, co-ruling with his mother Melisende of Jerusalem.
- (Date unknown). Henry the Lion grants the Slavic lands of Wagria and Polabia to Saxon counts.

1144

- 28 November – 24 December. Zengi is successful in his Siege of Edessa that would both result in the Second Crusade and the eventual fall of the County of Edessa.
- (Date unknown). Pope Celestine II issues the bull Milites Templi (Soldiers of the Temple) protecting the Knights Templar.
- (Date unknown). The first stronghold of the Knights Templar is established in the Kingdom of León and Castile.
- (Date unknown). During the reign of Sverker I of Sweden, the Cistercians establish Catholic abbeys in Sweden and Denmark at the invitation of queen Ulvhild Håkansdotter.

1145

- January. Zengi's successful attack on the fortress at Saruj results in the Fall of Saruj.
- 15 February. Eugene III becomes pope.
- (Date unknown). Eugene III issues the bull Militia Dei (Knights of God) providing for the Knights Templar's independence from local clerical hierarchies.
- (Date unknown). Alberic of Ostia sent to Languedoc by Eugene III to deal with the Cathars.

== The Second Crusade ==
The fall of Edessa in 1144 would lead to the Second Crusade which would include French and German expeditions to the Holy Land, a campaign in Iberia (part of the Reconquista) and the Wendish Crusade (part of the Northern Crusades). The failure of the campaigns in the Holy Land would reverberate for decades.

1145

- 1 December. Eugene III issues the papal bull Quantum praedecessores calling for the Second Crusade.
- 25 December. Louis VII of France declares his intention at Bourges to support the crusade.

1146

- 1 March. The reissue of papal bull Quantum praedecessores allows Bernard of Clairvaux to preach the crusade throughout Europe.
- 31 March. Louis VII of France and his wife Eleanor of Aquitaine take the cross and lead the French forces of the crusade.
- Spring. Manuel I Komnenos leads the unsuccessful Expedition to Iconium against the Seljuks under Mesud I.
- 14 September. Zengi is assassinated by one of his slaves and is succeeded by his sons Nūr-ad-Din in Aleppo and Sayf al-Din Ghazi I in Mosul.
- 5 October. Eugene III issues the first part of the papal bull Divina dispensatione urging Italians to join the Second Crusade.
- October–November. Joscelyn II of Edessa recaptures Edessa but loses it shortly after Nūr-ad-Din's successful second Siege of Edessa.
- 24 December. Conrad III of Germany and Frederick Barbarossa take the cross and lead the German forces of the crusade.
- (Date unknown). The Military Order of Aviz, a body of Portuguese knights, is founded to fight the Moors.
- (Date unknown). Otto of Freising writes the first part of his Chronica sive Historia de duabus civitatibus covering the First Crusade and Crusade of 1101. This contains the first reference to Prester John.

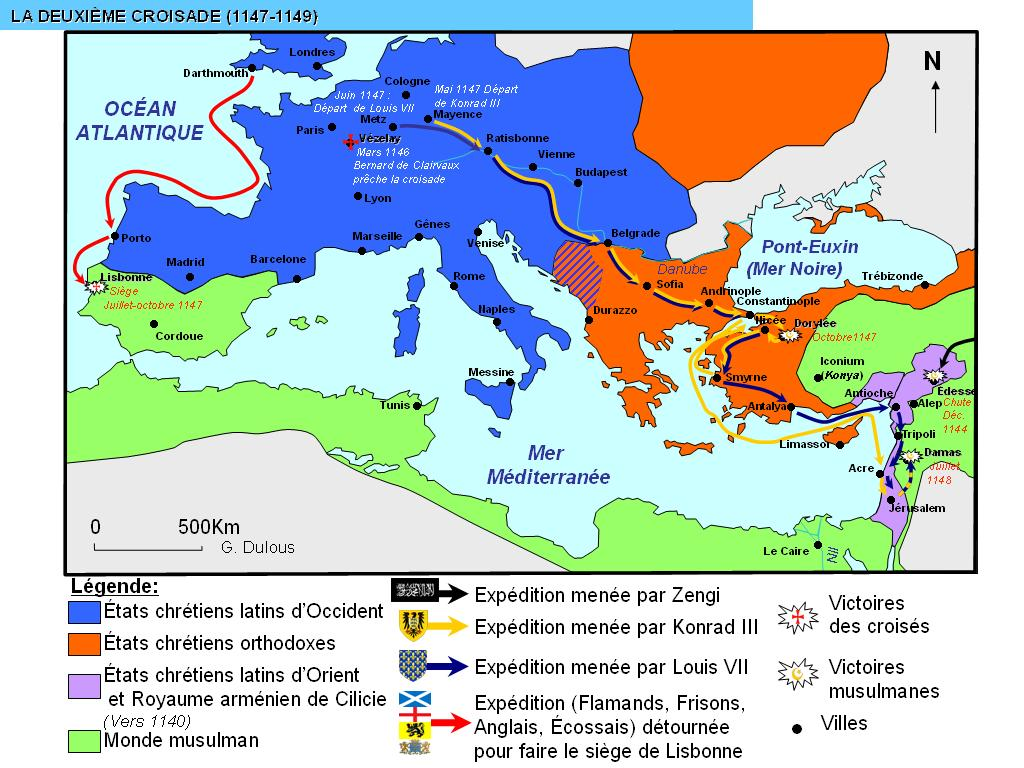
Map of the Second Crusade.

1147

- 16 February. French forces meet in Étampes to discuss their route to the Holy Land.
- 15 March. Afonso I of Portugal completes the Conquest of Santarém.
- 11 April. The second part of the papal bull Divina dispensatione is issued, calling for the Wendish Crusade against the Polabian Slavs.
- Later. In response, Christian forces are assembled including Saxons under Albert the Bear and Henry the Lion and Danes under Canute V of Denmark and Sweyn III of Denmark assemble.
- 27 April. Eugene III extends the crusade to Iberia. The first contingent of Crusaders depart from England, but bad weather forces them to stop in Porto where they will aid the Portuguese.
- Spring. In the first battle of the crusade, Baldwin III of Jerusalem is defeated by Damascene forces under Mu'in ad-Din Unur at the Battle of Bosra.
- June. The French contingent leaves for Constantinople.
- 26 June. The Wendish Crusade begins as the Wends under Slavic prince Niklot sack Lübeck.
- 1 July – 25 October. In one of their few successes, crusaders led by Afonso I of Portugal defeat the Moors at the second Siege of Lisbon.
- July – 17 October. The forces of Alfonso VII of León and Castile are successful in the Siege of Almería.
- August. The Provençal contingent under Alfonso Jordan departs for Constantinople burt engage in no combat.
- September 10. The German contingent arrives in Constantinople and engage with the Byzantines at a Skirmish in Constantinople. They depart without waiting for the French.
- September–October. Roger II of Sicily captures Corfu, beginning the second Norman invasion of the Balkans.
- 25 October. The German forces of Conrad III of Germany are defeated by the Seljuks led by sultan Mesud I at the Battle of Dorylaeum.
- October. The Christian forces of the Wendish Crusade led by Anselm of Havelberg withdraw after the Danes are defeated and the crusade is abandoned by the Saxons.
- November. The remnants of the Germany army meets up with the French contingent at Nicaea. A wounded Conrad III of Germany departs for Acre.
- 24 December. The combined crusader army successfully engages the Seljuks at the Battle of Ephesus.
- Later. Louis VII of France fends off the Seljuks at the Battle of the Meander.
- Approximate. De expugnatione Lyxbonensi, an account of the second Siege of Lisbon, is written.

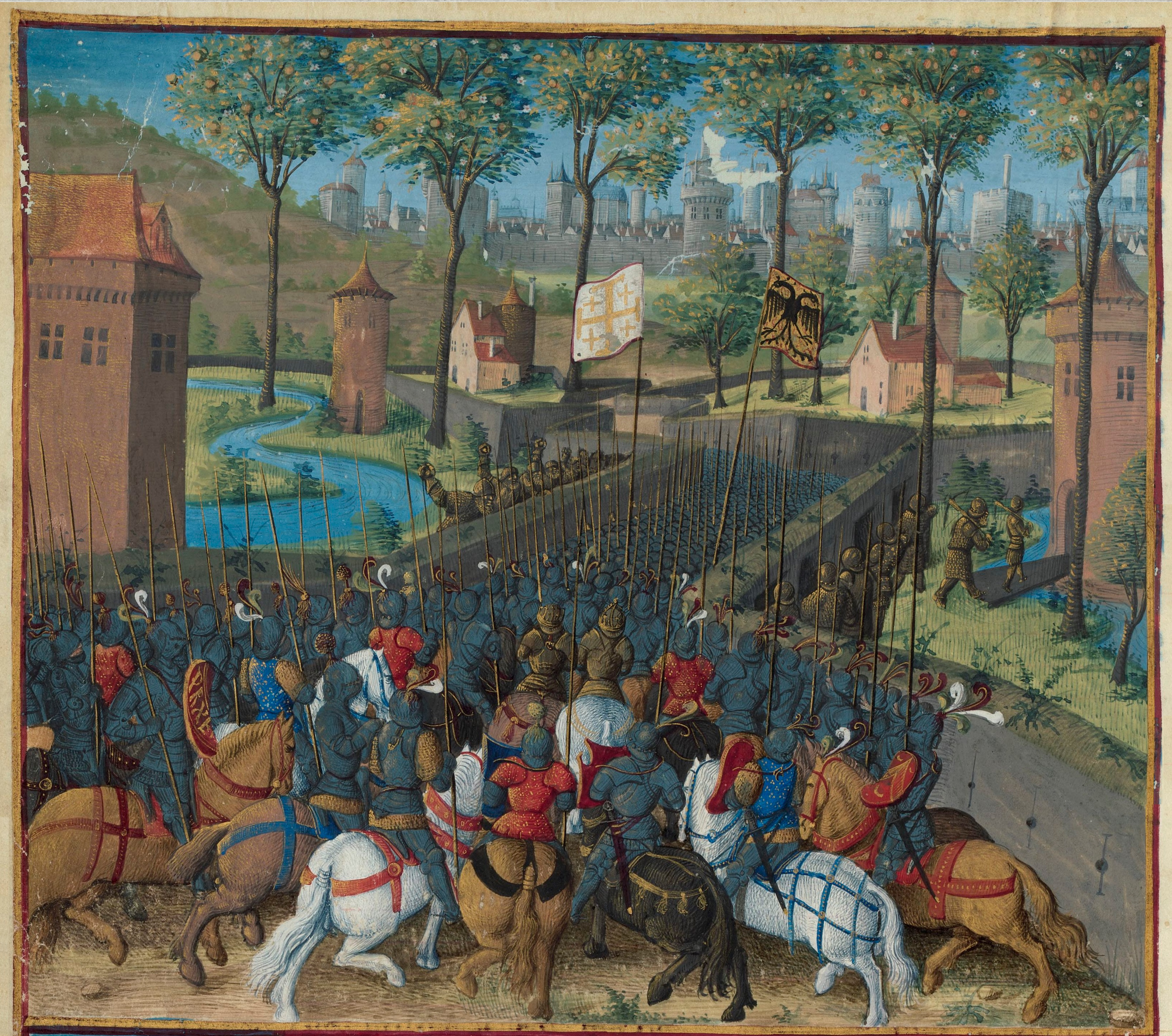
The Siege of Damascus of 1148. Miniature by Jean Colombe from Sébastien Mamerot's book "Passages d'Outremer" (1474).

1148

- 6 January. A French crusader army led by Louis VII of France was defeated by the Seljuks at the Battle of Mount Cadmus.
- 21 March – 1 April. Eugene III conducts the Council of Reims to deal with the heretics of Gascony and Provence.
- 24 June. The Haute Cour of Jerusalem meets with the Crusade leaders to determine the strategy at the Council of Acre. It was decided that the objective would be Damascus.
- 1 July – 30 December. Ramon Berenguer IV leads a multi-national force in the successful Siege of Tortosa as part of the Second Crusade.
- 24–28 July. The Crusader forces are defeated at the Siege of Damascus by Mu'in ad-Din Unur as supported by Nūr-ad-Din and Sayf al-Din Ghazi I.
- 28 July. The Crusader commanders retreat to Jerusalem, ending the Second Crusade.
- (Date unknown). Anna Komnene writes her The Alexiad that covers the history of her father Alexios I Komnenos' reign and beyond, the years from 1081 to 1108.

== The Reign of Nūr-ad-Din ==
The death of Zengi in 1146 would give rise to an even more powered leader of the Zengid dynasty, his son Nūr-ad-Din who would come to dominate Syria and, to some extent, Egypt.

1149

- Spring. Roger II of Sicily sends a fleet under George of Antioch to pillage the suburbs of Constantinople.
- 29 June. The army of Nūr-ad-Din defeats the crusaders under Raymond of Poitiers at the Battle of Inab, establishing him at the leader of the counter-Frankish forces.
- 15 July. The Church of the Holy Sepulchre in Jerusalem is consecrated after reconstruction.
- Summer/Fall. Eugene III sends Englishman Nicholas Breakspear (the future pope Adrian IV) on a mission to Catalonia.
- 24 October. Lérida falls to forces from Barcelona under Ramon Berenguer IV.

1150

- August. A Crusader force commanded by Baldwin III of Jerusalem repels an attack by Nūr-ad-Din at the Battle of Aintab. Baldwin III then evacuates the County of Edessa.
- Approximate. Erik IX of Sweden conducts an expedition to Finland in the (likely mythical) First Swedish Crusade.
- (Date unknown). Odo of Deuil, a French historian and participant in the Second Crusade as the chaplain to Louis VII of France, writes his De profectione Ludovici VII in Orientem (On Louis VII's journey to the East).

1151

- Spring. After Joscelin II of Edessa ceded Turbessel to the Byzantines, a coalition of Nūr-ad-Din, Mesud I and Kara Arslan leads to Fall of Turbessel.
- Late. Raymond II of Tripoli is killed by Assassins, the first such Christian leader murdered by the sect.
- (Date unknown). Danish nobleman Wetheman founds a lay confraternity in Roskilde organized into leidang to help fight the Wends.
- (Date unknown). Rognvald Kali Kolsson begins his pilgrimage to the Holy Land as documented in the Orkneyinga saga.

1152

- Early. Baldwin III of Jerusalem demands coronation as sole ruler of the kingdom and the Haute Cour of Jerusalem divides the kingdom into two administrative districts.
- (Date unknown). The second Norwegian Crusade led by Rögnvald Kali Kolsson begins.
- (Date unknown). Clergyman and historian John of Salisbury writes his Historia Pontificalis quae Supersunt, covering the years 1148–1152.

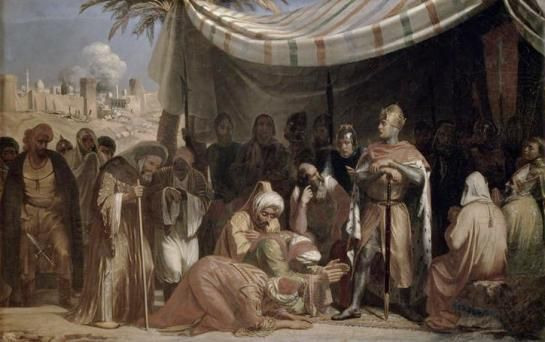
Baldwin III of Jerusalem receiving capitulation of Ascalon, by Sébastien-Melchior Cornu (1841).

1153

- 25 January – 22 August. Baldwin III of Jerusalem leads the assault on the Fatimid fortress in the successful Siege of Ascalon.
- (Date unknown). Eugene III again authorizes a crusade in Spain.

1154

- 18 April. Nūr-ad-Din overthrows the Burid Mujir al-Din Abaq to become the first Zengid atabeg of Damascus, uniting Syria under a single ruler.
- (Date unknown). English historian Henry of Huntingdon writes his Historia Anglorum (The History of the English).

1156

- 28 May. The Kingdom of Sicily defeats the Byzantines at the Battle of Brindisi.
- Spring. Raynald of Châtillon makes an alliance with Thoros II of Armenia and invades Cyprus.
- (Date unknown). The second Norwegian Crusade led by Rögnvald Kali Kolsson ends.

1157

- 19 June. A Crusader army led by Baldwin III of Jerusalem was ambushed and badly defeated by Nūr-ad-Din at the Battle of Lake Huleh.
- 12 August. The 1157 Hama earthquake damages much of the Levant.
- October. With the arrival of a crusading force under Thierry of Flanders at Antioch, the combined Frankish army attacks Shiazar whose citadel was held by the Assassins. The city is later abandoned due to internal disputes among the Franks.
- 23 October. Sweyn III of Denmark is defeated by Valdemar I of Denmark in the last phase of the Danish Civil Wars, culminating in the Battle of Grathe Heath.
- (Date unknown). Pope Adrian IV rejects the calls for a crusade in Spain made by Henry II of England and Louis VII of France.

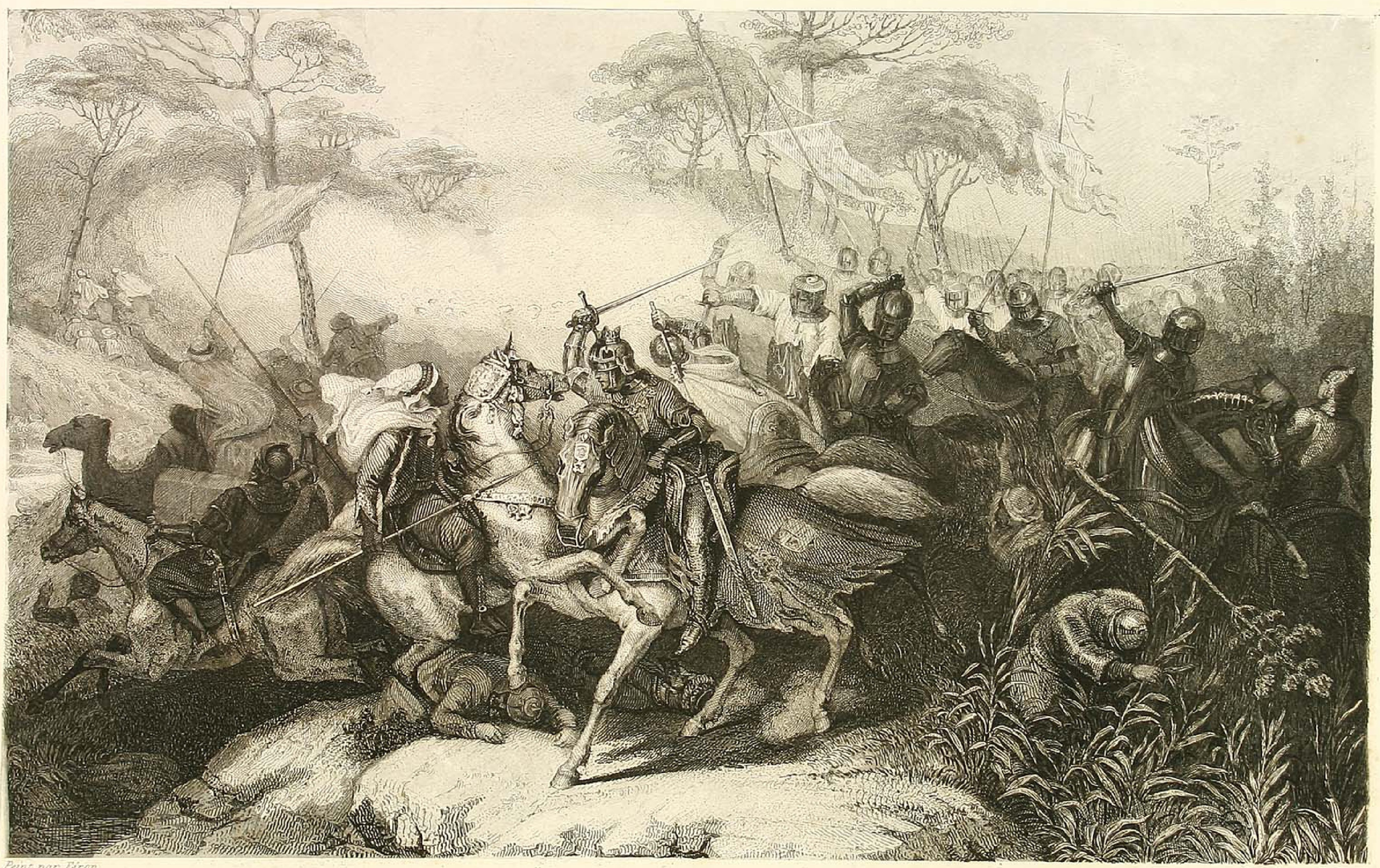
The Battle of Putaha on July 15, 1159 [sic], between King Baldwin III of Jerusalem and Emir Nur ad-Din. Original painting by Éloi Firmin Féron. The work is exhibited in the Salles des Croisades at the Palace of Versailles.

1158

- 15 July. Crusader forces of Baldwin III of Jerusalem repel an attack by Nūr-ad-Din at the Battle of Butaiha (Putaha).
- Winter. Manuel I Komnenos attacks Armenian Cilicia.

1159

- 12 April. Manuel I Komnenos enters Antioch, establishing himself as the suzerain of the principality.
- Later. Manuel I Komnenos enters into a truce with Nūr-ad-Din and secures the release of prisoners including Templar Grand Master Bertrand de Blanchefort.
- 7 September. Alexander III becomes pope.

1160

- June. Henry the Lion begins his conquest of the Wends.
- 23 July. Al-Adid becomes the last Fatimid caliph, supported by vizier Tala'i ibn Ruzzik.
- Autumn. Raynald of Châtillon makes a plundering raid at Marash to seize livestock. Upon his return, he and his retinue are captured.
- (Date unknown). The Obotrites are attacked by Saxons and Danes, resulting in the death of Niklot, and the partition of the Obotrite lands.

1161

- 11 September. Melisende of Jerusalem dies and is buried at the Abbey of Saint Mary of the Valley of Jehosaphat.

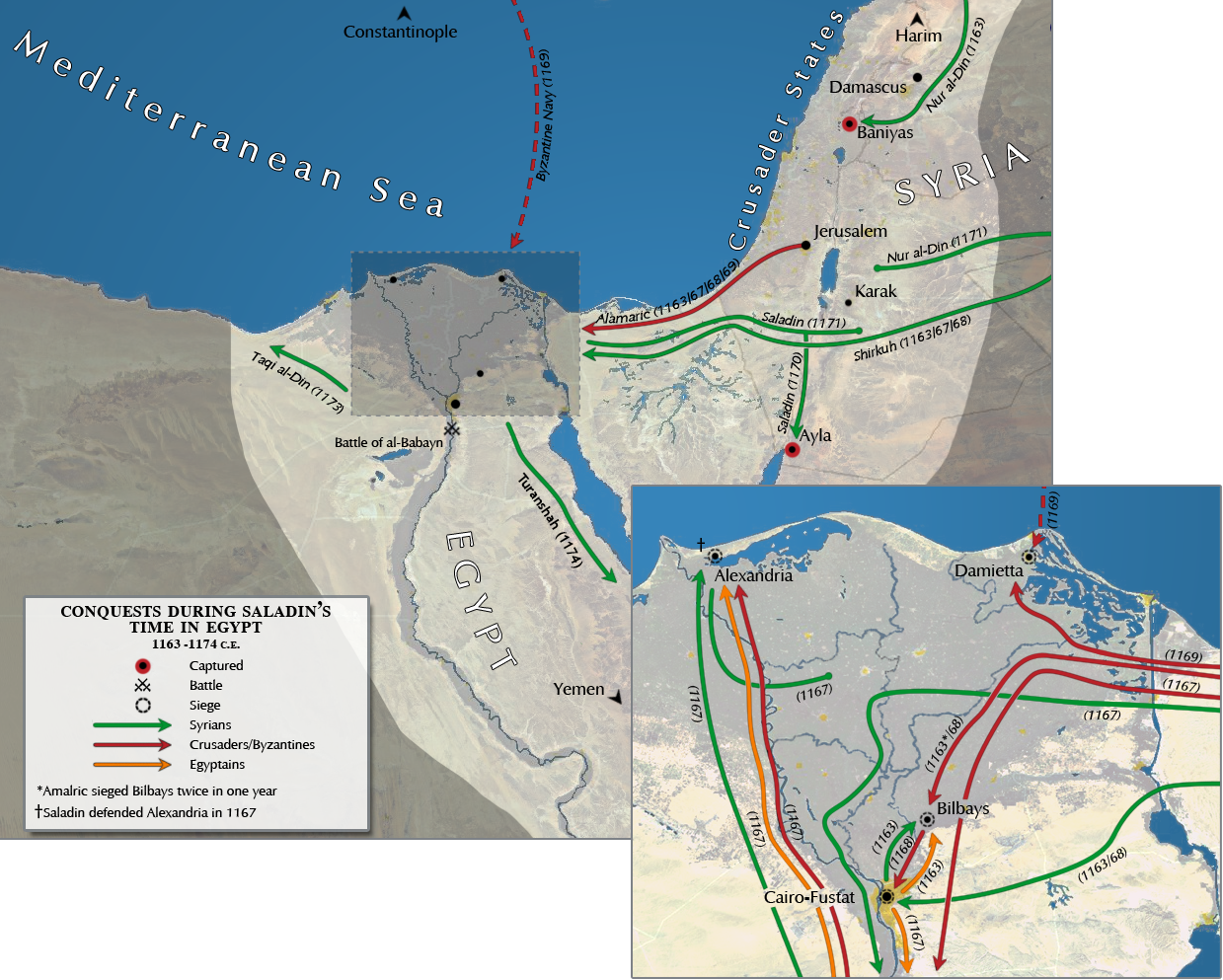
Amalric of Jerusalem leads the Crusader invasions of Egypt against Nūr-ad-Din and later Saladin.

1162

- 6 July. The Slavic duchy of Demmin is taken by Henry the Lion.
- December. Shawar becomes vizier of Fatimid Egypt under caliph al-Adid after overthrowing Tala'i ibn Ruzzik.

1163

- 18 February. Amalric of Jerusalem becomes king upon the death of Baldwin III of Jerusalem eight days earlier.
- 13 August. Dirgham overthrows Shawar as Fatimid vizier.
- September. Amalric begins the first of his Crusader invasions of Egypt on the premise that the Fatimids had not paid their yearly tribute.
- (Date unknown). Amalric of Jerusalem leads an army that defeats Nūr-ad-Din at the Battle of al-Buqaia.
- 19 May. At the Council of Tours, the Albigensians are named and condemned as heretics.
- (Date unknown). Pribislav of Mecklenburg rises in revolt against the Saxons.

== The Rise of Saladin ==
Saladin was a Kurdish officer in Nūr-ad-Din's army who would unite both Syria and Egypt under his rule, forming the Ayyubid dynasty that would threaten the very existence of the Franks in the Holy Land.

1164

- April. Saladin accompanies Shirkuh with an army sent to Egypt by Nūr-ad-Din to assist Shawar who is returned to power by August.
- 6 July. The army of Henry the Lion, assisted by the fleet of Valdemar the Great, defeat the West Slavic Obotrites at the Battle of Verchen.
- Summer. Amalric of Jerusalem begins his second Crusader invasion of Egypt.
- 12 August. Nūr-ad-Din defeats a large Crusader army at the Battle of Harim (Battle of Artah), taking many of the leaders prisoner, including Raymond III of Tripoli, Bohemund III of Antioch, Joscelin III of Edessa and Konstantinos Kalamanos.
- August–October. Shawar forms an alliance with Amalric of Jerusalem to attack Shirkuh at Bilbeis. The ensuing stalemate caused both Amalric and Shirkuh to withdraw from Egypt.
- 26 September. Alexander III recognizes the Order of Calatrava.
- (Date unknown). Aimery of Limoges sends a letter to Louis VII of France describing the events in the Crusader states.
- (Date unknown). The Archbishopric of Uppsala is created in Sweden.

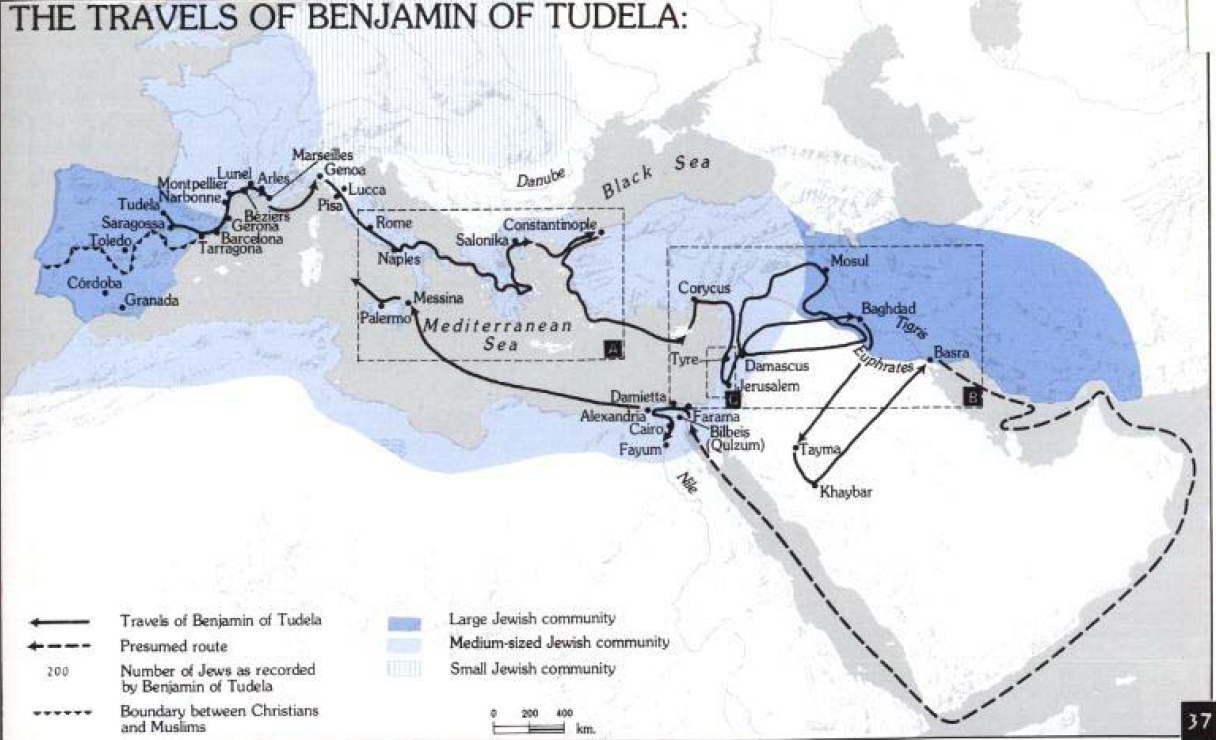
Map of route taken by Benjamin of Tudela.

1165

- (Date unknown). Bohemund III of Antioch and Thoros II of Armenia, held in captivity by Nūr-ad-Din, are ransomed by Manuel I Komnenos.
- (Date unknown). Alexander III calls for a new crusade to the Holy Land.
- (Date unknown). Benjamin of Tudela begins his pilgrimage through Iberia to the Holy Land.

1166

- September. Évora is taken by the Portuguese warrior and folk hero Gerald the Fearless.
- (Date unknown). Genoese admiral Caffaro di Rustico da Caschifellone writes the Annales ianuenses (Genoese annals) providing a Genoese perspective on the First Crusade and the Embriaco family.

1167

- January. Amalric of Jerusalem begins his third Crusader invasion of Egypt.
- 18 March.The Syrian forces of Shirkuh and Saladin defeat those of Amalric of Jerusalem at the Battle of al-Babein.
- Late March – early August. Shirkuh retires to Alexandria and is attacked by Shawar and Amalric of Jerusalem at the Siege of Alexandria. Shirkuh leaves the city in the hands of Saladin, who then enters into a truce with Amalric.
- 10 August. Shirkuh and Saladin depart Egypt, arriving at Damascus in September.
- 20 August. Amalric of Jerusalem returns to Ascalon.

1168

- 1 October. William of Tyre negotiates and alliance between Amalric of Jerusalem and Manuel I Komnenos against Egypt.
- 4 November. Amalric of Jerusalem takes the city of Bilbeis after a three-day siege.
- (Date unknown, through 1169). Valdemar I of Denmark defeats the Wends at the Siege of Arkona.

1169

- 18 January. Shawar is executed by Shirkuh who then becomes Fatimid vizier.
- 22 March. Shirkuh dies of natural causes and is succeeded by his nephew Saladin.
- 21 May. The Moors, supported by Ferdinand II of León, defeat Afonso I of Portugal and Gerald the Fearless at the Siege of Badajoz.
- 21–23 August. Saladin crushes a rebellion by Sudanese forces of the Fatimid army at the Battle of the Blacks, consolidating his power in Egypt.
- 15 October. A joint Frankish-Byzantine force begins the fourth Crusader invasion of Egypt.
- 20 October – 13 December. Amalric of Jerusalem and Andronikos Kontostephanos conduct the unsuccessful Siege of Damietta.

1170

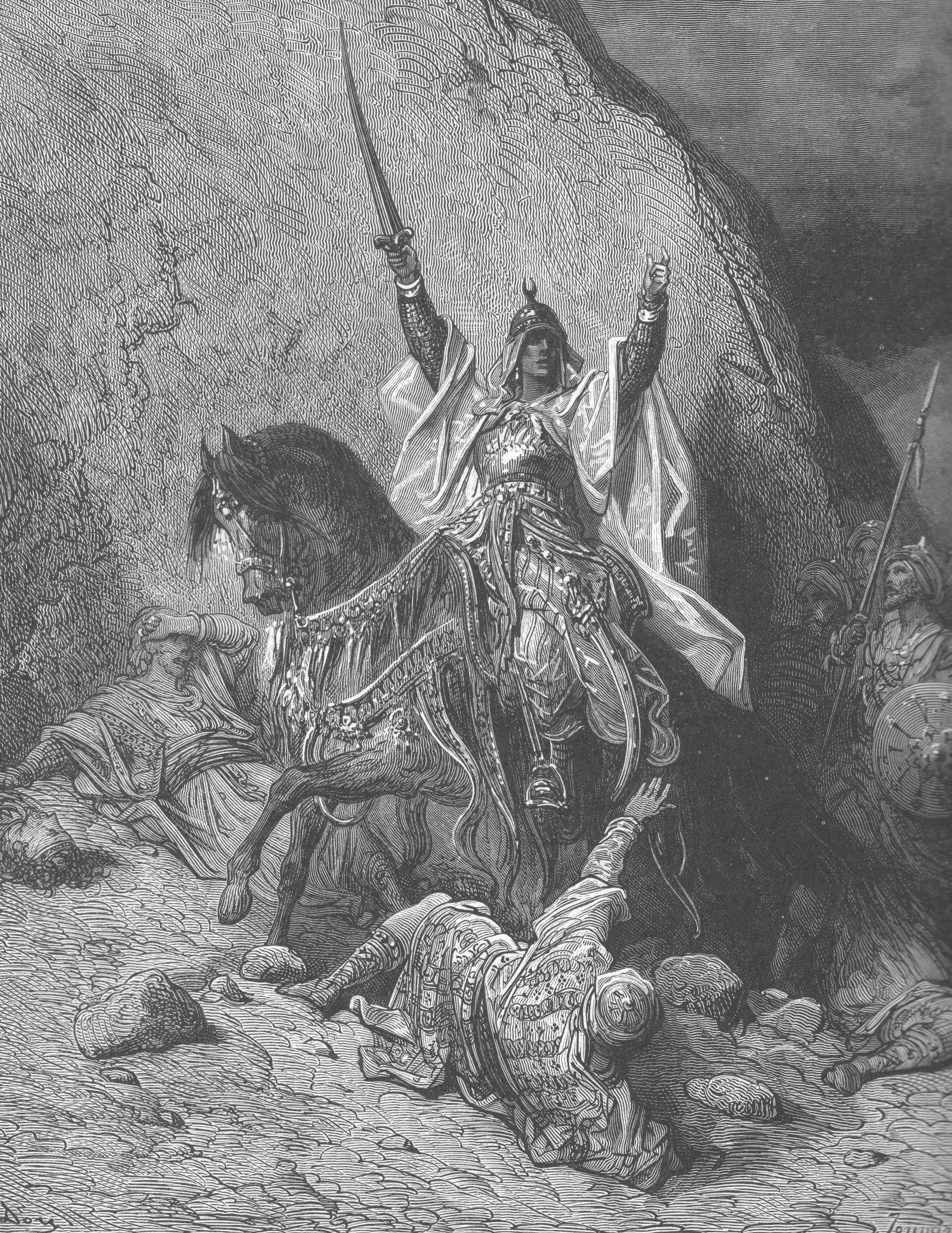
19th-century depiction of Saladin, by Gustave Doré

- 29 June. The 1170 Syria earthquake strikes with a magnitude of 7.7.
- August. Nūr-ad-Din takes control of Mosul following the death of his brother Qutb al-Din Mawdud.
- 10 December. Saladin invades Jerusalem besieges Darum on the Mediterranean coast. Amalric of Jerusalem withdraws his Templar garrison from Gaza to assist him in defending Darum. Saladin raises the siege and marches on Gaza, but is forced to retreat.
- 31 December. Saladin is successful in his Siege of Ayla, attacking the fortress at Aqaba, first captured by Jerusalem in 1116.
- (Date unknown). The Order of Santiago (Order of Saint James of Compostela) is founded to defend Christianity and expel the Moors from Iberia.
- (Date unknown). Danish forces led by Valdemar I of Denmark and Absalon defeat those of Casimir I of Pomerania and Bogisław I of Pomerania at the Battle of Julin Bridge.
- (Date unknown). German priest John of Würzburg writes his Descriptio terrae sanctae (Description of the Holy Land) after his travels to the Levant.

1171

- June. Nūr-ad-Din directs Saladin to restore the Abbasid caliphate in Egypt.
- 11 September. Alexander III issues the papal bull Non parum animus noster to promote the Northern Crusades against the pagan Estonians and Finns.
- 13 September. Caliph al-Adid dies with no Fatimid successor.
- 18 September. An Abbasid khutba is pronounced in Cairo, proclaiming al-Mustadi as caliph.
- Shortly thereafter. Saladin becomes the effective ruler of Egypt, beginning the Ayyubid sultanate.
- (Date unknown). Saxon priest Helmold of Bosau writes his Chronica Sclavorum (Chronicle of the Slavs) of the northwestern Slavic tribes up to 1171.

1172

- June–July. Henry the Lion takes a pilgrimage to Jerusalem.
- (Date unknown). The Military Order of Saint James of the Sword is founded in Portugal.
- (Date unknown). Libellus de Locis Sanctis (Little Book of the Holy Places), travelogue for use by pilgrims on their travels to the Holy Land, is written.

1173

- Late. Raymond III of Tripoli is ransomed after eight years of captivity.
- (Date unknown). Jewish Spaniard Benjamin of Tudela writes The Travels of Benjamin, documenting his travels in 1166–1172 through Europe, Asia and Africa.

1174

- 15 May. Nūr-ad-Din dies and is succeeded by his son as-Salih Ismail al-Malik under the protection of Gümüshtekin.
- 11 July. Amalric of Jerusalem dies and his son Baldwin IV of Jerusalem is crowned as king at the Church of the Holy Sepulchre king on 15 July.
- 28 July – 2 August. The Normans of Sicily are unsuccessful at the Siege of Alexandria, their attempt to overthrow Saladin.
- August. Saladin begins his invasion of Syria, leaving his brother al-Adil I to run Egypt.
- August. Raymond III of Tripoli claims the regency of Baldwin IV of Jerusalem.
- 28 October. Saladin occupies Damascus and appoints his brother Turan-Shah as governor.
- 28 December. Saladin's forces defeat those of as-Salih Ismail al-Malik at Hama and Azaz, and advances on Aleppo.
- 30 December. Assassins attack Saladin's camp and are dispatched.
- (Date unknown). Rodrigo Álvarez founds the Order of Mountjoy to protect Christian pilgrims in the Iberian Peninsula.

1175

- 26 January – 2 February. Saladin withdraws from Aleppo to Hama to await a Crusader force led by Raymond III of Tripoli.
- 17–28 March. The citadel at Homs and Baalbek surrender to Saladin.
- 2 April. Saladin agrees to withdraw from northern Syria.
- 13 April. Saladin defeats an Aleppo-Mosul force at the Battle of the Horns of Hama.
- 6 May. Saladin signs a treaty with as-Salih Ismail al-Malik in which he gains control of all of Syria except Aleppo.
- 8 June. William of Tyre becomes archbishop of Tyre.
- 22 July. Before leaving Syria, Saladin again attacks the Assassins and agrees to a truce with Baldwin IV of Jerusalem.
- Autumn. A Sicilian fleet attacks the Egyptian port city of Tinnis.
- (Date unknown). Pope Alexander III calls for a crusade in Spain.

1176

- Early. With Baldwin IV of Jerusalem's leprosy confirmed, embassies are sent to William Longsword to offer him the hand of Sibylla of Jerusalem to secure succession in the kingdom.
- After 11 April. Saladin defeats the forces of as-Salih Ismail al-Malik at Sultan's Mound (Tell-es-Sultan or Mound of the Sultan) near Aleppo. (Note: There was a total eclipse of the sun in the region on 11 April 1176. This was reported by Imad ad-Din al-Isfahani and Michael the Syrian.)
- 1 May – 21 June. Saladin captures a ring of castles south and west of Aleppo, including Buza'a, Manbij and Azaz.
- May. Bohemond III of Antioch makes an alliance with Zengid Aleppo for the release of Joscelin III of Courtenay and Raynald of Châtillon.
- 15 July. Baldwin IV of Jerusalem comes of age and Raymond III of Tripoli steps down as regent. The truce between Raymond and Saladin ends.
- 29 July. Saladin makes peace with Aleppo and Mosul.
- Early August. Saladin leads an unsuccessful attack on the Assassins' strongholds in the an-Nusayriyah Mountains after the second attempt on his life on 22 May.
- Mid-August. Baldwin IV of Jerusalem and Raymond III of Tripoli raid the Beqaa Valley near Damascus, later defeating a Damascene army led by Turan Shah at Ayn al-Jarr.
- 25 August. Saladin marries Ismat ad-Din Khatun, the widow of Nūr-ad-Din.
- Late August. Joscelin III of Courtenay is appointed seneschal of Jerusalem.
- 10 September. Saladin leaves Damascus for Egypt.
- 17 September. Manuel I Komnenos and his allies are defeated by the Seljuk Turks under Kilij Arslan II at the Battle of Myriokephalon. Militarily, the Byzantines will never recover from the loss.
- November. Sibylla of Jerusalem and William Longsword marry.
- (Date unknown). William Longsword and Raynald of Châtillon give a land grant to the Order of Mountjoy.

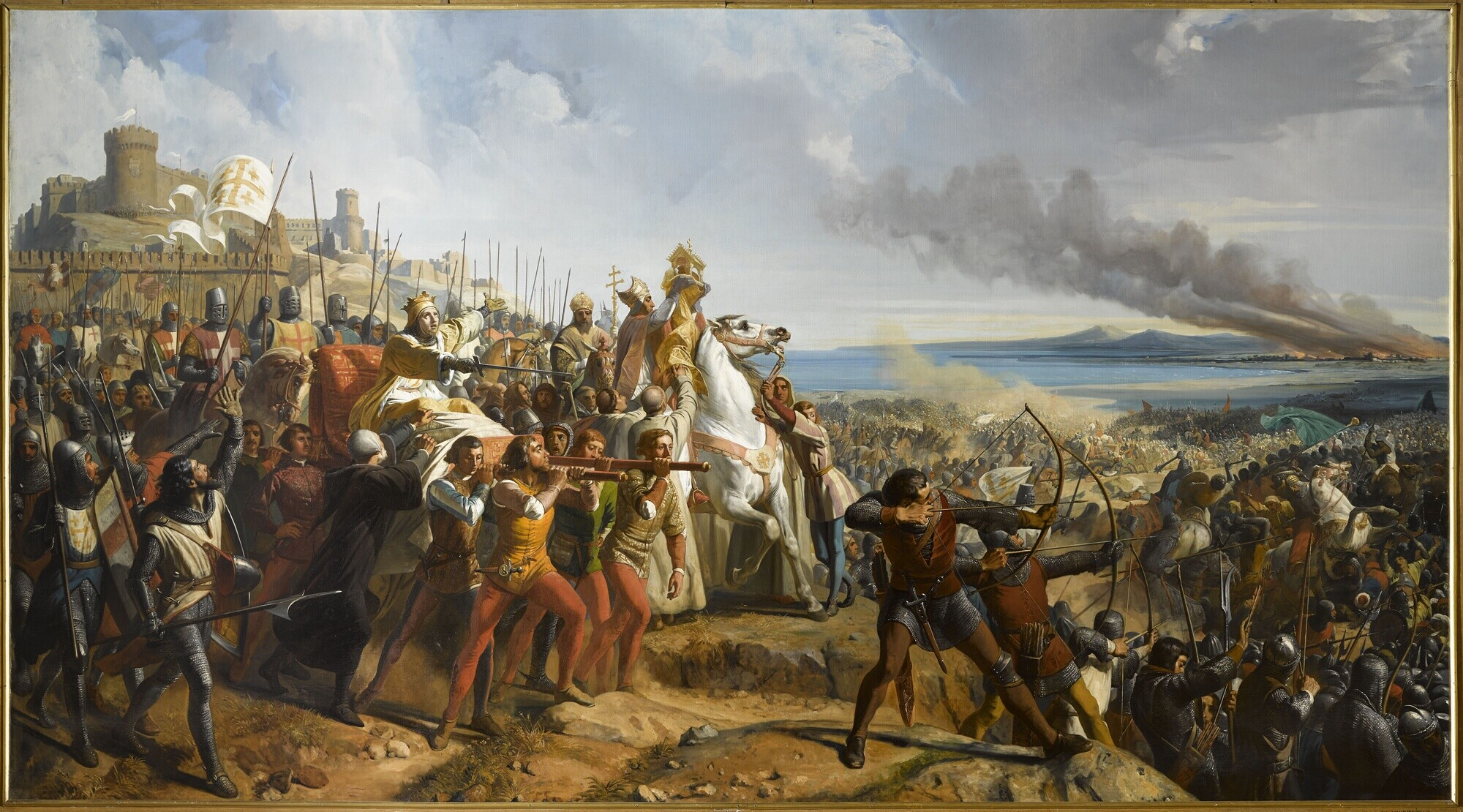
The Battle of Montgisard, 1177 by Charles Philippe Larivière, 1842–1844.

1177

- Spring. Raynald of Châtillon marries Stephanie of Milly, lady of Oultrejordain, and is granted the castles at Kerak and Montréal as well as the lordship of Hebron. (Note: The lordship of Hebron was under royal domain until 1161 when Hebron was merged with the lordship of Oultrejordain under Philip of Milly, father of Stephanie of Milly. Baldwin IV of Jerusalem granted the lordship to Raynald of Châtillon in 1177 shortly after his marriage to Stephanie.)
- June. William Longsword dies leaving Sibylla of Jerusalem pregnant with the future Baldwin V of Jerusalem.
- 2 August. Philip I of Flanders lands in the Holy Land and is offered the regency of Baldwin IV of Jerusalem. He refuses and Raynald of Châtillon becomes regent to the king.
- 25 November. Baldwin IV of Jerusalem routs Saladin's army at the Battle of Montgisard.
- 8 December. Saladin returns to Cairo with one-tenth of his army.
- (Date unknown). Alexander III recognizes the Order of Alcántara (Knights of St. Julian), founded in León in 1166.
- (Date unknown). The Byzantines destroy a large Seljuk force at the Battle of Hyelion and Leimocheir.

1178

- March. Saladin marches to relive Harem, under siege by Philip I of Flanders.
- August. The Franks break the truce and attack at the Battle of Hama. They are driven off by Saladin.
- (Date unknown). Tamar of Georgia is named co-ruler of Georgia by her father George III of Georgia.

== The fall of Jerusalem ==
The Ayyubid dynasty under Saladin began their attacks against the Kingdom of Jerusalem, eventually leading to the fall of Jerusalem in 1187.

1179

- February–March. The Byzantines defeat the Seljuq Turks at the Siege of Claudiopolis.
- March. Alexander III presides over the Third Council of the Lateran where heretics such as the Cathars were condemned.
- March. Hugh III of Burgundy agrees to marry Sibylla of Jerusalem, planning to depart for Jerusalem early the next year.
- 10 April. The Ayyubid army of Farrukh Shah defeats that of Baldwin IV of Jerusalem at the Battle of Banias. Constable Humphrey II of Toron dies of wounds inflicted in the battle on 22 April.
- April. The castle at Le Chaselet is completed and handed over to the Knights Templar.
- 23 May. Alexander III recognizes Afonso Henriques as king of Portugal in the papal bull Manifestis Probatum.
- June. Saladin defeats Baldwin IV of Jerusalem at the Battle of Marj Ayyun.
- 23–30 August. Saladin defeats Baldwin IV of Jerusalem at the Siege of Jacob's Ford, destroying the castle at Le Chaselet.
- 14 October. An Ayyubid naval force leads an Attack on Acre, withdrawing after inflicting significant damage.

1180

- 13 January. Henry the Lion is stripped of his imperial fiefs at an Imperial Diet in Würzburg for having breached the peace of Frederick Barbarossa.
- 20 April. Sibylla of Jerusalem marries Guy of Lusignan.
- May. Representatives of Baldwin IV of Jerusalem and Saladin sign a two-year truce (which excludes Tripoli).
- Spring. Baldwin of Ibelin returns to Jerusalem to discover the Sibylla of Jerusalem has remarried.
- 29 June. Sayf al-Din Ghazi II, emir of Mosul, dies.
- 24 September. Manuel I Komnenos dies and is succeeded by his son Alexios II Komnenos.
- 16 October. Heraclius of Jerusalem named Latin Patriarch of Jerusalem.

1181

- Summer. Raynald of Châtillon breaks the truce with Saladin by attacking two caravans between Syria and Egypt. Saladin complains to Baldwin IV of Jerusalem and demands compensation.
- November. Henry the Lion is deposed and exiled.
- 4 December. As-Salih Ismail al-Malik dies.
- (Date unknown). The Kingdom of Denmark defeats the Scanian rebels at the Battle of Dösjebro.

1182

- April. Andronikos I Komnenos returns from exile and instigates the Massacre of the Latins in Constantinople.
- May–August. Saladin fights the inconclusive Battle of Belvoir Castle as part of his campaign against the Kingdom of Jerusalem.

1183

- February. Raynald of Châtillon's fleet attacks Muslim targets on the Red Sea, including the Egyptian fortress on Pharaoh's Island, before being destroyed by a fleet dispatched by al-Adil.
- 12 June. Saladin takes possession of Aleppo.
- September. Andronikos I Komnenos becomes emperor upon the death of Alexios II Komnenos.
- 30 September – 6 October. A force led by Guy of Lusignan skirmished with Saladin's army at the Battle of al-Fule with inconclusive results.
- Early November – 4 December. Saladin conducts the unsuccessful Siege of Kerak, interrupting the marriage ceremony of Isabella I of Jerusalem and Humphrey IV of Toron, the stepson of Raynald of Châtillon.
- November. Baldwin IV of Jerusalem removes Guy of Lusignan from his executive regency.
- 20 November. Baldwin V of Jerusalem becomes co-king with his ailing uncle Baldwin IV of Jerusalem.
- (Date unknown). Byzantine historian John Kinnamos writes his Epitome Historiarum (Deeds of John and Manuel Comnenus), an extension of The Alexiad covering the years 1118–1176.

1184

- June–July. Abu Yaqub Yusuf crosses the straits of Gibraltar and marched inland. He was stopped by Afonso I of Portugal and Ferdinand II of León at the Siege of Santarém.
- 4 November. Pope Lucius III issues the papal bull Ad abolendam after the Synod of Verona, conducted with emperor Frederick Barbarossa, condemning heretics and calling for a new crusade to the Holy Land.
- (Date unknown). William of Tyre writes his Historia rerum in partibus transmarinis gestarum (History of Deeds Done Beyond the Sea).

1185

- Early. Raymond III of Tripoli is appointed regent to the kingdom and Baldwin V of Jerusalem by the dying Baldwin IV of Jerusalem.
- August. Saladin becomes seriously ill while advancing north of Mosul.
- 12 September. Isaac II Angelos becomes Byzantine emperor.
- 25 November. Urban III becomes pope.
- (Date unknown). A failed raid of Igor Svyatoslavich against the Polovtsians (possibly fictional) is described in The Tale of Igor's Campaign.
- (Date unknown, may be 1186). Canute VI of Denmark invades Pomerania and forces Bogisław I of Pomerania to acknowledge him as overlord. Canute and his successor monarchs of Denmark then used the title King of the Wends.

1186

- August. Baldwin IV of Jerusalem dies.
- Late summer. Sibylla of Jerusalem and Guy of Lusignan are crowned as queen and king of Jerusalem.
- October. Raymond III of Tripoli and Baldwin of Ibelin refuse to pay homage to the king and queen.
- Later. Guy of Lusignan marches against Tiberias, a fief of Raymond III of Tripoli who invites Saladin to intervene.

1187

- Early. Raynald of Châtillon attacks a large convoy en route to Cairo. (Note: The Estoire d'Eracles incorrectly claims that Saladin's sister was also among the prisoners taken by Raynald of Châtillon when he seized the caravan.)
- 14 March. Saladin establishes a base at Bosra to protect convoys.
- 26 April. Saladin attacks Kerak unsuccessfully for the third time.
- 1 May. A Frankish force led by Gerard de Ridefort and Roger de Moulins are decisively defeated by Saladin's general Gökböri at the Battle of Cresson.
- May. An Ayyubid force begins the Siege of Kerak. The Franks will abandon Kerak Castle after 18 months.
- Spring. A Bulgarian force defeats the Byzantines at the Siege of Lovech.
- 26 June. Saladin gathers his forces in the Hauran, crossing the Jordan River five days later.
- 2 July. Saladin attacks Tiberias defended by Eschiva of Bures, wife of Raymond III of Tripoli. She surrenders the city three days later.
- 3–4 July. A Crusader force led by Guy of Lusignan and Raynald of Châtillon is defeated by Saladin and Gökböri at the Battle of Hattin. Guy is captured and Raynald is executed.
- 20 September – 2 October. Saladin's conquest over the Franks is complete with the Siege of Jerusalem. The city was surrendered by Balian of Ibelin with Christians allowed to leave after paying a ransom.
- 20 October. Urban III dies and is succeeded by Gregory VIII on 25 October. (Note: Urban III allegedly collapsed when hear the news of the loss of Jerusalem, but William of Newburgh believed that the pope died before he heard the news.)
- 29 October. Gregory VIII issues the bull Audita tremendi calling for the Third Crusade.

== Aftermath ==
As a result of his victory at Jerusalem, the rest of Palestine quickly fell to Saladin. Many in the kingdom fled to Tyre, and Saladin's subsequent attack at the Siege of Tyre beginning in November 1187 was unsuccessful. The siege of Belvoir Castle began the next month and this stronghold of the Knights Hospitaller finally fell a year later. The Siege of Laodicea and the Siege of Sahyun Castle in July 1188 further solidified Saladin's gains. These gains were amplified by the Siege of al-Shughur and the Siege of Bourzey Castle in August 1188. The Siege of Safed in late 1188 then completed Saladin's conquest of the Holy Land. At the same time, the forces of Western Europe were mobilizing for the Third Crusade.

== See also ==
- A History of the Crusades: list of contributions
- After the First Crusade, 1099–1146
- Between the Crusades, 1149–1189
- Bibliography of the Crusades: modern works
- Chronology of the Crusades, 1187–1291
- Chronology of the later Crusades through 1400
- Chronology of the Crusades after 1400
- Historians and histories of the Crusades
- Medieval Jerusalem
- Saladin in Egypt

== Bibliography ==
- Asbridge, Thomas (2000). The Creation of the Principality of Antioch, 1098–1130. Boydell & Brewer. ISBN 9780851156613.
- Asbridge, Thomas (2004). The First Crusade: A New History. Oxford University Press. ISBN 9780195178234.
- Asbridge, Thomas (2012). The Crusades: The War for the Holy Land. Simon & Schuster. ISBN 9781849836883.
- El-Azhari, Taef (2016). Zengi and the Muslim Response to the Crusades: The Politics of Jihad. Routledge. ISBN 9780367870737.
- Baldwin, Marshall W., ed. (1969a). The First Hundred Years. Setton, Kenneth M. (ed.), A History of the Crusades, University of Wisconsin Press. ISBN 9780299048341.
- Baldwin, Marshall W. (1969b). "The Latin States under Baldwin III and Amalric I, 1143–1174" ( (PDF)). The First Hundred Years. Univ of Wisconsin Press. pp. 528–562. ISBN 978-0-299-04834-1. Archived from the original on 2023-01-04.
- Baldwin, Marshall W. (1969c). "The Decline and Fall of Jerusalem, 1174-1189" ( (PDF)). The First Hundred Years. Univ of Wisconsin Press. pp. 590–621. ISBN 978-0-299-04844-0. Archived from the original on 2023-01-04.
- Baldwin, Marshall W. (1985). "Missions to the East in the Thirteenth and Fourteenth Centuries" ( (PDF)). The Impact of the Crusades on the Near East. Univ of Wisconsin Press. pp. 452–518. ISBN 978-0-299-09144-6. Archived from the original on 2023-01-04.
- Barber, Malcolm (1994). The New Knighthood. A History of the Order of the Temple. Cambridge University Press. ISBN 9781107604735.
- Barber, Malcolm (2012). The Crusader States. Yale University Press. ISBN 9780300189315.
- Bariani, Laura (2003). Almanzor. Nerea. ISBN 9788489569850.
- Barton, Simon (2002). The Aristocracy in Twelfth-Century León and Castile. Cambridge University Press. ISBN 9780521894067.
- Berry, Virginia G. (1969). "The Second Crusade" (PDF). The First Hundred Years. Univ of Wisconsin Press. pp. 463–512. ISBN 978-0-299-04834-1.
- Bishko, Charles J. (1975). "The Spanish and Portuguese Reconquest, 1095–1492" ( (PDF)). The Fourteenth and Fifteenth Centuries. Univ of Wisconsin Press. pp. 396–456. ISBN 978-0-299-06670-3. Archived from the original on 2023-01-04.
- Bosworth, Clifford Edmund (2004). The New Islamic dynasties: A Chronological and Genealogical Manual. Edinburgh University Press. ISBN 9780748621378.
- Cahen, Claude (1969a). "The Turkish Invasion: The Selchükids" ( (PDF)). The First Hundred Years. pp. 135–176. Archived from the original on 2023-01-04.
- Cahen, Claude (1969b). "The Turks in Iran and Anatolia before the Mongol Invasions" ( (PDF)). The Later Crusades, 1189–1311. Univ of Wisconsin Press. pp. 661–692. ISBN 978-0-299-04844-0. Archived from the original on 2023-01-04.
- Cahen, Claude (1969c). "The Mongols and the Near East" ( (PDF)). The Later Crusades, 1189–1311. Univ of Wisconsin Press. pp. 715–734. ISBN 978-0-299-04844-0. Archived from the original on 2023-01-04.
- Cate, James L. (1969). "The Crusade of 1101" ( (PDF)). The First Hundred Years. Univ of Wisconsin Press. pp. 343–367. ISBN 978-0-299-04834-1. Archived from the original on 2023-01-04.
- Charanis, Peter (1969). "The Byzantine Empire in the Eleventh Century" ( (PDF)). The First Hundred Years. Univ of Wisconsin Press. pp. 177–219. ISBN 978-0-299-04834-1. Archived from the original on 2023-01-04.
- Chisholm, Hugh (ed.). Encyclopædia Britannica . Vol. 1: A to ANDROPHAGI (11th ed.). Cambridge University Press.
- Christiansen, Eric (1997). The Northern Crusades. Penguin Books. ISBN 9780140266535.
- Collins, Roger (1989). The Arab Conquest of Spain, 710–797. Wiley. ISBN 9780631194057.
- Díez, Gonzalo Martínez (2005). El Condado de Castilla, 711–1038. Marcial Pons. ISBN 9788495379948.
- Duncalf, Frederic (1969a). "The Councils of Piacenza and Clermont" ( (PDF)). The First Hundred Years. Univ of Wisconsin Press. pp. 220–252. ISBN 978-0-299-04834-1. Archived from the original on 2023-01-04.
- Duncalf, Frederic (1969b). "The First Crusade: Clermont to Constantinople" ( (PDF)). The First Hundred Years. pp. 253–279. Archived from the original on 2023-01-04.
- Fierro, María Isabel (2005). Abd Al-Rahman III: The First Cordoban Caliph. Oneworld Publications. ISBN 9781851683840.
- Fine, John V. A. (1994). The Late Medieval Balkans: A Critical Survey from the Late Twelfth Century to the Ottoman Conquest. University of Michigan Press. ISBN 9780472082605.
- Fink, Harold S. (1969). "The Foundation of the Latin States, 1099–1118" ( (PDF)). The First Hundred Years. pp. 368–409. Archived from the original on 2023-01-04.
- Fletcher, Richard A. (1991). The Quest for El Cid. Oxford University Press. ISBN 9780195069556.
- Fletcher, Richard A.; Barton, Simon (2000). The World of El Cid: Chronicles of the Spanish Reconquest. Manchester University Press. ISBN 9780719052262.
- Gibb, Hamilton A. R. (1969a). "The Caliphate and the Arab States" ( (PDF)). The First Hundred Years. Univ of Wisconsin Press. pp. 81–98. ISBN 978-0-299-04834-1. Archived from the original on 2023-01-04.
- Gibb, Hamilton A. R. (1969b). "Zengi and the Fall of Edessa" ( (PDF)). The First Hundred Years. Univ of Wisconsin Press. pp. 449–462. ISBN 978-0-299-04834-1. Archived from the original on 2023-01-04.
- Gibb, H. A. R. (1969c). "The Career of Nūr-ad-Din" ( (PDF)). The First Hundred Years. Univ of Wisconsin Press. pp. 513–527. ISBN 978-0-299-04834-1. Archived from the original on 2023-01-04.
- Gibb, H. A. R. (1969d). "The Rise of Saladin" ( (PDF)). The First Hundred Years. Univ of Wisconsin Press. pp. 563–589. ISBN 978-0-299-04834-1. Archived from the original on 2023-01-04.
- Gibb, H. A. R. (1969e). "The Aiyūbids" ( (PDF)). The Later Crusades, 1189–1311. Univ of Wisconsin Press. pp. 693–714. ISBN 978-0-299-04844-0. Archived from the original on 2023-01-04.
- Hannay, David McDowall (1911). Alphonso . in Chisholm vol. 1
- Hazard, Harry W., ed. (1975a). The Fourteenth and Fifteen Centuries. Setton, Kenneth M. (ed.), A History of the Crusades, University of Wisconsin Press. ISBN 9780299066741.
- Hamilton, Bernard (2005). The Leper King and his Heirs: Baldwin IV and the Crusader Kingdom of Jerusalem. Cambridge University Press. ISBN 9780521017473.
- Hillenbrand, Carole (1990). A Muslim Principality in Crusader Times: The Early Artiqid State. Nederlands Historisch-Archaeologisch Instituut te Istanbul. ISBN 9789062580668.
- Jayne, Kingsley Garland; Prestage, Edgar (1911). "Portugal" . Encyclopædia Britannica. Vol. 22 (11th ed.).
- Hussey, Joan M. (1969). "Byzantium and the Crusades, 1081–1204" ( (PDF)). The Later Crusades, 1189–1311. Univ of Wisconsin Press. pp. 123–152. ISBN 978-0-299-04844-0. Archived from the original on 2023-01-04.
- John, Simon A. (2018). Godfrey of Bouillon: Duke of Lower Lotharingia, Ruler of Latin Jerusalem, c. 1060–1100. Taylor & Francis Group. ISBN 9781472458964.
- Kaldellis, Anthony (2017). Streams of Gold, Rivers of Blood: The Rise and Fall of Byzantium, 955 AD to the First Crusade. Oxford University Press. ISBN 9780190253226.
- Kennedy, Hugh N. (1994). Crusader Castles. Cambridge University Press. ISBN 9780521799133.
- Kennedy, Hugh N. (2004). The Prophet and the Age of the Caliphates: The Islamic Near East from the Sixth to Eleventh Century. Pearson/Longman. ISBN 9780582405257.
- Kreutz, Barbara M. (2011). Before the Normans: Southern Italy in the Ninth and Tenth Centuries. University of Pennsylvania Press. ISBN 9780812205435.
- Lane-Poole, Stanley (1898). Saladin and the Fall of Jerusalem. Heroes of the nations,[v. 24]. G. P. Putnam.
- Lapina, Elizabeth (2015). Warfare and the Miraculous in the Chronicles of the First Crusade. Penn State University Press. ISBN 9780271066707.
- Lev, Yaacov (2012). "A Mediterranean Encounter: The Fatimids and Europe, Tenth to Twelfth Centuries". In Ruthy Gertwagen; Elizabeth Jeffreys (eds.). Shipping, Trade and Crusade in the Medieval Mediterranean: Studies in Honour of John Pryor. Ashgate. pp. 131–156. ISBN 9781409483120.
- Lewis, Bernard (1969). "The Ismā'īlites and the Assassins" ( (PDF)). The First Hundred Years. Univ of Wisconsin Press. pp. 99–134. ISBN 978-0-299-04834-1. Archived from the original on 2023-01-04.
- Lindholm, David; Nicolle, David (2007). The Scandinavian Baltic Crusades, 1100–1500. Bloomsbury USA. ISBN 9781841769882.
- Livermore, H. V. (1947). A History of Portugal. Cambridge University Press.
- Lock, Peter (2006). The Routledge Companion to the Crusades. Routledge. doi:10.4324/9780203389638. ISBN 9780415393126.
- Magdalino, Paul (2002). The Empire of Manuel I Komnenos, 1143–1180. Cambridge University Press. ISBN 9780521526531.
- McMurdo, Edward (1888). The History of Portugal: From the Commencement of the Monarchy to the Reign of Alfonso III. Harvard University.
- Morton, Nicholas (2018). The Field of Blood, the Battle for Aleppo and the Remaking of the Medieval Middle East. Basic Books. ISBN 9780465096701.
- Murray, Alan V. (2000). The Crusader Kingdom of Jerusalem: A Dynastic History, 1099–1125. University of Oxford. ISBN 9781900934039.
- Murray, Alan V. (2006). The Crusades—An Encyclopedia. ABC-CLIO. ISBN 9781576078624.
- Nersessian, Sirarpie Der (1969). "The Kingdom of Cilician Armenia" ( (PDF)). The Later Crusades, 1189–1311. Univ of Wisconsin Press. pp. 630–660. ISBN 978-0-299-04844-0. Archived from the original on 2023-01-04.
- Nicolle, David (2009). The Second Crusade 1148: Disaster outside Damascus. Osprey. ISBN 9781846033544.
- Nicholson, Robert L. (1969). "The Foundation of the Latin States, 1118–1144" ( (PDF)). The First Hundred Years. Univ of Wisconsin Press. pp. 410–448. ISBN 978-0-299-04834-1. Archived from the original on 2023-01-04.
- Norwich, John J. (1997). A Short History of Byzantium. Knopf Doubleday. ISBN 9780679772699.
- O'Callaghan, Joseph F. (1983). A History of Medieval Spain. Cornell University Press. ISBN 9780801492648.
- Painter, Sidney (1969a). "Western Europe on the Eve of the Crusades" ( (PDF)). The First Hundred Years. Univ of Wisconsin Press. pp. 3–30. ISBN 978-0-299-04834-1. Archived from the original on 2023-01-04.
- Peacock, Andrew C. S. (2015). The Great Seljuk Empire. Edinburgh University Press. ISBN 9780748638260.
- Phillips, Jonathan P. (2007). The Second Crusade: Extending the Frontiers of Christendom. Yale University Press. ISBN 9780300112740.
- Reilly, Bernard F. (1988). The Kingdom of León-Castilla under King Alfonso VI, 1065–1109. Princeton University Press. ISBN 9780691055152.
- Reilly, Bernard F. (1992). The Contest of Christian and Muslim Spain, 1031–1157. Wiley. ISBN 9780631199649.
- Reilly, Bernard F. (1993). The Medieval Spains. Cambridge University Press. ISBN 9780521397414.
- Reilly, Bernard F. (1998). The Kingdom of León-Castilla under King Alfonso VII, 1126–1157. University of Pennsylvania Press. ISBN 9780812234527.
- Richard, Jean C. (1999). The Crusades, c.1071–c.1291 [Histoire des croisades]. Translated by Birrell, Jean. Cambridge University Press. ISBN 9780521625661.
- Riley-Smith, Jonathan (1967). Knights of St. John in Jerusalem and Cyprus. Palgrave Macmillan UK. ISBN 9780333026601.
- Riley-Smith, Jonathan (1997). The First Crusaders, 1095–1131. Cambridge University Press. ISBN 9780521646031.
- Riley-Smith, Jonathan (1998). The Atlas of the Crusades. Facts on File. ISBN 9780816021864.
- Riley-Smith, Jonathan (2001). The Oxford Illustrated History of The Crusades. Oxford University Press. ISBN 9780192854285.
- Rogers, Clifford J. (2010). Oxford Encyclopedia of Medieval Warfare and Military Technology. Oxford University Press. ISBN 9780195334036.
- Runciman, Steven (1951). A History of the Crusades, Volume One: The First Crusade and the Foundation of the Kingdom of Jerusalem. Cambridge University Press. ISBN 9780521347709.
- Runciman, Steven (1952). A History of the Crusades, Volume Two: The Kingdom of Jerusalem and the Frankish East, 1100–1187. Cambridge University Press. ISBN 9780521347716.
- Runciman, Steven (1955). The Eastern Schism: A Study of the Eastern Churches During the XIth and XIIth Centuries. Clarendon Press. ISBN 9780198264170.
- Runciman, Steven (1969a). "The First Crusade: Constantinople to Antioch" ( (PDF)). The First Hundred Years. Univ of Wisconsin Press. pp. 280–307. ISBN 978-0-299-04834-1. Archived from the original on 2023-01-04.
- Runciman, Steven (1969b). "The First Crusade: Antioch to Ascalon" ( (PDF)). The First Hundred Years. Univ of Wisconsin Press. pp. 308–342. ISBN 978-0-299-04834-1. Archived from the original on 2023-01-04.
- Runciman, Steven (1969c). "The Crusader States, 1243–1291" ( (PDF)). The Later Crusades, 1189–1311. Univ of Wisconsin Press. pp. 557–598. ISBN 978-0-299-04844-0. Archived from the original on 2023-01-04.
- Runciman, Steven (1992). The First Crusade. Cambridge University Press. ISBN 9780521427050.
- Salibi, Kamal Suleiman (1977). Syria Under Islam: Empire on Trial, 623–1097. Caravan Books. ISBN 9780882060132.
- Setton, Kenneth M., ed. (1969–1989). A History of the Crusades. Six Volumes. University of Wisconsin Press.
- Slack, Corliss K. (2013). Historical Dictionary of the Crusades. Scarecrow Press. ISBN 9780810878303.
- Tyerman, Christopher (2006). God's War: A New History of the Crusades. Belknap Press. ISBN 9780674023871.
- Tyerman, Christopher (2009). The Crusades. Sterling Publishing Company. ISBN 9781402768910.
- Venning, Timothy; Frankopan, Peter (2015). A Chronology of the Crusades. Taylor & Francis. ISBN 9781317496434.
- Watts, Henry Edward (1894). The Christian Recovery of Spain: Being the Story of Spain from the Moorish Conquest to the Fall of Granada (711-1492 A.D.). New York: G. P. Putnam's Sons.
- Wheeler, Benjamin W.; Kreuger, Hilmar C.; Lopez, Robert S.; Runciman, Steven (1969). "Conflict in the Mediterranean before the First Crusade" (PDF). The First Hundred Years. Univ of Wisconsin Press. pp. 31–80. ISBN 978-0-299-04834-1.
- Wheeler, Benjamin W. (1969). "The Reconquest of Spain before 1095" ( (PDF)). The First Hundred Years. Univ of Wisconsin Press. pp. 31–39. ISBN 978-0-299-04834-1. Archived from the original on 2023-01-04.
- Wieruszowski, Helene (1969). "The Norman Kingdom of Sicily and the Crusades" ( (PDF)). The Later Crusades, 1189–1311. Univ of Wisconsin Press. pp. 3–44. ISBN 978-0-299-04844-0. Archived from the original on 2023-01-04.
- Wolff, Robert L.; Hazard, Harry W., eds. (1969). The Later Crusades, 1189–1311. Setton, Kenneth M. (ed.), A History of the Crusades, University of Wisconsin Press. ISBN 9780299048440.
- Ziada, Mustafa M. (1969). "The Mamluk Sultans to 1293" ( (PDF)). The Later Crusades, 1189–1311. Univ of Wisconsin Press. pp. 735–758. ISBN 978-0-299-04844-0. Archived from the original on 2023-01-04.
