= Chronologies of the Crusades =

Chronologies of the Crusades presents the list of chronologies and timelines concerning the Crusades. These include the Crusades to the Holy Land, the Fall of Outremer, the Crusades after Acre, 1291–1399, the Crusades of the 15th Century, the Northern Crusades, Crusades against Christians, the Popular Crusades and the Reconquista.

== Chronologies/Timelines ==
Chronologies and timelines that appear herein include the following.

- Chronology of the Crusades, 1095–1187
- Chronology of the Crusades, 1187–1291
- Chronology of the later Crusades through 1400
- Chronology of the Crusades after 1400
- Chronology of the Reconquista
- Chronology of the Northern Crusades
- List of Crusades (a timeline of years and duration of major and minor crusades)
- Timeline of the Kingdom of Jerusalem
- Timeline of the Palestine Region (Crusader/Ayyubid period)
- Timeline of the Seljuk Sultanate of Rum
- Timeline of the Latin Empire
- Timeline of the Ottoman Empire

== Source material ==
Chronologies and timelines appear in print as follows.

- A Chronology of the Crusades, covering the crusades from 1055 to 1456, by Timothy Venning.
- Chronology, covering 1095–1798, in Atlas of the Crusades, by Jonathan Riley-Smith.
- Chronology and Maps, covering 1095–1789, in The Oxford History of the Crusades, edited by Jonathan Riley-Smith.
- A Chronological Outline of the Crusades: Background, Military Expeditions, and Crusader States, covering 160–1798, in The Routledge Companion to the Crusades, by Peter Lock.
- A Narrative Outline of the Crusades, covering 1096–1488, ibid.
- The Crusades: A Chronology, covering 1096–1444, in The Crusades—An Encyclopedia, edited by Alan V. Murray.
- Important Dates and Events, 1049–1571, in the Wisconsin Collaborative History of the Crusades, Volume III, edited by Kenneth M. Setton (1975).
- Timeline of Major Events of the Crusades. The Sultan and the Saint.
- Historical Dictionary of the Crusades, by Corliss K. Slack. Chronology from 1009 to 1330.
- Oxford Reference Timelines: Crusades, 1095–1303; Byzantine Empire, 330 – c. 1480; Spain; Ottoman Empire, c. 1295 – 1923.
- Chronologie de la première croisade 1094–1100, by Heinrich Hagenmeyer. A day-by-day account of the First Crusade, cross-referenced to original sources.
- Chronologie de l'Histoire du Royaume de Jérusalem. Règne de Baudouin I (1101–1118), by Heinrich Hagenmeyer. In Revue de l'Orient Latin (ROL), Volumes 9–12.
- The History of the Holy War. An 1840 edition of The Historie of the Holy Warre, by Thomas Fuller, that includes a complete chronology of the Crusades through 1299.
- The History of the Crusades, a translation of Histoire des Croisades by Joseph François Michaud (translated by William Robson), Covering the period 300–1095, the Crusades from 1096 to 1270, attempted Crusades against the Turks from 1291 to 1396, and Crusades against the Turks from 1453 to 1481.

== Bibliography ==
- Lock, Peter (2006). The Routledge Companion to the Crusades. Routledge. doi:10.4324/9780203389638. ISBN 9780415393126.
- Murray, Alan V. (2006). The Crusades—An Encyclopedia. ABC-CLIO. ISBN 9781576078624.
- Riley-Smith, Jonathan (1998). The Atlas of the Crusades. Facts on File. ISBN 9780816021864.
- Riley-Smith, Jonathan (2001). The Oxford Illustrated History of The Crusades. Oxford University Press. ISBN 9780192854285.
- Setton, Kenneth M. (1969). A History of the Crusades. University of Wisconsin Press.
- Slack, Corliss K. (2013). Historical Dictionary of the Crusades. Scarecrow Press. ISBN 9780810878303.
- Venning, Timothy (2015). A Chronology of the Crusades. Taylor & Francis. ISBN 9781317496434.
