= Siege of Ayla =

1170 battle of the Crusades

Siege of Ayla (1170)
- Part of the Crusades
| Date | 31 December 1170 |
| Location | Aqaba |
| Result | Victory for Saladin |
| Territorial changes | Ayla captured by Saladin and his Forces |

Belligerents
| Kingdom of Jerusalem; Fatimid Rebels | Saladin's forces in Egypt |

Commanders and leaders
| Unknown | Saladin |

The siege of Ayla was a military engagement between the troops of Saladin and the Crusader fortress in Ayla (modern-day Aqaba). Saladin successfully captured Ayla from the Crusaders.

Ayla was located at the head of the Gulf of Aqaba, which was a key point for the pilgrimage route in the Red Sea to Mecca. In 1115/1116, Baldwin I of Jerusalem captured the position, establishing the southernmost point for the Latin kingdom. Ayla was key to stopping pilgrimage route from Egypt to Mecca. The Crusaders also built a castle on Pharaoh's Island off the mainland, allowing them to control the sea route.

Towards the end of 1170, Saladin launched a campaign against the Crusaders. On 10 December, he attacked Darum and besieged it for two days, managing to gain entrance into one of the towers. On 18 December, Amalric of Jerusalem led his forces against Saladin. Saladin then retreated and attacked Gaza, capturing the town and sacking it but being unable to capture the citadel. Saladin then withdrew his armies and headed towards Ayla. Saladin's campaign was far from over.

The attacks on Darum and Gaza were a diversionary attack against the Crusaders, as his main goal was to capture Ayla. The attack on Ayla involved the use of prefabricated boats transported across the Sinai using camels. Saladin troops were able to besiege Ayla from land and sea and successfully capture Ayla and Pharaoh's island on 31 December. Saladin had already prepared the boats before the commencement of the campaign. Saladin garrisoned the stronghold and returned to Cairo in February 1171. The success of Saladin raised his popularity and allowed him to establish his authority in Egypt.

== Sources ==
- Michael S. Fulton (2022), Contest for Egypt: The Collapse of the Fatimid Caliphate, the Ebb of Crusader Influence, and the Rise of Saladin.
- Geordie Torr (2020), The Templars, The Legend and Legacy of the Warriors of God.
- Stanley Lane-Poole (1898), Saladin and the Fall of the Kingdom of Jerusalem.
- Jonathan Phillips (2019), The Life and Legend of the Sultan Saladin.
