= Siege of al-Shughur =

Ayyubid siege in Syria, 12th century

- Part of The Crusades
Date	5–9 August 1188
Location	Shughr-Bakas near Jisr al-Shughur
Result	Ayyubid victory

Belligerents
Ayyubid Sultanate	Principality of Antioch

Commanders and leaders
Saladin	Bohemond III of Antioch

Strength
Unknown	Unknown

Casualties and losses
Unknown	Unknown

The siege of al-Shughur took place in August 1188 between the Ayyubid Sultanate led by Saladin and the Principality of Antioch, who held modern-day Jisr al-Shughur. Saladin captured the two forts, Shughr-Bakas, lying there.

== Siege ==
Saladin took the main contingent of his army and left Sahyun Castle on July 30, he reached and encamped on the banks of the Orontes River near a fortress of Jisr ash-Shughur, this castle on the heights to the west of bridge al-Shughur crossing had two castles divided by a wide fosse that cut across the spur. According to Baha' al-Din, Saladin took the detachment and assaulted the Bakas castle until it was taken on August 5 massacring its garrison and taking the rest captives, while Ibn al-Athir claimed that the castle was abandoned when the Ayyubids arrived.

Baha' al-Din claims that al-Shugur was bombarded from all sides but does not state that if stones reached the walls, leaving the defenders with no choice but to surrender. Ibn al-Athir claimed some stones managed to hit the castle but had no effect; however, the crusader position was so hopeless that the Ayyubid forces were shocked to learn that the garrison asked for surrender since the Ayyubids had achieved little in the siege and that they would have failed to capture it. After the capture of the castles, he handed them over to an emir called Qilij, whom he ordered to rebuild the fort and depart.

== Aftermath ==
After the capture of the two castles, Saladin dispatched his son Az-Zahir Ghazi to take the fort of Sarmin. He succeeded in capturing the castle, destroying it.

== Sources ==
- Conder, Claude Reignier (1897). The Life of Saladin. Harvard University.
- Fulton, Michael S. (2018). Artillery in the Era of the Crusades, Siege Warfare and the Development of Trebuchet Technology. BRILL. ISBN 9789004376922.
- Richards, Donald Sidney (2010). The Chronicle of Ibn Al-Athir for the Crusading Period from Al-Kamil Fi'l-Ta'rikh. Ashgate Publishing, Ltd. ISBN 9780754669517.
