= Attack on Acre (1179) =

1179 naval raid by Saladin

- Part of the Crusades
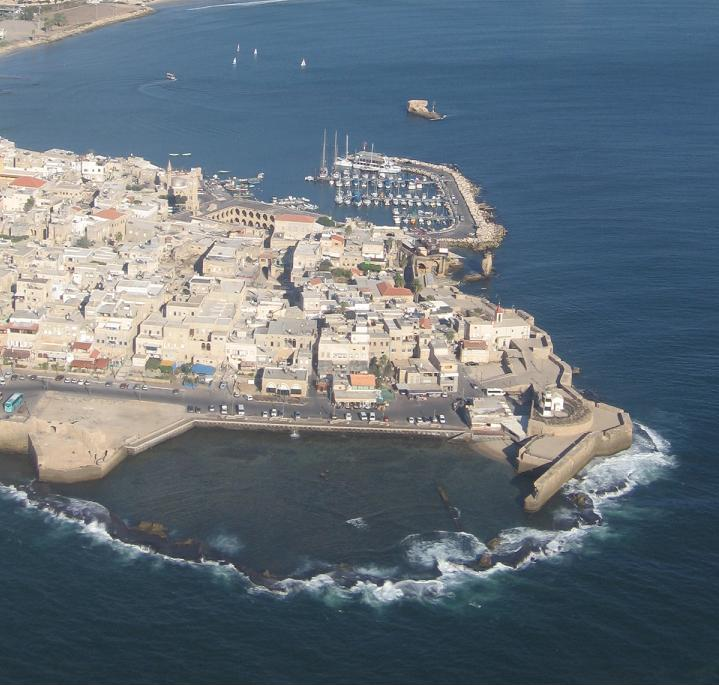
- Port of Acre
Date	14 October 1179
Location	Acre
Result	Ayyubid victory

Belligerents
Kingdom of Jerusalem	Ayyubid Dynasty

Commanders and leaders
Unknown	Saladin

Strength
Unknown	Unknown

Casualties and losses
Many ships sunk or captured	3 killed

The attack on Acre in 1179 was a naval raid launched by the Ayyubid fleet of Saladin against the Crusader fortress of Acre. The Ayyubids attacked the fort and inflicted heavy damage on the port before retreating.

== Background ==
By the spring of 1179, the Ayyubid sultan, Saladin, had constructed the Ayyubid navy. He had 80 ships; 60 were galleys and 20 were transport ships. Saladin divided his navy into two parts: 50 were to protect Egyptian coasts, while 30 of them would attack the Crusaders. The Ayyubid Navy began its operations in the same year. They attacked Levantine coasts, disrupting military and commercial activities there. In June, they captured cargo, two ships captured much loot, and 400 prisoners.

== Raid ==
Encouraged by this victory, the Ayyubids launched another raid, this time towards the Crusader fortress of Acre, which Muslims considered the "Constantinople of Franks." On October 14, the Ayyubid navy sailed towards Acre at night. Acre Port had many ships and merchandise. The Ayyubid navy managed to capture and destroy several ships. The Ayyubid navy remained at the port, destroying it for 2 days, and retreated only after causing great damage to the port. The Ayyubids reportedly lost 3 men in this attack. The attack posed a challenge to Crusader's naval power. The Muslim historian, Abu Shama, said regarding the attack: "Our fleet, once destroyed, became in turn the destroyer of the enemy...Never was a similar victory achieved by a Muslim fleet".

== Sources ==
- Hillenbrand, Carole (1999). The Crusades, Islamic Perspectives. Psychology Press. ISBN 9781579582104.
- Al-Arini, Al-Sayyid al-Baz (2022). The Ayyubids, research into the renaissance of Muslims (in Arabic). Al Masriah Al Lubnaniah. ISBN 9789777953894.
- Richard, Jean (1999). The Crusades, 1071-1291. Cambridge University Press. ISBN 9780521625661.
- Pryor, John; Jeffreys, Elizabeth M. (2006). The Age of the ΔΡΟΜΩΝ, The Byzantine Navy Ca 500–1204. BRILL. ISBN 9789047409939.
