= Armies of Bohemond of Taranto =

Italo-Norman forces of the First Crusade led by Bohemond of Taranto

The armies of Bohemond of Taranto, formed in 1097, include a major component of the First Crusade. He is regarded as the real leader of the First Crusade. He formed a second army in 1107 to defend Antioch but instead used it to attack the Byzantine emperor Alexios I Komnenos, resulting in the Treaty of Devol, codifying Bohemond’s defeat. Runciman estimates that the first army included 500 cavalry and 3500 infantrymen (plus clergy and non-combatants) and other estimates that the second army was at 34,000 personnel strength are likely greatly exaggerated.

The known members of the army, mostly Italo-Norman, included the ones listed below, as reported in histories of the First Crusade. Unless otherwise noted, references are to the on-line database of Riley-Smith, et al, and the hyperlinks therein provide details including original sources. The names below are also referenced in the Riley-Smith tome, Appendix I: Preliminary List of Crusaders. Those references are not shown unless they appear elsewhere in the text of the book. Articles that are hyperlinked to a more detailed article in this encyclopædia rely on the latter for references. Participants are from the First Crusade unless otherwise noted.

== Bohemond’s Household and Close Family ==
Bohemond likely travelled with a large contingent of servants, vassals and family members. The known ones include:

- Bohemond’s half-sister, likely Matilda, daughter of Robert Guiscard and his second wife Sikelgaita
- Guy, Duke of Amalfi and Sorrento, half-brother of Bohemond
- Mala Corona (meaning the badly crowned or ill tonsured), servant of Bohemond
- Robert of Buonalbergo, standard-bearer and constable to Bohemond. He returned to the west at some point before 1112 and was murdered in 1121 under unknown circumstances. He was buried at the Abbey of St. Sophia in Benevento. He first joined the Crusades under the Army of Hugh the Great.
- Tancred, nephew of Bohemond
- Ilger Bigod, Constable of Tancred. He commanded 200 knights in the captured Jerusalem and returned with a relic of the hair of Mary, mother of Christ.
- Robert Marchisus, brother of Tancred
- William Claret, Duke of Apulia, nephew of Bohemond (1107)
- William of Normandy, Lord of Tortosa, illegitimate son of Robert Curthose (1107)
- Hermann of Cannae, cousin of Bohemond
- Rainald of Salerno, son of William of the Principate, brother of Richard of Salerno, and so related to Bohemond.

== Clergy ==
As with all crusader armies, a large number of clergy travelled with the combatants. This included:

- The Bishop of Martirano, name unknown, who supported the election of Arnulf of Chocques as patriarch of Jerusalem, but died shortly after the fall of Jerusalem
- Gerard, Archbishop of York (1107)
- Maurice of Bourdin, Bishop of Coimbra (possibly later the Antipope Gregory VIII) (1107)
- Ralph of Caen, Chaplin (1107)
- Siger, Abbot of St. Peter at Ghent (1107).

== Historians ==
A single known historian travelled with Bohemond:

- The author of Gesta Francorum, a cleric whose name remains unknown.

== Knights and other Soldiers from the First Crusade ==
The following combatants under Bohemond in the First Crusade include:

- Ralph the Red of Pont-Echanfray and his wife. Ralph’s wife, sister of Hugh I of Jaffa (see below) died during the Crusade and he later died in the White Ship disaster.
- Walchelin II (Guascelin) of Pont-Echanfray, brother of Ralph the Red
- Ralph, Count of Beaugency, married to Mathilde, daughter of Hugh the Great, Count of Vermandois
- Bertrand of Moncontour, a follower of Ralph of Beaugency
- Richard, Lord of Caiazzo and Alife, son of Ranulf I, Count of Caiazzo
- Richard, Count of Salerno, a commander at the Battle of Dorylaeum, and also with Bohemond in 1107
- Attropius, sent as an envoy to Constantinople by Tancred
- Aubrey of Cagnano, killed during the siege of Antioch
- Bartholomew Boel of Chartres
- Geoffrey of Montescaglioso
- Geoffrey of Segre, one of the first to climb the walls of Antioch
- Godric of Finchale, Sea Captain (during the Crusade of 1101)
- Guarin, sent as a messenger to Constantinople
- Herman of Hauteville
- Hugh Lo Forcenet (the Mad), who gained a reputation during the capture and defense of Antioch
- Humphrey, son of Ralph (origins unknown)
- Pagan, a Sergeant, was the first to climb the ladder in Bohemond's covert assault upon Antioch in 1098
- Peter Raymond, Lord of Hautpoul, a leading vassal of Count Raymond of Toulouse
- Rainald Porchet
- Robert of Anzi, who later joined the army of Godfrey of Bouillon after the capture of Antioch
- Robert, Lord of Collanges, who donated his estate to the priory of Marcigny-sur-Loire
- Robert of Maule, cousin of Hugh of Boissy-sans-Avoir
- Robert of Molise, Lord of Limosano, son of Tristan
- Robert of Sourdeval, Lord of Torosse
- Ruthard, son of Godfrey

== Members of the House of Le Puiset (1107) ==
The houses of Montlhéry and Le Puiset contributed many knights to the Crusades, including:

- Hugh II of Le Puiset (Hugh I of Jaffa) and his wife Mabel
- Richard of Le Puiset, either a brother of Hugh II (see above) or brother of Hugh’s brother-in-law
- Waleran, Lord of Villepreux, son of Hugh I of Le Puiset and Alice de Montlhéry.

== Knights and Other Soldiers of the Army of 1107 ==
The known combatants in Bohemond’s army of 1107 include the following:

- Robert of Montfort-sur-Risle, constable of Henry I of England, likely the son of Hugh de Montfort, a proven Companion of William the Conqueror
- Aimery Andrea
- Gastinellus of Bourgueil
- Geoffrey of Mali
- Goldinellus of Curzay
- Halldor of Skaldri
- Hervey, son of Durand
- Hugh of Boissy-sans-Avoir
- Humbert, son of Ralph
- Josbert of Alboin, nephew of Peter, Abbott of Vigeois
- Joscelin of Lèves
- Josceran of Vitry
- Koprisianos
- Count Pagan
- Philip of Montoro
- Ralph Licei
- Ralph of Rabaste
- Renier of Brun
- Robert of Vipont
- Count Sarakenos
- Simon of Nouâtre
- Walter of Montsoreau, accompanied by Godfrey Brossard.

== Sources ==
- Riley-Smith, Jonathan, The First Crusaders, 1095-1131, Cambridge University Press, London, 1997
- Runciman, Steven, A History of the Crusades, Volume One: The First Crusade and the Foundation of the Kingdom of Jerusalem, Cambridge University Press, London, 1951
- Bury, J. B., Editor, The Cambridge Medieval History, Volume III: Germany and the Western Empire, Cambridge University Press, London, 1922
- Prof. J. S. C. Riley-Smith, Prof, Jonathan Phillips, Dr. Alan V. Murray, Dr. Guy Perry, Dr. Nicholas Morton, A Database of Crusaders to the Holy Land, 1099-1149 (available on-line)
- Gesta Francorum et aliorum Hierosolimitanorum, edited and translated by Rosalind Hill, Oxford, 1967. Latin text with facing-page English translation.
- Kostick, Conor, The Social Structure of the First Crusade, Brill, Leiden, 2008 (available on Google Books)
- Riley-Smith, Jonathan, The First Crusade and the Idea of Crusading, University of Pennsylvania Press, 1986 (available on Google Books)
- Van Houts, Elizabeth, The Normans in Europe, Manchester University Press, 2000 (available on Google Books)
- Jamison, E. M., Some Notes on the Anonymi Gesta Francorum, with Special Reference to the Norman Contingent from South Italy and Sicily in the First Crusade, in Studies in French Language and Medieval Literature, University of Manchester, 1939.
