= Ilger Bigod =

Norman knight and commander of sacred relic

Ilger Bigod was a Norman knight in the army of Bohemond of Taranto and constable of Tancred, Prince of Galilee. He fought with Bohemond's army in the First Crusade, not returning home until after 1099.

Ilger was related in some way to Roger Bigod, sheriff of Norfolk, whose son William was a victim of the White Ship disaster. He is reputed to have found a relic of the hair of Mary, mother of Christ.

After the Crusaders took the city of Jerusalem, the Christian Armenians, Greeks and Syrians who had been under Turkish rule fled to the sanctuary of the Church of the Holy Sepulchre. Tancred, respecting their religion, assured them that they would not be harmed, and appointed Ilger, the commander of 200 knights, guardian of the holy place. The native Christians confided in Ilger and guided him and his companions to the Lord's sepulchre and other sacred places. There, they showed them sacred relics that they and their ancestors had long kept hidden. Ilger then found there a small ball of hair reputed to be of that of the Virgin Mary.

Upon his return to France, Ilger shared his sacred relic among various bishoprics and monasteries. He gave two hairs to the monk Arnold of Chartres who displayed them in the church of Maule. Legend has it that many of the sick were cured through contact with the hairs.

According to Roman Catholic Saints, the relic of Mary is housed in an 18th-century reliquary in the Holy House of Nazareth, bearing the personal seal of Pope Pius VI. The reliquary is venerated in St. Mark’s Basilica in Venice.

== Sources ==
- Riley-Smith, Jonathan, The First Crusaders, 1095-1131, Cambridge University Press, London, 1997
- Riley-Smith, Jonathan, The First Crusade and the Idea of Crusading, University of Pennsylvania Press, 1986 (available on Google Books)
- Van Houts, Elizabeth, The Normans in Europe, Manchester University Press, 2000 (available on Google Books)
- Roman Catholic Saints 2011 (archive)
- Prof. J. S. C. Riley-Smith, Prof, Jonathan Phillips, Dr. Alan V. Murray, Dr. Guy Perry, Dr. Nicholas Morton, A Database of Crusaders to the Holy Land, 1099-1149 (available on-line).
