= Army of Hugh the Great on the First Crusade =

The army of Hugh the Great was formed after the Council of Clermont, led by Pope Urban II in November 1095. Hugh, son of Henry I of France, and his wife Anne of Kiev, was Count of Vermandois, de jure uxoris, due to his marriage to Adelaide of Vermandois. In August 1096, Hugh and his small army left France in prima profectione, the first army of the third wave to leave France, and travelled to Bari, Italy, and then crossed the Adriatic Sea to the Byzantine Empire, in an armada commanded by Arnout II, Count of Aarschot. When Hugh entered Constantinople, he carried a Vexillum sancti Petri, a banner given to him by the pope, Hugh being the last such noble to carry the banner.

The known nobles, clergy and knights of Hugh's army include:

- Eudes of Beaugency, Hugh's Standard-Bearer and Seneschal
- Robert of Buonalbergo, later Constable and Standard-Bearer for Bohemond of Taranto. Son of Girard (Gerard) of Buanalbergo.
- Raymond Pilet d’Alès
- Walker, Lord of Chappes
- Everard III of Puiset, Viscount of Chartres
- Ralph of La Fontanelle, a vassal of Everard III
- Renaud II of Clermont-en-Beauvaisis (later Count)
- Miles Louez, a knight
- Stephen of Aumale, son of Odo, Count of Champagne, and Adelaide of Normandy (sister of William the Conqueror)
- Walter of Domart-en-Ponthieu (St.-Valery) and his son Bernard
- Gerard of Gournay-en-Bray. Gerard's wife Edith was daughter of William de Warenne and Gundred. Hugh II, the son of Gerard and Edith participated in the Second Crusade.
- Ruthard, son of Godfrey
- Rudolf, Count of Sarrewerden
- William, likely son of Odo the Good Marquis and so nephew of Behemond of Taranto
- Conon the Breton of Lamballe, son of Geoffrey I, Count of Lamballe, and grandson of Odo, Count of Penthièvre
- Walo II of Chaumont-en-Vexin
- Gerard of Roussillon, son of Gilbert, Count of Roussillon
- Drogo of Nesle, formerly in the army of Emicho, Count of Flonheim
- William V, Lord of Montpellier.

The army of Hugh participated in numerous battles including the siege of Nicaea, the Battle of Dorylaeum, and the siege of Antioch. After Hugh's return to France, many of the knights under his command joined other Crusader armies.

== Sources ==
- Edgington, Susan, Albert of Aachen: Historia Ierosolimitana, History of the Journey to Jerusalem, Clarendon Press, Gloucestershire, 2007 (available on Google Books)
- Riley-Smith, Jonathan, The First Crusaders, 1095-1131, Cambridge University Press, London, 1997
- Runciman, Steven, A History of the Crusades, Volume One: The First Crusade and the Foundation of the Kingdom of Jerusalem, Cambridge University Press, London, 1951
- A Database of Crusaders to the Holy Land, 1095-1149 (Online access)
- Fulcher of Chartres, A History of the Expedition to Jerusalem, 1095-1127, trans. Francis Rita Ryan, ed. Harold S. Fink, 1969
