= Robert of Bounalbergo =

Robert of Bounalbergo (died 1121), son of Gerard (Girard) of Buanalbergo (d. 1086) and his wife whose name is unknown. Girard was the nephew of Alberada of Buonalbergo, who married Robert Guiscard and was mother to Bohemond I of Antioch.

Robert took the Cross and joined the First Crusade under Hugh the Great, Count of Vermandois, youngest son of Henry I of France and Anne of Kiev. He was with Hugh’s army during the Siege of Nicaea. Robert later joined his relative Bohemond as part of his army of the First Crusade as Constable and Standard-bearer. He returned from the Crusades sometime prior to 1112.

It is not known whether Robert married. Richard, Count of Acerra, is identified as a grandson of Gerard and so was either Robert’s son or nephew.

Robert was murdered in 1121 under unknown circumstances. He was buried in the abbey of St. Sophia in Benevento.

== Sources ==
Riley-Smith, Jonathan, The First Crusaders, 1095-1131, Cambridge University Press, London, 1997, pg. 101, 221 (available on Google Books)

Edgington, Susan, Albert of Aachen: Historia Ierosolimitana, History of the Journey to Jerusalem, Clarendon Press, Gloucestershire, 2007 (available on Google Books)

Jamison, Evelyn M., Some Notes on the Anonymi Gesta Francorum, with Special Reference to the Norman Contingent from South Italy and Sicily in the First Crusade, Manchester University Press, 1939
