= Ralph the Red of Pont-Echanfray =

Ralph the Red (Ralph le Roux, Raoul II Rufus) of Pont-Echanfrey (c. 1070 – 25 November 1120) was the son of either Guillaume de Pont-Echanfrey or his brother Raoul I. Ralph was a knight who first served Robert Guiscard and then participated both in the First Crusade and in the Crusade of Robert’s son Bohemond of Antioch-Taranto as part of his first army. A semi-professional soldier loyal to the family of Guiscard, he accompanying Bohemond to Apulia in 1107 and then Antioch in 1108. Ralph’s brother Guascelin (died 1109 or after) also accompanied Bohemond. In 1119, he had joined the forces of Henry I of England in his campaign against Louis VI of France, and helped Henry's son Richard of Lincoln evade capture by the French at Les Andelys.

Ralph married a daughter, name unknown, of Odeline of Le Puiset and Joscelin of Lèves. Ralph's wife accompanied him on his second crusade, dying in 1109, probably in Byzantium. Odeline was the granddaughter of Guy I of Montlhéry. Ralph’s wife was the sister of Hugh I of Jaffa, whose son Hugh II was also a Crusader. They may have had a son (unverified):

- Raoul III de Pont-Echnfrey (died after 1130).

As a widower, it is believed that he remarried, but no specific information is available on his possible second wife. Ralph drowned in the White Ship disaster on 25 November 1120, which may indicate some relationship with the aristocracy of England, particularly given his comradery with the king's son.

== Sources ==
- Riley-Smith, Jonathan, The First Crusaders, 1095-1131, Cambridge University Press, Cambridge, 1997
