= Gesta Tancredi =

Text written by Ralph of Caen relating the story of the knight Tancred of Hauteville

Gesta Tancredi in expeditione Hierosolymitana (The Deeds of Tancred in the Crusade), also known by its full title Gesta Tancredi Siciliae Regis in expeditione Hierosolymitana, is usually called simply Gesta Tancredi, is a prosimetric history written in laconic Latin prose and episodes of verse by Norman chaplain Ralph of Caen (before 1079 – after 1130). His text provides an exceptional narrative of the First Crusade and events the Crusade entailed, especially those that involved Tancred. It is one of only half a dozen firsthand Latin accounts of those events.

Ralph is largely known to history for this work, though he acted as chaplain to Bohemond of Taranto. He did not take part in the First Crusade, but joined Bohemond later, during his recruiting tour for the Crusade of 1107. He was a native of Caen in Normandy who was a student of Arnulf of Chocques, the future Latin Patriarch of Jerusalem. Arnulf departed for the Crusade in the entourage of Robert II, Duke of Normandy. Ralph was taken up by Bohemond, during Bohemond's return to Francia. After arriving with Bohemond's entourage at his return to Palestine (1107), Ralph took service with Bohemond's nephew Tancred, who ruled the principality of Antioch from 1108 to 1112.

Though Gesta Tancredi depends to a great degree on eyewitness accounts, it was commenced after the death of Tancred (11 December 1112), supposedly in order to avoid possible charges of flattery by Ralph's patrons. Later historians have criticised his work as a panegyric of the Normans, especially his patrons, on crusade, but in fact the text has far more complex nuances. The text covers the years 1096–1105. Either the text, which breaks off abruptly, has lost its final sections covering the last six years of Tancred's career, or Ralph died before his work was completed, though he lived long enough to mention the death of Bohemond the Younger, who died in 1130.

Gesta Tancredi, justified by Ralph's former intimacy with Bohemond and Tancred, focuses on the careers of the two men; it is dedicated to Arnulf. Gesta Tancredi is the most important Latin source for the Norman campaigns in Cilicia (1097–1108), and for the early Norman rule in Antioch. The work appears in Recueil des historiens des croisades, Historiens occidentaux, Volume 3.VIII, pgs. 587-710. Gesta Tancredi provides an unflattering view of contemporaneous Byzantium, in particularly emperor Alexios I.

Ralph of Caen was well educated in the Latin classics. Besides Virgil, whose work he knew well, he was acquainted with Ovid, who did not become popular until the twelfth-century Renaissance, and even Horace, who never developed much medieval reputation. More directly, in view of his project, he had read Roman historians: Livy and Caesar (in his Gallic War), whom he took as his models, and also Lucan's Pharsalia and Sallust's history. His narrative (in 157 sections) is in prose when recounting events, rising to poetry to describe Tancred's capture and despoliation of the Dome of the Rock in Jerusalem in heroic, less literal terms.
