= Odo the Good Marquis =

Italian nobleman

Odo (or Eudes) the Good Marquis (fl. 11th century), sometimes called Odobonus, was a Norman or Lombard nobleman who ruled an unknown region of southern Italy. He married Emma, a daughter of Robert Guiscard, and they had at least three sons, Tancred and William, both famous crusaders, and Robert, as well as a daughter who married Richard of Salerno. Odo is known only in connection to his wife and sons.

== Name and nickname ==
The only source to give Tancred's father the name Odo is Orderic Vitalis, who, like Ralph of Caen, believes him to be a brother-in-law and not son-in-law of Guiscard. In one passage he writes that, seeing his end coming, "the magnanimous Robert [Guiscard], duke, count, etc., called around him Odo the Good, the marquis, his sister's [husband], and other relatives and nobles". (Note: Magnanimus itaque dux Robertum comitem, etc., Odonem quoque Bonum, marchisum, sororium suum aliosque cognatos proceresque suos convocavit ad se.) When Orderic later lists the crusaders of 1096, he mentions "Tancred, son of the marquis Odo the Good". (Note: Tancredum, Odonis Boni marchisi filium.) Orderic's known erudition, and his contemporaneity with Tancred, make his testimony the best available on the latter's paternity. Only on the parentage of Odo's wife, Emma, does Orderic seem mistaken. Since Tancred and his brother William were both young at the time of the First Crusade, (Note: Albert of Aix refers to Tancred as a tiro illustris (illustrious recruit) and William as juvenis pulcherrimus et tiro audacissimus (most beautiful youth and most brave recruit).) it is unlikely that their mother could have been a daughter of Tancred's namesake, Tancred of Hauteville.

Evelyn Jamison identifies Tancred's father with the margrave Odobonus (Note: Odobono marchio) who witnessed a document issued by Count Roger I of Sicily at Palermo in 1094 and with the Odobonus Marchisus who appears in a lawsuit of 1097, now archived at Agrigento. A third reference, to Othonus, who commanded a division of Count Roger's at Taormina in 1078, may also be to Tancred's father.

Paulin Paris suggested that Tancred's father's real name was the Arabic Maḳrīzī, corrupted into Marchisus. He argued that Tancred's father was in fact a south Italian Arab and put forward as his evidence the Chanson d'Antioche (c. 1180), which calls Tancred fils a l'Asacant and fils a l'Amirant (son of the emir). This theory does not have wide support. Jamison suggests that Tancred is so-called simply because he knew Arabic.

== Rank of marquis ==
There are many sources that identify Tancred's father as a margrave (Latin marchio or marchisus, whence marquis), but do not name him. The rank of marquis was unknown in Normandy at the time and this suggests that Odo was Italian, possibly a Sicilian or Lombard, although the title was most common in northern Italy. (Note: See: March of Tuscany, March of Montferrat, March of Turin, March of Genoa...) Some north Italians are known to have settled in the south with the Normans.

Many sources also identify a brother of Tancred's named William who was also a "marquis's son". According to William of Tyre, "Tancred [was] the son of William the Marquis", (Note: Tancredum Wilhelmi marchisi filium.) but the Latin word filium (son) is probably an error by later copyists where originally it read fratrem (brother). That Tancred possessed a brother named William is affirmed by the Gesta Dei per Francos, which records a "William, son of the marquis, brother of Tancred" (Note: Wilhelmus, marchisi filius, frater Tancredi.) among the followers of their uncle, Bohemond of Taranto, on the First Crusade. In that same document Tancred is referred to only as "the marquis's son". (Note: marchisi filius.) Robert the Monk, listing the crusaders who accompanied Bohemond, mentions "the most noble princes, namely Tancred, his [i.e., Bohemond's] nephew and the marquis's son. . .", (Note: nobilissimi principes, Tancredus videlicet nepos suus and marchisi filius.) confirming his father's rank but not his name. The archbishop Baldric of Dol records, with more proper Latin, that Tancred was Robert Guiscard's grandson and the son of a marquis. (Note: marchionis filius.) He also calls Tancred's brother William a marquis (marchisus). Guibert of Nogent, expressing some doubt that he has all his information correct, says that Tancred was the son of a certain marquis, accompanied his uncle Bohemond on the First Crusade, and that his brother William accompanied Hugh the Great. (Note: Tancredum marchionis cuiusdam ex Boemundi, nisi fallor, sorore filium; cuius frater cum Hugone magno praecesserat, cui Guillelmus erat vocabulum.)

== Marriage and sons ==
There are other sources pertinent to the identity of Tancred's father, since they mention his relation to Bohemond through the latter's sister Emma. Albert of Aix, a contemporary, confirms that Tancred was a son of Bohemond's sister, (Note: Tankradus sororis filius Boemundi.) but does not mention either his father or brother. He does, however, mention that Roger of Salerno was a "son of Tancred's sister", (Note: Rotgerum ... filium sororis Tankradi.) who must therefore have been the wife of Richard of Salerno. Marino Sanuto the Elder records that Tancred was Bohemond's "nephew by his sister". (Note: ex sorore nepos.)

Two sources contradict the former, erroneously making Tancred a cousin and not a nephew of Bohemond, but do not name his father. The Gesta Francorum Iherusalem peregrinantium of Fulcher of Chartres calls him "Bohemond's cousin" (Note: Boiamundi cognatum) and Jacques de Vitry refers to "Bohemond with his cousin Tancred". (Note: Boamundus cum Tancredo cognato ipsius.)

Tancred's earliest biography, Ralph of Caen's Gesta Tancredi (Deeds of Tancred), praises him as "the most famous son of a famous lineage, [having] choice parents, the margrave and Emma". (Note: clarae stirpis germen clarissimum, parentes eximios marchisum habuit et Emmam.) He was "the son indeed of a father not in the least ignoble", (Note: a patre quidem haud ignobilis filius.) even though this father remains unnamed by Ralph and most other authors. Throughout the Gesta Ralph calls Tancred Marchisides, using the Greek suffix -ides, meaning "son of", thus "son of the marquis". Elsewhere he lumps together Tancred and Bohemond as Wiscardides ("sons/descendants of Guiscard"), (Note: Elsewhere Bohemond receives the epithet Wiscardigena, "born of Guiscard".) even though he mistakenly believed Emma to have been a sister and not a daughter of Robert Guiscard. He also gives Tancred a brother named Robert, otherwise unknown: "the Guiscardids, Tancred and his brothers William and Robert". (Note: Wiscardidas, Tancredum et fratres Willelmum Robertumque.)
