= Battle of Ceyhan River =

Battle of Ceyhan River (1130)
- Part of the Crusades
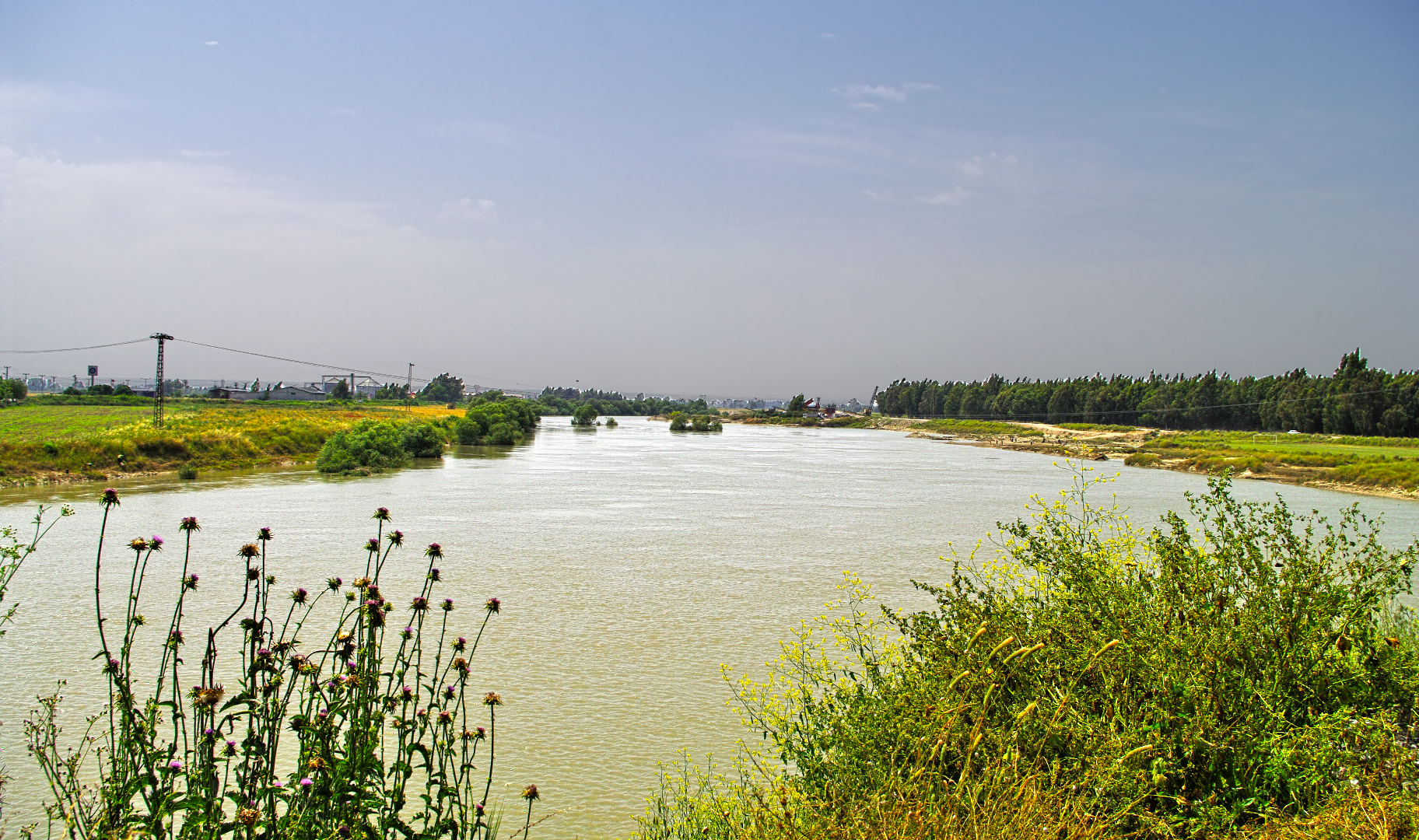
- Ceyhan River
Date	February 1130
Location	Ceyhan River, Turkey
Result	Danishmend victory

Belligerents
Principality of Antioch	Danishmendids

Commanders and leaders
Bohemond II †	Emir Gazi

Strength
200 Knights	Unknown

The Battle of Ceyhan River was a military engagement between the Crusaders of the Principality of Antioch and the Danishmendids near Anazarbus. The Turks ambushed the Crusaders and defeated them. The prince of Antioch, Bohemond II, was killed.

== Background ==
In 1130 Bohemond II of Antioch sought to regain all the lost territory of the Principality of Antioch. In Cilicia, the Crusader control was weakened. Anazarbus had fallen to the Armenian lord, Thoros I. Later, Leo I of Armenia came to the throne. Taking advantage of the Armenian weakness, Bohemond decided to invade and recapture the lost city. In February 1130 Bohemond marched with his army to Cilicia. The Armenian prince heard of the invasion and sought help from the Danishmendid Emir Gazi. Bohemond knew nothing of this alliance.

== Battle ==
The Crusaders arrived at the Ceyhan River. They encountered light resistance from the Armenians. While Bohemond was marching, an Armenian warned him of a large army of Turks nearby. At first Bohemond ignored him, but out of curiosity, he decided to scout to confirm the reports. Bohemond had a force of 200 knights with him. The Crusaders climbed a high hill to observe the situation. There, the Crusaders found a group of Turkish foragers that formed the vanguard of the enemy.

Bohemond recklessly charged at them and, although he managed to rout them, suffered catastrophic losses such that out of 200 knights, only 20 survived. The main Turkish army arrived at the battle scene. The knights encouraged Bohemond to retreat, but he refused due to the severe loss of his comrades. Instead, he charged at them. The Turks massacred the whole Crusader force, and few survived. Bohemond was killed in the battle; however, he was unrecognized by the Turks during the engagement. His head was decapitated and sent to the Abbasid Caliph.

== Aftermath ==
Bohemond's death was catastrophic to the Principality of Antioch, which was considered the peak of the Crusader rule in Antioch. Afterwards, external and internal conflicts plagued the principality, which forced it into a sort of survival mode. The Turks, however, were not able to follow up with their victory due to Byzantine intervention. Anazarbus remained in Armenian hands. Bohemond's daughter Constance succeeded him, but her rule was unpopular. The Zenigds of Aleppo took advantage of the chaos in Antioch and invaded the territory, capturing Atharib, Ma’arat al-Nu’man, and Misrin.
