= Richard of Salerno =

12th-century Italo-Norman Crusader

Richard de Hauteville
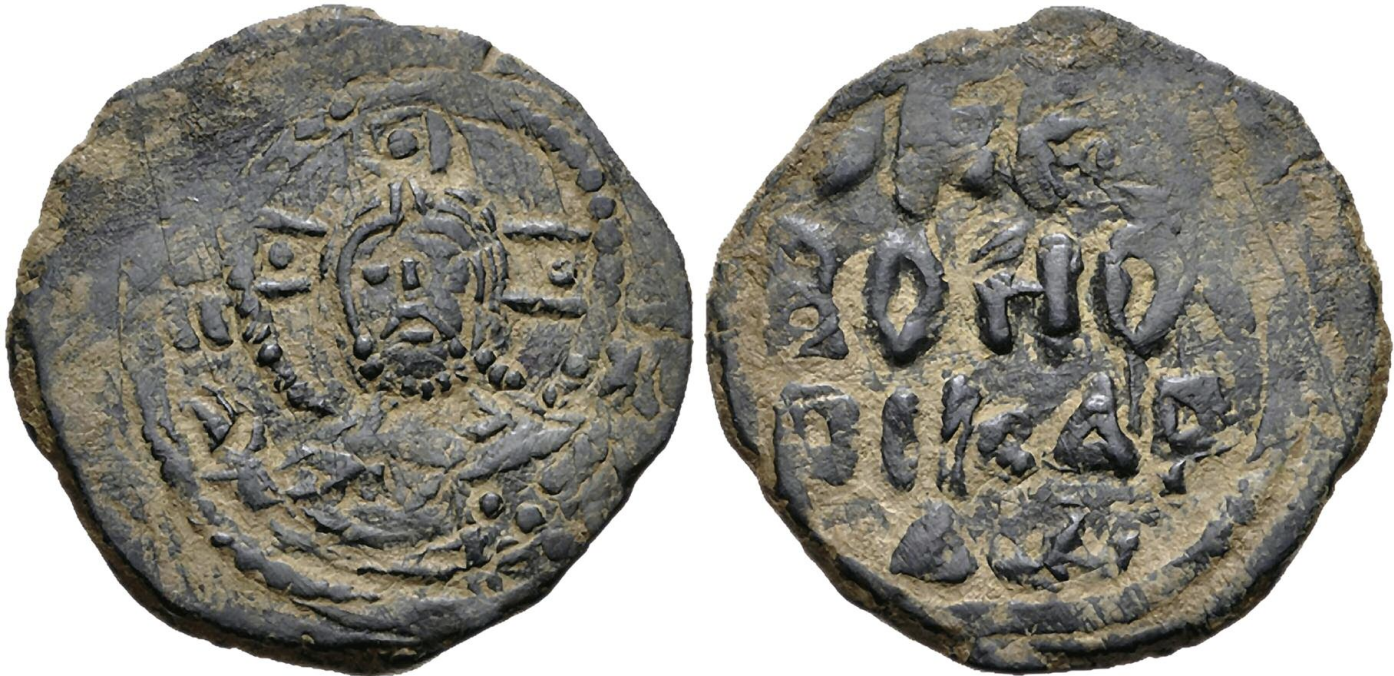
- Heavily damaged bronze coin featuring Richard's likeness
- Born: c. 1060
- Died: 29 November 1114; Marash (modern-day Kahramanmaraş, Turkey)
- Title: Regent of the County of Edessa
- Spouse: Altrude
- Children: Roger of Salerno & Maria
- Parent(s): William of the Principate and Maria of Sorrento

Richard of Salerno (c. 1060 – 1114) was a participant in the First Crusade and governor of the County of Edessa from 1104 to 1108. He was the cousin of Richard of Hauteville.

== Biography ==
Richard was born around 1060, the third son of William of the Principate, a Norman count, and Maria, daughter of Guy, the Lombard duke of Sorrento. He was also one of the many nephews of Robert Guiscard and Roger I of Sicily and in his early life Richard participated with his two famous uncles in the conquest of Sicily.

In 1097, Richard joined his cousins, Bohemond of Taranto and Tancred, in their army on the First Crusade. Richard and Tancred were notable for being among the few Crusaders who could speak Arabic, an ability doubtlessly learned during the wars in Sicily, which had a strong Arab presence. Anna Komnene relates that when Richard crossed the Adriatic Sea, his ship was attacked and captured by the Byzantine fleet, who had mistaken him for a pirate. He was soon released and joined the main Crusader army marching through Bulgaria and Hungary. Along with Tancred, Richard refused to swear an oath of fidelity to the Byzantine emperor Alexius I Comnenus, preferring to cross the Bosphorus in secret.

Richard was one of the commanders at the Battle of Dorylaeum in the summer of 1097. Richard and Tancred joined Bohemund at the siege of Antioch. Richard was among those captured with Bohemund in 1100 when ambushed by the Danishmends at the Battle of Melitene. From there Richard was sent to the Emperor Alexius I, who imprisoned him in Constantinople before he was finally released in 1103. His cousin Tancred then appointed him governor of Edessa in the winter of 1104, a city which he ruled until 1108. He was bitterly hated by the citizens of Edessa for being ruthless and greedy. During this time, Richard also acted as a diplomat, traveling to France and Italy and arranging the marriage of Bohemund to the princess Constance of France. He was a witness of the 1108 Treaty of Devol. He also participated in the ultimately disastrous campaigns Bohemund waged against the Emperor Alexius, but may have been secretly plotting with Alexius against Bohemund. After Bohemund's death in 1111, Richard retired to Marash, where he died in the great earthquake of 29 November 1114.

== Family issue ==
By his wife Altrude, daughter of Emma of Hauteville and Odo the Good Marquis, he had a son, Roger of Salerno, who later served as regent of the Principality of Antioch. His daughter Maria married Joscelin I, Count of Edessa.

== Sources ==
- Beech, George T. (1993). "A Norman-Italian Adventurer in the East: Richard of Salerno 1097-1112". In Chibnall, Marjorie (ed.). Anglo-Norman Studies XV. Proceedings of the Battle Conference 1992. The Boydell Press. pp. 25–40.
