= Tancred of Galilee =

Prince of Galilee (1099–1101, 1109–1112)

Tancred
- Marquis and Prince of Galilee
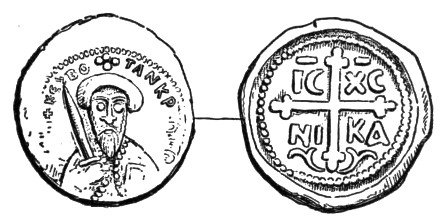
- Reproduction of Tancred's portrait engraved on a coin during his regency of Antioch

Prince of Galilee
- First reign: 1099–1101
- Successor: Hugh of Fauquembergues
- Second reign: 1109–1112
- Predecessor: Gervase of Bazoches
- Successor: Joscelin I of Courtenay

Regent of Antioch
- First reign: 1101-1103
- Successor: Deposed by Bohemond I
- Second reign: 1104-1112
- Successor: Roger of Salerno
- Born: c. 1075; Italy
- Died: 5 December 1112; Principality of Antioch (now Antakya, Hatay, Turkey)
- Burial: Church of Saint Peter, Antioch (modern-day Antakya, Hatay, Turkey)
- Spouse: Cecile of France
- House: House of Aleramici
- Father: Odo the Good Marquis
- Mother: Emma of Hauteville
- Religion: Roman Catholic

Tancred of Galilee (also Tancred the Marquis; c. 1075 – 5 or 12 December 1112) was one of the four main leaders of the First Crusade. He is credited as the first Christian to enter Jerusalem after its conquest in 1099. Present at the foundation of the Kingdom of Jerusalem, Tancred became Prince of Galilee and regent of the Principality of Antioch in the name of his uncle Bohemond I. He then married Cecile of France.

Despite his usual misidentification as an Italo-Norman, it is well established that Tancred's link to the Norman House of Hauteville was solely through his mother Emma (a sister of Bohemond I of Antioch). His long debated paternal lineage, on the other hand, has since been placed in the Northern-Italian ruling house of the Aleramids, a family of Frankish origin.

His first biography, the Gesta Tancredi (c. 1120) by Ralph of Caen, was later fictionalized by Torquato Tasso in Jerusalem Delivered (1581), followed by Claudio Monteverdi in Il combattimento di Tancredi e Clorinda (1624), by Voltaire in Tancrède (1760), and by Gioachino Rossini in Tancredi (1813), among many others. His imagined portrait has also been represented throughout European art history, including by Tintoretto, Lorenzo Lippi, Nicolas Poussin, Luca Giordano, and others.

== Origin ==
Tancred the Marquis (Tancredi Marchisio) was most likely born in Southern Italy to Odo "the Good Marquis" and Emma of Hauteville, daughter of Robert Guiscard and his first wife Alberada of Buonalbergo. Two early authors (Ralph of Caen and Orderic Vitalis), mistook Emma for Guiscard's sister, leading Fulcher of Chartres and Jacques de Vitry to conclude that Tancred was a cousin and not a nephew of Bohemond I of Antioch. Almost every other author (including William of Tyre, Albert of Aix and Marino Sanuto the Elder) consider Tancred a nephew of Bohemond, and son of his sister. According to David Crawley, this last interpretation is the most plausible considering Tancred's youth at the time of the First Crusade (much younger than his uncle Bohemond).

== First crusade ==
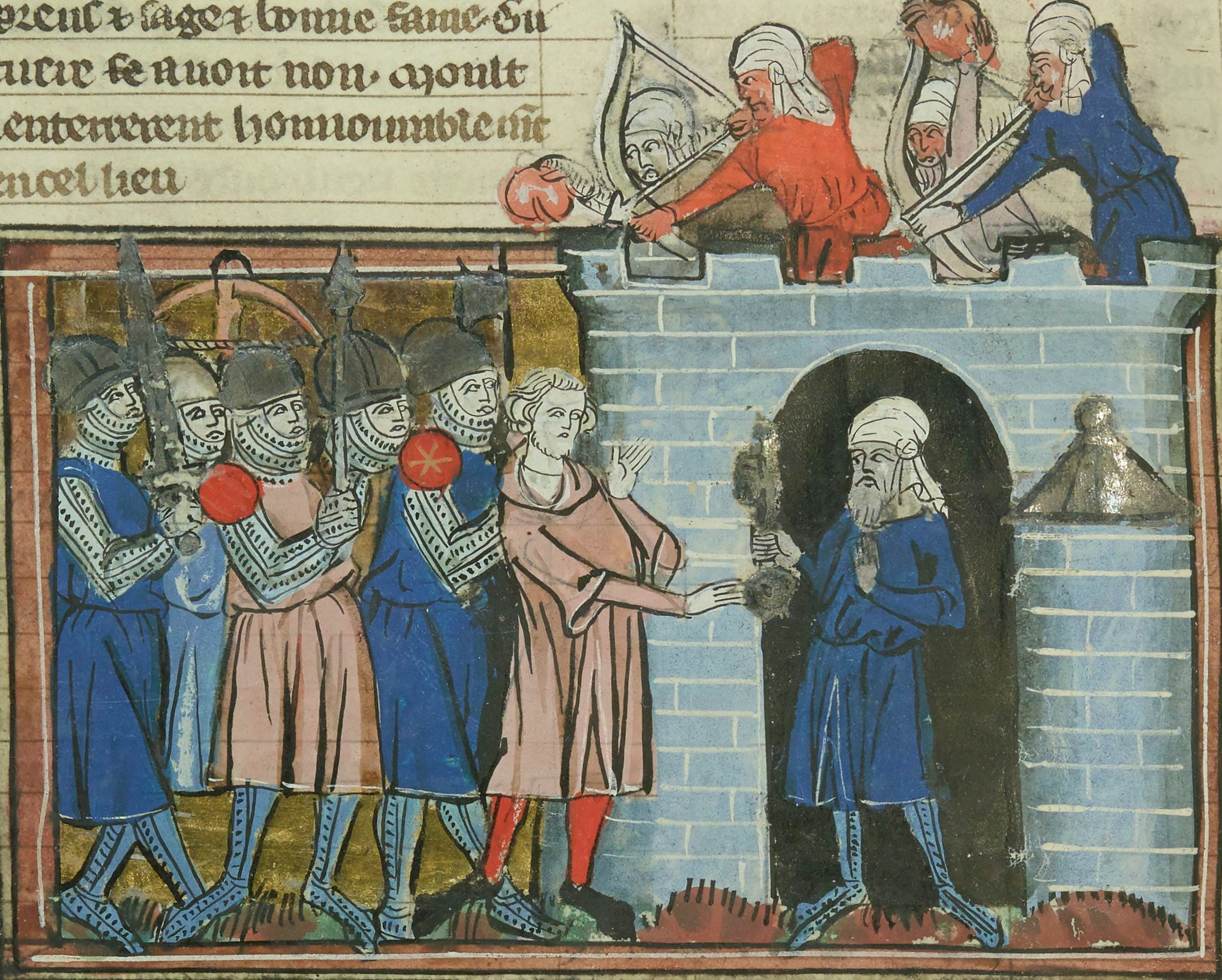
Constantine I of Armenia and Tancred at Tarsus

In 1096, Tancred joined his maternal uncle Bohemond on the First Crusade, and the two made their way to Constantinople. There, he was pressured to swear an oath to Byzantine Emperor Alexios I Komnenos, promising to give back any conquered land to the Byzantine Empire. Although the other leaders did not intend to keep their oaths, Tancred refused to swear the oath altogether. He participated in the siege of Nicaea in 1097, but the city was taken by Alexios' army after secret negotiations with the Seljuk Turks. Because of this, Tancred was very distrustful of the Byzantines.

In 1097, the Crusaders divided their forces at Heraclea Cybistra and Tancred entered the Levant by passing south through the Cilician Gates. He seized five of the most important sites in Cilicia Pedias, which included the ancient cities of Tarsus and Adana, the great emporium at Mopsuestia, and the strategic castles at Sarvandikar and Anazarbus. The last three settlements were annexed to the Principality of Antioch. During their fourteen-year occupation of Anazarbus the Crusaders built the magnificent donjon atop the center of the fortified outcrop.

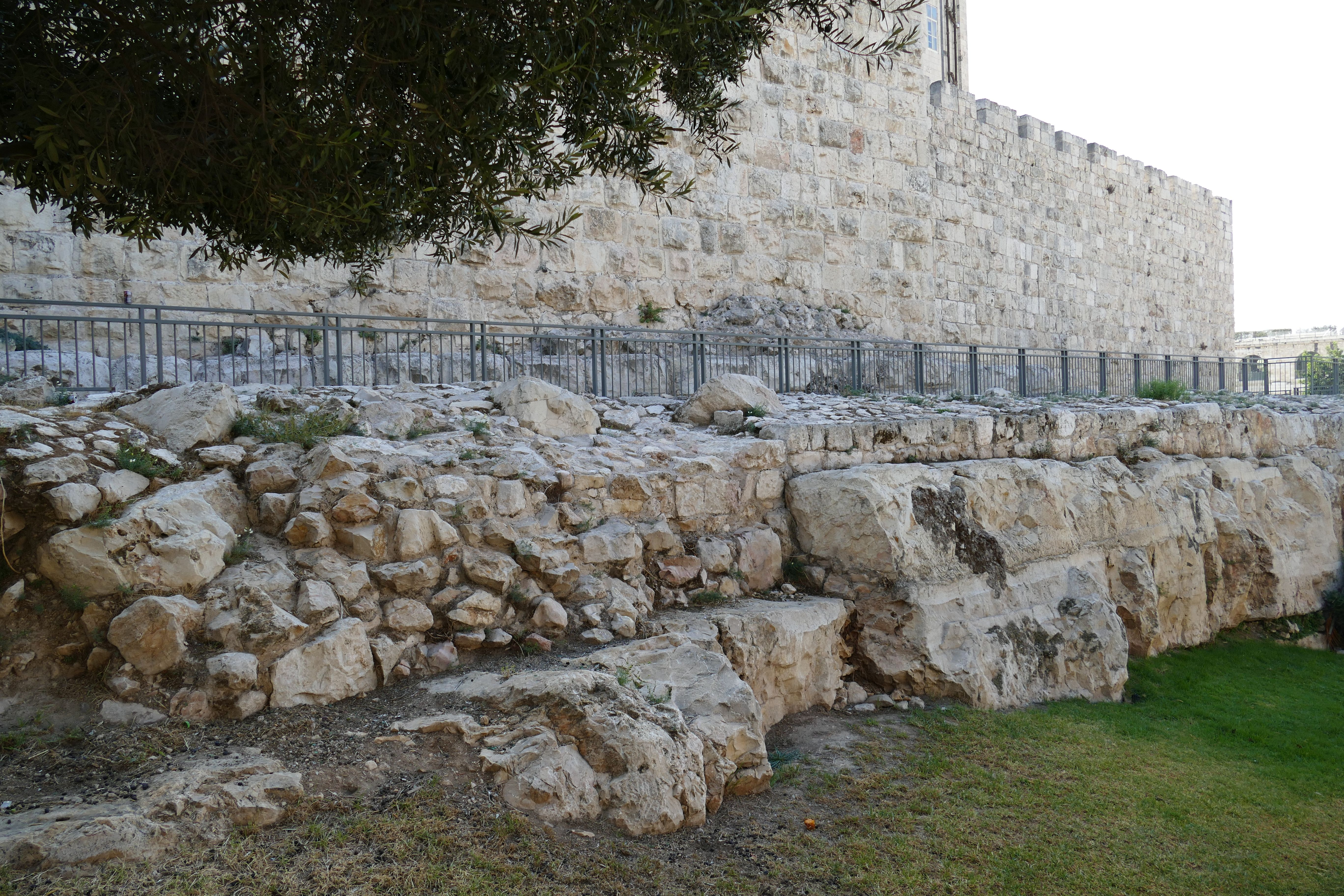
Remains of Tancred's Tower in Jerusalem

He assisted in the siege of Antioch in 1098. One year later, during the assault on Jerusalem, Tancred, along with Gaston IV of Béarn, claimed to have been the first Crusader to enter the city on July 15. (Note: Alternatively, it has been claimed that the first Crusader to enter Jerusalem was Ludolf of Tournai, who was followed by his brother Englebert.) When the city fell, Tancred along with other crusading armies participated in the sacking of the city. His biographer Ralph of Caen is cited to have said that "Tancred was one of the most active participants in the decimation of the conquered Saracens." During the final stages of the battle Tancred gave his banner to a group of the citizens who had fled to the roof of the Temple of Solomon. This should have assured their safety, but in the confusion of the moment, they were massacred by other Crusaders who were sacking the city. The author of the Gesta Francorum ("Deeds of the Franks") records that when Tancred realized this he was "greatly angered". However, his fury was calmed by the argument that the possibility of a counterattack meant it was too dangerous for the defenders of Jerusalem to be left alive.

When the Kingdom of Jerusalem was established, Tancred seized the nucleus of the Principality of Galilee, including the towns of Nablus and Baisan. Godfrey of Bouillon, now acting as ruler of Jerusalem, enfeoffed Tancred with Tiberias, and in May 1100 he devastated the lands of Sawad.

== Regency of Antioch ==
=== First regency ===
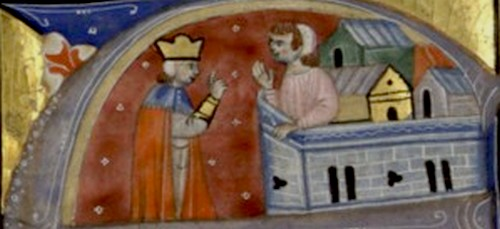
Bohemond I and Tancred in a 13th-century miniature

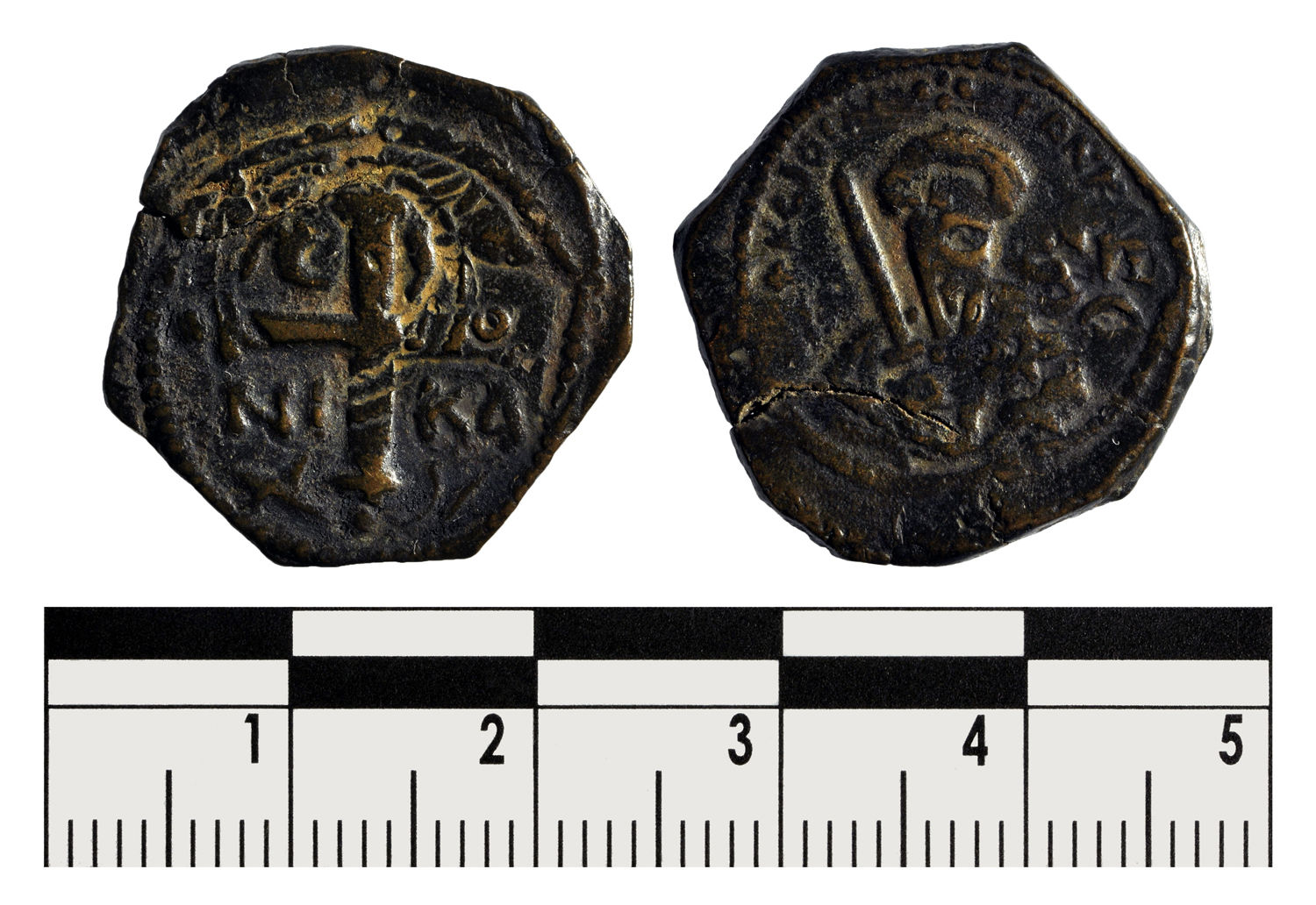
Original coin issued by Tancred during his regency of Antioch.

In 1100, Godfrey died and was succeeded by his brother King Baldwin I of Jerusalem. The commander of Antioch's militia, Baldwin of Le Bourcq, became the new count of Edessa. In August 1100, Bohemond was defeated at the Battle of Melitene. He had been hoping to gain an alliance with Gabriel of Melitene, who had sought his aid against the Danishmendids, but instead suffered an ambush and was captured alongside Richard of Salerno. By March 1101, Tancred was left to accept the regency, thus surrendering his principality of Galilee, though on the condition that it be returned if he came back within a year and three months. Tancred did not call himself "prince" but rather "servant of God" or "grand emir" on his coinage and Runciman calls him a "correct regent". His first act was to expel the men of Count Baldwin.

In 1101, Patriarch Daimbert of Jerusalem was exiled by King Baldwin and ultimately fled for Tancred's protection in the spring. After narrowly fleeing from the Fatimid forces in the wake of the Second Battle of Ramla, King Baldwin reported his defeat to the northernmost crusader rulers–Tancred and Count Baldwin–and beseeched their aid, with Tancred only coming on the condition of Daimbert's reinstatement. By the time they had arrived, the king was no longer in need of serious aid. The three instead launched an offensive towards Ascalon, but did not attack the fortress itself. Despite Tancred's efforts, Daimbert was ultimately forced to leave Jerusalem again and enter his protection.

Tancred first campaigned into Cilicia, recapturing Mamistra, Adana, and Tarsus. In either 1101 or 1102, Tancred attempted to seize control of Jabala, a port held by the Muslims south of Lattakiah, but was repulsed and the engagement may have led to the capture of an Antiochene constable. Tancred began his siege of Lattakiah in 1101. To acquire the necessary seapower, he strengthened the Antiochene alliance with the Genoese by promising them a third of the profits from Saint Simeon and half of those of Lattakiah, including a quarter within the town. Count Raymond IV of Toulouse, an ally of Alexios, travelled to Lattakiah in 1102 to relieve the town, possibly on the orders of Alexios himself, but was unsuccessful and captured. Matthew of Edessa reports he was held at Sarvandikar. (Note: Runciman reports that the purpose of the expedition was to visit his wife and children, and doubts the location of Sarvandikar.) After 18 months and an unsuccessful sortie by the garrison, Lattakiah was captured in April or May 1103.

Tancred released Raymond on an oath to never again interfere in Syrian affairs. He defeated Ridwan of Aleppo near Sarmin in 1103. Tancred's ambitions annoyed Baldwin II of Edessa and Bernard of Valence. He contributed nothing to Bohemond's release throughout his regency, less so than Baldwin, who launched a campaign the Danishmendids in 1101, and Kogh Vasil, who was probably the one to ransom Bohemond in 1103., alongside Baldwin of Edessa and Bernard. Bohemond had Tancred renounce the Principality of Antioch, including the land he had conquered.

=== Antioch and Edessa ===
Tancred receiving gifts from Turkish and Armenian satraps

In the Spring of 1104, Baldwin of Edessa suffered an invasion from Jikirmish of Mosul and Sökmen, and sent out a call for aid. Joscelin of Turbessel, Tancred, and Bohemond responded, and the four leaders moved on Harran. Before battle took place, cohesion already began to break down due to a dispute over the ownership of Harran. The Franks were led into a trap and decisively defeated, with Baldwin and Joscelin being captured. Bohemond and Tancred then entered Edessa to organize its defence, where the remaining knights led by Archbishop Benedict gave the regency to Tancred. Tancred agreed, leading a defence with what forces could be gathered.

Tancred was able to rebuild the defences of Edessa in the face of an attack led by Jikirmish, owed both to a successful sortie and urgent relief from Bohemond. Tancred captured a noblewoman from the emir's household in the fighting, and Jikirmish offered either 15,000 bezants or Baldwin himself for her release and return. Tancred, who knew Baldwin's return would deprive him of Edessa, accepted the money. While the crisis in Edessa was addressed rapidly, Much of the Principality of Antioch was lost wholesale to a fresh invasion from Ridwan of Aleppo, who seized Maarat, Albara, Sarmin, and many minor castles were lost to the Aleppans. In addition, most of Cilicia fell to the Byzantines, including Mamistra, Adana, and Tarsus.

During this time, Bohemond left Antioch for Italy, alongside Daimbert of Pisa, to prepare for an ultimately unsuccessful invasion of the Byzantine Empire, while depriving Antioch of considerable military resources. Tancred, thus, assumed the regency of Antioch and was left to develop the principality as he wished. Richard of Salerno was appointed as Tancred's governor in Edessa. In the Spring of 1105, Artah expelled its Latin garrison and aligned itself with Ridwan. Tancred raised all of the forces that were available and met Ridwan in battle near Artah, defeating his army around the 20th of April. Tancred then recaptured Artah and restored the principality's borders throughout 1105, forcing Ridwan into a truce and eventual alliance.

In February 1106, the Armenians of Apamea invited Tancred to rule the town after the assassination if its ruler by his successor, Abu-l-Fath and Ridwan of Aleppo. By the time Tancred arrived, however, the situation had changed, and his three-week-long siege was unsuccessful. He returned to Apamea in the Autumn with the aid of Musibh ibn Mula'ib, the son of the late ruler, and after a renewed siege the town surrendered, with Musibh and his brother being appointed to posts within the town. By 1108, Tancred seems to have recovered Lattakiah, and from 1106 to 1107, launched a campaign into Cilicia, but lost said Cilician gains by 1108.

=== Conflicts ===
Baldwin returned to Edessa in the Summer of 1108 after having been partially ransomed by Joscelin (released 1107) from Jawali Saqawa. Baldwin travelled to Edessa, where Tancred agreed to grant him the 30,000 dinars needed to pay off Jawali, but refused to return Edessa to him unless Baldwin paid homage. Baldwin refused, instead travelling to Turbessel. As seen by historian Robert Nicholson, Tancred's "selfishness blinded him to the fact that, he and Baldwin of Le Bourcq, by taking the side of the rebel Jawali, could deal the Seljukid power a dangerous blow". Tancred advanced on Baldwin, but after a short truce and as the Armenian nobles flocked to Baldwin's banner, Tancred was forced to relinquish Edessa, recalling Richard of Salerno on September 18.

The truce did not last long. In response to Baldwin and Joscelin's alliance with Jawali, Tancred joined with Ridwan of Aleppo, and the two sides clashed near Turbessel, where the Edessenes were routed. Tancred besieged Joscelin for a short time at Duluk, but was quickly driven off. Tancred's next action was against Shaizar, but after some success he was bought off by the citizens. After Bertrand of Tripoli came to the Levant in March 1109 he feuded with his brother William Jordan over the patrimony of their father, Raymond of Tripoli, in the Levant. William Jordan paid homage to Tancred in exchange for his support, while Bertrand sought aid from Baldwin of Jerusalem.

King Baldwin summoned all of the leaders to settle the question of Raymond's inheritance as well as the dispute in the County of Edessa. Though William Jordan urged Tancred to refuse, he considered it impractical, and obliged. Tancred, Joscelin, Baldwin of Edessa, and Bertrand attended the meeting. William Jordan was alotted Tortosa and Arqa, and Bertrand was promised Tripoli and Jebail, although William's murder soon afterwards left Bertrand his lands in any case. In exchange for Tancred reconciling with Baldwin le Bourcq and returning his lands, Baldwin of Jerusalem restored to Tancred the Principality of Galilee, for which Tancred became the king's vassal.

=== Last years ===
The crusader states at their territorial peak around 1135. Antioch and Edessa are in blue and yellow respectively.

Bohemond's invasion of the Byzantine Balkans was unsuccessful. After some mishaps, he was forced to sign the Treaty of Devol, in which he agreed to rule Antioch as a vassal of Constantinople. Bohemond did not return to Cilicia, and instead the established Tancred saw it as a small matter to violate the treaty entirely. His ambitions in Cilicia continued, and between 1109 and 1111 he finally conquered the whole of Cilicia.

In the same year, shortly after the Capture of Tripoli he seized Baniyas. Tancred also besieged Jabala, and the emir only agreed to surrender on the condition that he hold the town as a fief, but Tancred broke his word and exiled him. In 1110, he brought Krak des Chevaliers under his control, which would later become an important castle in the County of Tripoli. Tancred remained the regent of Antioch for Bohemond II until his death in 1112 during a typhoid epidemic. He had married Cecile of France, but died childless. Tancred was buried in the porch of St. Peter, the cathedral of Antioch.

The Gesta Tancredi is a biography of Tancred written in Latin by Ralph of Caen, a Norman who joined the First Crusade and served under Tancred and Bohemond. An English translation was co-published in 2005 by Bernard S. Bachrach and David S. Bachrach.

== Ancestry dispute ==
In regards to Tancred's father, Crawley unfortunately uses an outdated transcription of William of Tyre's text, making Tancred a son of "William the Marquis" (Tancredus Willelmi Marchionis filius). This version was later corrected by the 17th-century philologist Sebastiano Paoli, who proposed the transcription of Tancredus, Willelmi Marchionis frater (meaning Tancred was the brother and not the son of "William the Marquis"), in accordance with the contemporary statements of Baldric of Dol (Guillelmus Marchisius, Tancred frater) and Guibert of Nogent (Wilhelmus, Marchisi filius, frater Tancredi). Nogent even goes as far as to say that while Tancred followed his uncle Bohemond, his brother William followed Hugh "the Great" of Vermandois (Tancredum Marchionis cuiusdam ex Boemundi, nisi fallor, sorore filium; cuius frater cum Hugone Magno praecesserat, cui Guillelmus erat vocabulum). Most contemporary authors agree that Tancredi Marchisius was a Marquis (Marchisus dictus est in the Historia belli sacri), brother of William the Marquis (Guillelmus Marchisius, Tancred frater in Baldric of Dol) and a son of a Marquis (marchisi filius in Robert the Monk and Guibert of Nogent, and Marchisides in Ralph of Caen). Only Orderic Vitalis names Tancred's father as Odo "the Good Marquis" (Tancredum, Odonis Boni Marchisi filium).

Ralph of Caen also states that Tancred belonged to "a most prestigious lineage" and had "excellent parents, the Marquis and Emma" (clarae stirpis germen clarissimum, parentes eximios Marchisum habuit et Emmam). Modern and contemporary scholars have long debated the origin of Odo "the Good Marquis", mostly agreeing that the title of marquis was unknown to the Normans (Sebastiano Paoli) and must therefore have proceeded from a Northern-Italian root (Ludovico Muratori). Vittorio Poggi and Edoardo d'Angelo both agreed that it would be wiser to trace him in the North-Italian Frankish dynasty of the Aleramids, whose senior line of Savona recurrently married to the Hautevilles during the 12th century (e.g. Adelaide del Vasto and Enrico del Vasto). Following this theory, Crawley attempts to find an equivalent to Otto "the Good Marquis" but only searches in the cadet branch of Monferrato. It is Claudio Martinotti Doria who first manages to identify Tancred's father with the Aleramid Marquis Otto IV of Savona, son of Otto III and brother of both Boniface del Vasto and Manfred I (father of Adelaide and Enrico). These findings concur with Evelyn Jamison's arguments stating that "the Good Marquis" was the same Otto (or Ottone) who commanded a division of Roger I's troops in Taormina in 1078, and only later was styled Ottobonus, or "Otto the Good", since at least 1094.

== Character ==
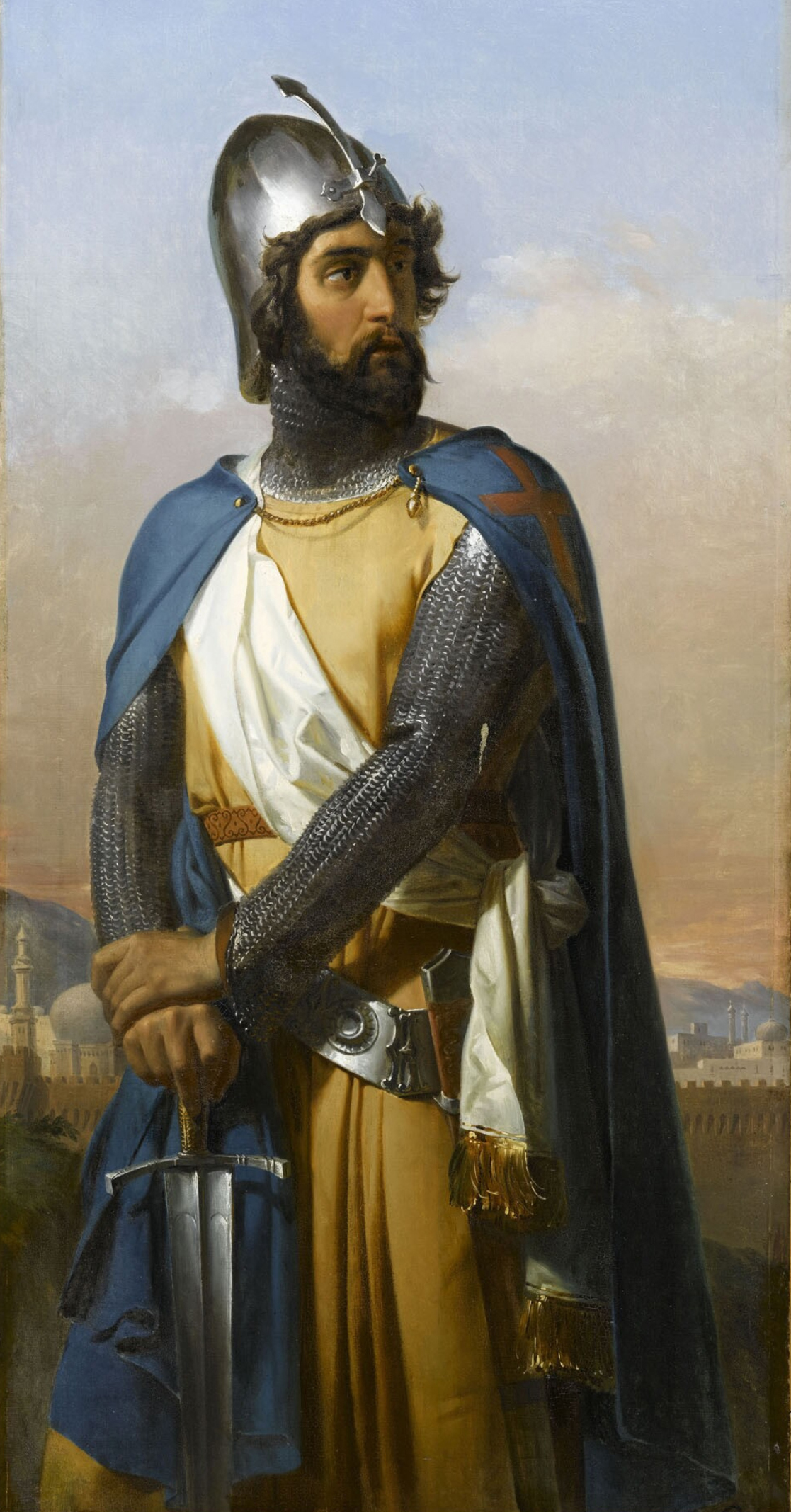
Tancred by Merry-Joseph Blondel (Palace of Versaille)

Ralph of Caen details Tancred's personality in his chronicle and biography of him in the Gesta Tancredi. Ralph notes how Tancred was well aware of the innate sinfulness of the knightly profession and the violence it entailed, and how this led him to give up his life in Norman-dominated southern Italy to take part in Pope Urban II's call for an armed pilgrimage to the Holy Land. Tancred is described by Ralph as a very pious, violent hawk of a man. He was a shrewd, opportunistic warrior bred for conquest with a combative nature, but it also showcases a very pragmatic side of him concerning the even distribution among his men of the plunder gained following the despoliation of the mosques of Jerusalem after the city's conquest by the Crusaders in 1099.

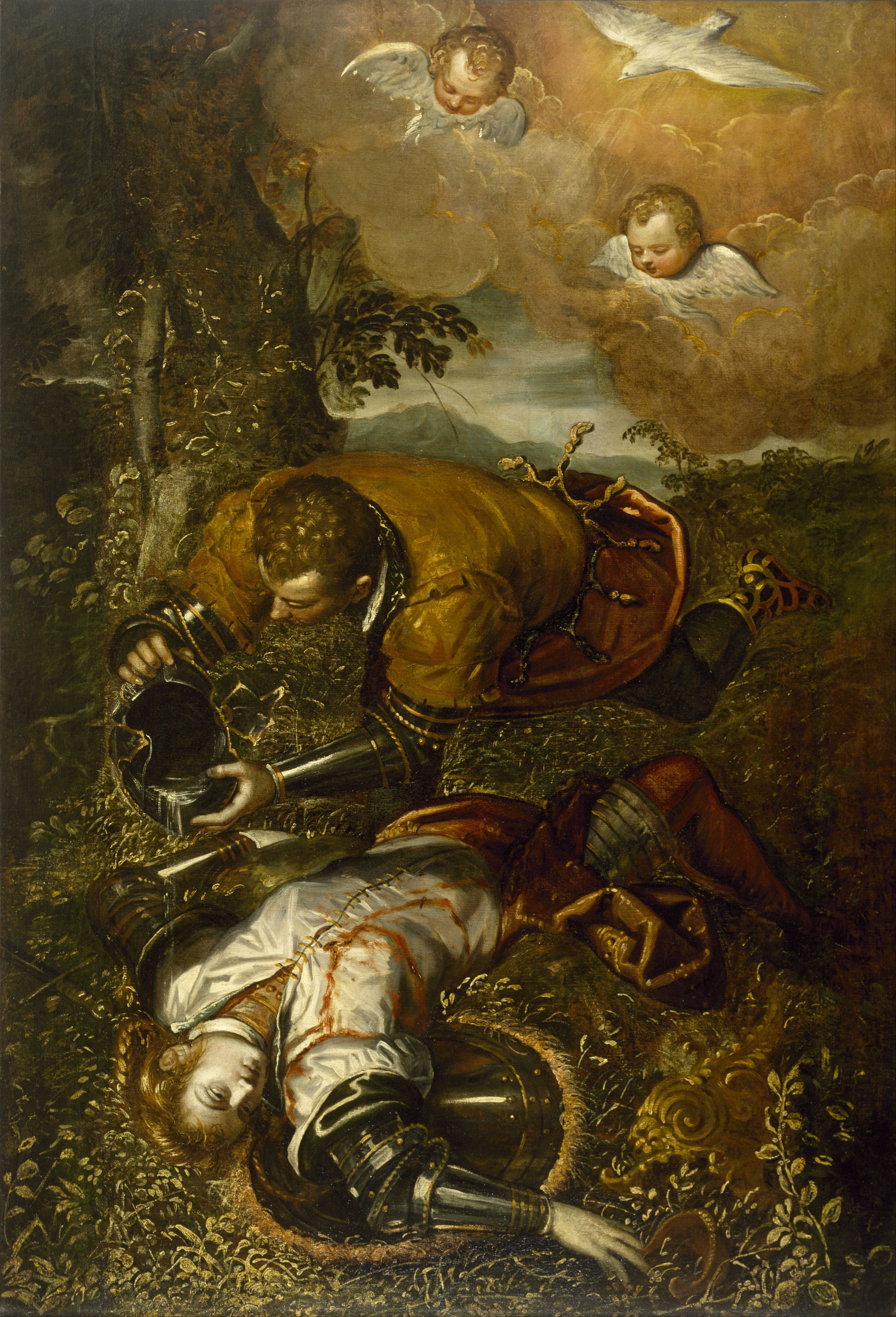
Tancred baptizing Clorinda according to Tintoretto (Houston Museum of Fine Arts)

== In fiction ==
Tancred appears as a character in Torquato Tasso's 16th-century poem Jerusalem Delivered, in which he is portrayed as an epic hero and given a fictional love interest, the pagan warrior-maiden Clorinda. This poem was the inspiration for the 1957 film The Mighty Crusaders, about the Siege of Jerusalem in June–July 1099. He is also loved by the Princess Erminia of Antioch. Portions of Tasso's verses were set by Claudio Monteverdi in his 1624 dramatic work Il combattimento di Tancredi e Clorinda. He also appears in one of the scenes in Imre Madách's The Tragedy of Man. In Tom Harper's Siege of Heaven he is depicted as a violent psychopath. His portrayal is similar although slightly more humorous in Alfred Duggan's novel Count Bohemond.

Tancred also appears in Sir Walter Scott's 1832 novel Count Robert of Paris, as one of the Crusade leaders who returned to Constantinople from Scutari to ensure a fair contest between Count Robert and his challenger. The novel Tancred, or the New Crusade by Benjamin Disraeli centres around the adventures of an imagined modern descendant and namesake of the Prince of Galilee. Rossini's opera Tancredi is based on Tasso, via Voltaire's play Tancrède of 1759.

Tancred and his actions during the First Crusade was depicted in the 4th episode of the documentary Mankind: The Story of All of Us.

== Sources ==
- Edwards, Robert W., The Fortifications of Armenian Cilicia: Dumbarton Oaks Studies XXIII, Washington, D.C.: Dumbarton Oaks, Trustees for Harvard University (1987). ISBN 0-88402-163-7
- Asbridge, Thomas (2000). The Creation of the Principality of Antioch, 1098–1130. Boydell & Brewer. ISBN 978-0-85115-661-3.
- Lock, Peter (2006). The Routledge Companion to the Crusades. Routledge. ISBN 9-78-0-415-39312-6.
- Robert Lawrence Nicholson, Tancred: A Study of His Career and Work. AMS Press, 1978.
- Peters, Edward, ed., The First Crusade: The Chronicle of Fulcher of Chartres and Other Source Materials, (Philadelphia: University of Pennsylvania Press, 1998)
- Barber, Malcolm (2 August 2012). The Crusader States. Yale University Press. ISBN 978-0-300-18931-5.
- Runciman, Steven (3 December 1987). A History of the Crusades. CUP Archive. pp. 125–126. ISBN 978-0-521-34771-6.
- Smail, R. C. Crusading Warfare 1097–1193. New York: Barnes & Noble Books, (1956) 1995. ISBN 1-56619-769-4
- Ferdinandi, Sergio (2017). La Contea Franca di Edessa. Fondazione e Profilo Storico del Primo Principato Crociato nel Levante (1098-1150). Pontificia Università Antonianum - Rome. ISBN 978-88-7257-103-3.
- Nicholson, Robert L. (1969) [1955]. "The Foundation of the Latin States, 1099–1118". In Setton, Kenneth M.; Baldwin, Marshall W. (eds.). A History of the Crusades, Volume I: The First Hundred Years. Vol. 1 (Second ed.). Madison, Milwaukee, and London: University of Wisconsin Press. ISBN 0-299-04834-9.

New title	Prince of Galilee; 1099–1101	Succeeded by Hugh of Fauquembergues
Preceded by Geldemar Carpenel	Lord of Haifa; 1104–1112	Succeeded by Rorgius
Preceded by Bohemond I of Taranto	Prince of Antioch; 1104–1112	Succeeded by Roger of Salerno
Preceded by Gervase of Bazoches	Prince of Galilee; 1109–1112	Succeeded by Joscelin of Courtenay
