= Ludolf of Tournai =

Lethold of Doornik or Letholdus was the first Flemish Christian knight over the walls of Jerusalem during the siege of Jerusalem of 1099, essentially ending the First Crusade, according to a contemporary account by an unknown eyewitness. It is said that when the Muslims saw Lethold emerge over the walls, many of them began to retreat further into Jerusalem.

== See also ==
- Tancred, Prince of Galilee - alternative claimant of "the first Christian knight over the walls of Jerusalem "
