= Emma of Hauteville =

Italo-Norman noblewoman (1080–1120)

Emma of Hauteville (fl. c. 1080–c. 1120) was a daughter of Robert Guiscard and Alberada of Buonalbergo. According to Ralph of Caen, she married Odo the Good Marquis and had two sons: Tancred and William, both of whom participated in the First Crusade. Tancred became Prince of Galilee and William died in the Holy Land. Her daughter Altrude married Richard of the Principate and was the mother of Roger of Salerno.

Emma was dead by 1126, when Robert Guiscard’s second wife and widow, Sichelgaita, made a donation in her family's memory.

== Sources ==
- Caravale, Mario (ed). Dizionario Biografico degli Italiani, vol. LXIII. Rome.
