= Battle of Melitene =

Military engagement between Bohemond I of Antioch and the Danishmend Turks

- Part of the Crusades
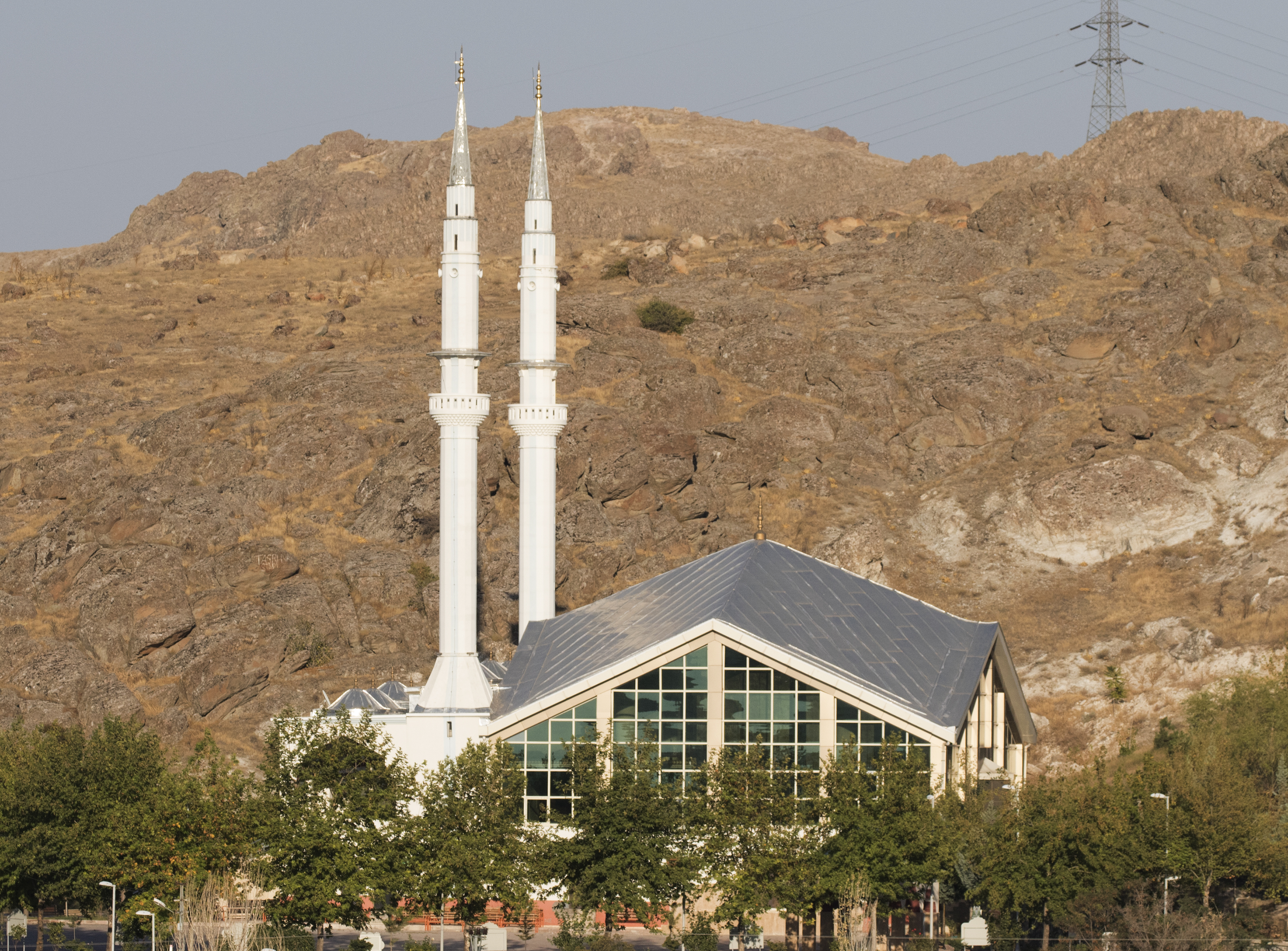
- Malatya
Date	1100
Location	Malatya, Medieval Anatolia (modern-day Turkey)
Result	Danishmendid victory

Belligerents
Principality of Antioch	Danishmendids

Commanders and leaders
Bohemond I of Antioch (POW)	Gazi Gümüshtigin

Strength
300 knights (Albert of Aix); 5000 men (Ibn al-Athir)	Unknown

Casualties and losses
Most killed, a few captured	Unknown

In the Battle of Melitene in 1100, a Crusader force led by Bohemond I of Antioch was defeated in Melitene in eastern Anatolia by Danishmend Turks commanded by Gazi Gümüshtigin.

After acquiring the Principality of Antioch in 1098, Bohemond allied himself with the Armenians of Cilicia. When Gabriel of Melitene and his Armenian garrison came under attack from the Danishmend state to their north, Bohemond marched to their relief with a Frankish force.

Malik Ghazi's Danishmends ambushed the expedition and "most of the Crusaders were killed." Bohemond was captured along with Richard of Salerno. Among the dead were the Armenian bishops of Marash and Antioch. Bohemond was held for ransom until 1103, and his rescue became the object of one column of the ill-fated Crusade of 1101.

This battle ended the string of victories enjoyed by the participants of the First Crusade. Baldwin, Count of Edessa and later king of Jerusalem, successfully relieved Melitene afterward. However, while the Crusaders were negotiating the ransom of Bohemond, the Danishmends seized the town in 1103 and executed Gabriel of Melitene.
