= Girard of Buonalbergo =

Girard, lord of Buonalbergo, was a Norman nobleman in the middle of the eleventh century in the Mezzogiorno. He was in the service of the prince of Benevento.

Despite being chiefly known for giving his paternal aunt Alberada in marriage to the upstart Robert Guiscard, to assure the latter's alliance, he was an important enough baron to send 200 knights in fee as Alberada's dowry and still commit many to Humphrey, Count of Apulia and brother of the Guiscard, in the Battle of Civitate of 1053. He himself took part in the battle, and remained a steadfast ally of Guiscard throughout numerous rebellions in Apulia. He was also father to Robert of Bounalbergo, a knight of the First Crusade.

When Guiscard left to campaign against the Byzantine Empire in 1081, Girard served as regent and counselor for Guiscard's son Roger Borsa.
