= David Donachie =

British writer (1944–2023)

David Donachie (1944 – 21 December 2023) was a British nautical historical novel novelist. He also wrote under the pen-names Tom Connery and Jack Ludlow as well as, from 2019, Jack Cole.

== Biography ==
Donachie was elected to the Management Committee of the Society of Authors in 2014 and became chair in March 2016.

Born in Edinburgh, Donachie lived in Deal, Kent, with his novelist wife Sarah Grazebrook. He died from cancer in 2023, at the age of 79.

== Series ==
As of 2016, there were 27 books published under his own name and 20 under his pen-names. He is best known for his seafaring novels.

=== The Privateersman Mysteries ===
1. The Devil's Own Luck (1991)
2. The Dying Trade (1993)
3. A Hanging Matter (1994)
4. An Element of Chance (1995)
5. The Scent of Betrayal (1996)
6. A Game of Bones (1997)

=== The Markham of the Marines Series (writing as Tom Connery) ===
1. A Shred of Honour (1996)
2. Honour Redeemed (1997)
3. Honour Be Damned (1999)

=== Nelson and Emma ===
1. On a Making Tide (2000)
2. Tested by Fate (2001)
3. Nelson: Breaking the Line (2001)

=== The John Pearce Series ===
1. By the Mast Divided (2004)
2. A Shot Rolling Ship (2005)
3. An Awkward Commission (2006)
4. Flag of Truce (2008), his most widely held book; according to WorldCat, the book is held in 402 libraries
5. The Admirals' Game (2008)
6. An Ill Wind (2009)
7. Blown off Course (2011)
8. Enemies at Every Turn (2011)
9. A Sea of Troubles (2012)
10. A Divided Command (2013)
11. The Devil to Pay (2014)
12. The Perils of Command (2015)
13. A Treacherous Coast (2016)
14. On a Particular Service (2017)
15. A Close Run Thing (2018)
16. HMS Hazard (2021)
17. A Troubled Course (2022)
18. Droits of the Crown (2023)

=== The Contraband Shore Series ===
1. The Contraband Shore (2018)
2. A Lawless Place (2019)
3. Blood Will Out (2019)

=== As Jack Cole ===
1. Every Second Counts
2. Tight Lies

=== The Republic Series (writing as Jack Ludlow) ===
1. The Pillars of Rome (2007)
2. The Sword of Revenge (2008)
3. The Gods of War (2008)

=== The Crusades Trilogy (writing as Jack Ludlow) ===
1. Son of Blood (2012)
2. Soldier of Crusade (2012)
3. Prince of Legend (2013)

=== The Conquest Series (writing as Jack Ludlow) ===
1. Mercenaries
2. Warriors
3. Conquest
4. Hawkwood

=== The Last Roman Trilogy (writing as Jack Ludlow) ===
1. Vengeance (2014)
2. Honour (2014)
3. Triumph (2015)

== Sources ==
- "David Donachie". FantasticFiction.
