= Victims of the White Ship disaster =

List of those who drowned in the 1120 White Ship disaster

The White Ship disaster on 25 November 1120 (called 7 kalends of December by Farrer) claimed the lives of numerous high-ranking people of Norman England.

== Captain and crew ==
- Thomas FitzStephen, Captain
- Helmsman (unnamed), apparently drunk
- Approximately 50 oarsmen and sailors (named)

== Passengers who died ==
Approximately 250, including servants and marines. Of these, 140 were knights or noblemen and 18 were noblewomen.

=== Family of Henry I of England ===
- William Adelin, duke of Normandy, sole legitimate son of King Henry I of England. William, rescued in the only skiff available on the ship, had the crew return to get his sister Matilda. The small craft was overwhelmed by drowning passengers and crew and quickly sank. Upon hearing of his son's death, it was said that Henry never smiled again.
- Matilda FitzRoy, countess of Perche, illegitimate daughter of King Henry. The Anglo-Saxon Chronicles do not list Matilda as being aboard the ship.
- Richard of Lincoln, Henry's illegitimate son. Richard's betrothed, Amice, did not travel with him.

=== D'Avranches family ===
- Richard d'Avranches, 2nd Earl of Chester
- Lucia-Mahaut (Matilda), Countess of Chester, the king's niece, wife of Richard d'Avranches, and sister of Stephen of Blois, who chose not to board the vessel
- Ottuel d'Avranches, the illegitimate half-brother of Richard d'Avranches, governor of the king's sons
- Geoffrey Ridel, royal justice and brother-in-law to Richard d'Avranches

==== Seigneurs de l'Aigle ====
- Gilbert d'Aigle, viscount of Exmes, first cousin of Richard d'Avranches
- Geoffroy de l'Aigle, son of Gilbert, survived clinging to a rock, but then succumbed to exhaustion
- Engenulf d'Aigle, son of Gilbert

=== Royal household ===
- William Bigod, steward of the household of King Henry.
- Gisulf, the king's "iniquitous secretary".
- Robert I of Mauduit, chamberlain to the king, son of William I of Mauduit. Robert's brother William II was the great-great-grandfather of William Mauduit, 8th Earl of Warwick.
- Stewards, chamberlains, cupbearers and various officers.
- An armed marine force, who were apparently very disorderly, drunk and scarcely paid attention to anyone on board.

=== Nobles of England ===
A number of other nobility of England were on board, although very little is known about them.

- Walter of Everci
- Robert Mauduit
- Hugh of Molines

=== Nobles of Normandy ===
- Ralph the Red of Pont-Echanfray, who saved Richard from capture at Les Andelys. Ralph's second wife may have also been on the ship.
- Ivo II and William de Grandmesnil, described as the "two beautiful sons" of Ivo de Grandmesnil
- William of Rhuddlan, son of Robert of Rhuddlan and cousin of Ivo II and William de Grandmesnil

=== Clergy ===
- Geoffrey, archdeacon of Hereford
- William, son of Roger, bishop of Coutances, with his brother and three nephews

=== Family of the Emperor ===
- Theodoric, son of Henry (d. 1105), a relative of Emperor Henry V. Henry was likely the son of Agnes, sister of the emperor. Orderic Vitalis identified him as Teodericus puer Henrici nepos imperatoris Alemannorum, which would imply that he was the grandson of Agnes. Farrer identifies him as a nephew of Emperor Henry by his sister Agnes and Frederic, Duke of Swabia.

== The sole survivor ==
- Berold, a butcher from Rouen, who was likely on board to collect the debts owed to him by the travellers.

== Those who chose to travel on a different ship ==
- Henry I, King of England.
- Matilda, wife of William Adelin and daughter-in-law of Henry I
- Two monks of Tiron (names unknown)
- Stephen of Blois, later king of England, with two men-at-arms
- William de Roumare, Earl of Lincoln
- Edward of Salisbury, high sheriff of Wiltshire and chamberlain to the king
- Rabel, son of the chamberlain Robert I of Mauduit (see above)
- Ranulf le Meschin, 3rd Earl of Chester, a nephew of Richard, 2nd Earl of Chester
- William de Pirou, steward to the king (Orderic Vitalis claims he died aboard the ship, which seems unlikely since he was apparently still alive in 1123)
