= Alberada of Buonalbergo =

Duchess of Apulia, Italy (died around 1122)

Alberada of Buonalbergo (also Aubrey of Buonalbergo; c. 1035 – c. 1120), was a duchess of Apulia as the first wife of Robert Guiscard, duke of Apulia (1059–1085).

She married Guiscard in 1051 or 1052, when he was still just a robber baron in Calabria. As her dowry, she brought Robert Guiscard 200 knights under command of her nephew Girard of Buonalbergo. She had two children with Guiscard: a daughter, Emma, mother of Tancred, Prince of Galilee, and a son, Prince Bohemond I of Antioch.In 1058, after Pope Nicholas II strengthened existing canon law against consanguinity, Guiscard repudiated Alberada on that basis, in order to make a then-more advantageous marriage to Sichelgaita, the sister of Prince Gisulf II of Salerno. This new marriage would hopefully serve to ally the Lombard and Normans; with Alberada and Guiscard's children simply too young to feasibly be married off, Guiscard may have determined to use himself. Nevertheless, the split was amicable and Alberada showed no later ill will.

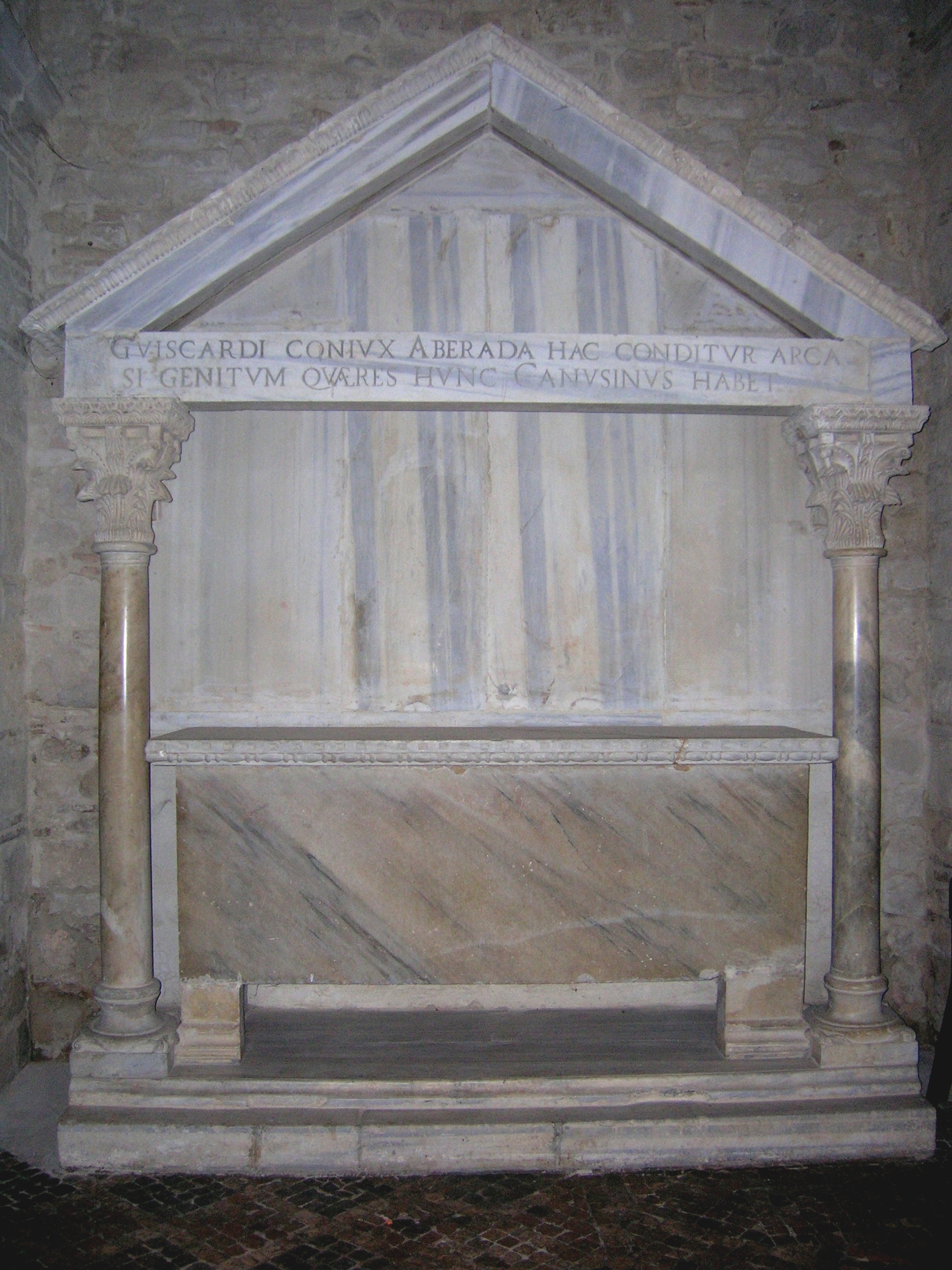
Grave of Aberada/Alberada, Abbey of Holy Trinity, Venosa.

She was alive at the death of Bohemond in March 1111 and died very old, probably in July 1122 or thereabouts. She was buried near the Hauteville family mausoleum in the Abbey of Holy Trinity at Venosa. Her tomb is the only one remaining intact today.

== Sources ==
- Norwich, John Julius. The Normans in the South 1016-1130. Longmans: London, 1967.
