= Ralph of Caen =

French historian and writer

Ralph of Caen (also known as Radulphus Cadomensis) (c. 1080 – c. 1120) was a Norman chaplain and author of the Gesta Tancredi in expeditione Hierosolymitana (The Deeds of Tancred in the Crusade).

== Biography ==
Ralph was born before 1080 to an unknown family who likely traced their roots to Caen in Normandy. As Ralph's early education was conducted at the cathedral school in Caen under his teacher and life-long friend Arnulf of Chocques, later Latin Patriarch of Jerusalem, this suggests that his family were of significant status. Ralph was ordained as a priest by 1106 and recruited by Bohemond I of Antioch in that year as his chaplain. In 1107, Ralph traveled with Bohemond on his ultimately unsuccessful campaign in the Balkans.

Ralph of Caen was well educated in the Latin classics. Besides Virgil, whose work he knew well, he was acquainted with Ovid, who did not become popular until the twelfth-century Renaissance, and even Horace, who never developed much medieval reputation. More directly, in view of his project, he had read Roman historians: Livy and Caesar (in his Gallic War), whom he took as his models, and also Lucan's Pharsalia and Sallust's history. His narrative (in 157 sections) is in prose when recounting events, rising to poetry to describe Tancred's capture and despoliation of the Dome of the Rock in Jerusalem in heroic, less literal terms.
