= Bohemond I of Antioch =

11/12th-century prince of Taranto and Antioch; military leader in the First Crusade

Bohemond I
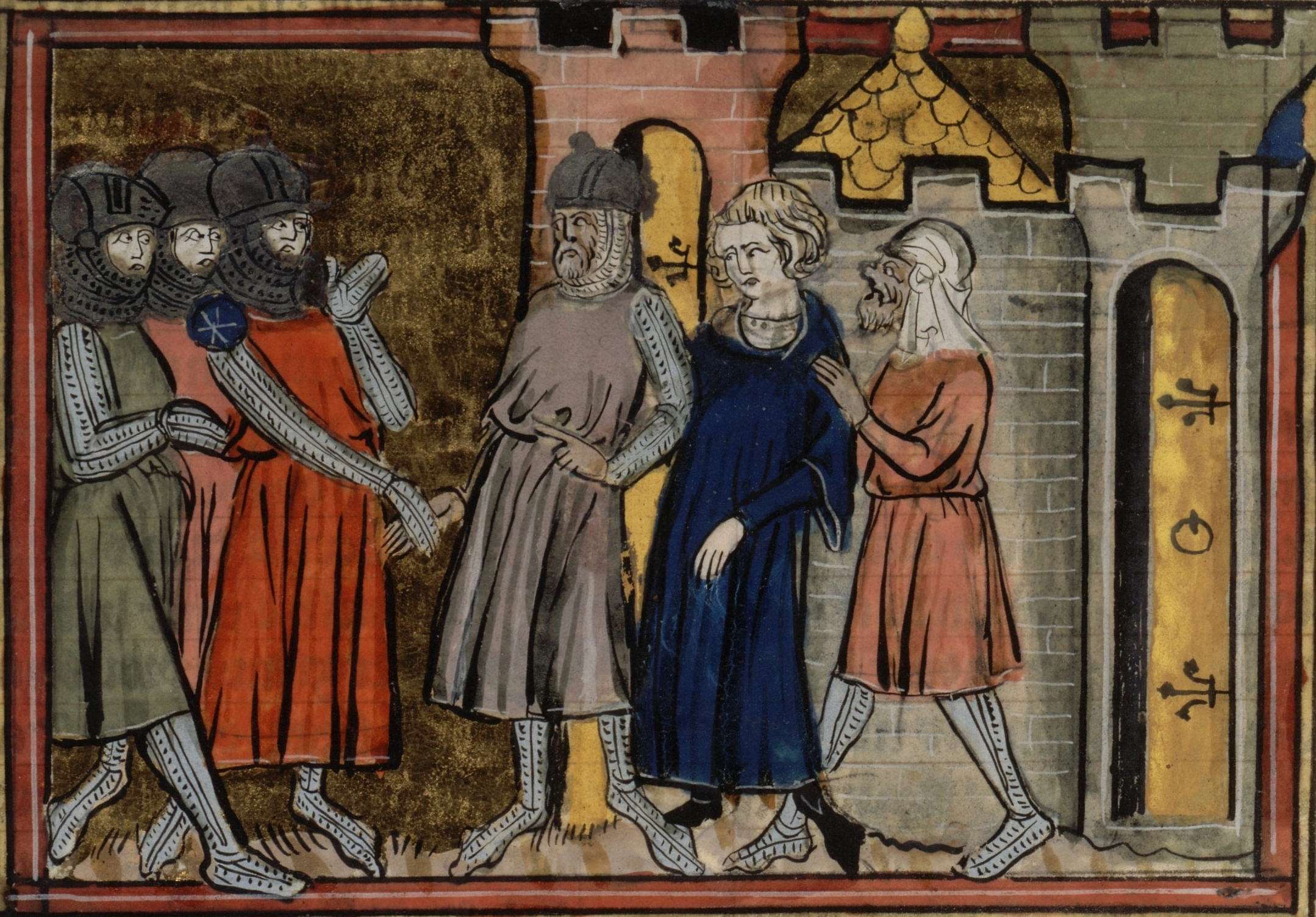
- Bohemond pictured on the left clean shaven and in a red surcoat negotiating the release of Hugh of Vermandois

Prince of Antioch
- Reign: 1098–1111
- Successor: Bohemond II
- Regent: Tancred of Hauteville

Prince of Taranto
- Reign: 1088–1111
- Predecessor: Robert Guiscard
- Successor: Bohemond II
- Born: c. 1054; San Marco Argentano, Calabria, County of Apulia and Calabria
- Died: 5 or 7 March 1111 (aged 56–57); Canosa di Puglia, County of Apulia and Calabria
- Burial: Canosa di Puglia Mausoleum
- Spouse: Constance of France
- Issue: Bohemond II of Antioch
- House: Hauteville
- Father: Robert Guiscard
- Mother: Alberada of Buonalbergo
- Religion: Roman Catholic

Bohemond I of Antioch (c. 1054 – 5 or 7 March 1111), also known as Bohemond of Taranto or Bohemond of Hauteville, was the prince of Taranto from 1089 to 1111 and the prince of Antioch from 1098 to 1111. He was a leader of the First Crusade, leading a contingent of Normans on the quest eastward. Knowledgeable about the Byzantine Empire through earlier campaigns with his father, he was the most experienced military leader of the crusade.

== Early life ==
=== Childhood and youth ===
Bohemond, christened as Marc, but nicknamed after a legendary giant, was the son of Robert Guiscard, Count of Apulia and Calabria, and his first wife, Alberada of Buonalbergo. He was born between 1050 and 1058—in 1054 according to historian John Julius Norwich. He was baptised Mark, possibly because he was born at his father's castle at San Marco Argentano in Calabria.

His parents were related within the degree of kinship that made their marriage invalid under canon law. In 1058, Pope Nicholas II strengthened existing canon law against consanguinity and, on that basis, Guiscard repudiated Alberada in favour of a then more advantageous marriage to Sikelgaita, the sister of Gisulf, the Lombard Prince of Salerno. With the annulment of his parents' marriage, Bohemond became a bastard. Before long, Alberada married Robert Guiscard's nephew, Richard of Hauteville. She arranged for a knightly education for Bohemond. Bohemond was multilingual. Apart from his native Norman, he most likely understood or even spoke Romance "Lombard Italian" and spoke and possibly even read Greek.

Robert Guiscard was taken seriously ill in early 1073. Fearing that he was dying, Sikelgaita held an assembly in Bari. She persuaded Robert's vassals who were present to proclaim her eldest son, the thirteen-year-old Roger Borsa, Robert's heir, claiming that the half-Lombard Roger would be the ruler most acceptable to the Lombard nobles in Southern Italy. Robert's nephew, Abelard of Hauteville, was the only baron to protest, because he regarded himself Robert's lawful heir.

=== Byzantine wars ===
Bohemond fought in his father's army during the rebellion of Jordan I of Capua, Geoffrey of Conversano and other Norman barons in 1079. His father dispatched him at the head of an advance guard against the Byzantine Empire in early 1081 and he captured Valona (now Vlorë in Albania). He sailed to Corfu, but did not invade the island since the local garrison outnumbered his army. He withdrew to Butrinto to await the arrival of his father's forces. After Robert Guiscard arrived in the latter half of May, they laid siege to Dyrrhachium (present-day Durrës). The Byzantine Emperor Alexios I Komnenos came to the rescue of the town but, on 18 October, his army suffered a crushing defeat. Bohemond commanded the left flank, which defeated the Emperor's largely Anglo-Saxon Varangian Guard.

The Normans captured Dyrrhachium on 21 February 1082. They marched along the Via Egnatia as far as Kastoria, but Alexios's agents stirred up a rebellion in Southern Italy, forcing Robert Guiscard to return to his realm in April. He charged Bohemond with the command of his army in the Balkans. Bohemond defeated the Byzantines at Ioannina and at Arta, taking control of most of Macedonia and Thessaly; however, the six-month siege of Larissa was unsuccessful. Supply and pay problems (and the gifts promised to deserters by the Byzantines) undermined the morale of the Norman army, so Bohemond returned to Italy for financial support. During his absence, most of the Norman commanders deserted to the Byzantines and a Venetian fleet recaptured Dyrrhachium and Corfu.

Bohemond accompanied his father to the Byzantine Empire again in 1084, when they defeated the Venetian fleet and captured Corfu. An epidemic decimated the Normans and Bohemond, who was taken seriously ill, was forced to return to Italy in December 1084.

=== Succession crisis ===
Robert Guiscard died at Cephalonia on 17 July 1085. Orderic Vitalis, William of Malmesbury and other contemporaneous writers accused his widow, Sikelgaita, of having poisoned Robert to secure Apulia for her son, Roger Borsa, but failed to establish her guilt. She persuaded the army to acclaim Roger Borsa his father's successor and they hurried back to Southern Italy. Two months later, the assembly of the Norman barons confirmed the succession, but Bohemond regarded himself his father's lawful heir. He made an alliance with Jordan of Capua, and captured Oria and Otranto. Bohemond and Roger Borsa met at their father's tomb at Venosa to reach a compromise. Under the terms of their agreement, Bohemond received Taranto, Oria, Otranto, Brindisi (through the transfer of Geoffrey of Conversano's vassalage from Roger to Bohemond) and Gallipoli, but acknowledged Roger Borsa's succession.

Bohemond renewed the war against his brother in the autumn of 1087. The ensuing civil war prevented the Normans from supporting Pope Urban II, and enabled the brothers' uncle, Roger I of Sicily, to increase his power. Bohemond captured Bari in 1090 and before long, took control of most lands to the south of Melfi.

== First Crusade ==
In 1097, Bohemond and his uncle Roger I of Sicily were attacking Amalfi, which had revolted against Duke Roger, when bands of crusaders began to pass on their way through Italy to Constantinople. It is possible that Bohemond had religious reasons for joining the First Crusade. It is equally likely that he saw in the First Crusade the chance to gain a lordship in the Middle East. Lilie details that Bohemond's "father's second marriage deprived him of future prospects," in Norman Italy. While he was well known as a warrior, Bohemond's lordship in Italy was small. Geoffrey Malaterra bluntly states that Bohemond took the Cross with the intention of plundering and conquering Byzantine lands. Another reason to suspect Bohemond's religious zeal is the supposed embassy Bohemond sent to Godfrey of Bouillon, a powerful Crusade leader, asking him to join forces to sack Constantinople. While Godfrey declined his offer, taking Constantinople was never far from Bohemond's mind, as seen in his later attempt to take over the Byzantine Empire.

He gathered a Norman army, which would have been one of the smaller crusade forces with 500 knights and about 2,500–3,500 infantry soldiers, alongside his nephew Tancred's force of 2,000 men. What contributed to the Norman army's reputation as a great fighting force was their experience fighting in the East. Many Normans had been employed as mercenaries by the Byzantine Empire. Others like Bohemond had experience fighting the Byzantines and Muslim groups in the East fifteen years prior with Robert Guiscard. Bohemond crossed the Adriatic Sea to Constantinople along the route he had tried to follow in 1082–1084 when attacking the Byzantine Empire. He was careful to observe the correct attitude towards Alexios along this route, which was mainly keeping his soldiers from plundering Byzantine villages en route to Constantinople.

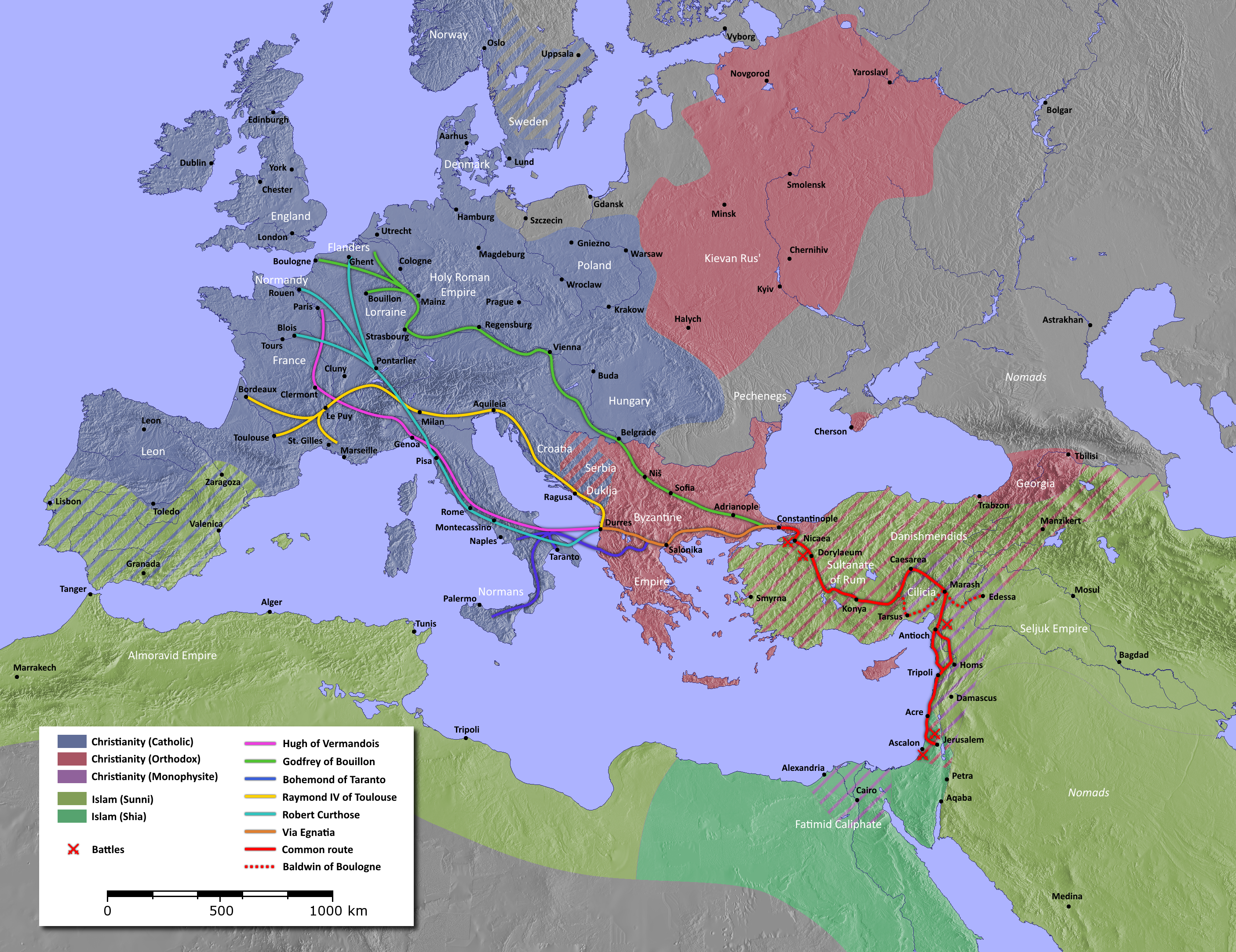
A map of the routes of the major leaders of the First Crusade

When he arrived at Constantinople in April 1097, he took an oath of homage to Emperor Alexios, which he demanded from all crusade leaders. It's not clear what exact negotiations Bohemond and Alexios made concerning Bohemond governing the part of the eastern lands of the Byzantine Empire Alexios hoped the crusaders would reclaim. Alexios had no reason to trust Bohemond enough to give him a position at the time, but hinted that he could get a position by proving his loyalty, similarly to Bohemond's half-brother Guy. Bohemond's best chance at gaining a favorable position was to be loyal to Alexios, which he attempted to prove while the crusaders were camped around Constantinople. Bohemond, proficient in Greek, was a conduit between Alexios and the crusade leaders. Bohemond also attempted to prove his loyalty by convincing other crusade leaders to take the oath of homage to Alexios.

From Constantinople to Antioch, Bohemond was a standout among the leaders of the First Crusade. Bohemond's reputation as an effective strategist and leader came from his fighting experience in the Balkans when he took charge of his father's army against Emperor Alexios (1082–1085). There Bohemond became familiar with various Byzantine and Muslim strategies, including an encircling strategy used by Turkish forces at the siege of Nicaea. Mounted archers would encircle the crusader force, who would be unable to retaliate using close combat weaponry. Bohemond's familiarity with this Eastern strategy allowed him to adapt quickly, leading to crusader victories through Antioch.

Bohemond saw the opportunity to use the crusade for his own ends at the siege of Antioch. When his nephew Tancred left the main army at Heraclea Cybistra and attempted to establish a footing in Cilicia, the movement may have been already intended as a preparation for Bohemond's eastern principality. Bohemond was the first to take up a position before Antioch (October 1097). In the subsequent siege of Antioch, he played a key role in gathering supplies, stopping the attempt of Ridwan of Aleppo to relieve the city from the east, and connecting the besiegers on the west with the Genoese fleet which lay in the port of St. Simeon. Due to his successful efforts Bohemond was seen as the actual leader of the siege of Antioch, rather than the elected leader Stephen of Blois, who would soon leave the siege, claiming illness.

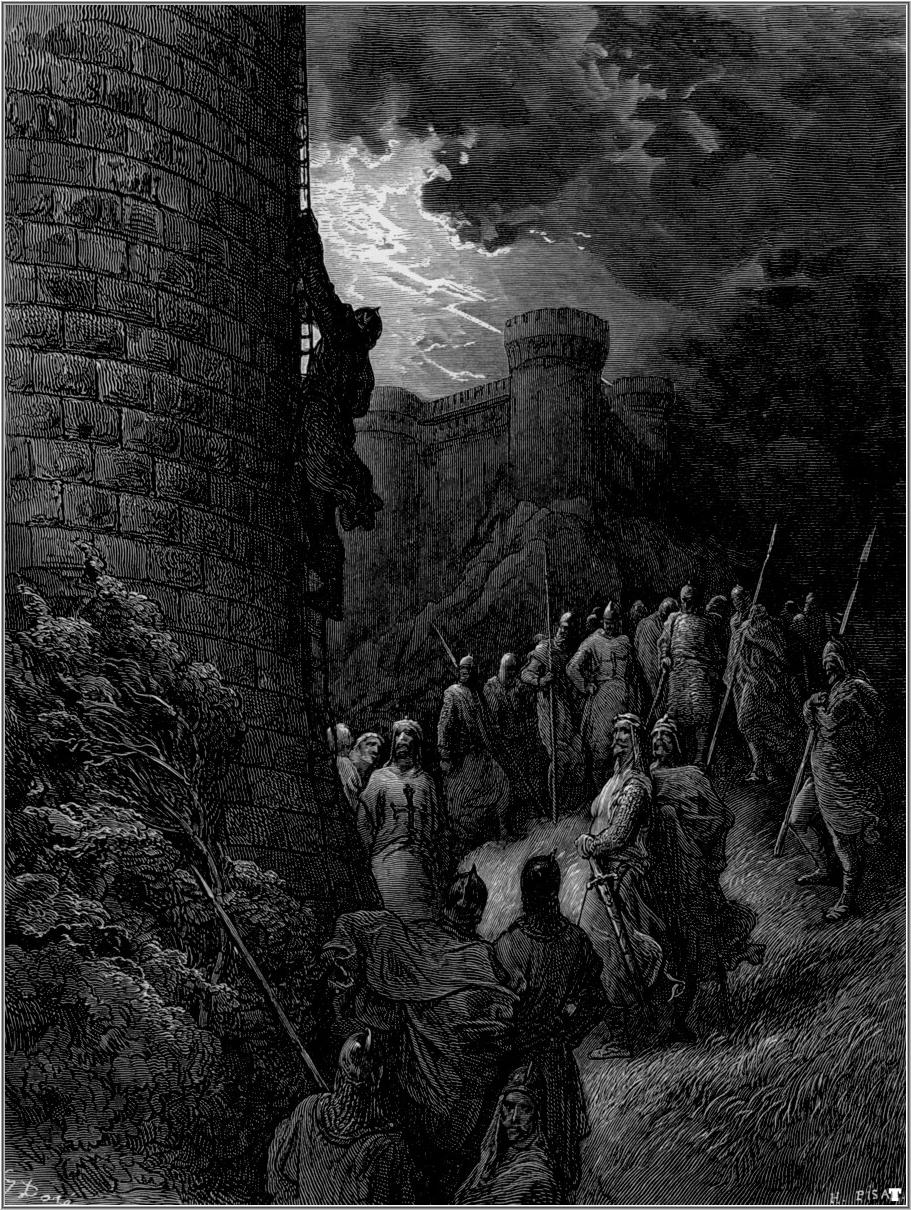
Bohemond and his Norman troops scale the walls of Antioch, in an engraving by Gustave Doré

Bohemond was able to make a deal with Firouz, one of the commanders of the city wall to end the siege of Antioch. However, he did not press to end the siege until May 1098 when learning of the approach of Kerbogha with a relief army. He then proposed to the other crusade leaders that the one to take Antioch should be put in charge of the city, as Alexios' representative Tetigus had left in February 1098. Firouz led Bohemond's force up the walls of Antioch, allowing the Norman troops to infiltrate and ultimately capture the city.

The Crusaders' troubles were not over, however, as Kerbogha started his own siege on Antioch. Bohemond was credited as the general and creator of the battle plan used to defeat Kerbogha by Raymond of Aguilers. Running very low on food and supplies Bohemond took the initiative by leaving the city and attacking Kerbogha's forces, leading to a victory for the crusaders.

Bohemond then wanted to take control of Antioch for himself, but there were some problems he had to face first. Raymond of Toulouse, a prominent crusade leader, did not want to hand Antioch over to Bohemond. Raymond claimed that Bohemond and other leaders would be breaking their oath to Alexios, which was to give any conquered lands to the Byzantine Empire. Bohemond argued that because Alexios had failed to come to the crusaders' aid at Antioch that the oath was no longer valid. Bohemond set himself up as the Prince of Antioch, and no Latin crusader or Byzantine force came to take it from him. Raymond of Toulouse decided to give up Antioch to Bohemond in January 1099, as the other crusaders moved south to the capture of Jerusalem.

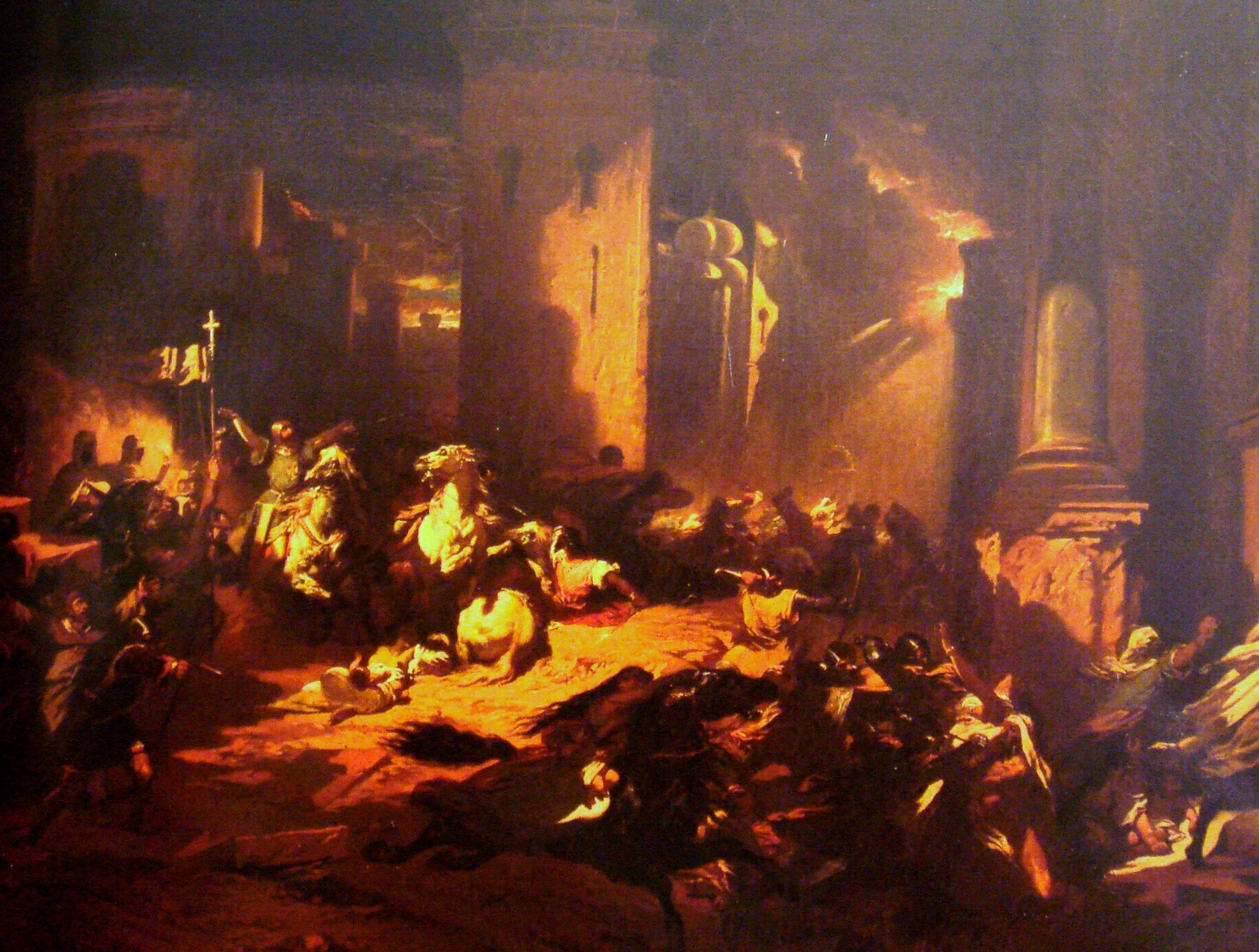
Capture of Antioch by Bohemond in June 1098, in a painting by Louis Gallait, 1840

After the fall of Jerusalem, Bohemond was besieging the Byzantine garrison in Latakia but he was forced by returning crusading leaders, including Raymond, to abandon the siege. Bohemond went together with Baldwin of Edessa to Jerusalem at Christmas 1099 to fulfill his crusade vows. While there he took part in the installation of Dagobert of Pisa as Patriarch of Jerusalem, perhaps in order to check the growth of Godfrey and his knights of Lorraine's power in the city. By submitting to the patriarch, Bohemond made connections to Jerusalem, a potential ally against future attacks on Antioch, and to remain in the Pope's good graces. While Bohemond had the fine territory, strategic position, and army necessary to found a principality in Antioch, he had to face two great forces—the Byzantine Empire, which claimed the whole of his territories, and the strong Muslim principalities in the north-east of Syria. Against these two forces he would ultimately fail.

== Wars between Antioch and the Byzantine Empire ==
In 1100, Bohemond received a petition for help from Armenian chieftain Gabriel of Melitene. Gabriel was in possession of one of the major cities controlling the access to Anatolia and had received reports that Gazi Gümüshtigin of Sebastea was preparing an expedition to capture Melitene. The Armenians sought help from Bohemond and even offered Gabriel's daughter Morphia in marriage.

Afraid to weaken his forces at Antioch, but not wishing to avoid the chance to extend his domain northwards, in August 1100 Bohemond marched north with only 300 knights and a small force of foot soldiers. Failing to send scouting parties, they were ambushed by the Turks and completely encircled at the Battle of Melitene. Bohemond managed to send one soldier to seek help from Baldwin I of Edessa but was captured. He was laden with chains and imprisoned in Neo-Caesarea (modern Niksar) until 1103.

Emperor Alexios was incensed that Bohemond had broken his oath made in Constantinople and kept Antioch for himself. When he heard of Bohemond's capture, he offered to redeem the Norman commander for 260,000 dinars, if Gümüshtigin would hand the prisoner over to Byzantium. When Kilij Arslan I, the Seljuk overlord of Gümüshtigin, heard of the proposed payment, he threatened to attack unless given half the ransom. Bohemond proposed instead a ransom of 130,000 dinars paid just to Gümüshtigin. The bargain was concluded, and Gümüshtigin and Bohemond exchanged oaths of friendship. Ransomed by Baldwin of Edessa, he returned in triumph to Antioch in August 1103. Instrumental in the release of Bohemond was according to Matthew of Edessa the Armenian Kogh Vasil, who organised the collection of ransom, contributing substantially himself and apparently even adopting Bohemond as son afterwards.

His nephew Tancred had taken his uncle's place for three years. During that time, he had attacked the Byzantines, and had added Tarsus, Adana and Massissa in Cilicia to his uncle's territory; he was now deprived of his lordship by Bohemond's return. During the summer of 1103, the northern Franks attacked Ridwan of Aleppo to gain supplies and compelled him to pay tribute. Meanwhile, Raymond of Toulouse had established himself in Tripoli with the aid of Alexios, and was able to check the expansion of Antioch to the south. Early in 1104, Baldwin and Bohemond passed Aleppo to move eastward and attack Harran.

Whilst leading the campaign against Harran, Bohemond was defeated at Balak, near Raqqa on the Euphrates (see Battle of Harran). The defeat was decisive, making the great eastern principality which Bohemond had contemplated impossible. It was followed by a Greek attack on Cilicia and, despairing of his own resources, Bohemond returned to Europe for reinforcements in late 1104. It is a matter of historical debate whether his "crusade" against the Byzantine empire was to gain the backing and indulgences of Pope Paschal II. Either way, he enthralled audiences across France with gifts of relics from the Holy Land and tales of heroism while fighting the infidel, gathering a large army in the process. Henry I of England famously prevented him from landing on English shores, since the king anticipated Bohemond's great attraction to the English nobility. His newfound status won him the hand of Constance, daughter of the French king, Philip I. Of this marriage wrote Abbot Suger:

Bohemond came to France to seek by any means he could gain the hand of the Lord Louis' sister Constance, a young lady of excellent breeding, elegant appearance and beautiful face. So great was the reputation for valour of the French kingdom and of the Lord Louis that even the Saracens were terrified by the prospect of that marriage. She was not engaged since she had broken off her agreement to wed Hugh, count of Troyes, and wished to avoid another unsuitable match. The prince of Antioch was experienced and rich both in gifts and promises; he fully deserved the marriage, which was celebrated with great pomp by the bishop of Chartres in the presence of the king, the Lord Louis, and many archbishops, bishops and noblemen of the realm.

Bohemond and Constance produced a son, Bohemond II of Antioch.

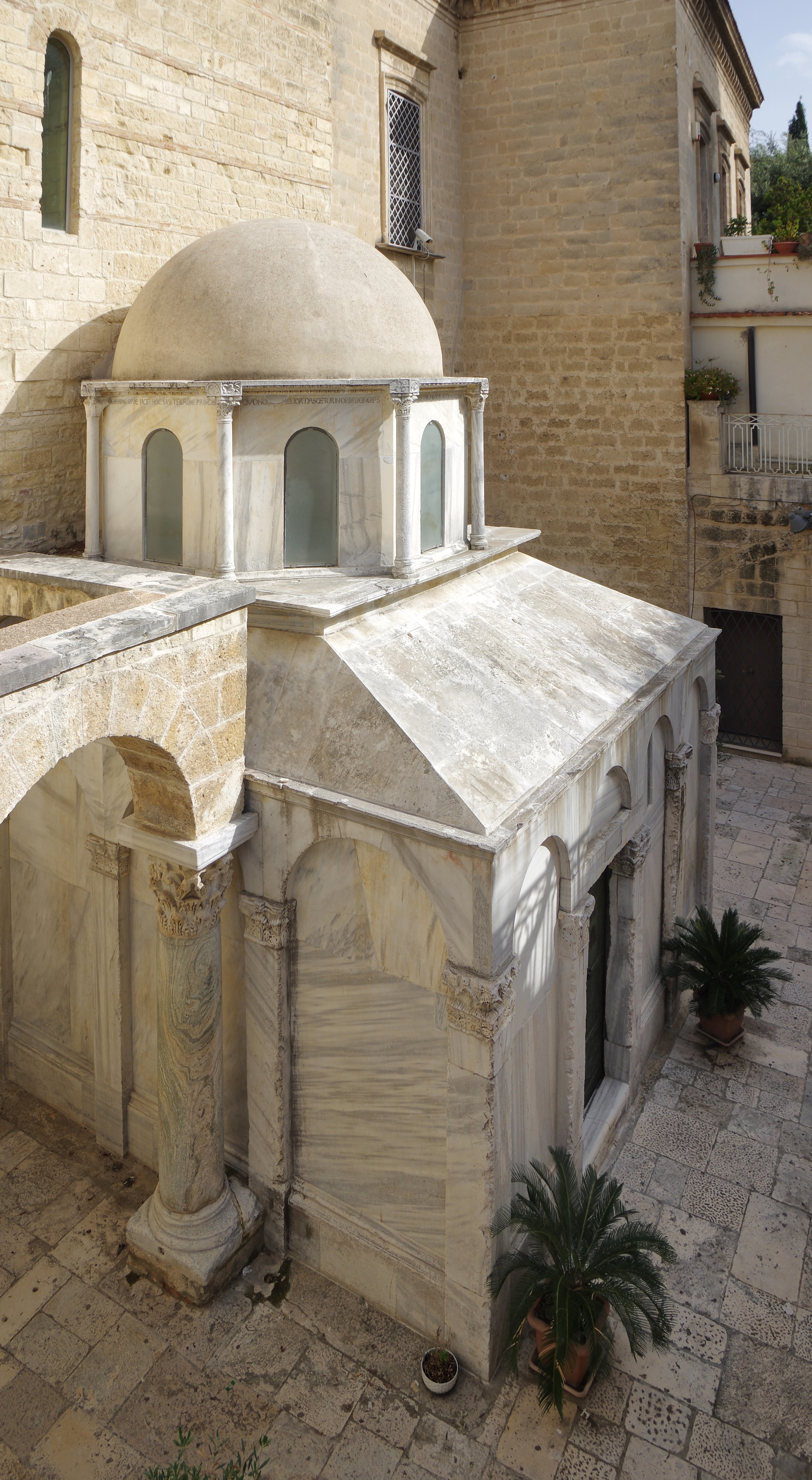
Mausoleum of Bohemond in Canosa di Puglia

Bohemond saw the root of his problems in Alexios and Constantinople when it came to preserving the Principality of Antioch. In a speech at the shrine of Saint-Léonard-de-Noblat in early 1106, written down by Bishop Walram of Naumburg, Bohemond said of the emperor:

He has oppressed many thousands of Christians with wicked treachery, some consigned to shipwreck, many to poison, more still to exile, and countless others he has handed over to pagans. This emperor is not a Christian but a mad heretic, Julian the Apostate, another Judas, friend of the Jews, pretending peace but inciting war, cut-throat to his brothers, a bloody Herod against Christ!

Bohemond was then resolved to use his newly recruited army of 34,000 men not to defend Antioch against the Greeks, but to attack Alexios. Bohemond took a route similar to the one that was successful for his father in Illyria and Greece. Alexios, aided by the Venetians, proved to be much stronger than when he faced Bohemond and Robert Guiscard in 1082–1084. Alexios was used to Norman battle tactics and their strength, and decided on a war of attrition rather than face them head on. During the Norman siege of Dyrrhachium of 1107–1108, Alexios blockaded the Norman camp until Bohemond was forced to negotiate.

Bohemond had to submit to a humiliating peace, all his ambitions destroyed. Under the Treaty of Deabolis in 1108, he became the vassal of Alexios with the title of sebastos, consented to receive Alexios' pay, and promised to cede disputed territories and to admit a Greek patriarch into Antioch. Henceforth, Bohemond was a broken man. He died without returning to Antioch. With one last jab at Alexios, by not returning to Antioch the Treaty of Deabolis became null and void as it only applied to Bohemond himself. Antioch was left in Norman hands with Bohemond's nephew Tancred.

Bohemond was buried at Canosa in Apulia, in 1111.

== Physical appearance ==
Byzantine princess Anna Komnene, in her Alexiad wrote a description of Bohemond's physical appearance; “The appearance of this man was, to put it briefly, unlike that of any other man whether Greek or barbarian seen in those days on Roman soil. The sight of him inspired admiration, the mention of his name terror. I will describe in detail the barbarian's characteristics. His stature was such that he towered almost a full cubit over the tallest men. He was slender of waist and flanks, with broad shoulders and chest, strong in the arms; overall he was neither too slender, nor too heavily built and fleshy, but perfectly proportioned - one might say that he conformed to the ideal of Polyklitos. His hands were large, he had a good firm stance, and his neck and back were compact. If to the astute and meticulous observer he appeared to stoop slightly, that was not caused by any weakness of the vertebrae of the lower spine, but presumably there was some malformation there from birth. The skin all over his body was very pale, except for his face which was pale but with some colour to it too. His hair was light-colored and did not go down to his shoulders as it does with other barbarians; in fact, the man had no great predilection for long hair, but cut his short, to the ears. Whether his beard was red or of any other color I cannot say, for the razor had passed over it closely, leaving his chin smoother than any marble. However, it seemed that it would have been red. His eyes were light-blue and gave some hint of the man's spirit and dignity. He breathed freely through nostrils that were broad, worthy of his chest and a fine outlet for the breath that came in gusts from his lungs."

== Bohemond I in literature and media ==
The anonymous Gesta Francorum was written by one of Bohemond's followers. The Alexiad of Anna Comnena is a primary authority for the whole of his life. A 1924 biography exists by R. B. Yewdale. See also the Gesta Tancredi by Ralph of Caen, which is a panegyric of Bohemond's second-in-command, Tancred. His career is discussed by B. von Kügler, Bohemund und Tancred (1862); while L. von Heinemann, Geschichte der Normannen in Sizilien und Unteritalien (1894), and Reinhold Röhricht's Geschichte des ersten Kreuzzuges (1901) and Geschichte des Königreichs Jerusalem (1898) may also be consulted for his history. The only major biography (of Tancred) that exists in English is "Tancred: a study of his career and work in their relation to the First Crusade and the establishment of the Latin states in Syria and Palestine" by Robert Lawrence Nicholson. Details of his pre-crusade career can found in Geoffrey Malaterra's Deeds of Count Roger....

Count Bohemund by Alfred Duggan (1964) is a historical novel concerning the life of Bohemond and its events up to the fall of Jerusalem to the crusaders. Bohemond also appears in the historical novel Silver Leopard by F. Van Wyck Mason (1955), the short story "The Track of Bohemond" in the collection The Road of Azrael by Robert E. Howard (1979) and in the fantastical novel Pilgermann by Russell Hoban (1983).

The historical fiction novel Wine of Satan (1949) written by Laverne Gay gives an embellished accounting of the life of Bohemond.

In his historical work "The Crusaders A Story of the War for the Holy Sepulcre", AJ Church details Bohemond's role in the chapter 'On the Taking of Antioch' Seeley, 1905.

The Crusades series by David Donachie (writing as Jack Ludlow) casts Bohemond as the main protagonist.

In Age of Empires II: Lords of the West, there are two campaigns relating to Bohemond for his victory against Alexios Kommenus and his defending against Kerbogha's siege of Antioch.

In Crusader Kings III, he appears in the 1066 start-date as Robert's oldest son at the age of 11.

== Sources ==
- Asbridge, Thomas (2000). The Creation of the Principality of Antioch, 1098–1130. Boydell Press. ISBN 978-0-85115-661-3.
- Barber, Malcolm (2012). The Crusader States. Yale University Press. ISBN 978-0-300-11312-9.
- Bartlett, Samuel Andrew (2008). God, Gold, or Glory: Norman Piety and the First Crusade (Master thesis). University of North Florida.
- Brown, Gordon S. (2003). The Norman Conquest of Southern Italy and Sicily. McFarland & Co., Inc. ISBN 978-0-7864-1472-7.
- Conti, Emanuele (1967). "L'abbazia della Matina (note storiche)". Archivio Storico per la Calabria e la Lucania. 35: 11–30.
- Fink, Harold S. (1969). "The Growth of the Latin States, 1118–1144". In Setton, Kenneth M.; Baldwin, Marshall W. (eds.). A History of the Crusades, Volume I: The First Hundred Years. The University of Wisconsin Press. pp. 368–409. ISBN 0-299-04844-6.
- Hailstone, Paula Z. (2019). Recalcitrant Crusaders?: The Relationship Between Southern Italy and Sicily, Crusading and the Crusader States, c. 1060–1198. Routledge. ISBN 978-1000764628.
- Lilie, Ralph-Johannes (1993). Byzantium and the Crusader States, 1096–1204. Oxford: Oxford University Press. ISBN 978-0-19-820407-7.
- Luscombe, David; Riley-Smith, Jonathan (2004). The New Cambridge Medieval History: Volume 4, c. 1024–c. 1198, Part II. Cambridge University Press.
- MacEvitt, Christopher (2010). The Crusades and the Christian World of the East: Rough Tolerance. University of Pennsylvania Press. ISBN 978-0-8122-4050-4.
- Morton, Nicholas (2020). The Crusader States and their Neighbours: A Military History, 1099–1187. Oxford University Press. ISBN 978-0192557988.
- Newman, Sharan (2014). Defending the City of God: A Medieval Queen, the First Crusades and the Quest for Peace in Jerusalem. St Martin's Publishing Group. ISBN 978-1137437839.
- Nicol, Donald M. (1992). Byzantium and Venice: A Study in Diplomatic and Cultural Relations. Cambridge University Press. ISBN 0-521-42894-7.
- Norwich, John Julius (1992). The Normans in Sicily. Penguin Books. ISBN 978-0-14-015212-8.
- Rubenstein, Jay (2011). Armies of Heaven: The First Crusade and the Quest for Apocalypse. New York: Basic Books.
- Runciman, Steven (1989a). A History of the Crusades, Volume I: The First Crusade and the Foundation of the Kingdom of Jerusalem. Cambridge University Press. ISBN 0-521-06161-X.
- Runciman, Steven (1989b). A History of the Crusades, Volume II: The Kingdom of Jerusalem and the Frankish East, 1100–1187. Cambridge University Press. ISBN 0-521-06162-8.
- Theotokis, Georgios (2014). The Norman Campaigns in the Balkans: 1081–1108 AD. Suffolk, UK: Boydell & Brewer.
- Theotokis, Georgios (2020). Bohemond of Taranto: Crusader and Conqueror. Pen & Sword Military.
- Tyerman, Christopher (2006). God's War: A New History of the Crusades. The Belknap Press of Harvard University Press. ISBN 978-0-674-02387-1.
- Yewdale, Ralph Bailey (1917). Bohemond I, Prince of Antioch (PhD thesis). Princeton University.

| New title | Prince of Taranto; 1088–1111 | Succeeded by Bohemond II |
| New title | Prince of Antioch; 1098–1111 | Succeeded by Bohemond II |
