= Expedition to Ikonion =

- Part of the Byzantine–Seljuk wars
- Asia minor in 12th century.
Date	Spring 1146
Location	Near Ikonion (Konya), Turkey
Result	Seljuk victory

Belligerents
Byzantine Empire	Seljuk Turks

Commanders and leaders
Manuel I Komnenos; Isaac Komnenos; John Axouch	Mesud I

Casualties and losses
Heavy	Unknown

The Expedition to Ikonion was a military campaign launched by the Byzantine Empire against the Seljuk capital of Ikonion (Konya) in the spring of 1146. The army besieged the city, but failed to capture it.

== Background ==
In 1143, the Danishmendid Sultan Melik Mehmed Gazi died, which resulted in a civil war between Melik Zünnun and his uncles Yağıbasan and Ayn el-Devle, which ended in the division of the Danishmend lands between them, with each three ruling their own territory. The Seljuk Sultan Mesud I decided to take advantage of the civil war and invade the Danishmendids. Mesud captured Sivas (Sebastea) and Yukarı Seyhan from Yağıbasan, defeating him, and captured Adana and Elbistan (Plastentia) from Ayn el-Devle; he then besieged Malatya (Melitene) from Melik Zünnun from 1143–1144, realizing they could not withstand Mesud's attack, they allied with the Byzantine Empire, which put Mesud in a two-front war and forced him to withdraw. In spring 1145, the Byzantine Emperor Manuel I Komnenos launched his first expedition but retreated upon getting ill or upon learning his sister Maria Komnene was ill. Upon this hasty withdrawal, the Seljuks thought the Byzantines were having internal problems and weren't ready to have a long conflict, which encouraged them to attack the Byzantines, which alerted Manuel and prepared him to attack them.

== Expedition ==
In the spring of 1146, Manuel prepared his expedition against the Seljuks; he then forced his way to Philomelion. The Seljuks made several ambushes during his journey; however, they were all repulsed with losses on the Seljuk side. He then reached Philomelion and successfully defeated the Seljuks there. Although Manuel was wounded in the heel, he burned the town and took the remaining Christian population there, Manuel then headed for Ikonion, Alarmed by Byzantine victories, Mesud divided his forces into 4 groups, one to protect the capital, the second stationed at Lake Tatta to ambush the Byzantines behind, the third at Outskirts of city and the last to slow down the incoming Byzantines, during their march, the Byzantines were still being ambushed by the Turks which inflicted losses on the Byzantines, they finally arrived at Ikonion and began ravaging the Outskirts of the capital, the Seljuks could only skirmish them from the walls, Manuel then besieged and surrounded the city, but failed to capture it, he prolonged the siege, however, he heard the news of an upcoming Crusade to the east, which prompted him to retreat.

During the retreat, he passed some of the rugged paths that caused the Byzantine march to be slow and unorganized, and for that, it was a chance for the Seljuks; they ambushed the Byzantines and inflicted heavy losses on the center of the army, which killed the commander Kritopolos. This attack split the army, which caused panic in the rear while they had no place to hide. Manuel attempted to reorganize his forces but failed due to heavy attacks. Manuel successfully reached safety after having great difficulty dealing with the Seljuk ambush; according to an anonymous Seljuk-nama, it claims that the Byzantines lost as many as 20,000 men.

== See also ==
- Komnenian army
- Battle of Myriokephalon

== Sources ==
- Birkenmeier, John W. (2002). "The Campaigns of Manuel I Komnenos". The Development of the Komnenian Army: 1081–1180. Brill. ISBN 90-04-11710-5.
