= John Tzelepes Komnenos =

Byzantine leader

John Komnenos (Greek: Ἰωάννης Κομνηνός, romanized: Iōannēs Komnēnos; born c. 1112), later surnamed Tzelepes (Τζελέπης, Tzelepēs), was the son of the sebastokrator Isaac Komnenos and grandson of the Byzantine emperor Alexios I Komnenos. As a young man he followed his father during his exile and wanderings across Asia Minor and the Levant, when for a short time he was married to a daughter of Leo I, ruler of Armenian Cilicia. After the reconciliation between his father and his uncle, Emperor John II Komnenos, in 1138, he returned to the Byzantine court, but defected in the next year to the Danishmendid Turks during a siege of Neocaesarea. From there he moved to the court of the Sultan of Rum, one of whose daughters he married. According to later, and likely invented, tradition, the Ottoman dynasty hailed from one of his offspring.

== Life ==
John was born in c. 1112 to the sebastokrator Isaac Komnenos, a younger son of Byzantine emperor Alexios I Komnenos (r. 1081–1118), and his wife Irene. Little is known about his mother.

=== Exile and wanderings ===
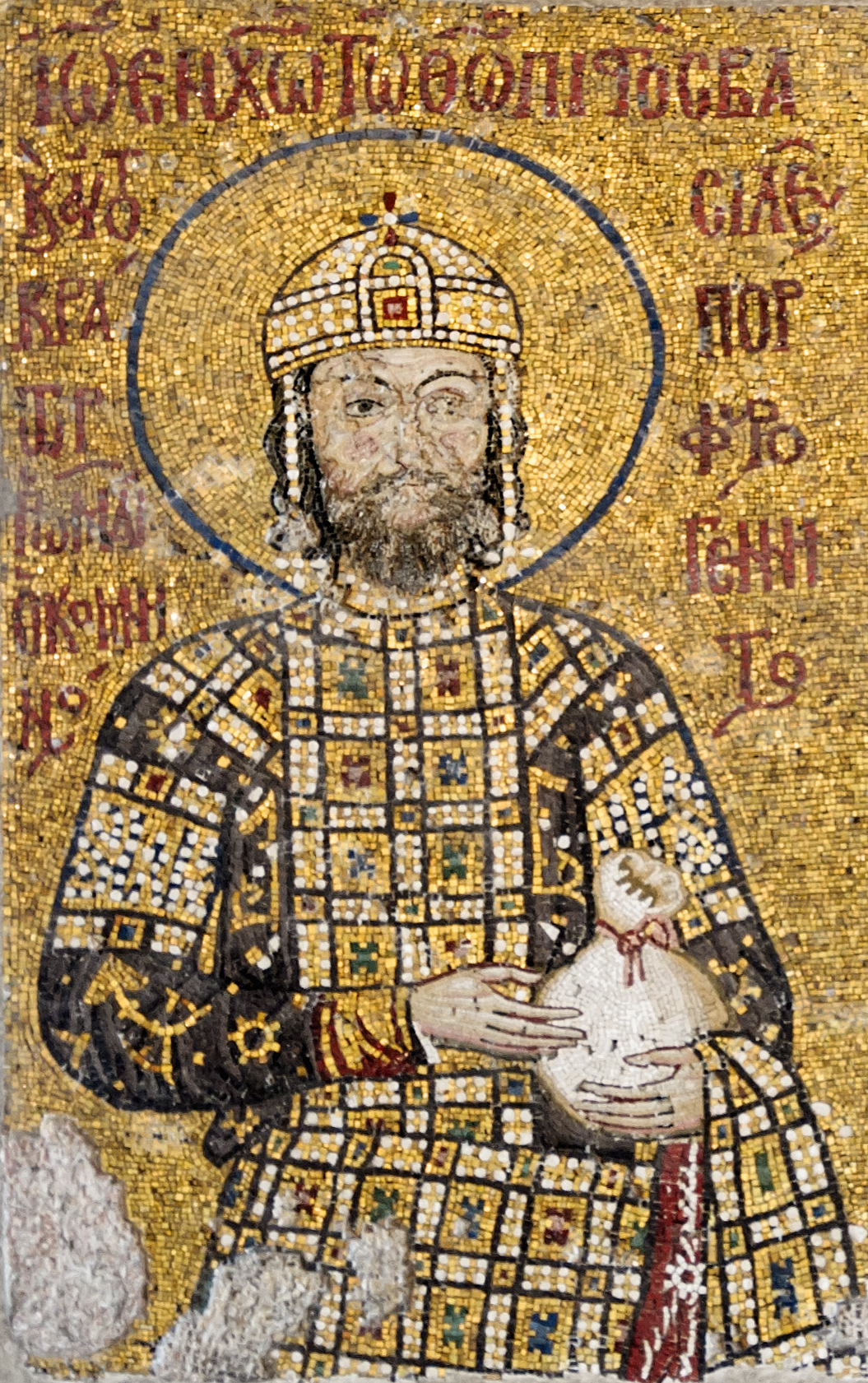
Emperor John II Komnenos, John's uncle (mosaic from the Hagia Sophia)

Relations between Isaac and his brother, John II Komnenos (r. 1118–1143) were cordial at first, but began to deteriorate, so that by 1130 they had become estranged. The reasons for this are left unexplained by the sources; Niketas Choniates and John Kinnamos simply report that Isaac had set his sights on the throne. In 1130, Isaac became involved in a conspiracy against John at a time when the latter was away from Constantinople, campaigning against the Seljuk Turks of the Sultanate of Rum. The conspiracy was uncovered, but Isaac and his two sons managed to flee Constantinople and find refuge at the court of the Danishmendid emir Gümüshtigin Ghazi (r. 1104–1134) at Melitene. John accompanied his father during his subsequent six-year exile, during which time they traversed most of Asia Minor and the Levant, as Isaac tried to rally the region's rulers to his cause against his brother.

From Melitene, they went to Trebizond, whose governor, Constantine Gabras, had broken away from Byzantium in 1126 and was ruling the area of Chaldia as an independent prince, and then to Armenian Cilicia, where its lord, Leo I, received them well: John even married one of Leo's daughters, and received the cities of Mopsuestia and Adana as her dowry. After a short while, however, they fell out with Leo, and were forced to seek shelter with the Sultan of Rum, Mesud I (r. 1116–1156), abandoning their possessions in Cilicia.

Isaac persisted in his efforts to form a coalition against his brother, but they proved fruitless, while John II's position continued to improve. The emperor's military successes, particularly following his Syrian campaign in 1137–1138 that led to the submission of the Principality of Antioch to the empire, enhanced his standing with the Byzantine aristocracy, officialdom, and the common people. As a result, Isaac's supporters in the empire began to desert his cause. Thus Isaac was forced to seek reconciliation with his brother: along with John, Isaac met his brother during the imperial army's return from Antioch in spring 1138. The emperor readily forgave them and brought them to Constantinople.

=== Defection and aftermath ===
In 1139, John accompanied the emperor on his campaign against Gümüshtigin's son and successor Melik Mehmed. The Byzantine army advanced to Mehmed's residence at Neocaesarea and laid siege to it. During a confrontation between the two armies, an incident led to the defection of John: seeing a distinguished Latin knight on foot, the emperor ordered John to give him his own, pure-blood Arab stallion. This demand enraged the prideful John, who refused to do so and challenged the Latin knight to a duel for the horse. Seeing his uncle frowning at his reaction, he gave up the horse, but immediately seized another horse and galloped to the Turkish camp. He was well received by Mehmed, who knew him from his previous exile. John readily divulged what information he was privy to about the weaknesses of the Byzantine army, chiefly a lack of supplies and horses; this act probably saved Neocaesarea from falling, and the emperor was left with no choice but to withdraw.

From Neocaesarea, John moved to the court of the Sultan Mesud I. There he converted to Islam and married one of the Sultan's daughters, whose name according to the 16th-century historian Pseudo-Sphrantzes was Kamero (Καμερώ). His subsequent life is obscure: neither the date of his death or any activities at the court of Iconium are known. He received many lands and much wealth, and was highly respected by the Turks for his erudition and his command of Arabic. His wife may have been the woman who led the defence of the Seljuq capital Iconium against the attacks of John's cousin, Emperor Manuel I Komnenos (r. 1143–1180). John was likely dead by that time.

=== Ottoman ancestry tradition ===
According to Pseudo-Sphrantzes, later tradition held that John assumed the name Tzelepes—a Greek rendering of the Turkish honorific Çelebi, a term indicating noble birth, a "lord" or "gentleman"—but Pseudo-Sphrantzes himself casts doubt on this information, and suggests that Tzelepes was another person entirely. According to this later tradition, John and his Seljuq wife had a son, Suleyman Shah, who proved a very capable leader and was active at about the time of the Fourth Crusade. This Suleyman Shah was supposedly the father of Ertuğrul, the forefather of the Ottoman dynasty. As Konstantinos Varzos points out, this descent is unlikely, purely due to the chronological distance of the persons involved, and has generally been dismissed as fictitious by modern scholars.

The historian Konstantinos Moustakas has traced the descent of Pseudo-Sphrantzes' report, via Francesco Sansovino's Annali Turcheschi, to a similar story recorded by Theodore Spandounes about the descent of the Seljuk sultan Kayqubad I (r. 1220–1237), who fits the timeframe in question. However, Spandounes himself considered this story as false, even though he also stresses that the Ottoman sultan Mehmed II, the conqueror of Constantinople, reportedly knew of it and disseminated it. Moustakas therefore suggests that the story arose in Mehmed II's court, not by the sultan himself, who rarely made use of the Byzantine imperial inheritance as a legitimizing device, but possibly among the convert recruits of aristocratic Christian origin who rose to high office and sought similar models in the past, such as Hersekzade Ahmed Pasha or Mesih Pasha.

== Sources ==
- Jurewicz, Oktawiusz (1970). Andronikos I. Komnenos (in German). Amsterdam: Adolf M. Hakkert. OCLC 567685925.
- Magdalino, Paul (2002) [1993]. The Empire of Manuel I Komnenos, 1143–1180 (Second ed.). Cambridge: Cambridge University Press. ISBN 9780521526531.
- Moustakas, Konstantinos (2015). "The myth of the Byzantine origins of the Osmanlis: an essay in interpretation". Byzantine and Modern Greek Studies. 39 (1): 85–97. doi:10.1179/0307013114Z.00000000054.
- Varzos, Konstantinos (1984). Η Γενεαλογία των Κομνηνών [The Genealogy of the Komnenoi] (PDF) (in Greek). Vol. A1. Thessaloniki: Centre for Byzantine Studies, University of Thessaloniki.
