= Siege of Neocaesarea =

Conflict between Byzantine army and Turks

Siege of Neocaesarea (1140)
- Part of the Byzantine–Seljuq wars
Date	February–Summer 1140
Location	Niksar, Turkey
Result	Turkish victory

Belligerents
Byzantine Empire	Danishmendids; Seljuk Turks

Commanders and leaders
John II Komnenos; Manuel Komnenos	Melik Mehmed Gazi; Mesud I

Casualties and losses
Heavy	Unknown

The Siege of Neocaesarea was a military engagement between the Byzantine army and Turks in the city of Neocaesarea. The Byzantine emperor, John II Komnenos, laid siege to the city but ended in failure, suffering heavy losses.

== Background ==
The Byzantine emperor, John II Komnenos, campaigned extensively against his enemies in Anatolia. He punished the Armenians and quarreled with the Crusaders. The Seljuks and the Danishmendids were expanding in Anatolia. This caused the emperor to march with a large army against the Danishmends' capital, Neocaesarea, and eliminate the power of the Anatolian Turks. The emperor also intended to depose Constantine Gabras and restore Trebizond. Earlier, in 1139, the Danishmendid ruler Melik Mehmed Gazi raided Bithynia and Paphlagonia. In the summer of the same year, the emperor marched and drove the Turks from Bithynia and Paphlagonia and subdued Constantine of Trebizond. He then began his campaign against Neocaesarea in February 1140.

Neocaesarea was a well-chosen target. Its capture could've led to the reconquest of Anatolia from the Turks and cut off both the remaining Danishmendid territories and the Seljuks of Rum from the rest of the Islamic world, which was surrounded by the Kingdom of Georgia and the County of Edessa.

== March ==
When the Byzantines began their march, their supplies were depleted, and many pack animals and horses died from cold weather. The Turks took advantage of this and harassed the Byzantines with constant hit-and-run tactics, decimating Byzantine phalanxes. The Turks engaged the Byzantines in an open battle at the Lykos River. The emperor was forced to create an elite squad of cavalry composed of skilled lancers among the Byzantines and Latins. The cavalry then charged at the Turks and routed them. Although victorious, the Byzantines were in a difficult position when they began the siege. The steep hills and narrow passes, while the sun blazed down and there was no water to drink, were challenging. At night the army was exposed to cold, all the while wearing armor in constant fear of attack.

== Siege ==
Neocaesarea was a well-defended city and naturally strong, surrounded by mountains, which made communications difficult. During the siege, long and bloody battles took place between both sides, during which the Byzantines suffered heavy losses. In one of the battles, A Byzantine division was losing to the Turks. The emperor's young son, Manuel Komnenos, charged to save them and showed bravery during the fight. Though the emperor publicly praised the young prince, he was furious and privately beat him for almost getting himself killed. Additionally, the Byzantines suffered from cold weather. One of the Byzantine princes, John, who was the nephew of the emperor, deserted his comrades and took refuge in the Seljuk Sultan's camp. There he converted to Islam and married the sultan's daughter. Depressed by this news and the heavy losses suffered, the emperor terminated his campaign and retreated in summer. The Turks chased the Byzantines and pressed on the rear guard, harassing it all the way to the northern coast.

== Aftermath ==
The emperor returned to Constantinople on 15 January 1141. The failure of the campaign opened the way for new Turkish conquests. The Seljuk Sultan advanced as far as the Antalya region. The next year, Melik Mehmed Gazi died, and a new civil war erupted between his heirs, which put them out of action. The emperor turned his attention towards Levant.

== Sources ==
- P. M. Holt, Ann K. S. Lambton & Bernard Lewis (1978), The Cambridge History of Islam: Volume 1A, The Central Islamic Lands from Pre-Islamic Times to the First World War.
- Steven Runciman (1987), A History of the Crusades, Vol II.
- Magoulias, Harry J., ed. (1984). O City of Byzantium: Annals of Niketas Choniatēs.
- Maximilian C. G. Lau (2023), Emperor John II Komnenos: Rebuilding New Rome 1118–1143.
