= Yağıbasan =

Danishmendid Emir from 1143 to 1164

- Melik; Emir
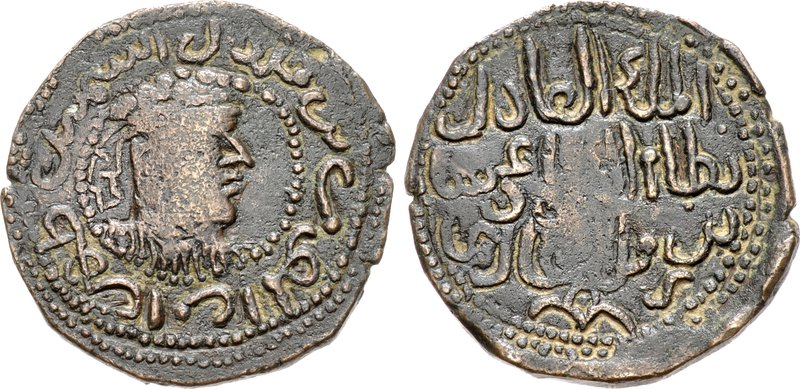
- Coinage of Nizam al-Din Yaghi Basan. AH 536–559 (1142–1164 CE) Sivas mint.
- Reign: 1143 – 1164
- Predecessor: Malik ZūnNūn
- Successor: Melik Mücahid Gazi
- Died: 1164; Çankırı, Sultanate of Rum, now Turkey
- Father: Emir Gazi

Nizamettin Yağıbasan, or simply Yağıbasan (meaning "enemy raider" or "smashing the enemy") was the sixth ruler of Danishmendids and the uncle of Melik Zünnun.

== Background ==
After the Seljuk Sultan Alp Arslan defeated the Byzantine army in the battle of Manzikert in 1071, a series of Turkmen beyliks (principalities) were established on former Byzantine territory in Anatolia before their unification under the Sultanate of Rum. The Danishmend dynasty were one of the most important families of this period, establishing a series of Beyliks centered around Samasota. Following the First Crusade they dominated they were for a brief period on equal footing with the weakened Seljuks.

== Civil war ==
Yağıbasan was the grandson of Gazi Gümüshtigin and son of Emir Gazi. Emir Gazi died in 1146 in Kayseri. His elder son Zinnun in Kayseri succeeded him. However, he was deposed by Yağıbasan who was residing in Sivas. Around this time, Yağıbasan became a subject of the Byzantine emperor Manuel I Komnenos as attested to by a Greek seal of Christ Emmanuel that reads "Ὁ δούλος τοῦ βασιλέως ἀμυρᾶς Ἰαγιπαζάνης" (Yağıbasan, emir and servant of the emperor).

After a further partition by a third brother in Malatya, the Danishmendid power began to decline. Mesut I of the Seljuks saw his chance to end the Danishmend dominance in Anatolia. He captured Sivas and in 1150 Yağıbasan agreed to be a vassal of the Seljuks.

== Wars against the Seljuks and the Artukids ==
In 1155, Mesut died and was succeeded by Kılıç Arslan II. Yağıbasan allied himself with the other Danishmend rulers and attacked Kılıç Arslan to gain the former status of the beylik. But in the battle of Aksaray he was defeated. Nevertheless, soon with the help of the Byzantine Empire, he was able to capture Elbistan from the Seljuks. He continued his campaigns and plundered several forts of the Artukids. By this policy he was caught in between the Seljuks and the Artukids. But, Seljuks of Syria reconciled them.

== Death ==
Yağıbasan died in 1164. He was succeeded by Melik Mucahid Gazi.

== Medreses of Yağıbasan ==
In Tokat, there is a medrese-mosque commissioned by Yağıbasan. The square plan medrese had been constructed in 1151. There is one other medrese also commissioned by Yağıbasan in Niksar.

== Bibliography ==
Oikonomidès, Nicholas. 'Les Danishmendides, entre Byzance, Bagdad et le sultanat d'Iconium,' Revue Numismatique 25 (1983), pp. 189-207.

Preceded by Malik ZūnNūn	Melik of the Danishmends; 1143–1164	Succeeded by Malik Mücahid Gazi
