= Battle of Şiran =

Battle of Şiran (1120)
- Part of the Byzantine–Seljuk wars
Date	1120
Location	Şiran
Result	Turkish victory

Belligerents
Sultanate of Rum; Artuqids; Danishmendids	Byzantine Empire; House of Mengüjek

Commanders and leaders
Belek Ghazi; Tughril Ghazi; Emir Gazi	Constantine Gabras (POW); Ibn Mengüjek (POW)

Strength
Unknown	Unknown

Casualties and losses
Unknown	5,000 killed or captured

The Battle of Şiran was a military engagement between a coalition of Turkish states and the Byzantines in the region of Şiran. The Turks were victorious in the battle.

== Background ==
During the years of 1118-1119, there was a regional conflict between the Danishmendids and the House of Mengüjek. The ruler of the Mengüjek emirate, Ishaq ibn Mengüjek, began expanding against the Danishmendids and Artuqids. This conflict resulted in Seljuk chiefs seeking truce or alliances with the Crusader states to deal with Ibn Mengüjek. The bey of Artuqids, Belek Ghazi, and the Seljuk chief, Tughril Arslan, joined together against Ibn Mengüjek. The two commanders also made an alliance with Emir Gazi, ruler of the Danishmendids. Seeing that he could not resist this joint attack, Ibn Mengüjek escaped and took refuge in Trabzon, which was under Byzantine control. The governor of Trabzon, Constantine Gabras, agreed to help the emir against his enemies.

== Battle ==
In the year 1120, the opposing armies advanced towards each other. The opposing armies met in the region of Şiran. The battle ended with the victory of the Turkish coalition against the Byzantine army. The Byzantines lost 5,000 killed or captured during the battle. Both Constantine and Ibn Mengüjek fell prisoner.

== Aftermath ==
Constantine ransomed himself for 30,000 dinars and was released, while Ibn Mengüjek was reconciled with Emir Gazi since both had family ties. Seeing this, Belek and Tughril felt disappointed by this reconciliation, as they hoped they would impose a humiliating peace treaty on him, thus preventing them from exploiting their victory, which soured relations between Belek and Emir Gazi. The battle also resulted in the final loss of Niksar to the Danishmendids.

== Sources ==
- Alexander Daniel Beihammer (2017), Byzantium and the Emergence of Muslim-Turkish Anatolia, Ca. 1040-1130.
- Anthony Bryer (1980), The Empire of Trebizond and the Pontos.
- Osman Turan (2013), History of Eastern Anatolian Turkish States (In Turkish).
- Yaşar Bedirhan (2022), History of the Seljuk State of Türkiye (In Turkish).
