= Battle of Gerger =

Battle of Gerger (1123)
- Part of the Crusades
- Location of Gerger
| Date | 18 April 1123 |
| Location | Gerger, Turkey |
| Result | Artuqid victory |

Belligerents
| Kingdom of Jerusalem | Artuqids |

Commanders and leaders
| (Kingdom of Jerusalem) Baldwin II of Jerusalem (POW) | Belek Ghazi |

Strength
| Unknown | Unknown |

Casualties and losses
| Heavy | Unknown |

The Battle of Gerger was a military engagement between the Latin Crusader army and the Artuqid Turks near the fortress of Gerger. The battle was a great victory for the Turks, who managed to capture King Baldwin II of Jerusalem.

== Background ==
The capture of Joscelin I, Count of Edessa, by Turks led by Belek Ghazi during the Battle of Saruj was a great blow to the Crusader states, though it did not affect the manpower of the Crusader states. This forced King Baldwin II of Jerusalem to take care of Edessa's administration.

In the meantime the Artuqid leader Ilghazi died, and his domains were inherited by his sons and nephews. Belek inherited the north and took Harran in the south. Baldwin decided to take advantage of Ilghazi's death. He first went to Edessa and placed Geoffrey the Monk as interim governor. He then decided to face Belek in order to free Joscelin.

== Battle ==
In the spring of 1123, Belek was besieging the fortress of Gerger which belonged to Edessa. Baldwin assembled his army against him. Hearing of this approach, Belek abandoned the siege temporarily to meet the Crusaders since his forces were already pillaging the surroundings. Baldwin encamped in a place called Nahr Al-Azrak in the Euphrates, not far from Gerger. Baldwin was unaware that Belek's forces were nearby.

On 18 April the Turks lured the Crusaders into an ambush and hurled the Crusaders with their main forces. The majority of the Crusaders were massacred, and Baldwin fell prisoner to the Turks. Gerger soon fell afterwards.

== Aftermath ==
Once again Baldwin and Joscelin found themselves prisoners, as they had been in 1104. The capture of Baldwin was a serious issue for the Crusader states, which deprived them of a capable leader. Belek, despite achieving a great victory, used it to expand his domains in Aleppo rather than destroy the Crusader states. Baldwin joined Joscelin in Harpoot.

In May 1123, a group of Armenians sneaked into Harpoot and managed to liberate the prisoners. Joscelin was able to escape, but Baldwin was besieged by the Turks and remained a prisoner until he was ransomed in June 1124.
