= Kazım Çelik =

Turkish association football player

Personal information
- Date of birth: January 6, 2000 (age 26)
- Place of birth: Melikgazi, Turkey
- Position: Forward

Youth career
- 2012–2016: Erkiletspor

Senior career*
Years	Team	Apps	(Gls)
2016–2017	Manavgatspor	16	(0)
2017–2018	Galatasaray	0	(0)
2018–2019	Kayserispor	1	(0)
2019	→ Tarsus İdman Yurdu (loan)	3	(0)
2021	Kırşehir Belediyespor	0	(0)
- * Club domestic league appearances and goals ‡ National team caps and goals as of 13:37, 23 July 2022 (UTC)

Kazım Çelik (born 6 January 2000) is a Turkish professional footballer who plays as a forward.

== Professional career ==
Çelik made his professional debut with Kayserispor in a 5-0 Süper Lig loss to Alanyaspor on 24 November 2018.
