= Belek Ghazi =

12th century Seljuk Turkish warlord

Ghazi Belek
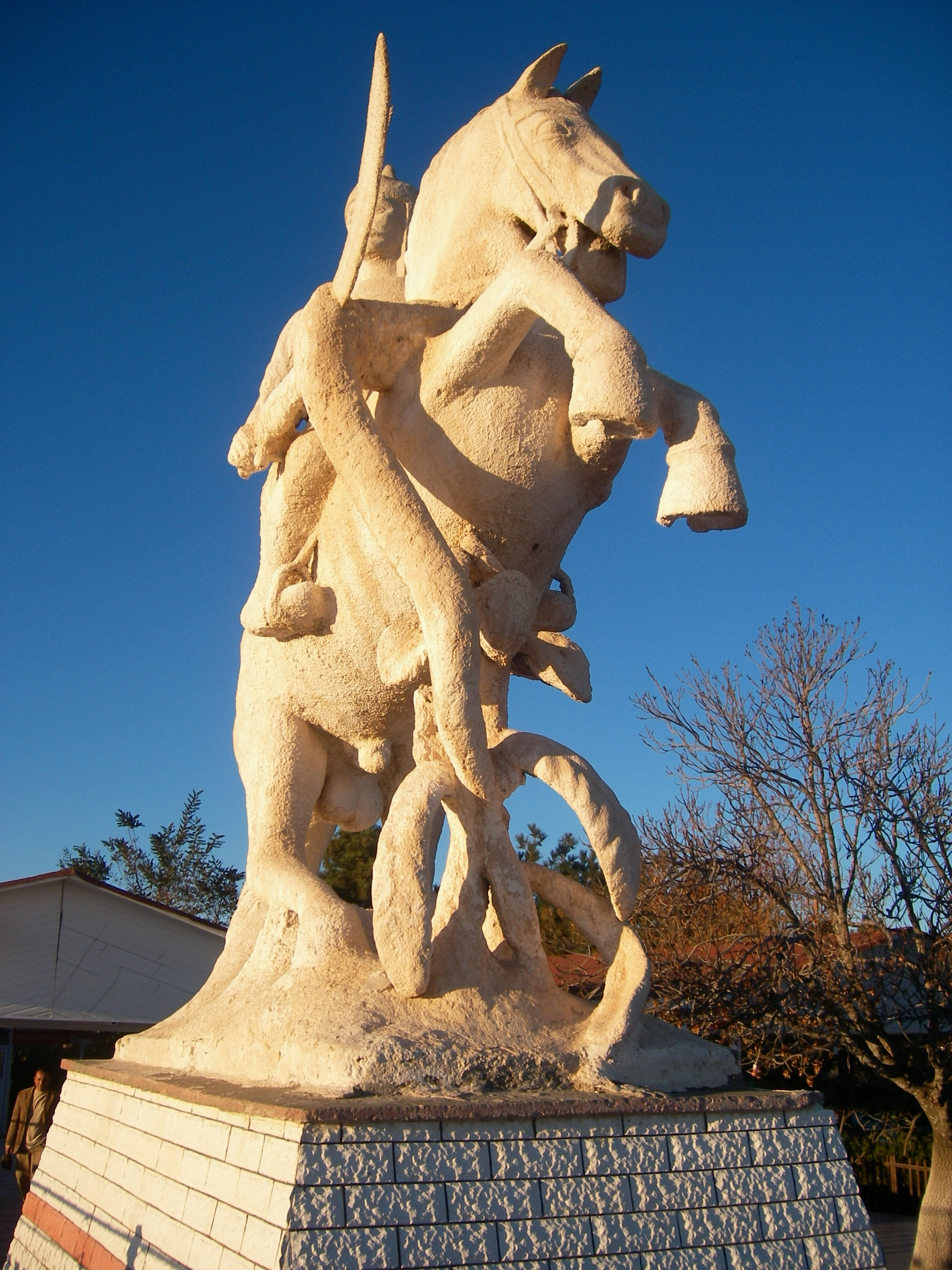
- Statue of Belek in Elazığ

Governor of Suruç
- In office 1095 (?) – 1098

Bey of Artukids
- In office 1112–1124

Personal details
- Born: unknown
- Died: 6 May 1124 Manbij

Military service
- Allegiance: Seljuq Empire
- Battles/wars: Battle of Şiran; Battle of Saruj; Battle of Gerger; Battle of Manbij (1124) †

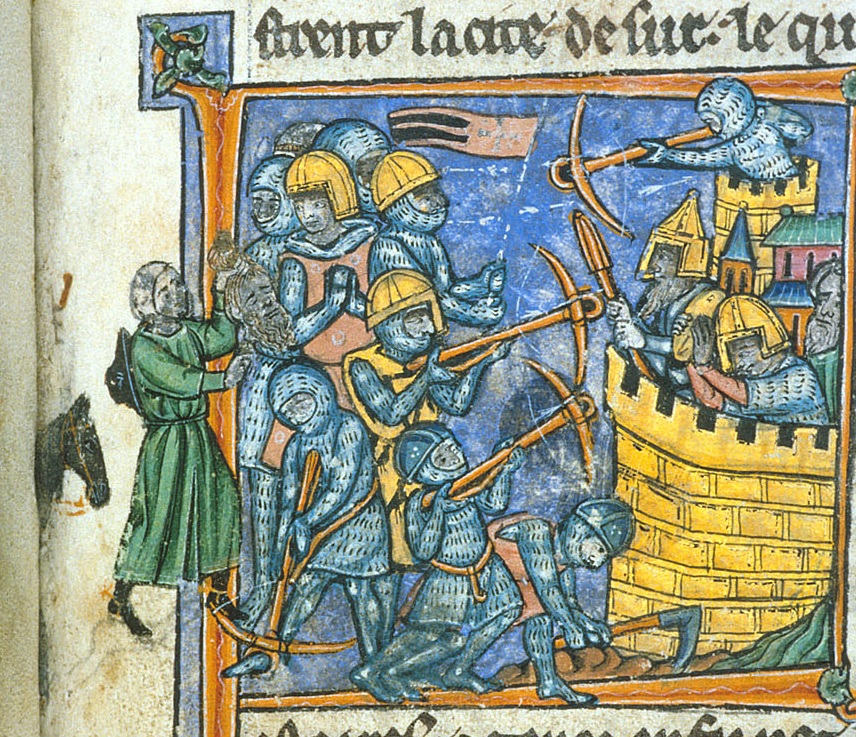
Illustration from the Estoire d'Eracles (British Library, Yates Thompson MS 12, dating to 1232–1261) showing the siege of Manbij (1124). Belek's head is being brandished by the besiegers.

Nur al-Dawla Belek bin Bahram Ghazi (Nuruddevle Belek or Balak) was a Turkish bey in the early 12th century.

== Early life ==
His father was Behram and his grandfather was Artuk Bey, an important figure of the Seljuk Empire in the 11th century. He was a short-term governor of Suruç (now a district center in Şanlıurfa Province of Turkey). The city was captured during the First Crusade in 1098. He took part in the Seljuk expedition to Antioch which was recently lost to Crusaders, but the campaign ended in failure. He was also present during the Crusade of 1101 which resulted in Seljuk victory.

== Beylik in Harput ==
In 1112, Belek captured Harput (an ancient city near to present day Elazığ in Turkey) from Mengüceks. (Note: The beylik of Mengüceks was an early Anatolian beylik.) He founded a beylik. This beylik is now known as the Harput branch of the Artukids (the other two being the Hasankeyf branch of Sökmen and Mardin branch of Ilghazi). Next year he married Ayşe Hatun, widow of Anatolian Seljuk sultan Kilij Arslan. By this prestigious marriage, he formed family ties with the Seljuk family.

In 1120, Belek together with Danishmends defeated a coalition of Mengüceks and Constantine Gabras of the Byzantine Empire. Two years later, after the death of Ilghazi, Belek became the leader of the Artukids. In 1122, he defeated the forces of the County of Edessa and took Joscelin I as captive. The next year, Baldwin II of Jerusalem too was captured by Belek. These two victories gained Belek fame both in Muslim countries and in Europe. From 1123 to 1124, Belek served as emir of Aleppo.

== Death and aftermath ==
In 1124, he was invited to defend Tyre, the only port the Muslims used in Syria against the attacking Crusaders. In the meantime, Belek was besieging Manbij, after he imprisoned its emir Hassan al-Ba'labakki ibn Gümüshtigin who pledged allegiance to Joscelin I, in which he managed to capture the city but the castle was still controlled by the defenders led by Hassan's brother Isa. A Crusader force led by Joscelin I tried to help the defenders, but Belek forced them to retreat to Turbessel (nowTilbaşar), and maintained the siege until he was hit and killed by an arrow on 6 May 1124. His cousin Husam al-Din Timurtash ibn Ilghazi took his dead body back to Aleppo on the next day. Shortly after his death Harput was annexed by the Artukids of Hasankeyf. Nevertheless, in 1185 another beylik was founded by Artukids in Harput.

== Bibliography ==
- Yücel, Yaşar; Sevim, Ali (1990). Türkiye Tarihi Cilt I. Ankara: AKDTYK Yayınları.
- Gurur (2014). "Belek (Balak) Gazi kimdir? Belek (Balak) Gazi hayatı, biyografisi, dönemi, hakkında bilgi" [Who is Belek (Balak) Gazi? Information about the life, biography, and era of Belek (Balak) Gazi]. Bilgi Dünyası. Archived from the original on 4 March 2016.
- Harari, Yuval Noah (2007). Special Operations in the Age of Chivalry 1100–1550. The Boydell Press. ISBN 978-1-84383-292-8.
- Purton, Peter Fraser (2009). A History of the Early Medieval Siege, C. 450-1220. Boydell & Brewer Ltd. ISBN 9781843834489.
- Richards, D. S. (2010). The Chronicle of Ibn Al-Athir for the Crusading Period from Al-Kamil Fi'L-Ta'Rikh.: The Years 491-541/1097-1146 the Coming of the Franks and the Muslim Response. Ashgate Publishing, Ltd. ISBN 9780754669500.
