= Melik Zünnun =

Anatolian Bey

- Melik
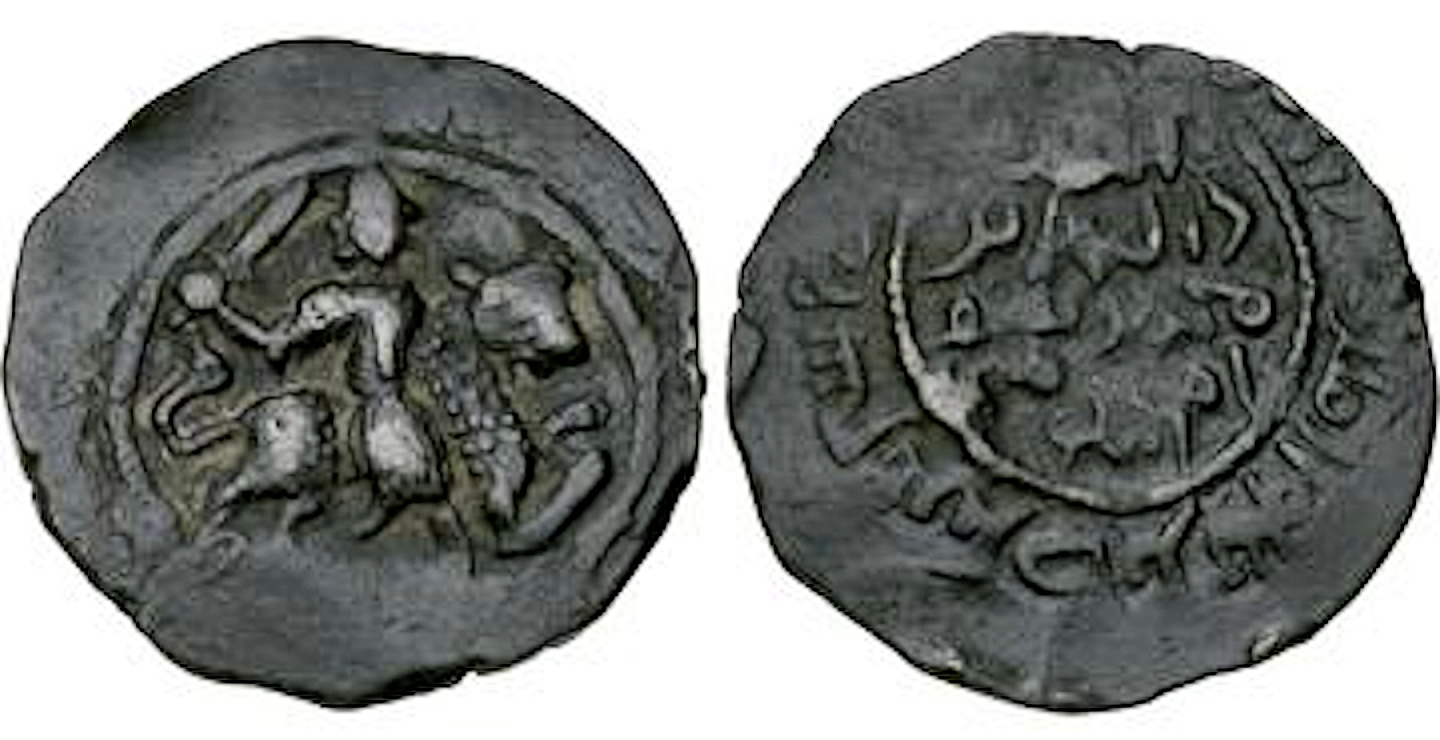
- Reign: 1142 – 1143 (first); 1172 – 1175 (second)
- Predecessor: Melik Mehmed Gazi (first); Melik Ismail (second)
- Successor: Yağıbasan (first); None (second)
- Died: 1175
- Father: Melik Mehmed Gazi

Melik Zünnun (died 1175) was the fifth ruler of the Danishmendids.

== Life ==
=== First reign ===
Zünnun was declared as successor by his father Melik Mehmed Gazi, however he was desposed by Yağıbasan. Yağıbasan and his other two brother Ayn el-Devle and Nasreddin Muhammed marched into Kayseri and Zünnun took refuge with his father-in-law Mesud I. Mesud wanted to incorporate the Danishmend domain into his own Sultanate of Rum.

=== Second reign ===
After Melik İsmail was killed in a palace revolt, Zünnun was in Syria at the time. With the support of Nuraddin Zengi, he entered Sivas with 3,000 troops. However after death of Nur ad-Din, the troops returned to Syria. Kilijarslan II started to attack the Danishmendids and took Sivas, Niksar and Tokat.

Zünnun took refuge in the Byzantine Empire, and the Sivas branch of Danishmendids collapsed.

Preceded by Melik Mehmed Gazi	Melik of the Danishmends (first rule); 1142–1143	Succeeded by Yağıbasan

Preceded by Melik Ismail	Melik of the Danishmends (second rule); 1172–1174	Succeeded by End of Beylik
