= Fall of Turbessel =

Turks victory over the Byzantines, 1151

Date	1151
Location	Turbessel
Result	Muslim victory

Belligerents
Zengids; Sultanate of Rum; Artuqids	Byzantine Empire

Commanders and leaders
Nur ad-Din Zengi; Mesud I Kara Arslan; Timurtash	Manuel I Komnenos

Strength
Unknown	Unknown

Casualties and losses
Unknown	Unknown

The Fall of Turbessel occurred in 1151 when the Turks seized Turbessel as well as other possessions that Joscelin II had just ceded to the Byzantines.

Following the fall of Edessa, Joscelin II made Turbessel his new capital. He was taken captive by Nur ad-Din Zengi in 1150 and his wife, Beatrice of Saone took over; however, she was forced to cede Turbessel and other possessions to the Byzantines.

In the spring of 1151, Nur ad-Din allied with Mesud and invaded the Byzantine territories, joined by Timurtash and Kara Arslan. The Byzantine garrisons were unable to resist the attacks and as a result Timurtash now ruled in Bira, Samosata, Cafersoud, Khourous and Qal'at ar-Rum, Mesud in Aintab and Duluk and Nur ad-Din in Azaz, Cyrrhus, Krak des Chevaliers, Tall-Khalid, Ravendan, Hisn Kerzin and Nahr al-Djauz. As well as Turbessel, Burj al-Raṣāṣ and Kafarlatha also fell to the Turks.
