= Danishmend Gazi =

Founder of the Anatolian beylik of Danishmends (11th century AD)

- Bey; Emir; Gazi

Melik of the Danishmends
- Reign: 1071/1075 – 1085
- Predecessor: Position established
- Successor: Gazi Gümüshtigin
- Died: 1085; Cappadocia (modern-day Turkey)
- Father: Ali Taylu al-Türkmānī
- Religion: Islam

Danishmend Gazi (Persian: دانشمند غازی), Danishmend Taylu, or Dānishmend Aḥmed Gāzī (died 1085), was the Turkoman general of the Seljuks and later founder of the beylik of Danishmends. After the Turkic advance into Anatolia that followed the Battle of Manzikert, his dynasty controlled the north-central regions in Anatolia.

== Life ==
The defeat of the Byzantine army at the Battle of Manzikert and the subsequent civil war allowed the Turks, including forces loyal to Danishmend Gazi, to occupy nearly all of Anatolia. Danishmend Gazi and his forces took as their lands central Anatolia, conquering the cities of Neocaesarea, Tokat, Sivas, and Euchaita from the Byzantine Empire.

According to Michael the Syrian, he ruled Cappadocia in 1085, and most likely died the same year. However, Amin Maalouf claims in The Crusades Through Arab Eyes that Danishmend Gazi answered the call of Kilij Arslan to defend Asia Minor from incursions by Christian forces during the First Crusade in 1097. He was succeeded by his son Gazi Gümüshtigin.

== Legend ==
Danishmend Gazi is the central figure in the Danishmendnâme ("Tale of Danishmend"), a 13th-century Turkish-language epic romance. In this allegory, events from the life of Danishmend Gazi are blended with the legendary exploits of the 8th-century Arab warrior Sayyid Battal Gazi and of the Persian hero Abu Muslim of the early Abbasid period.

The legends that comprise Danishmendnâme were compiled from Turkish oral tradition for the first time by order of the Seljuk Sultan Kayqubad I, a century after Danishmend's death. The final form that has reached our day is a compendium that was put together under the instructions of the early 15th century Ottoman sultan Murad II.

== Name ==
There is also some confusion concerning his name and a measure of divergence among scholars regarding the names used for him. He had the same name as his son, Gümüştekin. The father is often referred to shortly as Danishmend Gazi, while his son is called Gazi Gümüştekin. Furthermore, the Danishmend dynasty is also cited as having a family tie to the Seljuk dynasty. He was the maternal uncle to the Seljuk ruler Suleiman ibn Qutulmish.

== Notes ==
New title	Melik of the Danishmends; 1071–1084	Succeeded by Gazi Gümüshtigin
