= Ağırnas =

- Neighbourhood
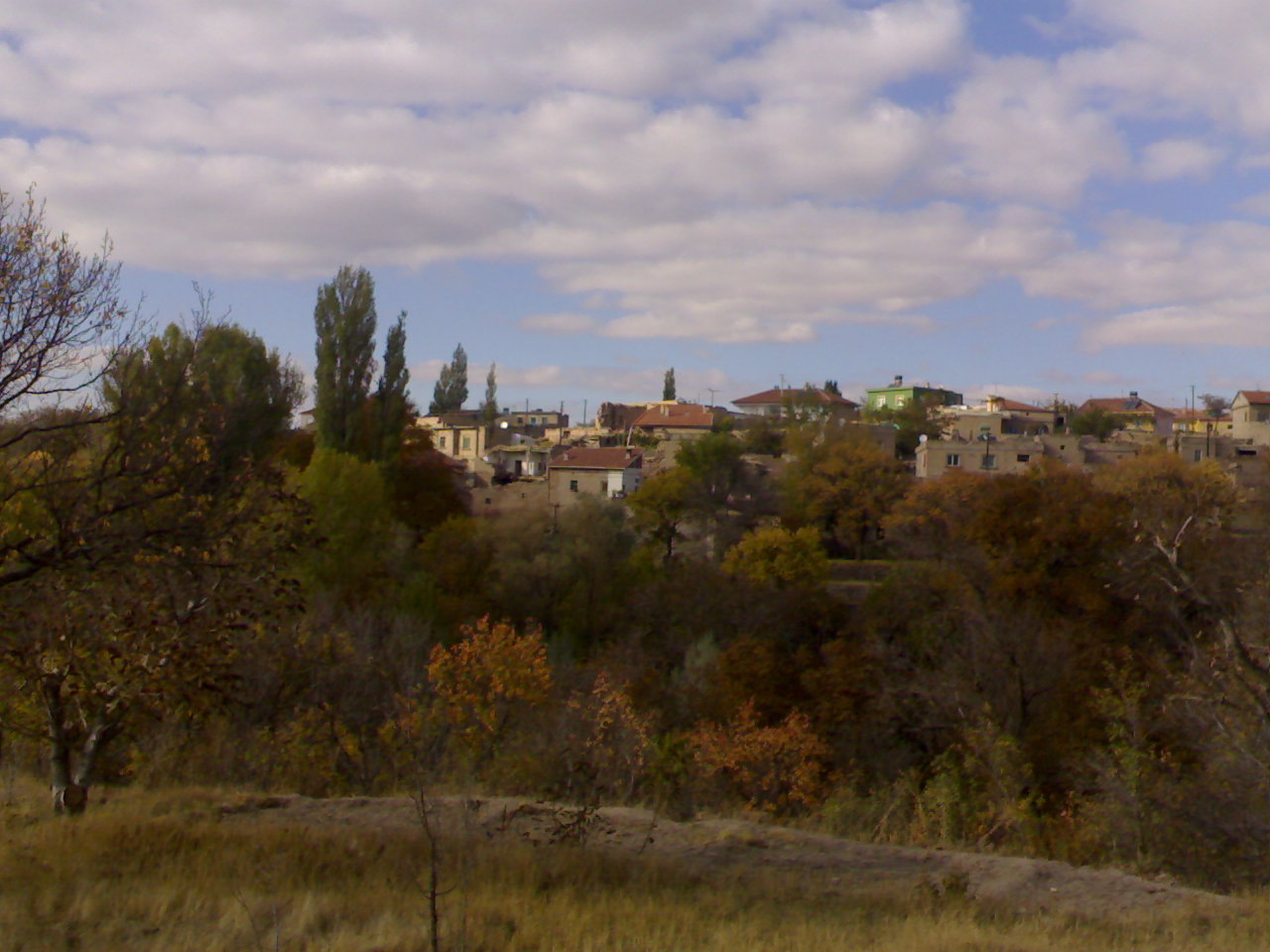
- Sinan House in Ağırnas

- Location within Turkey Location within Turkey Central Anatolia
- Coordinates: 38°48′58″N 35°43′03″E
- Country: Turkey
- Province: Kayseri
- District: Melikgazi
- Population (2022): 2,554
- Time zone: UTC+3 (TRT)
- Area code: 0352

Ağırnas is a neighbourhood of the municipality and district of Melikgazi, Kayseri Province, Turkey. Its population is 2,554 (2022). Before the 2013 reorganisation, it was a town (belde). It lies at a distance of 24 km (15 mi) from central Kayseri.

== History ==
Ağırnas is the birthplace of Mimar Sinan, the architect who worked under Suleiman the Magnificent, and is a site rich in historic buildings. One recently restored house is associated with Sinan himself.

=== Underground city ===
Although they remain far from having been explored in full, the town appears to extend for quite a length below the ground as well, which is not uncommon for Cappadocia and Ağırnas may well be sharing the characteristics and become the next in line to neighboring underground localities such as Derinkuyu and Kaymaklı Underground City. Caves and subterranean vaults and passages, complete in chapels, dining rooms, cells and perhaps even dungeons and torture rooms, are for the moment partially open to public with Sinan house's cellar as departure point.

== See also ==
- Underground cities in Cappadocia
- Archaeological sites in the Central Anatolia region
