= Emir Gazi =

Anatolian Bey

- Melik; Emir; Ghazi
- Reign: 1104 – 1134
- Predecessor: Gazi Gümüshtigin
- Successor: Melik Mehmed Gazi
- Died: September 1134; Sivas, Danishmendids, now Turkey
- Father: Gazi Gümüshtigin

Emir Gazi (Ancient Greek: Ἀμὴρ Γαζής) also known as Emir Melikgazi was the third ruler of Danishmendids and the elder son of Gazi Gümüshtigin.

== Life ==
After Gazi Gümüshtigin's death, the country was divided into two. Emir Gazi ruled Sivas and surrounding, while his brother Sungur took Malatya. Sungur, later joined Sultanate of Rum which was under control of Kilij Arslan I. Emir Gazi was the father-in-law of Mesud I, son of Kilij Arslan I. After Kilij's death, in 1107, he supported Mesud, which resulted with him taking the throne in 1116. After this Emir Gazi expanded his powers.

He supported Mesud against Mesud's brother Melik Arab. In 1127, Melik Arab ambushed Emir Gazi's son Melik Mehmed Gazi and took him as prisoner. Later Melik Arab marched on Emir Gazi which was resulted in heavy losses. Later he took refuge to Byzantines.

In 1130, he allied with Leo I, Prince of Armenia against the crusader Bohemond II of Antioch, who was killed in the subsequent battle; Bohemond's head was embalmed and sent to the Abbasid caliph in Baghdad. Emir Gazi may have been able to conquer more territory in the Principality of Antioch if not for the intervention of Byzantine emperor John II Komnenos, who wished to exert his own influence in Antioch.

In 1131, he besieged the castle of Kaysun (today near the village of Çakırhüyük) in the County of Edessa, but retreated upon the arrival of Count Joscelin, whom Melikgazi believed had already died.

Because of his military successes, the Abbasid caliph Al-Mustarshid recognized Gazi as Melik (king) shortly before his death in 1134, after which the Danishmend state began to collapse under pressure from the Byzantines and the Sultanate of Rum.

Preceded by Gazi Gümüshtigin	Melik of the Danishmends; 1104–1134	Succeeded by Melik Mehmed Gazi
