= Melik Mehmed Gazi =

Emir of the Danishmendids from 1134 to 1142

- Melik; Emir; Ghazi
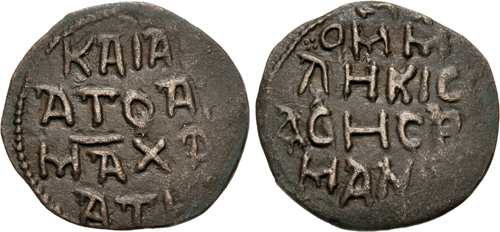
- Coin of Malik Muhammad, which reads as follows: "The Grand malik of all Romania and the East, Muhammad"
- Reign: 1134–1142
- Predecessor: Emir Gazi
- Successor: Melik Zünnun
- Born: c. 1100
- Died: 6 December 1142; Melikgazi, Danishmendids, now Turkey
- Issue: Ibrahim; Dhu’l Nun
- Father: Emir Gazi

Melik Mehmed (Ancient Greek: Μελήκις Μαχαμάτης) or Muhammad Ghazi, (died 1142) was the fourth ruler of the Danishmendids.

== Life ==
=== Early life ===
Mehmed was one of the sons of the Danishmendid Emir Gazi. During his father's reign, Mehmed served under his father in various military campaigns, first appearing in 1124 when the young Mehmed captured the important city Melitene on his father's behalf. In 1127, Mehmed was himself captured by the Armenian prince Thoros and the Seljuk prince Arab, who imprisoned Mehmed at his capital of Ankara before his father took the city in a siege, freeing Mehmed.

=== Reign ===
Mehmed later succeeded his father as melik (king) upon the latter's death in 1134, but was soon beset by revolts from his two brothers Yaghi and Ayn al-Dawla. Sensing weakness, the Roman emperor John II Komnenos campaigned against Mehmed in the winter of 1135 and captured the city of Kastamon, but Mehmed was able to prevent any further losses by persuading his brother-in-law the Sultan of Iconium Mesud I to abandon his alliance with John.

By 1137, Mehmed had stabilised his realm and prepared a campaign to expand his domain at the expense of John II, adopting the title "Great Melik of all Rhōmanía and the East" (Ancient Greek: μέγας μελίκης πάσης 'Ρωμανίας καὶ Ἀνατολῆς) to symbolise his claim to the Roman territories in Anatolia. First, Mehmed renewed the Danishmendid-Seljuk alliance by marrying his second son Dhu’l Nun to a daughter of Meusd. Then he attacked John's Crusader subjects in Marash but failed to make any major territorial gains. After withdrawing north, John, at Antioch at the time, came to his subject's aid, capturing the key fortress of Kapniskerti from Mehmed. The following year, an Armenian source records that Mehmed was again campaigning in Cilicia.

Mehmed's fortunes reversed after the emperor returned to Constantinople in 1139. Danishmendid forces simultaneously invaded Bithynia and Cilicia and Kapniskerti, as well as another fortress Vakha, were retaken by Mehmed. By the end of the year John was back in Anatolia, but a Pyrrhic victory against Mehmed's larger force in February 1140 meant the emperor had to again return to Constantinople in order to rebuild his army.

=== Death ===
Mehmed died on 6 December 1142 before Komnenos could begin his next invasion, the emperor himself dying the following April. Mehmed was succeeded as melik by his second son Dhu’l Nun, but civil war again broke out amongst the Danishmendid as Mehmed's brothers and other sons refused to recognise Dhu’l Nun's appointment.

Mehmet'd body was mummified. His Kümbet is in Melikgazi, Kayseri. His mummy was vandalized in 1935, cutting off one of his hands. In 1978, the mummy was partially burned.

== Bibliography ==
- Lau, Maximilian C. G. (2023). Emperor John II Komnenos: Rebuilding New Rome 1118-1143. Oxford University Press. ISBN 978-0-19-888867-3

Preceded by Emir Gazi	Melik of the Danishmends; 1134–1142	Succeeded by Melik Zünnun
