= Battle of Saruj =

Battle of Saruj (1122)
- Part of the Crusades
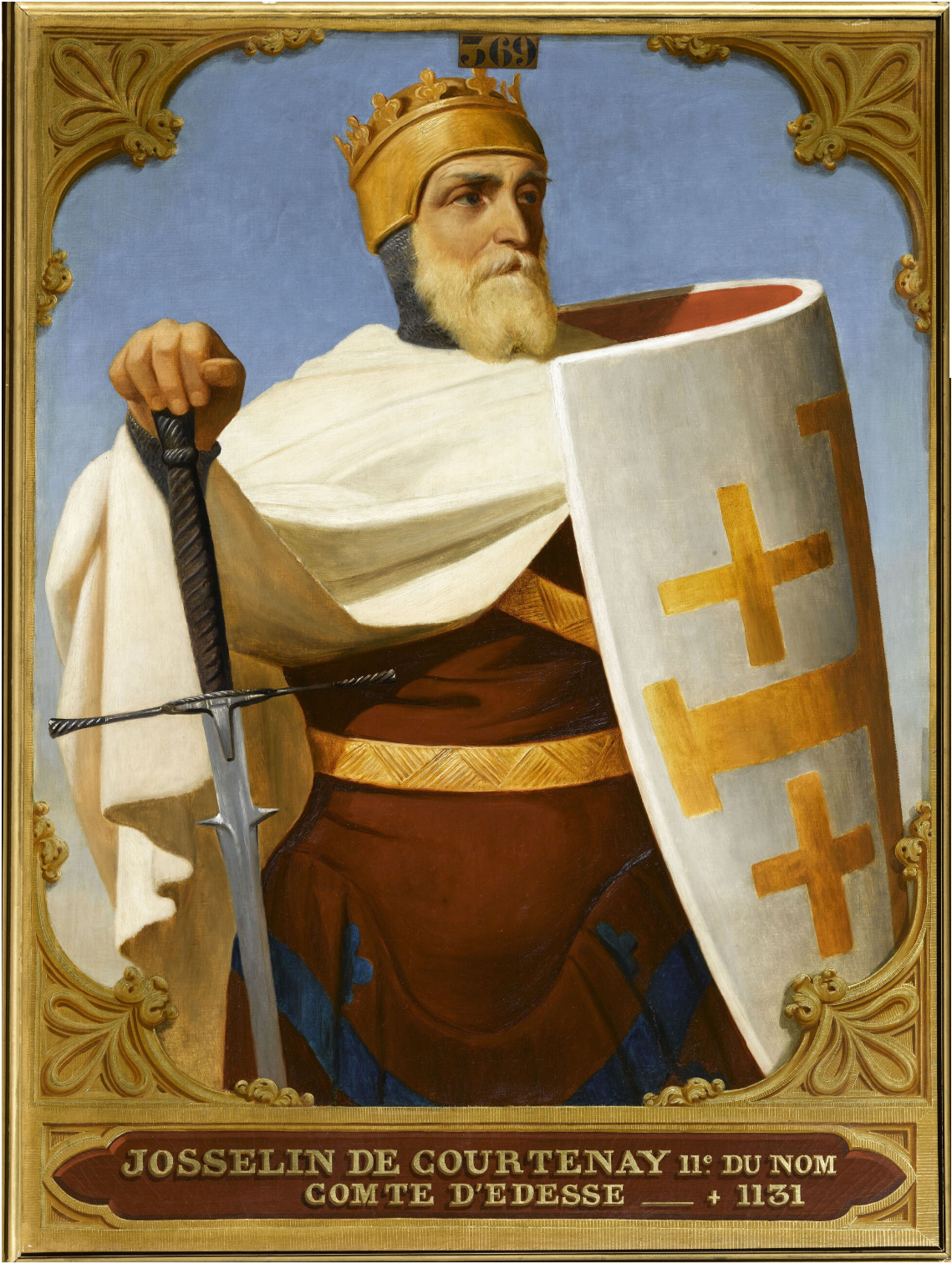
- Joscelin, Count of Edessa
Date	13 September 1122
Location	Suruç, Turkey
Result	Artuqid victory

Belligerents
County of Edessa	Artuqids

Commanders and leaders
Joscelin I (POW)	Belek Ghazi

Strength
100 knights	800 cavalry

Casualties and losses
Heavy: 25 or 60 captured	Unknown

The Battle of Saruj was a military engagement between the Atruqid Turks and the Crusader County of Edessa. The Atruqids, led by Belek Ghazi, defeated and captured Joscelin I, Count of Edessa.

== Background ==
In June 1122 the Artuqid emir Ilghazi resumed his war against the Crusaders. Ilghazi was joined by his nephew Belek Ghazi and Toghtekin. Together they attacked the Principality of Antioch. King Baldwin II of Jerusalem was in Tripoli enforcing the rule of Pons, Count of Tripoli. When Baldwin heard of the invasion, he rode out with a relief force. Ilghazi was forced to retreat, and no military engagement happened. Ilghazi fell ill and withdrew to Aleppo, while Toghtekin withdrew to Damascus. Belek went home to his emirate near Malatya. As Belek marched towards the territory of the County of Edessa, Joscelin I heard of his passing, and he set out with a force of 100 knights to intercept him.

== Battle ==
Hearing of the Crusader force coming to meet him, Belek prepared to meet him in battle. Belek's troops numbered 800 cavalry. Belek picked his battlefield, leading the Crusaders into a marshy territory after a long chase. On 13 September the Crusaders ended in a low ground near beside a river near Suruç. The Crusaders were stuck; their horses, which carried heavy armored knights, sank into the mud. The Turks then attacked the Crusaders with a barrage of arrows, killing many of them. Joscelin and other leaders surrendered and were captured by the Turks. They captured around 25 prisoners, while other sources state 60.

== Aftermath ==
The capture of Joscelin was a notable victory for Belek, which gave him a reputation from contemporary writers. Belek's power grew further after the death of his uncle Ilghazi, after which he inherited his territory. Belek offered freedom for Joscelin if he were to surrender Edessa, but he refused. Belek took the prisoners to his fortress of Harpoot. Belek then continued to fight against the Crusaders. The capture of Joscelin forced Baldwin into a war against Belek to liberate the captured prisoners.
