= Melikgazi =

- District and municipality
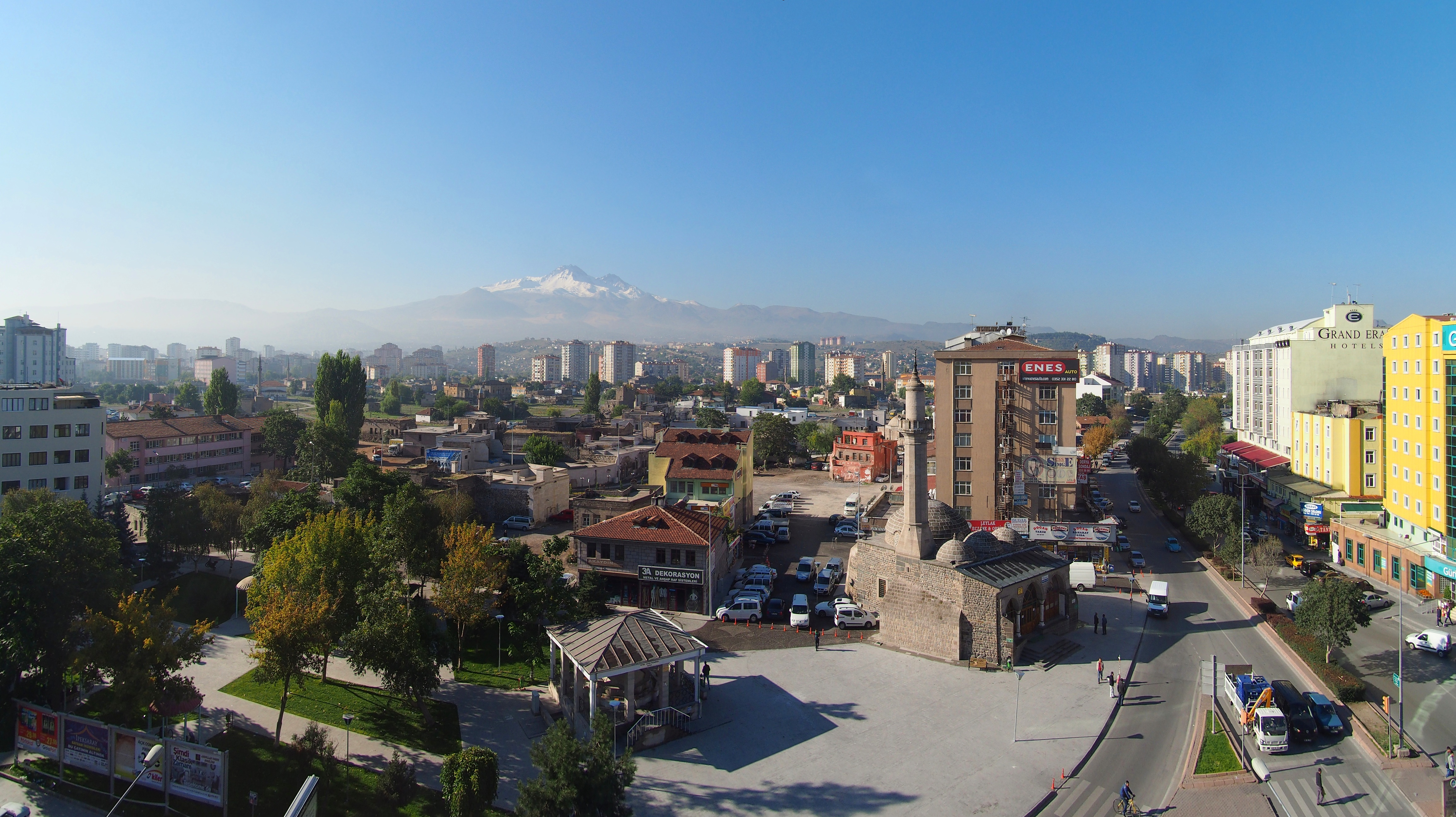
- Aerial view of Melikgazi

- Logo

- Map showing Melikgazi District in Kayseri Province

- Location within Turkey Location within Turkey Central Anatolia
- Coordinates: 38°43′N 35°30′E
- Country: Turkey
- Province: Kayseri

Government
  - Mayor: Mustafa Palancıoğlu (AKP)
- Area: 668 km^{2} (258 sq mi)
- Population (2022): 594,344
  - Density: 890/km^{2} (2,300/sq mi)
- Time zone: UTC+3 (TRT)
- Area code: 0352
- Website: www.melikgazi.bel.tr

Melikgazi is a municipality and district of Kayseri Province, Turkey. Its area is 668 km^{2}, and its population is 594,344 (2022). It covers the southern and eastern part of the agglomeration of Kayseri and the adjacent countryside.

== Political structure ==
The district Melikgazi was created in 1998 from part of the former central district of Kayseri, along with the district Kocasinan. At the 2013 Turkish local government reorganisation, the rural part of the district was integrated into the municipality, the villages becoming neighbourhoods. The mayor is Mustafa Palancıoğlu (AKP).

== Composition ==
There are 57 neighbourhoods in Melikgazi District:

- 19 Mayıs
- 30 Ağustos
- Ağırnas
- Alpaslan
- Altınoluk
- Anafartalar
- Anbar
- Aydınlıkevler
- Bağpınar
- Bahçelievler
- Battalgazi
- Becen
- Büyük Bürüngüz
- Cumhuriyet
- Danişmentgazi
- Demokrasi
- Eğribucak
- Erenköy
- Esentepe
- Esenyurt
- Fatih
- Germir
- Gesi Fatih
- Gökkent
- Gültepe
- Gülük
- Gürpınar
- Güzelköy
- Hisarcık
- Hunat
- Hürriyet
- İldem Cumhuriyet
- Kayabağ
- Kazımkarabekir
- Keykubrat
- Kılıçaslan
- Kıranardı
- Kocatepe
- Köşk
- Küçükbürüngüz
- Mimarsinan
- Osman Kavuncu
- Osmanlı
- Sakarya
- Sarımsaklı
- Selçuklu
- Selimiye
- Şirintepe
- Subaşı
- Tacettin Veli
- Tavlusun
- Tınaztepe
- Turan
- Vekse
- Yeniköy
- Yeşilyurt
- Yıldırım Beyazıt

== Notable citizens ==
- Mimar Sinan, Ottoman architect (born around 1488 in Ağırnas )
