= Gazi Gümüshtigin =

- Melik; Emir; Bey; Gazi

Melik of the Danishmends
- Reign: 1084 – 1104
- Predecessor: Danishmend Gazi
- Successor: Emir Gazi
- Died: 1104
- Father: Danishmend Gazi
- Religion: Islam

Gazi Gümüshtigin (died 1104), also known as Melikgazi Gümüshtigin, was the second ruler of the Danishmendids which his father Danishmend Gazi had founded in central-eastern Anatolia after the Battle of Manzikert.

== Biography ==
Gümüshtigin's possessions in Anatolia in 1097

He succeeded his father when the father died in 1084. Gümüshtigin used deliberately Byzantine imagery in his coins with one side showing a nimbused Christ and the other a Greek inscription which entitled him as "the great amir" to assert his authority.

During the First Crusade, he was directly on the path of the advancing Crusaders and was on the losing side at the Battle of Dorylaeum in 1097. After the end of the First Crusade, he was able to capture Bohemond I of Antioch in August 1100 and the city of Melitene from its Armenian ruler Gabriel in 1101. The Byzantine emperor Alexios I Komnenos offered Gümüshtigin 260,000 bezants, but the offer fell flat because the Seljuk sultan of Rum was denied a share, starting a conflict between the Danishmendids and the Seljuks of Rum. Bohemond then convinced Gümüshtigin to accept 100,000 bezants which was then raised by his allies so that he was released in May 1103.

Shortly after his capture of Antalya in 1104 from the Byzantines, he died of an illness and the Byzantines recovered the city. Similarly, the Seljuks under Kilij Arslan I were able to take control of Malatya in 1106.

== In popular culture ==
Mehmet Polat appears as a character called "Gümüştekin Bey" in the Turkish TV series Diriliş: Ertuğrul, which is based on Gazi Gümüshtigin.

Preceded by Danishmend Gazi	Melik of the Danishmends; 1084-1104	Succeeded by Emir Gazi
