= Mesud I =

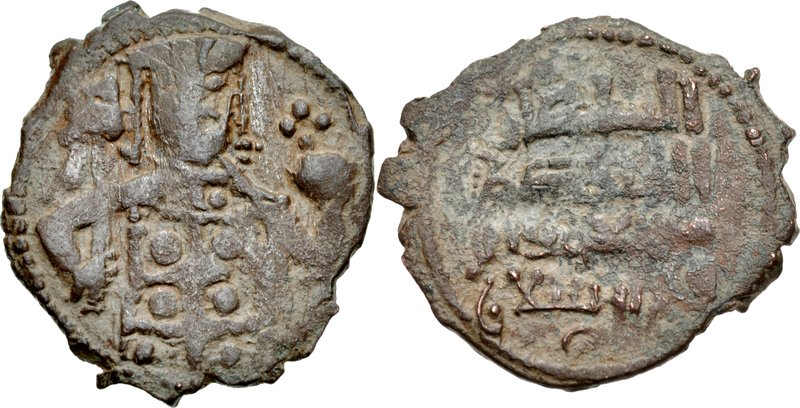
- Coinage of Rukn al-Din Mas'ud I. AH 510-551 (AD 1116-1156). Obverse: Half-length facing bust of Byzantine emperor.

Seljuq Sultan of Rum
- Reign: 1116–1156
- Coronation: 1116, Konya
- Predecessor: Malik Shah
- Successor: Kilij Arslan II
- Born: 1095
- Died: 1156 (aged 60–61)
- Issue: Kilij Arslan II
Names
- Rukn al-Dīn Mas'ūd
- House: House of Seljuq
- Father: Kilij Arslan I
- Religion: Islam
- Military career
- Conflicts: Expedition to Iconium (1146); Second Crusade; Battle of Dorylaeum (1147); Battle of Mount Cadmus; Fall of Turbessel; Campaign of Danishmendids; Campaign of Cilicia; Struggle with Malik Shah of Rum; Capture of Konya

Rukn al-Dīn Mesud ibn Kilij Arslan or Mesud I (Modern Turkish: I. Rükneddin Mesud or Masud (Persian: ركن الدین مسعود) was the sultan of the Sultanate of Rûm from 1116 until his death in 1156.

== Reign ==
Following the defeat and death of his father Kilij Arslan fighting against Ridwan of Aleppo at the Battle of Khabur River in 1107, Mesud was passed over for the throne, in favor of his brother Malik Shah. Following Malik Shah's defeat at the hands of Byzantine Emperor Alexios I Komnenos, at the Battle of Philomelion in 1116, Mesud rebelled. Later in 1116, with the help of his father-in-law, the Danishmend ruler Gümüshtigin, Mesud captured Konya and defeated Malik Shah, blinding and eventually having him murdered. Mesud would later turn on the Danishmends and conquer some of their lands. In 1130, he started construction of the Alâeddin Mosque in Konya, which was later completed in 1221.

In 1146, Mesud successfully fended off a Byzantine attack on his capital and toward the end of his reign, fought against the armies of the Second Crusade, one led by Emperor Conrad III of Germany and the other led by King Louis VII of France. Mesud defeated both of them; the first at the battle of Dorylaeum near modern Eskişehir in 1147 and the second army in Laodicea near modern Denizli in 1148. He invaded the Principality of Antioch in September 1149 and captured Marash.

Emperor Manuel I Komnenos persuaded Mesud I to attack Thoros II and demand his submission to the Sultan's suzerainty. However, the ensuing Seljuk attack, which in fact was provoked by an Armenian raid into Seljuk lands in Cappadocia in the winter of 1154, was routed successfully by Thoros in collaboration with a contingent of the Knights Templar.

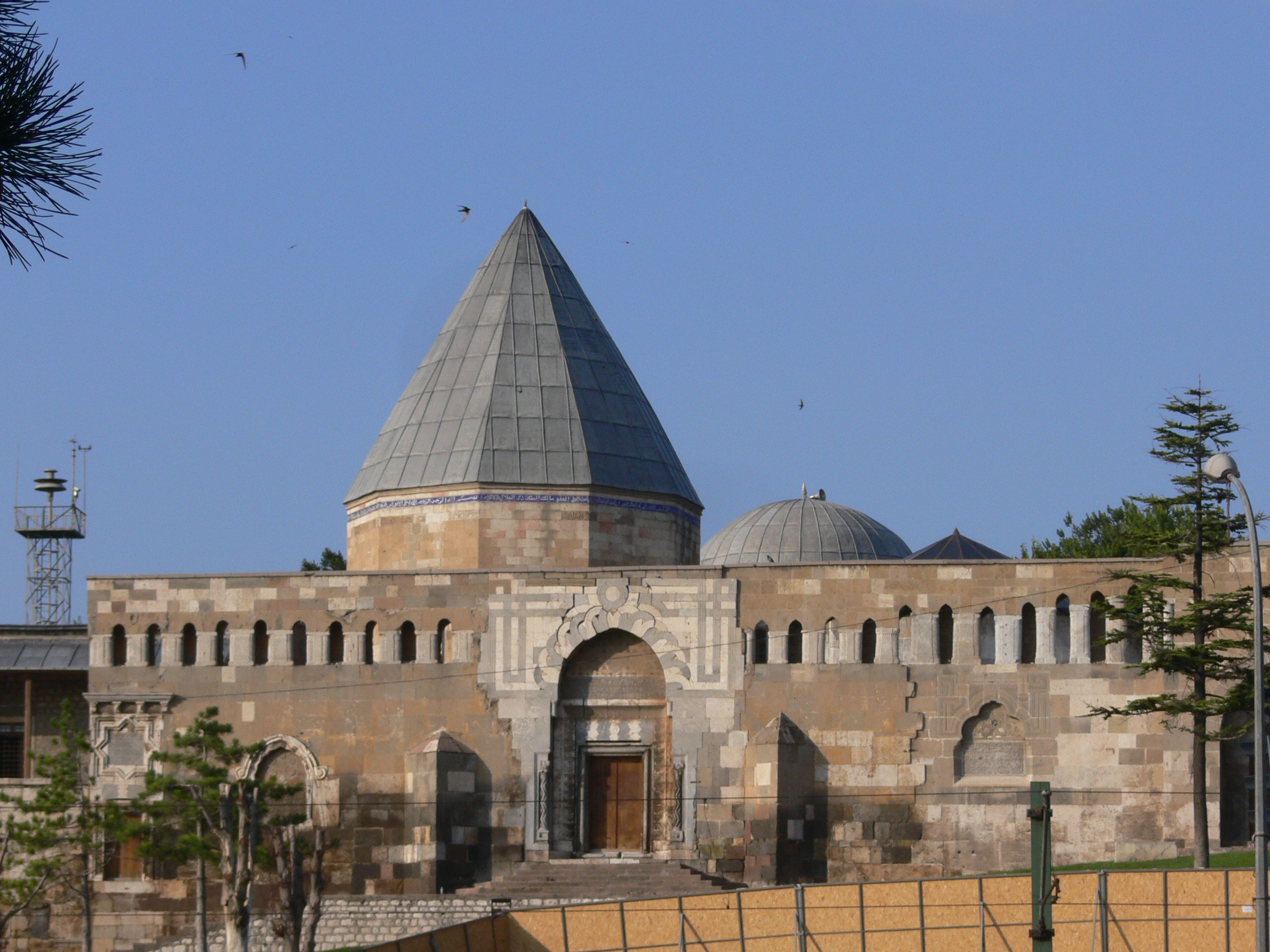
The Alâeddin Mosque in Konya was built during the reign of Mesud I. The building served as the “Mosque of the Throne” for the Seljuq Sultans of Rum and contains the dynastic mausoleum.

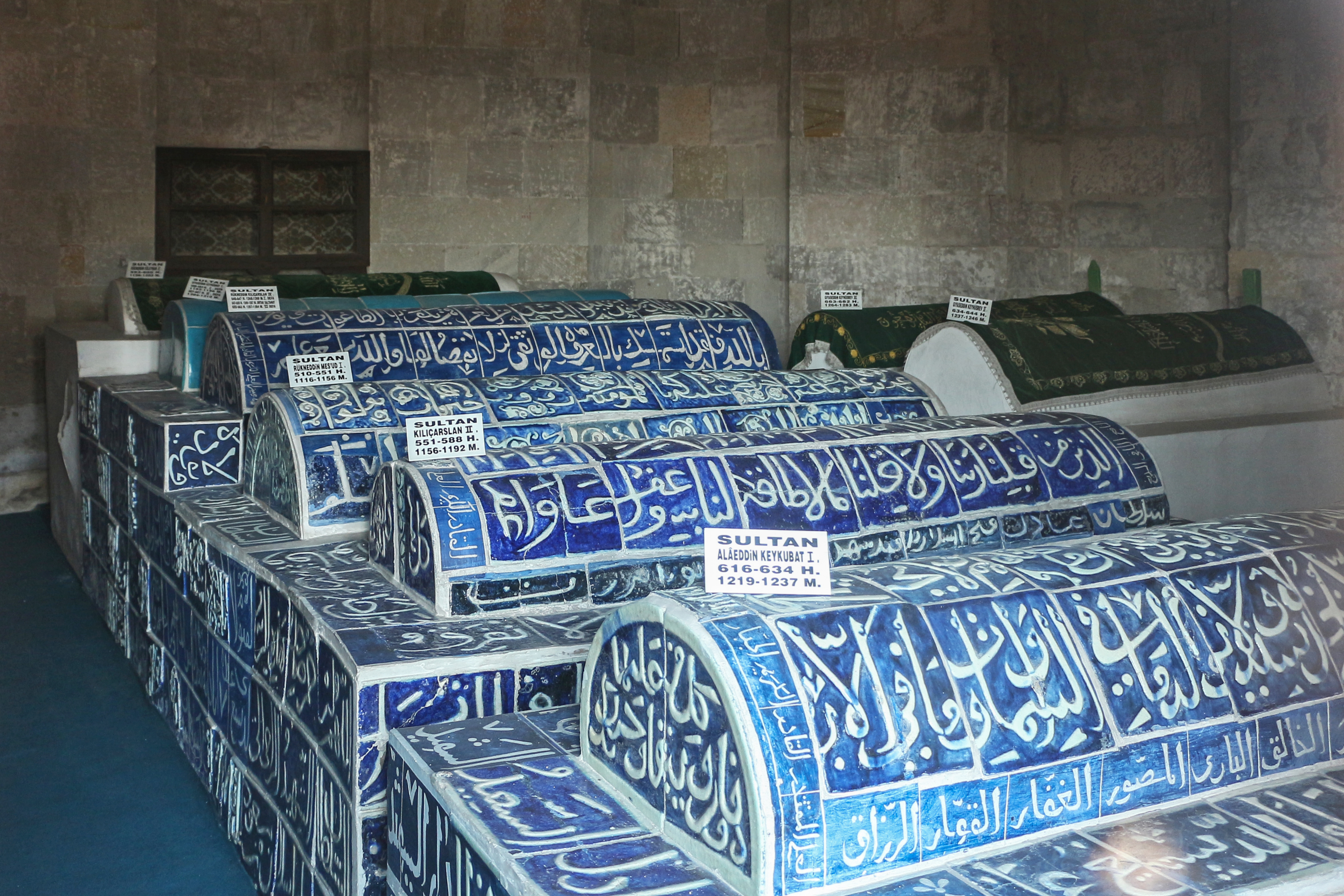
Tomb of Mesud I (third from front)

In the year 603 AE (1154) once again the Byzantine emperor Manuel sought to stoke Masud and he sent him twice the amount of treasure as previously, saying: «Quench the burning of my heart toward the Armenian people, destroy their fortresses, and exterminate them.» So the sultan came to Anazarbus with many troops, but he was unable to accomplish anything. He sent one of his grandees, named Yaqub, to ravage the territory of Antioch. When they had crossed the gate, the Brothers (the Knights Templar), as though sent by God, swooped upon them at that place and slaughtered all of them, including their chief. When those in the sultan’s army heard about this, they were horrified. This was not all, for the wrath of God was visited upon them. Their horses perished from tapax (diarrhea) and they themselves turned to flight, brother not waiting to help brother, nor comrade, comrade. They hamstrung many of the horses and fled on foot through difficult, marshy places, as though they were persecuting themselves. For at that time Thoros was not in his country. Rather, he had gone to Tsets. When he returned and saw what had unfolded everyone thanked God, for they had been defeated without the use of weapons and without a physical battle.

— Smbat Sparapet

When he died, Mesud was succeeded by his son Kilij Arslan II.

Kamero, one of Mesud's daughters married John Tzelepes Komnenos, a member of the royal house of Komnenos who had converted to Islam.

== See also ==
- Battle of Mount Cadmus

== Sources ==
- Brand, Charles M. (1989). "The Turkish Element in Byzantium, Eleventh-Twelfth Centuries". Dumbarton Oaks Papers. 43.
- Ghazarian, Jacob G. (2018). The Armenian Kingdom in Cilicia during the Crusades: The Integration of Cilician Armenians with the Latins (1080–1393). Taylor & Francis. ISBN 9781136124181.
- Miller, Julie A. (1995). "Konya". In Ring, Trudy; Salkin, Robert M.; La Boda, Sharon (eds.). International Dictionary of Historic Places: Southern Europe. Fitzroy Dearborn Publishers. ISBN 9781884964008.
- Nicholson, Robert L. (1973). Joscelyn III and the Fall of the Crusader States, 1134-1199. E.J. Brill. ISBN 978-90-04-03676-5.
- Sicker, Martin (2000). The Islamic World in Ascendancy: From the Arab conquests to the siege of Vienna. Praeger Publishers. ISBN 9780313001116.
- Turan, Osman (1970). "Anatolia in the Period of the Seljuks and the Beyliks". In Holt, Peter Malcolm; Lambton, Ann K. S.; Lewis, Bernard (eds.). The Cambridge History of Islam. Vol. 1A. Cambridge University Press. ISBN 9780521219464.

Preceded by Malik Shah	Sultan of Rûm; 1116–1156	Succeeded by Kilij Arslan II
