= Godfrey of Esch =

Lord of Esch and crusader, son of Fredelon of Esch

Godfrey (Geoffrey) (Filius Fredelonis, unus de collateralibus ducis Godefridi) (died after 1098), Lord of Esch and crusader, son of Fredelon of Esch. Godfrey was brother to Henry of Esch. His family held the castle of Esch-sur-Sûre in the Ardennes. He and his brother were vassals of Henry III, Count of Luxembourg, and his brother and successor William. His stepmother was Ermengarde, Countess of Clermont, widow of Gozelon, Count of Montaigu.

Godfrey and his brother took the cross in 1096 and were among many leading knights from Walloon and the Lotharingian territories that joined the army of Godfrey of Bouillon in the First Crusade. These included Godfrey's brothers and their cousin Baldwin of Le Bourg, Baldwin II of Hainaut, Rainald of Toul, Giselbert of Clermont, Warner of Grez, Baldwin of Stavelot, Peter of Stenay, Dodo of Cons, and Conon of Montaigu and his sons and heirs Gozelo II and Lambert.

Godfrey was chosen to negotiate the passage of the crusading army through Hungary. The first three armies passing through Hungary resulting in calamitous slaughters, and the king Coloman the Learned was determined to not repeat these disasters. In September 1096, Godfrey successfully negotiated the passage of the army through Hungary, but the price was high. The family of Godfrey of Bouillon was required to be held hostage until the army had passed. The incident apparently greatly enhanced the standing of Coloman in the eyes of European royalty.

As Henry and Baldwin hurried to Constantinople in search of booty, Godfrey and the others would arrive shortly thereafter. Emperor Alexios I Komnenos and Godfrey differed on the goals of the crusade, and Godfrey was unwilling to agree to the emperor's demands prior to the main force of Crusaders that would shortly arrive in the Holy Land. Godfrey sent his cousin Baldwin of Le Bourg, Conon of Montaigu, and Godfrey (of Esch) to the palace to meet with Alexios, but with no resolution of the conflict.

A charter dated February 1098 by Emperor Henry IV relating to the abbey of Nivelles indicates that both Godfrey and his brother Henry had returned from the crusades. There is no further reference to them in the histories. It is uncertain whether Godfrey had any children, although Godfrey II, Count of Esch, could have been his son.

== Sources ==
- Murray, Alan V., "The Army of Godfrey of Bouillon, 1096–1099: Structure and Dynamics of a Contingent on the First Crusade" (PDF). Revue belge de philologie et d'histoire 70 (2), 1992
- Runciman, Steven, A History of the Crusades, Volume I: The First Crusade and the Foundation of the Kingdom of Jerusalem, Cambridge University Press, Cambridge, 1951
- Riley-Smith, The First Crusaders, 1095-1131, Cambridge University Press, Cambridge, 1997
