= Conon, Count of Montaigu =

Lotharingian nobleman and military leader

Conon (also Cono or Cuno; (Note: This name is a diminutive form of Conrad (German Konrad > Kuno) and is unrelated to the Breton name Conan, although both may be spelled "Conon".) died 1 May 1106) was a Lotharingian nobleman and military leader of the First Crusade. He was one of the most prominent lords of the Ardennes, being the count of Montaigu, lord of Rochefort and advocate (defender) of the city of Dinant from 1064. (Note: Lotharingia, part of the Holy Roman Empire at the time, was divided into two duchies, Upper Lorraine and Lower Lorraine. Conon's lands lay in Lower Lorraine, in what is now Belgium.) He was also one of the most important vassals of the bishop of Liège. His chief seat was the castle of Montaigu.

== Family ==
Conon was the eldest son of Gozelo, count of Montaigu, and his wife Ermentrude of Harenzey. His younger brother Henry was the dean of the Cathedral of Saint Lambert in Liège. Conon's only known wife was named Ida. According to the medieval English historian Orderic Vitalis, Conon married a sister of Godfrey of Bouillon. Godfrey is not otherwise known to have had a sister, but his mother was Ida of Lorraine. In contrast, the Cantatorium, the chronicle of the abbey of Saint-Hubert, records that Conon's wife was the daughter of Lambert the Old, a nobleman from the region of Liège who was buried at Saint-Hubert. Conon and his wife Ida had four children, in order of birth:

- Gozelo (died 1097), who died in the First Crusade
- Lambert (died 1140 or after), his father's successor as count of Montaigu
- Henry (died 1128 or after), archdeacon and provost of Fosses from 1111
- Theobald (died after 1086)

The name of his father and eldest son suggests that Conon was related in some way to the Ardennes-Verdun dynasty, the family of Godfrey of Bouillon's mother. (Note: Gozelo is a diminutive of Godfrey. They were Leitnamen ("lead names") among the Ardennes-Verdun dynasty, who treated them as two distinct names.)

== Succession ==
Conon first appears in 1055 alongside his father and his brother Rudolf confirming the diploma by which the Emperor Henry III transferred the church of Longlier to the abbey of Florennes. In 1064, Conon, his father and his brother witnessed the confirmation of the foundation of the priory at Longlier by Duke Frederick of Lower Lorraine.

The Cantatorium of Saint-Hubert, in recording Conon's father's death in 1064, only accords him the title "count of Behogne" and not of Montaigu. It has been hypothesised that the elder Gozelo had already ceded the castle of Montaigu to his eldest son and moved his residence to the more secure and central village of Behogne, where he proceeded to erect the castle later known as Rochefort. (Note: Behogne (Bohania) is today a quarter of Rochefort.) Whatever the case, Conon inherited his father's lands and titles after his death. A document dated 1 January 1071 in the archives of the abbey of Waulsort records Conon as count under Duke Godfrey IV and under the Emperor Henry IV.

== Lotharingian politics ==
On 30 August and 1 September 1080, an important regional assembly was held to decide on the construction of a stone bridge over the Meuse at Dinant. As suzerain over the city, Bishop Henry of Liège was present, as was Conon, the lay advocate of the city, and Count Albert III of Namur, who retained some rights in Dinant, including a right to tribute. Isaac, the mayor of Dinant, and Frewald, its provost, were also in attendance. It was necessary to get the permission of Godescalc, abbot of Waulsort, for the construction of a bridge, since it would obviate the need for the ferry, which was operated by the abbey and provided substantial revenues. A deal was struck, and the bridge was built.

Conon was among the barons under the spiritual jurisdiction of the bishop of Liège who assented to the Truce of God (treuga Dei) being proclaimed throughout the diocese in 1082. This was the first time the truce had been proclaimed in the Holy Roman Empire. (Note: The original conflict that had propelled the bishop to act was the little war between the neighbouring towns of Sint-Truiden and Brustem, each backed by allies.) In 1086, Conon also subscribed to the bishop's charter establishing a permanent tribunal to try high crimes such as abduction, rape, assault, robbery, arson and murder. The 15th-century chronicler Jean de Stavelot, records that Dodon, the count of Laroche, refused to accede to the charter and besieged by the forces of the assenting nobles. After a siege of seven months, the besiegers gave in and recognised the exemption of Laroche from the jurisdiction of the tribunal.

In 1087, Conon was present in Aachen when the Emperor Henry IV took the collegiate church of Saint Servatius in Maastricht under his protection, confirmed its liberties and exempted its provostship from any other ecclesiastical jurisdiction.

When Bishop Henry died in 1091, he was succeeded by Otbert, a man devoted to the cause of Henry IV and the Antipope Clement III against the legitimate pope, Urban II. When Otbert attempted to depose Theoderic II, abbot of Saint-Hubert, and appoint in his place Hildebrand, a monk of Lobbes, Conon led the noble opposition. The legal proceedings as recorded in the Cantatorium present Conon as a confident and unyielding lover of justice.

In 1095, Conon assisted at a judicial duel between champions representing the inhabitants of Olne and the abbey of Stavelot. The men of Olne were renting land at Fraipont from the abbey, and disagreements between the parties had led to violence. Giselbert, champion of the abbey, won the duel.

== Crusade ==
In 1083, Bishop Henry of Liège gave Conon the advocacy of the domain of Nandrin, a possession of the church of Saint Paul of Liège in the county of Montaigu, because it had repeatedly suffered the depredations (Note: This would have been the bishop's view; the count of Clermont probably saw himself as collecting tolls he was legally owed from riverine traffic.) of the neighbouring count of Clermont. In 1095, Henry's successor, Bishop Otbert, purchased the county of Clermont from its count, Giselbert, and enfeoffed Conon's son Lambert with it.

Conon participated in the First Crusade, along with his sons Gozelo and Lambert and their erstwhile enemies Giselbert of Clermont and his ally Fredelo. They travelled with the army of Godfrey of Bouillon. Conon's lord, Bishop Otbert, had purchased the castle of Bouillon from Godfrey to finance the latter's crusade. Thirty-four marks for the purchase came from the poor church of Saintes-Marie-et-Perpétue in Dinant. In compensation, Otbert transferred some rents and tolls to the church and apparently persuaded Conon to transfer one of his rents as well.

The army of Godfrey of Bouillon, with Conon's smaller retinue, was one of the first to arrive in Constantinople. There the Byzantine emperor Alexios I and Godfrey had different views of the goals of the crusade, and Godfrey was unwilling to commit to the emperor's demands until the remaining crusaders arrived. He camped outside the city, while Conon, Baldwin of Le Bourg and Godfrey of Esch (Fredelo's son) met with Alexios in the palace. Conon and Baldwin subsequently received Alexios' representative, John Komnenos of Dyrrhachium. Conon's son Gozelo died in the East, but he and his son Lambert continued on to Jerusalem, after they considered their vows fulfilled and returned to Montaigu before the end of the year 1099.

Alberic of Trois-Fontaines and Giles of Orval record the tradition that Conon was returning on a ship with Peter the Hermit and some men of Huy when they encountered a severe storm and vowed to build a church if they survived. The storm immediately subsided, and the promise was kept when Conon and Peter founded the Augustinian canonry of Neufmoustier, dedicated to the Holy Sepulchre and John the Baptist. According to the tradition kept at Neufmoustier, Peter lived there until his death in 1115.
