= Lords of Esch =

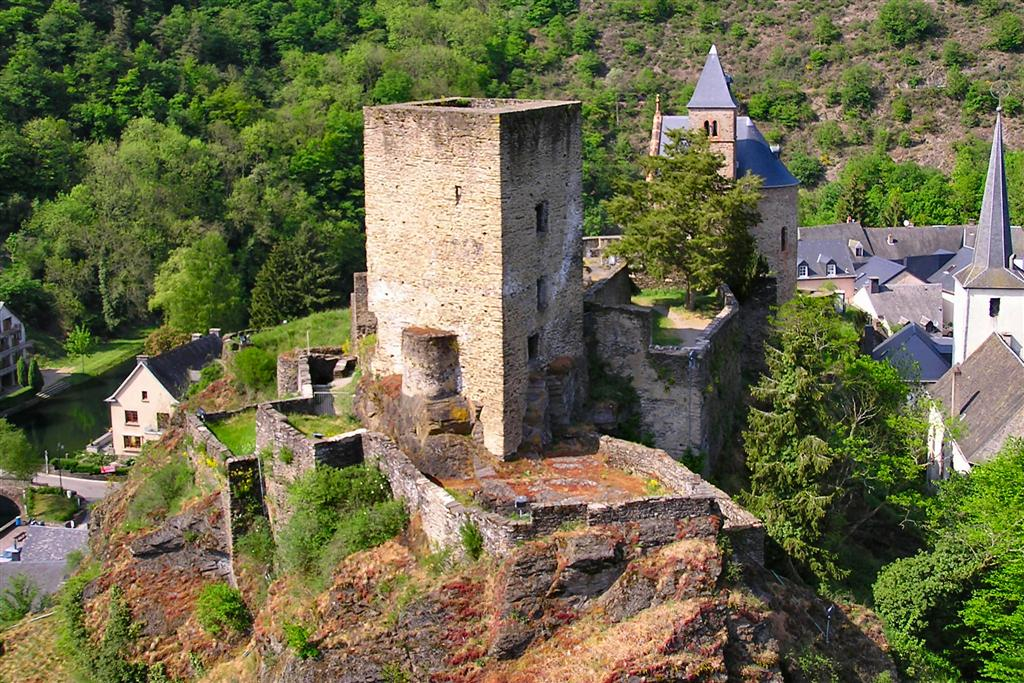
Ruins of the castle of Esch

In the 10th through 13th centuries, the Lords of Esch (French: seigneurs d'Esch) were the holders of the castle of Esch-sur-Sûre in the Ardennes region of Lower Lorraine, then a part of the Holy Roman Empire.

== Fredelon ==
Fredelon (also spelled Fredelo and Frithelo; died between 1083 and 1085), of unknown parentage, was the patriarch of the house of Esch, which produced several notable knights in service of the Crusades. Fredelon's family were likely vassals of Henry III, Count of Luxembourg, and his brother and successor William.

Fredelon was avoué (or vogt) of the abbeys of Malmedy and Echternach, and also known to be their despoiler. Fredelon was an accomplice to Giselbert, Count of Clermont, in a variety of nefarious enterprises. Fredelon and Giselbert terrorized the region near Nandrin preventing inhabitants from performing even the basic of tasks. Henri de Verdun, Bishop of Liège, gave this land to Conon, Count of Montaigu, forcing Fredelon and Giselbert to restore the resultant damage.

Fredelon and Giselbert were the lords of castle Clermont in 1095 and engaged in brigandage, though the pair regarded their activity as the legitimate levying of tolls on river traffic. Otbert, Henri's successor, organized a siege of the castle but was unsuccessful. A 1095 entry in the chronicle of Giles of Orval reveals that Otbert's objective was ultimately accomplished by purchase, resulting in the enfeoffment of the property to his vassal Lambert, Count of Montaigu. Giselbert subsequently joined the First Crusade. It is unclear as to what Fredelon did after his ouster.

== Children of Fredelon ==
Fredelon was married twice. By his first wife, whose name is unknown, he had two sons:

- Henry of Esch (Henricus de Ascha; d. after 1097)
- Godfrey of Esch (ilius Fredelonis, unus de collateralibus duds Godefrid)

Both sons participated in the First Crusade as part of the army of Godfrey of Bouillon.

Fredelon's second wife was Ermengarde, Countess of Clermont, widow of Gozelon, Count of Montaigu. Fredelon and Ermengarde had one son: Giselbert, Count of Esch (d. after 18 March 1131).

It is unclear how Giselbert become the Count of Esch and it is not until two generations later that another Count of Esch appears.

== Later generations ==
Fredelon's son Giselbert married Aelide, of unknown origin, and they had at least one son, Renard (d. after 1157), who was Seigneur de Hermalle-sous-Huy, and had some relationship with Godefroi, Count of Montaigu and Clermont. Renard married a woman named Lietgard, daughter of Robert Richira. They had a son Henri (d. after 1187), also Seigneur de Hermalle-sous-Huy, who witnessed a charter in 1182 regarding a matter involving Conon, Count of Montaigu and Duras.

Fredelon also had a grandson named Godfrey II (Gottfried; d. 1150 or after), Count of Esch, but it is unclear which of Fredelon's sons was his father. Godfrey II married Alix de Grandpré, widow of Godefroi, Count of Durbuy, and they had five children:

- Robert, Abbé de Foigny (d. 25 August 1170)
- Heinrich II
- Friedrich
- Bartholomäus von Esch (d. between 1182 and 1192)
- Ermengarde

Bartholomäus founded the Priory of Ufeldange in 1182, as described in a charter confirmed by Arnold I of Vaucourt, Archbishop of Trier. The name of his wife is unknown, but they had two children:

- Godfrey III von Esch (d. after 1182)
- Heinrich III von Esch (d. before 1220)

Heinrich III had a son, Robert von Esch (d. between 13 October 1262 and January 1266), who married Ermengarde d’Aspremont (d. after 1271). Ermengarde was sister to Jean d’Aspremont who was the Bishop of Verdun from 1217 to 1224 (as John I of Aspremont) and the Bishop of Metz from 1224 to 1238 (as Johann of Aspremont). Ermengarde's parents were Ida of Chiny, daughter of Albert, Count of Chiny, and Gobert V, Lord of Aspremont.

Robert's son, Heinrich IV von Esch, appears to have been married to a member of the House of Salm but the precise relationship there is unclear. Heinrich IV's son, Godfrey d’Esch, was the last member of the House of Esch to appear in historical documents, participating in the Tournament of Chauvency, which was sponsored by Louis V, Count of Chiny. Godfrey was championed by his niece Perrine.

== Sources ==
- Murray, Alan V., "The Army of Godfrey of Bouillon, 1096–1099: Structure and Dynamics of a Contingent on the First Crusade" (PDF), Revue belge de philologie et d'histoire 70 (2), 1992
- Le Long, Nicolas, Histoire Ecclésiastique et Civile du Duché De Luxembourg et Comté de Chiny, Chevalier, 1783 (available on Google Books)
- Bretel, Jacques, Le Tournoi de Chauvency, 1285 (manuscripts: Mons MS 330-215 and Oxford MS Douce 308).
- Esch-sur-Sûre Castle at Visit Luxembourg
