= Army of Godfrey of Bouillon =

Frankish force of the First Crusade (1096–99)

The army of Godfrey of Bouillon, the duke of Lower Lorraine, in response to the call by Pope Urban II to both liberate Jerusalem from Muslim forces and protect the Byzantine Empire from similar attacks. Godfrey and his army, one of several Frankish forces deployed during the First Crusade, was among the first to arrive in Constantinople. The army was unique in that it included among its warriors the first three kings of Jerusalem, although Godfrey preferred the title Defender of the Holy Sepulchre, Advocatus Sancti Sepulchri, as he believed that the true King of Jerusalem was Jesus Christ. This article focuses on the members of the army rather that its exploits which are described in detail in Godfrey's biography as well as numerous sources listed below.

== Family and Household of Godfrey ==
The family and household of Godfrey include the following. Note that Godfrey's older brother Eustace III, Count of Boulogne, may have accompanied his brother but more likely traveled with Robert Curthose’s army.

- Godfrey was definitely accompanied by his younger brother Baldwin (later Baldwin I, King of Jerusalem) and his wife Godevere, daughter of Raoul II of Tosny. Baldwin's secretary Gerard was captured by the soldiers of the Turkmen under Ilghazi and beheaded.
- Fulcher of Chartres, originally with the army of Stephen of Blois, joined Baldwin as chaplin in 1097.
- Members of Godfrey's household that travelled with him included: Ruthard, his butler, Baldric, the seneschal (sent as an emissary to the King of Hungary), Stabelo, the chamberlain (killed in the second battle of Ramia in 1102), Heribrand, Castellan of Bouillon, and his relative Walter of Bouillon. Additional members of the household included chamberlains Adelolf and Gerard, the seneschal Matthew, and Miles of Clermont-sous-Huy.
- Winrich of Flanders, who originally travelled with Robert II of Flanders, became the butler of Godfrey of Bouillon in 1100
- The household also included Wicker Alemannus of Swabia, a ministerialis of the abbey of Fulda who died of fever at Jaffa in 1101.

== Lords of Lower Lotharingia ==
The lords from the areas of Lower Lotharingia that were adjacent to Godfrey's lands included the following:

- Werner, Count of Grez, later a prominent vassal of Godfrey's in Jerusalem
- Godfrey of Esch and his brother Henry, Lord of Esch-sur-Sûre, sons of the despoiler Fredelon of Esch
- Giselbert, Count of Clermont-sur-Meuse, an accomplice of Frdelon of Esch (see above)
- Hugh of Fauquembergues, later Prince of Galilee and Lord of Tiberias
- Gervaise of Bazoches, an officer in the service of Baldwin I, who became Prince of Galilee and Lord of Tiberias
- Franco I of Maasmechelen (died at the siege of Arsuf in 1099) and his brother Sigemar, relatives of Godfrey (precise relationship unknown).
- Conon, Count of Montaigu, and his sons and successors Gozelo II and Lambert (who was also Count of Clermont)
- Baldwin II of Mons, Count of Hainaut (geographically removed but still allied with Godfrey as opposed to Robert II of Flanders). He was accompanied by his vassals Gerard of Avesnes-sur-Helpe (killed in the second battle of Ramla in 1102) and Giselbert of Couvin.

== Lords of Upper Lotharingia ==
A third element of the exercitus of Godfrey were from Upper Lotharingia.

- The duke, Theoderic I, Count of Bar and Montbéliard, was unable to participate in the Crusades due to illness, but was represented by his eldest son Louis, Count of Mousson, and a knight who belonged to Godfrey's household named Ralph of Mouton.
- Dodo of Cons, accompanied by his wife Hadvide, daughter of Arnold I, Count of Chiny (see below)
- Peter of Dampierre-le-Château, Count of Astenois (known as Peter of Stenay) and his brother Rainald III, Count of Toul (reputed to be relatives of Godfrey). They were sons of Frederick I, Count of Astenois, and Gertrude, daughter of Rainald III, Count of Toul.
- Peter and Renauld were accompanied by Louis, Archdeacon of Toul, and six lords from the diocese: Rambert, son of Fraimer of Lironville, Bencelin, Aldo of Fontenoy-sur-Moselle, and Lanfric with his son Olric and brother Hugh.
- Baldwin of Le Bourg (a member of the House of Montlhéry and the third King of Jerusalem). He was accompanied by his squire (name unrecorded) who executed a Turkish captive, and by a vassal known as Hugh of Bourcq.
- Héribrand of Bouillon, married to a sister of Baldwin of Le Bourg
- Adalbero of Luxembourg, son of Conrad I, Count of Luxembourg. Archdeacon of Metz. After the capture of Antioch, Adelbero and a companion were captured outside the gates by the Turks and beheaded, their heads then catapulted into the city.

== Other Lesser Known Participants ==
Very little is known about the following participants in the army. Lords and nobles accompanying Godfrey:

- Arnulf II, Lord of Oudenaarde, died in the fighting near Ascalon, and was buried at the abbey of Jehosaphat
- Gotmann of Brussels.

The following knights also were in the army:

- Fulcher (Fulbert) of Bouillon (captured and beheaded during the siege of Antioch) and his wife Emeline who was abducted by the Turks
- Drogo of Nesle, formerly of the army of Emicho, Count of Flonheim
- Robert of Anzi, formerly of the army of Bohemond of Taranto
- Reinhard of Hemmersbach, died of plague during the siege of Antioch and was buried at the Church of St. Peter at Antioch.

The following also accompanied Godfrey although their role is not known:

- Airard
- Gunter, a member of Godfrey's household in Jerusalem
- Lambert
- Philip of Bouillon.

== Nobles who chose not to Participate ==
For a variety of reasons, primarily political, several notable lords and counts chose not to join, either personally or via family, in Godfrey's army. These included:

- Albert of Namur
- Arnold I, Count of Chiny. Arnold's descendant Louis V, Count of Chiny, apparently fabricated the story that Arnold sent his sons Otto and Louis on the Crusade with Godfrey to gain favor with the royalty participating in the Tournament of Chauvency. In fact, his daughter Hadvide was the only participant from the family.
- Henry of Arlon and Limburg
- The three heirs of Theoderic Flamens: Gerard of Geldern, Henry of Kriekenbeek, and Gosuin of Heinsberg
- Henry of Leuven
- The Count of Holland, apparently Floris II, Count of Holland
- The Count of Luxembourg, apparently William, Count of Luxembourg.

== Major Battles of the Army ==
After some difficulties in Hungary, the army of Godfrey engaged in the following major battles:

- Siege of Nicaea, 1097
- Battle of Dorylaeum, 1097
- Siege of Antioch, 1097–1098
- Siege of Jerusalem, 1099.

After the capture of Jerusalem, Raymond of Toulouse refused the crown, and Godfrey became ruler of Jerusalem, sometimes referred to as Advocatus Sancti Sepulchri.

== Sources ==
- Murray, Alan V., The Army of Godfrey of Bouillon, 1096–1099: Structure and Dynamics of a Contingent on the First Crusade (available in PDF), Revue belge de philologie et d'histoire, 70 (2): 301–29. 1992
- Murray, Alan V. (2000). The Crusader Kingdom of Jerusalem: A Dynastic History 1099-1125. Occasional Publications UPR. ISBN 9781900934039.
- A Database of Crusaders to the Holy Land, 1095-1149 (on-line)
- Runciman, Steven, A History of the Crusades, Volume One: The First Crusade and the Foundation of the Kingdom of Jerusalem, Cambridge University Press, London, 1951
- Riley-Smith, Jonathan, The First Crusaders, 1095-1131, Cambridge University Press, London, 1997
- Bury, J. B., Editor, The Cambridge Medieval History, Volume III: Germany and the Western Empire, Cambridge University Press, London, 1922
- Arlette Laret-Kayser, Entre Bar et Luxembourg : Le Comté de Chiny des Origines à 1300, Bruxelles (éditions du Crédit Communal, Collection Histoire, série in-8°, n° 72), 1986
