= Henry of Esch =

Henry (Henricus de Ascha) (died after 1098), lord (or, in some accounts, count) of Esch, son of Fredelon of Esch. Henry was brother to Godfrey of Esch, and his family held the castle of Esch-sur-Sûre in the Ardennes. He and his brother were vassals of Henry III, Count of Luxembourg, and his brother and successor William. His step-mother was Ermengarde, Countess of Clermont, widow of Gozelon, Count of Montaigu, the founder of the family of counts of Montaigu.

Henry joined the First Crusade in the army of Godfrey of Bouillon, leaving for Jerusalem in August 1096. He accompanied Robert, Count of Flanders. to the Holy Land. In one account, he and Baldwin II, Count of Hainaut, were sent by Godfrey to secure the release of Hugh the Great who had been imprisoned by the Emperor Alexios. Runciman tells a different story. Rumors had it that arriving crusaders had been bestowed with bountiful gifts, and that Baldwin and Henry hastened to Constantinople to claim their share before the others could arrive, only to find the rumors false and Hugh in chains. It is reported that Godfrey was “somewhat disquieted” but it is not clear that his displeasure was with Hugh’s capture or with the haste of the departure of Baldwin and Henry.

Henry and Hartmann, Count of Dillingen-Kyburg (Heinricus de Ascha, Hartmannus comes, unus de majoribus Alemanniæ) constructed a siege engine known as the fox (vulpem) which collapsed when rushed into action at the siege of Nicaea in 1097.

Henry was among a group of knights who guarded Adhémar de Monteil, Bishop of Puy-en-Valay, in the mountains above the port of St. Simeon after they discovered what they mistakenly believed to be the Holy Lance. The other knights guarding the bishop included Peter of Dampierre-le-Château, Count of Astenois, his nephew Reinhard III, Count of Toul, Reinhard of Hamersbach, Warner of Grez, and Walter, avoué of St. Valery-sur-Somme and viscount of Domart-en-Ponthieu (husband of Hodierna, daughter of Guy I of Montlhéry). The monk Peter Bartholomew, discoverer of the lance, was also presumably present. Peter underwent an ordeal by fire to verify his claim, but did not survive his test of faith.

Albert of Aix recorded the death of Henry in the village of Turbaisel during an epidemic. It is not known for certain whether Henry had any children, although Godfrey II, Count of Esch, could have been his son as his parentage has not been verified.

== Sources ==
- Murray, Alan V., "The Army of Godfrey of Bouillon, 1096–1099: Structure and Dynamics of a Contingent on the First Crusade" (PDF), Revue belge de philologie et d'histoire 70 (2), 1992
- Runciman, Steven, A History of the Crusades, Volume I: The First Crusade and the Foundation of the Kingdom of Jerusalem, Cambridge University Press, Cambridge, 1951
- Riley-Smith, Jonathan, The First Crusaders, 1095-1131, Cambridge University Press, Cambridge, 1997
- Adhémar de Monteil, an article in the Encyclopædia Britannica, 11th Edition, Cambridge University Press, 1910-1911
- Edgington, Susan, Albert of Aachen: Historia Ierosolimitana, History of the Journey to Jerusalem, Clarendon Press, 2007 (available on Google Books)
