= Jordan IV of L'Isle-Jourdain =

Jordan IV (died 1288) was the Lord of L'Isle-Jourdain and a vassal of Alfonso of Poitou. He was a crusader during the Italian crusades of Guelph against Ghibelline. His son-in-law was Aimery IV of Narbonne, who led the armies of Florence and Anjou in the Battle of Campaldino in 1289 and his brother was the provost of Toulouse.

Sometime before his activities in Italy Jordan (Jourdan in contemporary Occitan) participated in a torneyamen, a poetical tournament, with Guiraut Riquier, Raimon Izarn, and Paulet de Marseilla.

In 1266, after drawing up a will, he brought a contingent of knights and crossbowmen to Italy with him in support of Charles of Anjou. He was praised by Pope Clement IV and enfeoffed in the Principate and Calabria by Charles, but he soon returned to Gascony. Charles warned him to return or suffer his fiefs to be confiscated and titles revoked, but he lingered until October 1282, when he returned with a new band of soldiers.

In 1285, he joined Philip III of France on the Aragonese Crusade. He died in 1288.

Jordan IV is one of the very few Gascon lords explicitly named in a torneyamen preserved in the chansonnier tradition (ms. C, Biblioteca Estense, Modena). The partimen “En Jorda, eu voil saber” is exchanged between Guiraut Riquier, Raimon Izarn de Valcabrère, Paulet de Marselha, and “En Jorda” (explicitly identified as Jourdain d’Isle-Jourdain by the rubric). The debate, dated stylistically to the early 1260s, concerns the relative merits of generous versus avaricious lords and is the only known instance of a lord of L’Isle-Jourdain participating directly in troubadour composition.

His first wife was Faydide, heiress of Odo, Lord of Casaubon. His second wife was Vacquerie, daughter of Adhémar, Lord of Monteil. From his first marriage he had:

- Jordan V, his successor
- Indie, married Bertrand, Lord of Caumont
- Margaret, married Guy of Comminges

From his second marriage he had:

- Bertrand, Lord of Mauvesin, Montagnac, Corbonne, Saint-Paul, Pibrac, Ausun, and Lombières
- Joan, married the aforementioned Aimery
- Thiburge, Lady of Pribac, married Gauthier du Fossé, Lord of Bramenac, and then Bernard IV of Astarac
- Gaucerande, married Stephen Colonna

The Gascon lordships passed undivided to his eldest son Jordan V. The Italian fiefs granted by Charles of Anjou had already been confiscated in 1283 and were never recovered by the family. The cadet branch founded by Bertrand of Mauvezin flourished in the 14th century and retained significant holdings in the Toulousain and Armagnac until the early 16th century.

== Sources ==
- Durrieu, Paul. Les Gascons en Italie. Auch, 1885.
- Housley, Norman. The Italian Crusades: The Papal-Angevin Alliance and the Crusades Against Christian Lay Powers, 1254-1343. Oxford University Press: 1982.
- Betti, Maria Pia. "Le tenzoni del trovatore Guiraut Riquier." Studi mediolatini e volgari, 44 (1998), 7–193. Available at Rialto.
