= County of Huy =

Medieval county

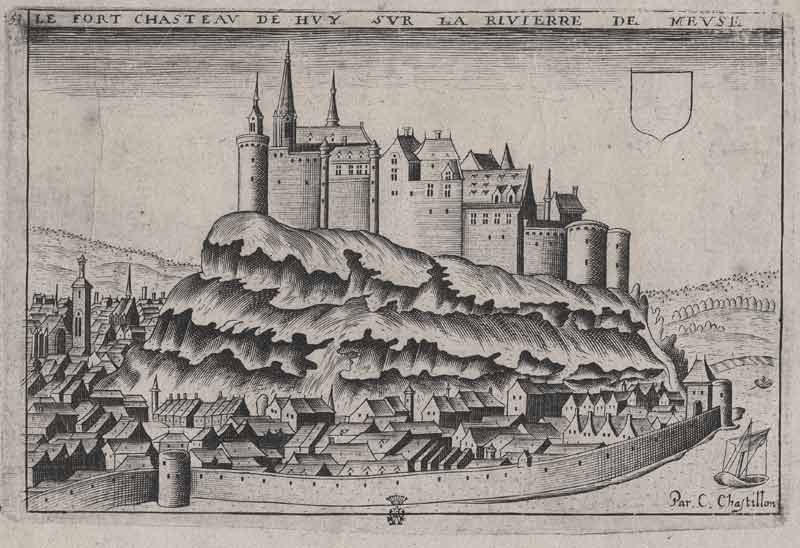
The castle-citadel of Huy, originally constructed in the 9th century, as it was c. 1600. It was destroyed in 1715. The current citadel is a wholly different building on the same site.

The County of Huy (Latin comitatus Hoiensis) was a comital jurisdiction of Lotharingia during the early Middle Ages, centred on the town of Huy and its citadel overlooking the Meuse.

The county probably originated in the late ninth century as a division of the County of Hesbaye. It was probably a new creation, not corresponding to any ancient division. In 985, it was granted to the diocese of Liège, which marks the point when the bishop became a prince of the Holy Roman Empire. In the eleventh century, the bishops appointed counts to administer it on their behalf until, in 1066, they granted the town of Huy self-government.

== Extent ==
The county lay on both sides of the Meuse, but more to the north than the south. It therefore extended into two ancient pagi (districts): the Hesbaye and the Condroz. Besides Huy, it contained the villages of Les Arches, Braives, Faulx, Fraiture, Grand-Rosière, Havelange, Jemeppe, Jeneffe, Leignon, Ocquier, Seraing, Tourinne, Vaux-et-Borset and Vyle-et-Tharoul. It also contained the forest of bois d'Arche below Haltinne. In the north it extended nearly to the villages of Jodoigne and Waremme; in the south as far as Modave.

It bordered upon the counties of Avernas, Brugeron, a reduced Hesbaye, Moha and Namur. It was probably originally a division of the old pagus of Hesbaye, whose lords expanded their jurisdiction, encroaching on neighbouring pagi. A manuscript of the abbey of Orval attributes its foundation to Charlemagne, but this is a legend. There is some correspondence between lands mentioned in the will of Duke Eberhard of Friuli in 866 and the later county of Huy, "the implication being that [the county] had once been governed by Eberhard".

== Lay county ==
Prior to 862, Huy was only ever described as a vicus, larger than a village but smaller than a city. It had a market by 743, when King Childeric III exempted some monks from the market toll (toloneum). In 862, Huy was described as a port on the Meuse when King Lothair II gave the double monastery of Stavelot-Malmedy the right to some of its revenues. During the reign of Ethelred II (978–1016), its traders were present in London. The port was upgraded to a castrum with the construction of a fortress by 890. It is unclear when exactly it was constituted the seat of a county, but it most likely occurred after 870, when there is evidence that the Hesbaye was divided into four counties. Numerous documents of the tenth and eleventh centuries describe locations as being in the district of Hesbaye in the county of Huy. The first identified count is the mysterious saint Mengold, killed in 892 and possibly a wholly legendary figure. According to the hagiographical Vita Meingoldi comitis (Life of Count Mengold), he was granted the county by the Emperor Arnulf.

The documentation for the lay counts of Huy is sparse. Erenfrid, who held several counties, became the advocate of Stavelot by 943 and count of Huy shortly after. He was replaced as advocate in 965, but possibly as count of Huy as early as 964, when a certain Folcuin is first mentioned in documents, although he was not certainly count of Huy before 975. The relationships between the counts of Huy and how the countship may have been passed along by hereditary right have been studied by Donald C. Jackman.

At some point during the reign of Otto I (c. 980), the bishop of Liège was granted the regalian rights of collecting the market tolls and minting coin. Shortly after 975, Ansfrid, the standard-bearer of King Otto I of Germany, was rewarded by Otto II with the county of Huy. His reputation as a count is provided by the chronicler Alpert of Metz, who states that he "investigated righteous legal decisions and spent so much time reading that he was mocked by some foolish people for living the life of a monk." He later entered the church, becoming bishop of Utrecht in 995 and dying in 1010.

== Episcopal county ==
On 7 July 985, the possessions and jurisdiction of the county of Huy were transferred from the retiring Ansfrid to the diocese of Liège under bishop Notker. This grant is the beginning of the secular authority of the bishops of Liège and the county of Huy was thus the kernel of the prince-bishopric. In 1008, King Henry II augmented the grant with the royal forest in the county, which had been retained by the fisc in 985.

The fortress of Huy became the chief refuge of the bishops of Liège. Notker even considered moving the seat of his diocese there. The story that Count Lambert of Leuven challenged Notker's right to the county and fought a war with Liège, in which the bishop ravaged the pagus of Brabant is a late medieval invention from Jean d'Outremeuse's Ly Myreur des Histors, which contains many false stories about the counts of Huy.

In the eleventh century, the bishops seem to have appointed lay counts to act on their behalf, a power specifically granted them in 985. The first episcopal count was probably Herman, count of Ename, who retired to a monastery in 1025 and died in 1029. On 19 April 1028, a charter of the Emperor Conrad II indicates that Gozelo of Behogne was governing the county, presumably under the suzerainty of the bishop. Although Gozelo also held other counties, he resided at the castle of Huy or at Rochefort in the county of Huy. When Gozelo died in 1064, the county seems to have been divided between his sons. Conon, the eldest, received a portion that included Vaux-et-Borset as his hereditatis portio (hereditary portion).

The citizens of Huy, by this time enriched through trade, organized themselves as a commune. They were enfranchised by Bishop Theoduin in 1066, receiving several privileges regarding military obligations and castle-guard. This indicates that the county of Huy had not passed entirely to Gozelo's heirs. Unlike his father, Conon resided not in Huy but in Montaigu.

The episcopal county of Huy expanded southwards in the eleventh century into the pagus of the Famenne (e.g., Wiesme) and the Ardennes (e.g., Smuid). Power over its outlying districts, however, was gradually lost to the counts of Namur. The county of Huy continued as an administrative division of the lands of the bishop of Liège until the end of the eleventh century.

== List of counts ==
The dates given are the first and last known dates of their countships and not necessarily the actual beginning and end. The Belgian historian Léon Vanderkindere identified Count Erenfrid with Ansfrid the Elder, the uncle of the future Count Ansfrid. This identification, however, appears unlikely.

- c. 892 Mengold (possibly)
- 943–958/9 Erenfrid
- 963–975 Folcuin
- 975–985 Ansfrid
- 1013–1025 Herman
- 1028–1064 Gozelo
- 1064–1066 Conon (possibly)
