= Arnold I of Chiny =

Arnold I (died 16 April 1106), Count of Chiny, son of Louis II, Count of Chiny, and his wife Sophie. He succeeded his father as Count before 1066.

Arnold is best known for his many clashes with the authorities. The only known positive action of his was the founding of the Abbey of Orval with Conrad I, Count of Luxembourg. In addition he began other religious institutions, apparently as atonement for his many crimes. He had many run-ins with the clergy, particularly with Henry, Bishop of Liège, a relative of Godfrey the Bearded, no doubt due to the murder of his grandfather by Godfrey’s father. There were also issues with Henry's successor Otbert.

A convenient story is that Arnold regularly confronted Godfrey’s grandson Count Godfrey of Bouillon, a leader of the First Crusade and nephew of Countess Mathilda of Tuscany, but that they eventually became friends. Because of this newly-found friendship, he allegedly entrusted Godfrey with his sons Otto and Louis to take part in the crusade. The reality is that this is likely a story concocted by Count Louis V, much like the rest of his version of the history of Chiny (see the discussion in the Counts of Chiny), to enhance his standing at the Tournament of Chauvency in 1285, which included such royalty as Rudolf I, King of Germany.

It is clear that Otto and Louis never actually joined the crusade, as their names are not listed among the participants in the Holy quest. The reality of the situation appears that Godfrey's army included relatively few of the major nobles of the duchy, especially those of comital rank. The nobles of Lower Lotharingia were not all vassals of the Duke (and later Defender of the Holy Sepulchre) and felt no obligation to follow him, despite the seriousness of the taking of the cross. Notable absentees were Arnold, Albert III of Namur and Henry of Arlon and Limburg. These were all part of the coalition that had waged war on Godfrey and his principal allies Henry of Verdun and his successor Otbert, Prince-Bishops of Liège. There is some uncertainty as to his sons' whereabouts during the crusade, but upon their return, Otto, who became the next Count of Chiny, found Orval falling in ruins. The Calabrian monks left in 1108, and the Cistercians revived Orval with Otto's help.

Apparently unable to abide by normal legal traditions, Arnold attempted to capture Richilde, Countess of Hainaut, widow of Baldwin VI the Good, Count of Flanders, and her son Baldwin II, Count of Hainaut. Like most of his ventures, he failed in this. In 1082, Richilde and her son went on a pilgrimage to Rome, but on her return in 1084, she learned as she approached Chiny that Arnold was planning to kidnap her. She escaped by taking refuge in Benedictine Abbey of Amdain, in the present-day Saint Hubert.

He married Adélaïs (Adelaide), daughter of Hilduin IV, Count of Montdidier, Roucy and Ramerupt, and Alix de Roucy. They had six children:

- Otto II, Count of Chiny
- Louis, founder of the priory of Saint-Valpurge at Chiny
- Halide (Hadvide, Hadwida), married to Dodo of Cons (Dudo of Konz-Saarburg), who took the cross and became a Crusader in the army of Godfrey of Bouillon in 1096. He was one of two sons of Adelon de Cons.
- Clemence, married to Hugel de Waha, Châtelain de Mirwart, who was son of Hériman de Duras, who in turn was son of Otto I, Count of Duras, and grandson to Giselbert I, Count of Duras.
- Beatrix, mother of Arnulf, Archdeacon of Trier.
- Unnamed daughter, mother to Arnoul and Conon.

Arnold's second wife was Ermengarde (d. 1081), a union for which no children are recorded. Arnold and his third wife Agnes had one child:

- Adelbero III of Chiny, Bishop of Verdun (1131-1156)

Upon his death, Arnold’s son Otto assumed the title of Count of Chiny.

== Sources ==
- Guenée, Bernard (May–June 1978). "Les généalogies entre l'histoire et la politique: la fierté d'être Capétien, en France, au Moyen Age". Annales: Histoire, Sciences Sociales (3).
- Laret-Kayser, Arlette, Entre Bar et Luxembourg : Le Comté de Chiny des Origines à 1300, Bruxelles (éditions du Crédit Communal, Collection Histoire, série in-8°, n° 72), 1986
- Murray, Alan V., "The Army of Godfrey of Bouillon, 1096–1099: Structure and Dynamics of a Contingent on the First Crusade" (PDF), Revue belge de philologie et d'histoire 70 (2), 1992
