= Dodo of Cons =

Dodo of Cons (Dudo of Konz-Saarburg) (fl. 1096), lord of Cons-la-Grandville, a nobleman from the Lotharingian territories, son of Adelon (Adelo) de Cons. Dodo was originally from Konz, above Trier at the confluence of the Moselle and Sauer rivers. Dodo had taken the cross and joined in the First Crusade and was lucky enough to return unscathed along with his wife, a countess of Chiny.

Cons-la-Grandville was a commune of Meurthe-et-Moselle in what is now northeastern France on the river Chiers. Dodo was a benefactor of the abbey of Saint-Hubert to which he donated the priory of St Michael. His father, Adelo was master of the castle of Dun on the Meuse which had been given to the church of Verdun by Emperor Henry IV. On Adelo's death his lands were divided between his sons Walter, who received Dun, and Dodo who received Cons.

Dodo was a crusader who was one of the many leading knights from Walloon and the Lotharingian territories that joined the army of Godfrey of Bouillon in the First Crusade. These included Godfrey's brothers and their cousin Baldwin of Le Bourg, Baldwin II, Count of Hainaut, Rainald (or Reinhard), Count of Toul, Warner, Count of Grez, Baldwin of Stavelot, Peter of Stenay, and the brothers Henry and Godfrey of Esch. Dodo was known to have been at the siege of Nicaea in 1097.

Dodo married Hadvide of Chiny, daughter of Arnold I, Count of Chiny. Murray identifies her as "Hadwida, daughter of Arnulf II of Chiny" but such different spellings are common in historical documents. The confusion about the numbering is rampant among the counts of Chiny and Looz, especially once the countships merged.

Even before that, Arnold I and Arnold II, who were counts of Looz before the merger with the counts of Chiny, were often confused with each other. Dodo and Hadvide are not known to have had any children, although a son named Quino has been attributed to Dodo.

Hadvide accompanied her husband on the First Crusade. It is unclear what her role was during the crusade, but she did procure a complete set of vestments in black cloth and gold trim, and a chalice made of gold and adorned with jewels. These were donated to the monks of St. Hubert-en-Ardenne, named in honor of Hubert, Bishop of Liege, patron of archers, dogs, mathematicians and metal workers. Many of the original places of worship still exist at St. Hubert. The relic Clef de Saint-Hubert, which dates to the twelfth century, may include elements of this chalice. The vestments are not known to have survived.

== Sources ==
- Murray, Alan V., "The Army of Godfrey of Bouillon, 1096–1099: Structure and Dynamics of a Contingent on the First Crusade", Revue belge de philologie et d'histoire 70 (2), 1992
- Runciman, Steven, A History of the Crusades, Volume I: The First Crusade and the Foundation of the Kingdom of Jerusalem, Cambridge University Press, Cambridge, 1951
- Riley-Smith, Jonathan, The First Crusaders, 1095-1131, Cambridge University Press, Cambridge, 1997
- Le Long, Nicolas, Histoire Ecclésiastique et Civile du Duché De Luxembourg et Comté de Chiny, Chevalier, 1783 (available on Google Books)
