= Monteil =

Monteil is a French surname. Notable people with the surname include:

- Adhémar de Monteil, (died 1098), French bishop and soldier
- Amans-Alexis Monteil (1769–1850), French historian
- Charles Monteil (1871–1949), French civil servant, ethnologist and linguist. Brother of Parfait-Louis Monteil.
- Claudine Monteil (born 1949), French writer
- Germaine Monteil, French fashion designer
- Jean-Baptiste Adhémar de Monteil de Grignan, (1638–1697), French bishop
- Parfait-Louis Monteil (1855–1925), French military officer and explorer. Brother of Charles Monteil.
- Vincent Monteil (born 1964), French conductor

== See also ==
- Monteils (disambiguation)
