= Adam de Ireys =

English nobleman

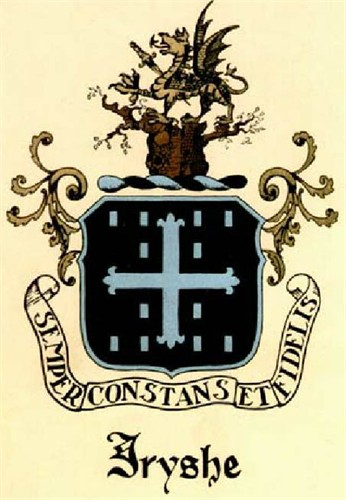
A representation of the Iryshe coat of arms, created around the year 1099 after the First Crusade, awarded to Adam de Ireys

Adam de Ireys was an English nobleman who was knighted after service during the First Crusade.

== Life and the Crusades ==
De Ireys was born in about 1070 in the town of Ireys in Dorset, England.

In 1096, Ireys accompanied Godfrey of Bouillon to Palestine on the First Crusade. In 1099, De Ireys played an active part in the taking of Jerusalem. During combat, de Ireys decapitated a high ranking Saracen with one sword blow. His son Hugh D'Iryshe (spelling was changed) was born near Jerusalem.

For his service in the Crusade, de Ireys was knighted and given the right to a coat of arms. He became a member of the Knights Hospitaller.

== Marriage ==
De Ireys married Joan Stutville, born in 1074 in Ireys. Stutville died around 1118 in Dorset.

== Death ==
Adam de Ireys died in England, in 1117.
