= Fronton du Duc =

French Jesuit theologian

Fronton du Duc (Latin: Ducæus; 1558 – 25 September 1624) was a French Jesuit theologian.

== Life ==
Fronton du Duc was born at Bordeaux in France. At first he taught in various colleges of the Society of Jesus, and wrote for the dramatic representations encouraged by the Jesuits the "Histoire tragique de la pucelle de Domrémy, autrement D'Orléans" (Nancy, 1581). It was acted at Pont-à-Mousson before Charles III, Duke of Lorraine. At a later date he took part in the theological discussions of the age and is the author of "Inventaires des faultes, contradictions, faulses allégations du Sieur Plessis, remarquées en son livre de la Sante Eucharistie, par les théologiens de Bordeaux" (Bordeaux, 1599–1601). This is one of the many refutations of the treatise on the Eucharist issued in 1598 by the Huguenot theologian Du Plessis-Mornay. The Protestant publicist made a reply to which Fronton de Duc rejoined in 1602. Librarian from 1604 of the Collège de Clermont, he reorganized the library, which had been scattered during the period in which the Jesuits had been obliged to abandon the school. While holding this position he also taught (1618–23) positive theology. He died at Paris.

== Works ==
At the suggestion of Casaubon, Henry IV of France contemplated the publication of manuscripts of the royal library. The clergy of France decided to confide the revision of the Greek Fathers to the Jesuits, and Fronton du Duc was chosen by the Society to labour on this project. Accordingly, he published the works of St. John Chrysostom (Paris, 1609–1624) and a "Bibliotheca veterum Patrum" (Paris, 1624, 2 vols. in folio). The "Bibliotheca" contains a large number of the Greek Fathers with Latin translations (see the list in Sommervogel, III, 245), and serves as a supplement to the great collection of Margarin de la Bigne known as the "Sacra Bibliotheca Sanctorum Patrum".

After the death of Fronton du Duc there was issued an edition of Nicephorus Callistus (Paris, 1620, 2 vols. in folio) which he had undertaken. This edition follows a Vienna manuscript that had belonged to the library of Matthias Corvinus; its publication had been delayed by a series of complications in which the political schemes of Richelieu were involved.

Fronton du Duc had also occupied himself with the Greek texts of the Bible and had begun a revision of the text, but this was not completed.
