= Neufmoustier Abbey =

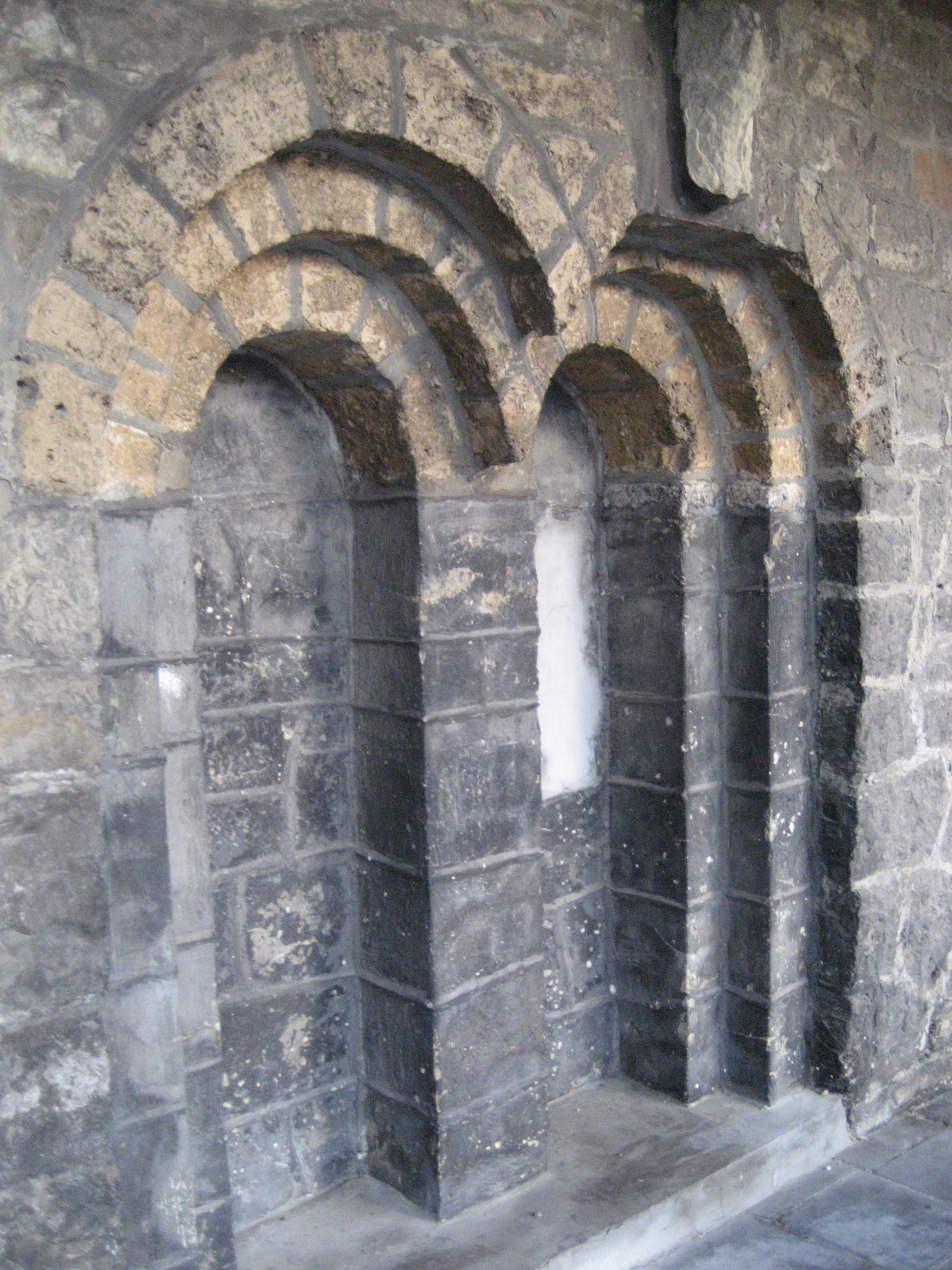
Detail of surviving abbey buildings

Neufmoustier Abbey (French: Abbaye du Neufmoustier) was built sometime after 1109 in the city of Huy, Wallonia, Belgium. It was an Augustinian abbey dedicated to the Holy Sepulchre and Saint John the Baptist. Today, a mansion with gardens occupies the site.

Legend has it that Conon, Count of Montaigu, with his son Lambert and Peter the Hermit, were returning by ship from the First Crusade when they encountered a fierce storm. They vowed to build a church if they were saved, and the storm immediately abated. Neufmoustier Abbey is the result of this vow. Peter lived at the abbey, where he was buried following his death in 1115.

The abbey itself served as a popular pilgrimage destination. According to local legend, pilgrims who could not fulfil their vow to travel to Jerusalem earned the same spiritual benefits by travelling the shorter distance to the abbey.

== Sources ==
- Riley-Smith, Jonathan, The First Crusaders, 105-1131, Cambridge University Press, London, 1997 (available on Internet Archive)
- Huy, The Encyclopædia Britannica, Volume 14, 1929 (Available on Google Books)
- Ralls, Karen, "The Templars and the Grail: Knights of the Quest", Theological Publishing House, Wheaton, IL 2003 (available on Google Books)
