= Gozelo II of Montaigu =

Gozelo II (died 1097), presumed Count of Montaigu, son of Conon, Count of Montaigu, and Ida of Boulogne, sister of Godfrey, first ruler of the Kingdom of Jerusalem. As the eldest son of Conon, it is assumed that he became the count upon his father's death in 1096.

As reported by both Albert of Aix and William of Tyre, Gozelo and his brother Lambert (the heirs of the count of Mortagne) took a major role in the First Crusade, participating in the Siege of Nicaea in 1097. They then joined the army of Robert II, Count of Flanders, marching on Antioch. Gozelo never made it to the subsequent siege, dying of disease in Artah.

Gozelo left no heirs and was succeeded by his brother Lambert as Count of Montaigu.
