= Counts of Montaigu =

The Counts of Montaigu were 12th century nobles of Lower Lotharingia who were closely associated with the Counts of Duras and Clermont. This particular place called Montaigu (Mons Acutus, pointy mountain) was a castle located on the river Ourthe, opposite Marcourt near La Roche in the Ardennes. The castle of Montaigu has been mostly destroyed, but a chapel and hermitage dedicated to Saint Thibaut still exists upon the mountain on which it was built.

The Counts of Montaigu were also lords of Rochefort. Rochefort is a municipality in Namur, and these holdings passed by inheritance to the Walcourt family, who married into the family of the Counts of Chiny, particularly Louis III.

The Counts of Montaigu were:

- Gozelo I (1038–1064)
- Cono (I), son of the previous (1064–1096)
- Gozelo II, son of the previous (1096–1097)
- Lambert, also Count of Clermont, brother of the previous (1097–1140)
- Godefroi, also Count of Clermont and Duras, son of the previous (1140–1161)
- Gilles, also Count of Clermont and Duras, son of the previous
- Cono (II), also Count of Duras, brother of the previous
- Wery II, also Seigneur of Walcourt, brother-in-law of the previous
- Thierry, also Seigneur of Walcourt, son of the previous and married to Gertrude, daughter of Louis III, Count of Chiny.

Cono I and his sons participated in the First Crusade with Godfrey of Bouillon. Thierry appears to have given up the countship of Montaigu although his great-grandson Thierry IV appears to have claimed dominion over three villages in the County of Montaigu.

The original Counts of Clermont appear to have originated with a Widrich (d. before 1062), father of Ermengarde, wife of Gozelo I, but it passed on to the Counts of Montaigu after Giselbert, Count of Clermont.

== Sources ==
- Les Seigneurs et Comtes de Rochefort, 1893
- Wolters, Mathias J., Notice Historique sur l’Ancien Comté de Duras en Hesbaie, Gyselinck, 1855 (available on Google Books)
- Runciman, Steven, A History of the Crusades, Volume I: The First Crusade and the Foundation of the Kingdom of Jerusalem, Cambridge University Press, Cambridge, 1951
- Murray, Alan V., The Army of Godfrey of Bouillon, 1096-1099: Structure and Dynamics of a Contingent on the First Crusade, Revue beige de philology et d'histoire, tome 70, fast. 2, 1992
