= Alberic of Trois-Fontaines =

Cistercian chronicler (died c. 1252)

Alberic of Trois-Fontaines (French: Aubri or Aubry de Trois-Fontaines; Latin: Albericus Trium Fontium) (fl. 1230–1251, died c. 1252) was a medieval Cistercian chronicler who wrote in Latin. He was a monk of Trois-Fontaines Abbey in the diocese of Châlons-sur-Marne. He died after 1252. He wrote a chronicle describing world events from the Creation to the year 1241.

== Life and works ==
Alberic was likely from a noble Liège family which could afford a good education for him. He became a monk of Trois-Fontaines Abbey no later than 1230.

In 1232, Alberic began his chronicle Chronica Albrici Monachi Trium Fontium and continued working on it until at least 1251 since he used a history by Gilles of Orval Gesta episcoporum Leodiensium ("Deeds of the Bishops of Liège"). His sources also included the universal chronicle of Sigebert of Gembloux and Books 45-49 of Helinand of Froidmont's Chronicon.

Alberic's chronicle describes world events from the Creation and contains original writing starting from 674, when (according to the chronicle) the relics of St. Benedict were moved from a monastery in Monte Cassino to the Fleury Abbey on the banks of the Loire. The chronicle ends abruptly with a description of the transfer of the body of Jacques de Vitry (d. 1240) to the Oignies Abbey in 1241.

Alberic's chronicle was published in the Monumenta Germaniae Historica in 1874.

== Bibliography ==
- Reindel, K., 'Petrus Damiani bei Helinand von Froidmont und Alberich von Troisfontaines', Deutsches Archiv für Erforschung des Mittelalters 53,1 (1997), 205–224.
- Schmidt-Chazan, "Aubri de Trois-Fontaines, un historien entre la France et l'Empire", Annales de l'Est, t.36, 1984, p. 163-192
- A. M. Wyrwa, Alberyk z Trois Fontaines i jego średniowieczna kronika świata, w: Cognitioni Gestorum. Studia z dziejów średniowiecza dedykowane Profesorowi Jerzemu Strzelczykowi, red. D.A. Sikorski, A.M. Wyrwa, Poznań-Warszawa 2006, s. 319–344
- A. M. Wyrwa, Alberyk z Trois-Fontaines o początkach chrześcijaństwa w Prusach, w: Wielkopolska - Polska – Czechy. Studia z dziejów średniowiecza ofiarowane Profesorowi Bronisławowi Nowackiemu, red. Z. Górczak, J. Jaskulski, Poznań 2009, s. 69–99
- Rech Régis. Alberich of Troisfontaines // Encyclopedia of the Medieval Chronicle, ed. by Graeme Dunphy and Cristian Bratu. — Leiden: Brill, 2016.
