= Le Monteil =

Le Monteil is the name or part of the name of several communes in France:

- Le Monteil, former name of the village Montel, part of the commune of Manzat in the Puy-de-Dôme department
- Le Monteil, Cantal, in the Cantal department
- Le Monteil, Dordogne, former commune of the Dordogne department, now part of the commune of Lamonzie-Saint-Martin
- Le Monteil, Haute-Loire, in the Haute-Loire department
- Le Monteil, Somme, former commune of the Somme, now part of the commune of Roiglise
- Le Monteil-au-Vicomte, in the Creuse department

== See also ==
- Monteils (disambiguation)
