= Gesta episcoporum Leodiensium =

13th-century history on the diocese of Liège

The Gesta episcoporum Leodiensium ('Deeds of the Bishops of Liège') is a history of the diocese of Liège written by the monk Gilles of Orval between 1247 and 1251. At about the same time, Gilles also composed an epitome of his history, the Gesta episcoporum Leodensium abbreviata. It was first edited by Johannes Heller for the Monumenta Germaniae Historica in 1880.

Gilles sought to continue the earlier gesta of Heriger of Lobbes and Anselm of Liège from 1048 down to 1247. As a historian, he was rather uncritical. His is the earliest account to mention any children of King Zwentibold.

== Sources ==
- De Grieck, Pieter-Jan (2013). "Giles of Orval". Encyclopedia of the Medieval Chronicle. Brill Online.
- Pixton, Paul B. (1995). The German Episcopacy and the Implementation of the Decrees of the Fourth Lateran Council, 1216–1245: Watchmen on the Tower. Leiden: E. J. Brill.
