= Monteils =

Monteils is the name or part of the name of several communes in France:

- Monteils, in the Aveyron department
- Monteils, in the Gard department
- Monteils, in the Tarn-et-Garonne department

== See also ==
- Monteille, in the Calvados department
- Le Monteil (disambiguation)
