= Lambert, Count of Montaigu =

Lambert (died 1140 or after), Count of Montaigu and Clermont, son of Conon, Count of Montaigu. Lambert was also Seigneur de Rochefort, Advocate of Dinant, and Advocate of Saint-Symphorien-des-Bois.

As reported by both Albert of Aix and William of Tyre, Lambert and his brother Gozelo took a major role in the First Crusade, participating in the Siege of Nicaea in 1097. Lambert was present at the siege of Acre in 1098, which finally fell after four years. He commanded one of the corps of the army of Godfrey of Bouillon, resulting in the capture of Antioch in 1098. Along with his father and Peter the Hermit, he founded Neufmoustier Abbey.

Lambert was married although there is some confusion as to his wife. Europäische Stammtafeln lists two possibilities. First is Gertrud de Louvain, daughter of Henry III, Count of Louvain, and Gertrude of Flanders. Second is a daughter of Giselbert, Count of Clermont whose name is unknown. The speculation on the second possibility is based on the connection between Lambert and the Counts of Clermont, but that connection is best explained by his paternal grandmother’s relationship with Clermont. Lambert and his wife (presumed to be Gertrud) had three children:

- Conon de Montaigu (d. after 1140)
- Godefroi, Count of Montaigu and Clermont, and Count of Duras by virtue of marriage
- Gertrude de Montaigu (d. after 10 September 1185), married first to Raoul de Nesle, Châtelain de Bruges, and second to Everard III Radoul, Châtelain de Tournai, grandson of Baldwin III, Count of Hainaut (his mother being Richildis of Hainaut). Two of their sons would become Counts of Soissons.

Upon his death, Lambert was succeeded as Count of Montaigu by his son Godefroi.

== Sources ==
- C. G. Roland (1893), "Les seigneurs et comtes de Rochefort", Annales de la Société archéologique de Namur, 20: 63–141.
- Runciman, Steven, A History of the Crusades, Volume I: The First Crusade and the Foundation of the Kingdom of Jerusalem, Cambridge University Press, Cambridge, 1951
- Europäische Stammtafeln
- Albert of Aix (Albertus Aquensis), Liber Christianae Expeditionis pro Ereptione, Emundatione et Restituitione Sanctae Hierosolymitanae Ecclesiae, in R.H.C.Occ., vol. iv
- William of Tyre, Historia Rerum in Partibus Transmarinis Gestarum, in R.H.C.Occ, vol. i, parts i and ii
- Murray, Alan V., The Army of Godfrey of Bouillon, 1096–1099: Structure and Dynamics of a Contingent on the First Crusade, Revue beige de philology et d'histoire, tome 70, fast. 2, 1992
