= Bouillon Castle =

Castle in Wallonia, Luxembourg, Belgium

- Château de Bouillon
- Belgium
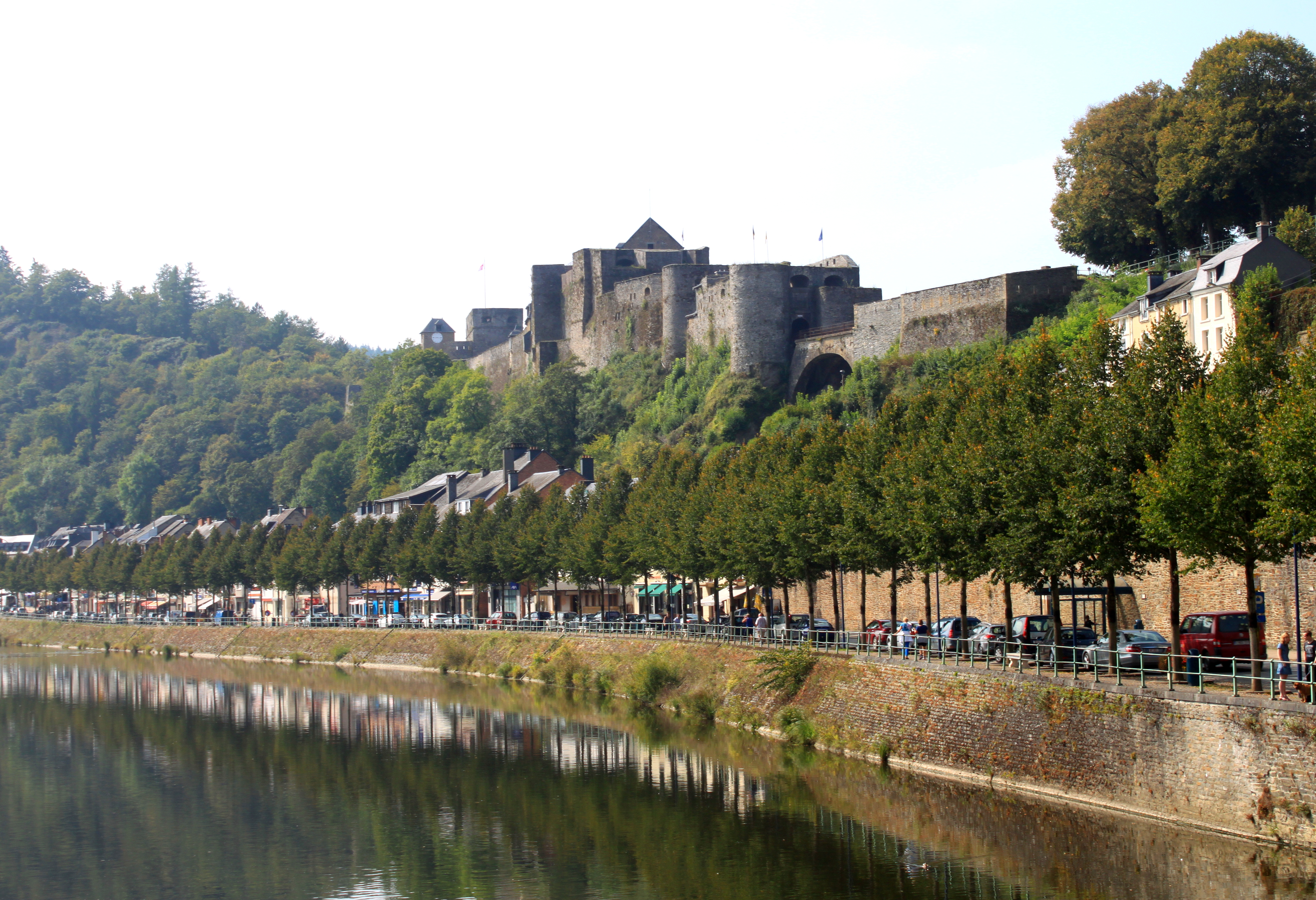
- The Castle, above the modern town of Bouillon

Site information
- Type: Castle
- Open to the public: Yes

Location
- Coordinates: 49.7927°N 5.0653°E

Bouillon Castle (French: Château de Bouillon, pronounced [ʃato də bujɔ̃]) is a medieval castle located in Wallonia in the town of Bouillon in the province of Luxembourg, Belgium.

Although it was mentioned first in 988, there had been a castle on the same site for a much longer time. The castle is situated on a rocky spur of land within a sharp bend of the Semois River.

In 1082, Bouillon Castle was inherited by Godfrey of Bouillon, who sold it to Otbert, Bishop of Liège in order to finance the First Crusade. The castle was later fitted for heavy artillery by Vauban, Louis XIV's military architect in the late 17th century.

== See also ==
- List of castles in Belgium
