= Warner of Grez =

French nobleman

Warner of Grez (also Werner or Garnier of Grey or Gray) (died 22 or 23 July 1100) Count of Grez, was a French nobleman from Grez-Doiceau, currently in Walloon Brabant in Belgium. He was one of the participants in the army of Godfrey of Bouillon of the First Crusade, and died in Jerusalem a year after the crusade ended. His brother Henry is also listed as a Count of Grez and accompanied Warner on the First Crusade.

In 1096 or 1097, Warner sold some of his land, the allod of Vaux, to the nearby church of Fosses in return for a gold chalice worth 20¼ marks, which helped finance his expenses on the crusade.

According to Albert of Aix, he was a relative of Godfrey of Bouillon, and accompanied him on the journey. He went with Godfrey to meet King Coloman of Hungary, and also to meet Byzantine emperor Alexius I Comnenus when they arrived at Constantinople.

He was mentioned by Albert at the Siege of Nicaea in 1097 and at the Siege of Antioch in 1098. William of Tyre says that when Fatimid envoys arrived from Egypt to meet the crusaders, Warner helped escort them back to the coast on their way home. However, Warner and the other escorts were ambushed by the inhabitants of the territory around Antioch when they were returning to the crusader camp. After the crusaders captured Antioch, they were in turn besieged by Kerbogha of Mosul, and Warner was part of the fifth division of the army that marched out to attack Kerbogha.

After the crusaders captured Jerusalem in 1099, Warner was one of the few who remained there with Godfrey. When Godfrey fell sick in 1100, Warner and Tancred, Prince of Galilee prepared a siege of Haifa with the Venetian fleet that had anchored at Jaffa. Warner became ill during the preparations and did not accompany the siege, but as Albert says, he was "conveyed to Jerusalem on a litter."

In Jerusalem, the new Latin Patriarch, Daimbert of Pisa, had made an agreement with Godfrey by which Jerusalem would become a possession of the church. When Godfrey died on 18 July, Warner and others from Godfrey's retinue did not want Daimbert to take control, so they seized the Tower of David and prevented Daimbert from entering. According to William of Tyre, this was a shameful act and contrary to Godfrey's wishes, but it may actually have been what Godfrey wanted. Warner sent messengers to Godfrey's brother Baldwin, Count of Edessa, but then Warner also died, on 23 July (other sources say 22 July). William said that his death was a vindication of Daimbert's claims, although Godfrey's other supporters held the Tower until Baldwin arrived, and the city remained in secular hands.

Albert says Warner "was buried with honour and Christian ritual in the valley of Jehosaphat in the entrance of the church of St Mary the Virgin and mother of Jesus Christ."

Albert says he was "a soldier irreproachable in the art of war" and William calls him a "valiant and intrepid warrior".

== Sources ==
Murray, Alan V., The Army of Godfrey of Bouillon, 1096–1099: Structure and Dynamics of a Contingent on the First Crusade, Revue beige de philology et d'histoire, tome 70, fast. 2, 1992
