= Casaubon =

Casaubon /kəˈsɔːbən/ is a surname. Notable people with the surname include:

- Isaac Casaubon (1559–1614), French classical scholar
- Méric Casaubon (1599–1671), French-English classical scholar, son of Isaac
- Marcelo Ebrard Casaubón (born 1959), head of government of the Mexican Federal District

== Fictional characters ==
- Edward Casaubon, character in Middlemarch, 1871–72 novel by George Eliot; see Middlemarch § Casaubon
- Casaubon, character in Foucault's Pendulum, 1988 novel by Umberto Eco
- Casaubon, character in several of Mary Gentle's science fiction/fantasy works
