= Adhemar of Le Puy =

11th-century French bishop and crusader (died 1098)

- Bishop of Le Puy-en-Velay
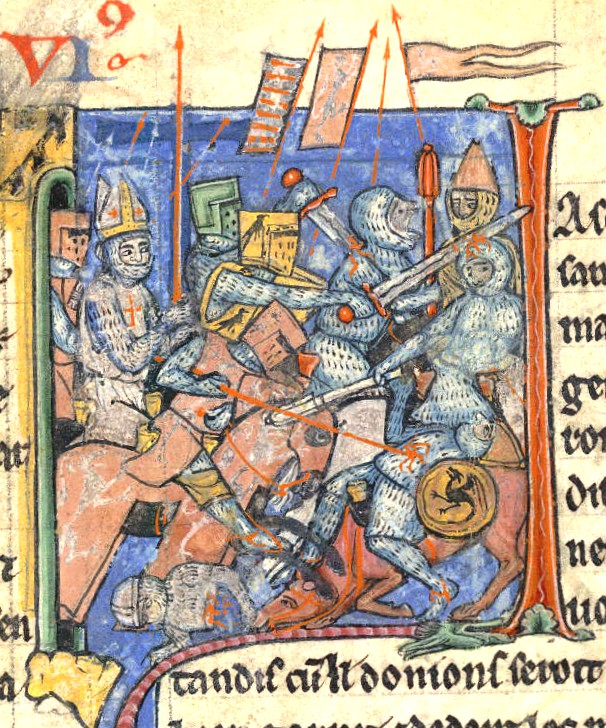
- A mitred Adhémar de Monteil carrying the Holy Lance in one of the battles of the First Crusade
- Church: Catholic Church
- See: Diocese of Le Puy-en-Velay
- In office: 1082–1098
- Predecessor: Stephan de Polignac
- Successor: Pons de Tournon

Personal details
- Born: 1055 Valentinois, Kingdom of France
- Died: 1 August 1098 (aged 43) Principality of Antioch

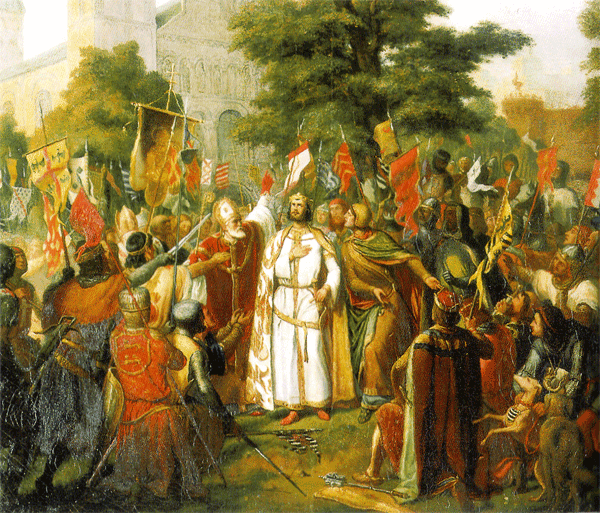
19th-century painting on display at Versailles depicting Adhemar of Le Puy (in red to left of Raymond IV, Count of Toulouse).

Adhemar (also known as Adémar, Aimar, or Aelarz) de Monteil (died 1 August 1098) was one of the principal figures of the First Crusade and was bishop of Puy-en-Velay from before 1087. He was the chosen representative of Pope Urban II for the expedition to the Holy Land. Remembered for his martial prowess, he led knights and men into battle and fought beside them, particularly at the Battle of Dorylaeum and Siege of Antioch. Adhemar is said to have carried the Holy Lance in the Crusaders’ desperate breakout at Antioch on 28 June 1098, in which superior Islamic forces under the atabeg Kerbogha were routed, securing the city for the Crusaders. He died in 1098 due to illness.

== Life ==
Born around 1045 into the family of the Counts of Valentinois and elected Bishop of Le Puy around 1080, he was an advocate of the Gregorian Reform. Among his supporters were the future Pope Urban II and Raymond of Saint-Gilles, Count of Toulouse and the richest, most powerful nobleman in France. He was also said to have gone on pilgrimage to Jerusalem around 1086. He was the brother of William Hugh of Monteil, who was also a Crusader in the First Crusade. Adhemar most likely met Pope Urban II, when he visited Puy in August 1095.

At the Council of Clermont in 1095, Adhemar showed great zeal for the crusade (there is evidence that Urban II had conferred with him before the council). He was named apostolic legate and appointed to lead the crusade by Pope Urban II on 27 November 1095. In part, Adhemar was selected to lead because he had already undertaken a pilgrimage to Jerusalem in 1086 and 1087. Following the announcement of the Crusade, her spent the next year raising money and recruiting men. Departing on 15 August 1096, he accompanied Raymond of Toulouse and his army to the east. Whilst Raymond and the other leaders often quarreled with each other over the leadership of the crusade, Adhemar was always recognized as the spiritual leader of the crusade and was widely respected by the majority of the Crusaders.

During the leg of the trip from Durazzo to Constantinople, in the valley of Pelagonia, Adhemar was set upon by a group of Pecheneg mercenaries, when he had wandered too far from the majority of the Crusader forces. The Pechenegs beat and robbed him, but began to fight among themselves over his belongings; Adhemar was saved by Crusader forces who had noticed the disturbance. Once the army had reached Thessalonica, Adhemar decided to stay there for some time due to sickness, whilst the Crusader forces moved onward, and eventually was able to rejoin them.

Adhemar negotiated with Alexius I Comnenus at Constantinople, reestablished some discipline among the crusaders at Nicaea, fought a crucial role at the Battle of Dorylaeum and was largely responsible for sustaining morale during the siege of Antioch through various religious rites including fasting and special observances of holy days. One such time he did this, was after an earthquake during the siege of Antioch, he had the Crusaders fast for three days and had the priests and clergy perform mass and prayers. Adhemar also ordered the Crusaders to shave and wear a cross in an attempt to stop Crusaders from attacking one another by accident. After the capture of the city in June 1098 and the subsequent siege led by Kerbogha, Adhemar organized a procession through the streets and had the gates locked so that the Crusaders, many of whom had begun to panic, would be unable to leave the city. He was extremely skeptical of Peter Bartholomew's discovery in Antioch of the Holy Lance, especially because he knew such a relic already existed in Constantinople; however, he was willing to let the Crusader army believe it was real if it raised their morale. Adhemar was protected by a band of Crusaders led by Henry of Esch to preserve the (albeit suspect) relic. In June 1098 Adhemar fell prey to sickness and in the following months his condition would deteriorate.

When Kerbogha was defeated, Adhemar organized a council in an attempt to settle the leadership disputes, but died on 1 August 1098, probably of typhus. Adhemar was buried in Antioch within the Basilica of St Peter. The disputes among the higher nobles went unsolved and the march to Jerusalem was delayed for months. However, the lower-class soldiers continued to think of Adhemar as a leader. Following his death, Adhemar reportedly appeared in several visions of various Crusaders. One of the first was reported by Peter Bartholomew who stated that Adhemar appeared to him stating that, due to his skepticism of the Holy Lance, he had spent a few days in hell and was only rescued because a candle had been burned in his memory, he had given a gift to the Shrine where the Holy Lance was kept, and due to the prayers of Bohemond. At the siege of Jerusalem, Peter Desiderius claimed that to have received a vision from Adhemar himself. Peter also claimed that, in this vision, Adhemar had instructed him to have the Crusaders fast and lead a procession around the Walls of Jerusalem. This was done and Jerusalem was taken by the Crusaders in 1099. Later, Stephen of Valence also claimed to have had visions featuring Adhemar in which Adhemar spoke to Stephen of several relics. Adhemar told Stephen great reverence should be given to the cross Adhemar had taken with him on the crusade. He also told Stephen how the Holy Lance should be treated and told Stephen to give Stephen's ring to Count Raymond. He told Stephen that, through this ring, Count Raymond would be able to call upon the power of Mary.
