= Gozelo I of Montaigu =

Count Gozelon (died 1064), was an 11th century count who held the forts Behogne at Rochefort, and Montaigu at Marcourt, which are both in the Ardennes in modern Belgium, but then part of Lower Lotharingia. He was also advocatus of the abbey of Saint-Barthélémy, Liège, beginning in 1043. Gozelon is the earliest known member of the family of counts of Montaigu that eventually also became counts of Duras, by marriage to an heiress. He is of unknown parentage.

The name Gozelon implies a family connection with the House of Verdun, who had several men with this name and a strong presence in the same Ardennes region. Gozlin, Count of the Ardennes, for example, had a grandson Gozelon, Count of Bastogne, the successor to his father Reginar. Another one of Gozlin's grandsons (the son of Godfrey the Captive), was also known as Gozelo, but there is no direct evidence for a relationship.

In 1038, in an act witnessed by Gozelon, Gothelo the Great (Duke of Lorraine), Arnold I of Looz, an unknown count named Sigebold, and the Archbishop of Trier Poppo von Babenberg, restored the monastery of St. Matheus of Trier.

Gozelon married Ermentrude (perhaps also known as Ermengarde) de Grandpré. Gozelon and Ermentrude had five children:

- Conon, Count of Montaigu
- Raoul of Montaigu
- Guy of Montaigu
- Jean of Montaigu (d. before 1112), Provost of Saint Pierre, likely Cathédrale Saint-Pierre d'Angoulême (Angoulême Cathedral)
- Henry of Montaigu (d. 1124 or after), Archdeacon and dean (decant) at Saint Lambert, Liège (1095).

Gozelon was succeeded as count of Montaigu by his son Conon, a knight in service of his brother-in-law Godfrey of Bouillon, the first ruler of the Kingdom of Jerusalem. For further details on the transition from Gozelon to his son, see Conon, Count of Montaigu.

Gozelon died in 1064 after pillaging Marloie, which was possessed by the abbey of Saint Hubert, the Apostle of the Ardennes. Gozelon was nevertheless buried at the church of the abbey.

== Sources ==
- Santinelli, Emmanuelle (2003). Des femmes éplorées?: Les veuves dans la société aristocratique du Moyen-Âge. Presses Universitaires du Septentrion. ISBN 9782859397777.
- C. G. Roland (1893), "Les seigneurs et comtes de Rochefort", Annales de la Société archéologique de Namur, 20: 63–141.
- Wolters, Mathias J., Notice Historique sur lAncien Comté de Duras en Hesbaie, McNally Jackson, 1855 (available on Google Books)
