= Giles of Orval =

13th century Cistercian monk and historian

Giles of Orval (French: Gilles d'Orval; Latin: Aegidius Aureaevallensis; fl. 1247–1251) was a Cistercian monk and historian. Originally from the prince-bishopric of Liège, he lived and worked in the abbey of Orval in the archdiocese of Trier. His major work was the Gesta episcoporum Leodiensium he compiled between 1247 and 1251. It is a history of his native diocese and its bishops from 1048 until his own time. At the same time he also composed a shorter version, the Gesta episcoporum Leodensium abbreviata. As a historian, Giles was rather uncritical with his sources, the most important of which were Heriger of Lobbes and Anselm of Liège.

== Sources ==
- De Grieck, Pieter-Jan (2013). "Giles of Orval". Encyclopedia of the Medieval Chronicle. Brill Online.
- Pixton, Paul B. (1995). The German Episcopacy and the Implementation of the Decrees of the Fourth Lateran Council, 1216–1245: Watchmen on the Tower. Leiden: E. J. Brill.
