= Otbert of Liège =

Bishop of Liège (died 1119)

Otbert of Liège (died 1119) was bishop of Liège at the end of the eleventh century (in office 1091–1119). He was a major figure in the financing of the First Crusade, and an expansionist.

He was a close supporter of Emperor Henry IV, accompanying him on campaigns.

In 1096 he took the whole Duchy of Godfrey of Bouillon as a pledge, for a sum of 1300 marks. He also bought the château de Couvin from Baldwin II, Count of Hainaut. At the same time he prevailed in a conflict over the comté de Brugeron, with Godfrey I of Leuven
