= Henry of Verdun =

Former Prince-Bishop of Liège

Henry of Verdun was bishop of Liège from 1075 to 1091. He owed his election to the influence of his relative Godfrey IV, Duke of Lower Lorraine, with the Emperor Henry IV.

Henry took part in the Synod of Worms (1076). He was instrumental in refortifying Mirwart castle, which brought enmity from the abbey of Saint-Hubert.

Despite being an imperial supporter in the Investiture Controversy, he built up his diocese by acquisitions (e.g. of Waremme in 1078, Donceel). Internally he operated as guardian of the Peace of God from 1081, and instituted a court system.

== Bibliography ==
- Geary, Patrick J., ed. (2010). Readings in Medieval History (4th ed.). University of Toronto Press.
- Gislebertus (2005). Chronicle of Hainaut. Translated by Napran, Laura. The Boydell Press.
- Robinson, I. S. (1999). Henry IV of Germany 1056-1106. Cambridge University Press.
- H. Vanderlinden, Le tribunal de la paix de Henri de Verdun (1082) et la transformation de la principauté de Liège, in Mélanges Henri Pirenne (1926), 2:589–96.
