= Siege of Nicaea =

Part of the First Crusade (1097)

Coordinates: 40.5833°N 30.1333°E

- Part of the First Crusade and Byzantine–Seljuk wars
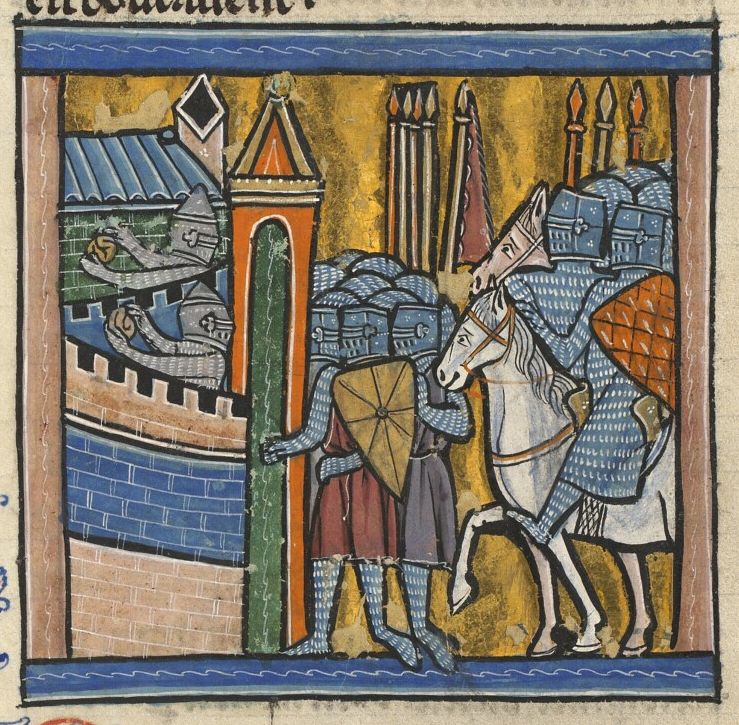
- 13th-century miniature (BNF Fr. 779)
Date	14 May – 19 June 1097
Location	Nicaea (present-day İznik, Turkey)
Result	Crusader-Byzantine victory
Territorial changes	Nicaea restored to the Byzantine Empire

Belligerents
Crusaders; Byzantine Empire	Sultanate of Rûm

Commanders and leaders
Bohemond of Taranto; Raymond IV of Toulouse; Adhemar of Le Puy; Godfrey of Bouillon; Robert II of Normandy; Robert II of Flanders; Stephen of Blois; Tancred of Hauteville; Hugh of Vermandois; Eustace III of Boulogne; Baldwin of Boulogne; Manuel Boutoumites; Tatikios	Kilij Arslan

Strength
Crusaders: ~30,000 infantry ~4,200–4,500 cavalry Byzantines: 2,000 light infantry and naval support	Nicaean garrison: Unknown, but sizeable Kilij Arslan's relief force: ~10,000, mostly mounted archers

Casualties and losses
Unknown	~4,000

The siege of Nicaea was the first major battle of the First Crusade, taking place from 14 May to 19 June 1097. The city was under the control of the Seljuk Turks who opted to surrender to the Byzantines in fear of the Crusaders breaking into the city. The siege was followed by the Battle of Dorylaeum and the Siege of Antioch, all taking place in modern Turkey.

== Background ==
Nicaea, located on the eastern shore of Lake Askania, had been captured from the Byzantine Empire by the Seljuk Turks in 1081, and Nicaea formed the capital of the Sultanate of Rûm. In 1096, the People's Crusade, the first stage of the First Crusade, had plundered the land surrounding the city before being destroyed by the Turks. As a result, sultan Kilij Arslan initially felt that the second wave of Crusaders was not a threat. He left his family and his treasury behind in Nicaea and went east to fight the Danishmendids for control of Melitene.

== Crusader siege ==
The Crusaders began to leave Constantinople at the end of April 1097. Godfrey of Bouillon was the first to arrive at Nicaea, with Bohemond of Taranto, Bohemond's nephew Tancred, Raymond IV of Toulouse, and Robert II of Flanders following him, along with Peter the Hermit and some of the survivors of the People's Crusade, and a small Byzantine force under Manuel Boutoumites.

The Crusaders arrived on 6 May, severely short of food, but Bohemond arranged for food to be brought by land and by sea. They put the city to siege beginning on 14 May, assigning their forces to different sections of the walls, and sent a message to Raymond telling him to hurry his advance to aid the siege. Bohemond camped on the north side of the city, Godfrey on the south, and Raymond and Adhemar of Le Puy on the eastern gate.

== Defeat of Kilij Arslan ==
On 16 May the Turkish defenders sallied out to attack the crusaders, but the Turks were defeated in a skirmish, losing 200 men. The Turks sent messages to Kilij Arslan begging him to return, and when he realized the strength of the crusaders he quickly turned back. An advance party was defeated by troops under Raymond and Robert on 20 May. On 21 May the Crusader army defeated Kilij in a pitched battle which lasted long into the night. Losses were heavy on both sides, but in the end the sultan retreated despite the pleas of the Nicaean Turks.

The rest of the Crusaders continued to arrive in the last weeks of May; Robert Curthose (accompanied by Ralph de Guader) and Stephen of Blois arrived in early June. Meanwhile, Raymond and Adhemar built a large siege engine, which was rolled up to the Gonatas Tower in order to engage the defenders on the walls, while sappers mined the tower from below. The tower was damaged, but no further progress was made.

== Byzantine arrival ==
Reading of the contemporary description of the siege, from the Crusaders' perspective, Gesta Francorum - Liber II in Latin with English subtitles

Byzantine emperor Alexios I chose not to accompany the crusaders, but he marched out behind them and made his camp at nearby Pelecanum. From there he sent boats (rolled over the land) to help the crusaders blockade Lake Ascanius, which was being used by the Turks to supply Nicaea with food. The boats arrived on 17 June, under the command of Manuel Boutoumites. General Tatikios was also sent with 2,000 foot soldiers. Alexios had instructed Boutoumites to secretly negotiate the surrender of the city without the crusaders' knowledge. Tatikios was instructed to join with the crusaders and make a direct assault on the walls, while Boutoumites would pretend to do the same to make it look as if the Byzantines had captured the city in battle. This was done, and on 19 June the Turks surrendered to Boutoumites.

When the Crusaders discovered what Alexios had done, they were quite angry, as they had hoped to plunder the city for money and supplies. Boutoumites, however, was named dux of Nicaea and forbade the Crusaders from entering in groups larger than 10 men at a time. Boutoumites also expelled the Turkish generals, whom he considered just as untrustworthy. Kilij Arslan's family went to Constantinople and were eventually released without ransom. Alexios gave the Crusaders money, horses, and other gifts, but they were not pleased with this, believing they could have had even more if they had captured Nicaea themselves. Boutoumites would not permit them to leave until they had all sworn an oath of vassalage to Alexios, if they had not yet done so in Constantinople. As he had in Constantinople, Tancred at first refused, but he eventually gave in.

== Aftermath ==
The Crusaders left Nicaea on 26 June in two contingents: Bohemond, Tancred, Robert II of Flanders, and Tatikios in the vanguard; and Godfrey, Baldwin of Boulogne, Stephen, and Hugh of Vermandois in the rear. Tatikios was instructed to ensure the return of captured cities to the empire. Their spirits were high, and Stephen wrote to his wife Adela that they expected to be in Jerusalem in five weeks. On 1 July they defeated Kilij at the first Battle of Dorylaeum, and by October they reached Antioch; they would not reach Jerusalem until two years after leaving Nicaea.
