= Godfrey of Bouillon =

Ruler of Jerusalem from 1099 to 1100

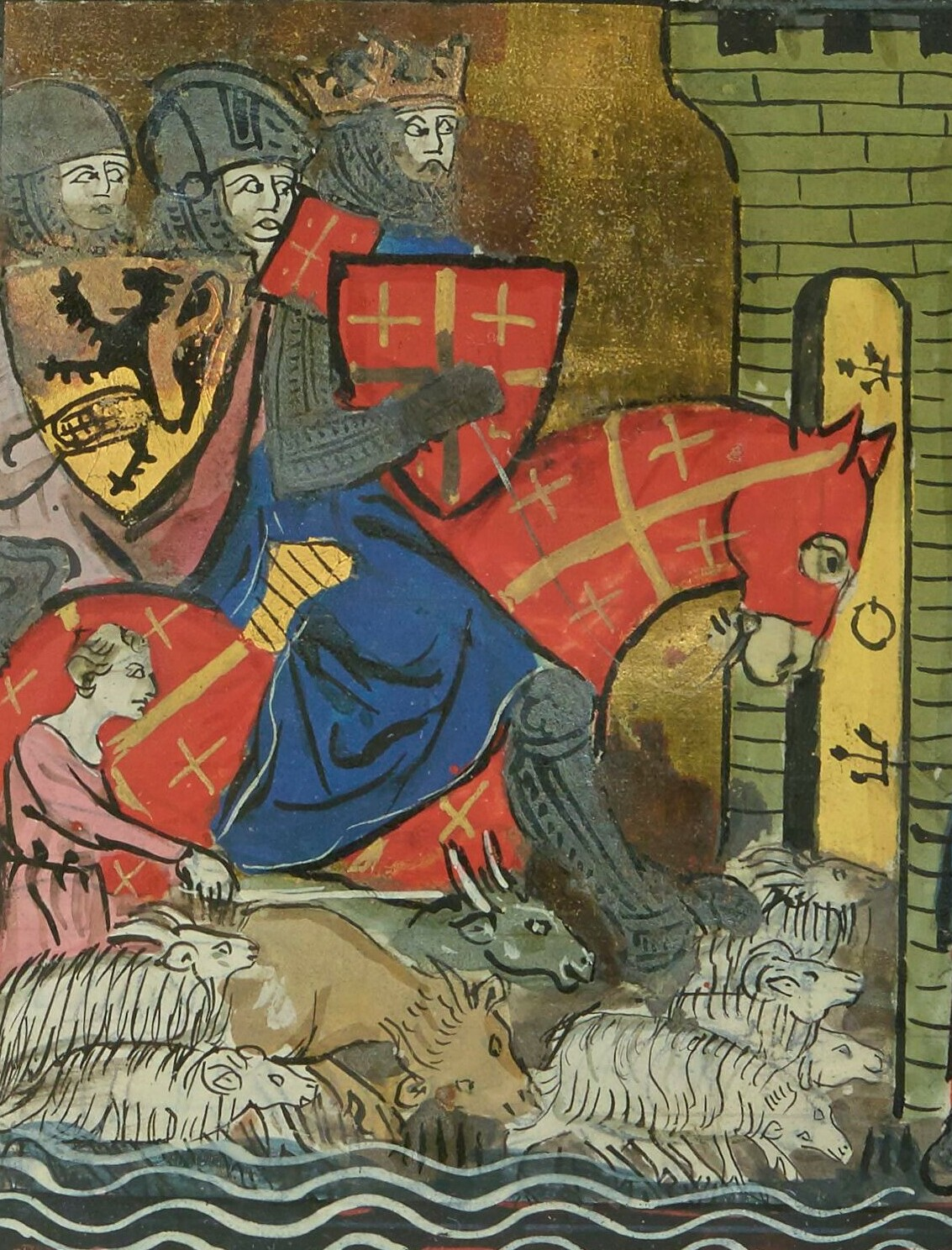
- Godfrey of Bouillon, from the Roman de Godefroy de Bouillon by Maître du Roman de Fauvel, c. 1330

Advocate of the Holy Sepulchre
- Reign: 22 July 1099 – 18 July 1100
- Successor: Baldwin I (as King of Jerusalem)

Duke of Lower Lorraine
- Reign: 1089–1096
- Predecessor: Conrad
- Successor: Henry I
- Born: c. 1060; Boulogne, County of Flanders
- Died: 18 July 1100 (aged 39–40); Jerusalem, Kingdom of Jerusalem
- Burial: Church of the Holy Sepulchre, Jerusalem
- House: Flanders
- Father: Eustace II of Boulogne
- Mother: Ida of Lorraine
- Religion: Roman Catholicism

Godfrey of Bouillon (Note: (French: Godefroy; Dutch: Godfried; German: Gottfried; Latin: Godefridus Bullionensis; Greek: Ὁφριου δὲ Ποιλιποῦν)) (c. 1060 – 18 July 1100) was a preeminent leader of the First Crusade, and the first ruler of the Kingdom of Jerusalem from 1099 to 1100. Although initially reluctant to take the title of king, he agreed to rule as prince (princeps) under the title Advocatus Sancti Sepulchri, or Advocate of the Holy Sepulchre.

He was the second son of Eustace II, Count of Boulogne in present day France. He received an inheritance from his mother's family in 1076 when he became Lord of Bouillon, which is now in Belgium. In 1087, Emperor Henry IV also confirmed him as Duke of Lower Lorraine, in reward for his support during the Great Saxon Revolt.

Along with his brothers Eustace III and Baldwin of Boulogne, Godfrey joined the First Crusade in 1096. He took part in actions at Nicaea, Dorylaeum, and Antioch, before playing a key role during the capture of Jerusalem in 1099. When Raymond IV, Count of Toulouse declined the offer to become ruler of the new kingdom, Godfrey accepted the role and secured his kingdom by defeating the Fatimids at Ascalon a month later, bringing the First Crusade to an end. He died in July 1100 and was succeeded by his brother Baldwin as King of Jerusalem.

== Early life ==
Godfrey of Bouillon was born around 1060, probably in Boulogne-sur-Mer, although one 13th-century chronicler cites Baisy, a town in what is now Walloon Brabant, Belgium. He was the second son (Note: The genealogy of the counts of Boulogne does not specify the ages of Eustace's sons, but the order in which they were listed was presumably the birth order: Eustace, then Godfrey, then Baldwin.) of Ida of Lorraine and Eustace II, Count of Boulogne, an important political figure at the time and a companion of William the Conqueror. Eustace was rewarded extensive lands in England after the Battle of Hastings, making him one of the wealthiest landowners in the country. Godfrey's mother, Ida of Lorraine, was the daughter of duke Godfrey III of Lower Lorraine and a sister of duke Godfrey the Hunchback. Ida was an educated woman who strongly influenced the upbringing of her sons. It is most likely that Godfrey started his military training before the age of ten, learning how to ride a horse and use a sword, shield, lance, and crossbow while mounted.

When Godfrey's uncle, Godfrey the Hunchback, was murdered on February 22 of 1076 without issue, he had already designated his nephew as his heir. The younger Godfrey probably had a bond with his uncle before this, and the contemporary chronicle of St Hubert (Note: Also known as the Cantatorium) suggests that he attended his burial in Verdun. Godfrey then spent several weeks at the monastery of St Hubert in the protection of his kinsman Henry of Verdun, bishop of Liège. Lampert of Hersfeld records that at this time, Godfrey was "an energetic young man, very eager for military action".

=== Battle for inheritance ===
Godfrey's inheritance was challenged by several claimants in the years following his uncle's death. Henry IV, the future Holy Roman Emperor—wishing to strengthen his position—appointed his two-year-old son, Conrad, as the Duke of Lower Lorraine instead of Godfrey. Godfrey was instead given the Margraviate of Antwerp, held by his predecessors, and his appointment to this title implied that Henry considered giving Godfrey Lower Lorraine in the future. Conrad's title was merely symbolic; Henry installed Albert III of Namur, a loyal supporter of his, to rule the duchy as 'vice-duke'.

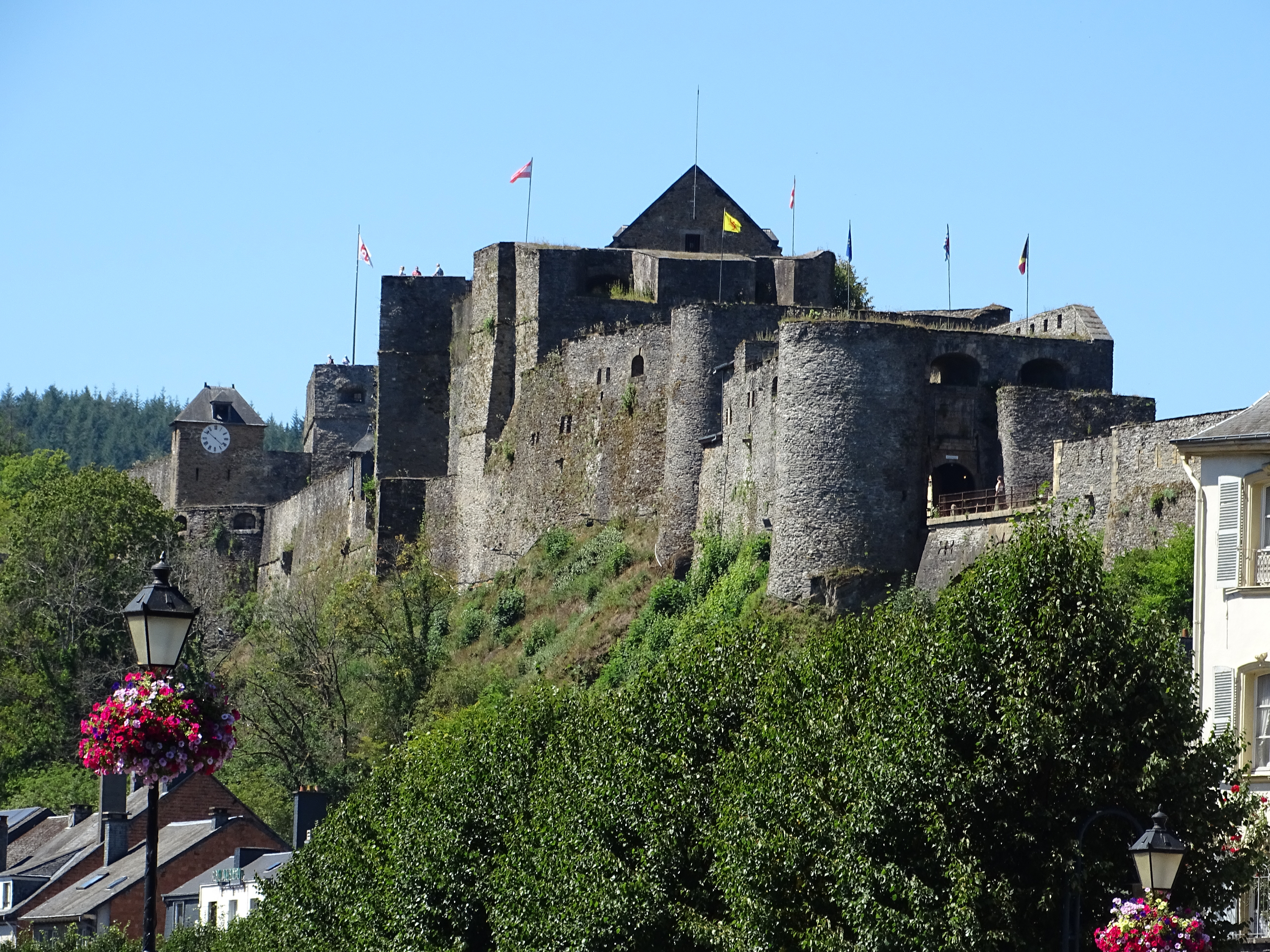
Godfrey's claim to Bouillon Castle was challenged by Albert III of Namur.

Almost immediately, Godfrey entered a conflict with Albert, who claimed Bouillon Castle from him; it is recorded that Albert left the aforementioned dispute feeling unfulfilled. Albert proceeded to forge an alliance with Godfrey the Hunchback's widow, Matilda of Tuscany, and Theoderic, the bishop of Verdun, to deprive Godfrey of his influence. Matilda—who already had extensive lands in Northern Italy—sought her late husband's lands in Lotharingia, while Theoderic wished to strengthen his influence in the diocese at Godfrey's expense. Matilda enlisted support from Pope Gregory VII in this pursuit, who sent archbishop Manasses I of Reims to arbitrate. The pope likely instructed Manasses to find in Matilda's favour instead of mediating neutrally, and he obliged to win papal favour. In around 1081, however, Theoderic renounced his alliance with Matilda in favour of Henry IV, who accused Matilda of treason and stripped her of her lands and property on both sides of the alps.

In 1081-2, Godfrey entered a conflict with Count Theoderic of Veluwe, whom he captured and imprisoned in Bouillon Castle. Since Theoderic had a close relationship with Henry IV, Godfrey ordered that the former be treated well, but the count died after six months in captivity. Theoderic's death enabled Godfrey to extend his influence around Bouillon. Later in 1082, Godfrey entered another conflict with Albert of Namur, who wished to restore Mirwart Castle and use it to wage war against Godfrey. Henry of Verdun—who "favoured Godfrey in all ways"—purchased the castle in order to prevent this and transferred it to St Hubert.

Godfrey supported Henry of Verdun's efforts to institute the Peace of God in his diocese, a movement already active in France to decrease endemic military activity by banning it during select times; those who violated the Peace risked excommunication along with losing their inheritance and belongings. Henry probably wanted to institute the Peace to alleviate the tensions caused by Godfrey the Hunchback's death. Henry became the first German bishop to institute the Peace during an assembly held in Easter of 1082 (which Godfrey likely attended), and in 1085, it was instituted throughout the entire Empire.

Godfrey supported Henry even during his struggle with Pope Gregory VII during the Investiture Controversy. Godfrey fought alongside Henry and his forces against Rudolf of Swabia and in Italy when Henry captured Rome itself. A major test of Godfrey's leadership skills was shown in his battles to defend his inheritance against a significant array of enemies. In 1076, he had succeeded as designated heir to the Lotharingian lands of his uncle, Godfrey the Hunchback, and Godfrey was struggling to maintain control over the lands that Henry IV had not taken away from him. Claims were raised by his aunt Margravine Matilda of Tuscany, cousin Count Albert III of Namur, and Count Theoderic of Veluwe. This coalition was joined by Bishop Theoderic of Verdun, and two minor counts attempting to share in the spoils, Waleran I of Limburg and Arnold I of Chiny.

As these enemies tried to take away portions of his land, Godfrey's brothers, Eustace and Baldwin, both came to his aid. Following these long struggles and proving that he was a loyal vassal to Henry IV, Godfrey finally gained Lower Lorraine in 1087.

== First Crusade ==
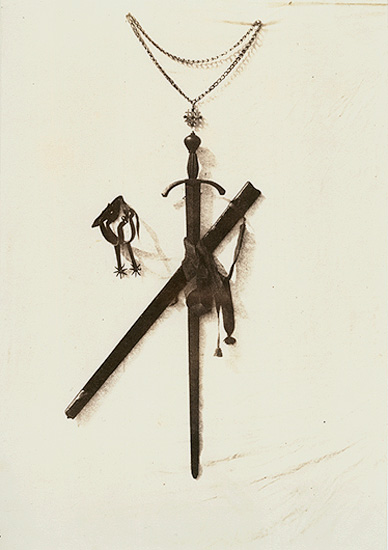
The "sword of Godfrey of Bouillon" displayed at the Church of the Holy Sepulchre in Jerusalem since 1808 (1854 photograph)

In 1095, Pope Urban II called for military action in order to liberate Jerusalem and aid the Byzantine Empire, which in the years since 1071 had lost large swathes of territory to the Seljuk Empire. Godfrey either sold or mortgaged most of his estates to the bishops of Liège and Verdun and used the money to recruit an army of Crusaders. He was joined by his older brother, Eustace, and his younger brother, Baldwin, who had no lands in Europe and was seeking them in the Holy Land. Others did the same, the largest being that raised by Raymond IV, Count of Toulouse, who at 55 was the oldest and most experienced of the Crusader nobles. As a result, he expected to lead the expedition, a claim boosted by the presence of Adhemar of Le Puy, the papal legate who travelled with him. Significant forces also accompanied Bohemond of Taranto, a Norman knight from southern Italy, and Robert II, Count of Flanders.

Godefroy de Bouillon leaving for Holy Land

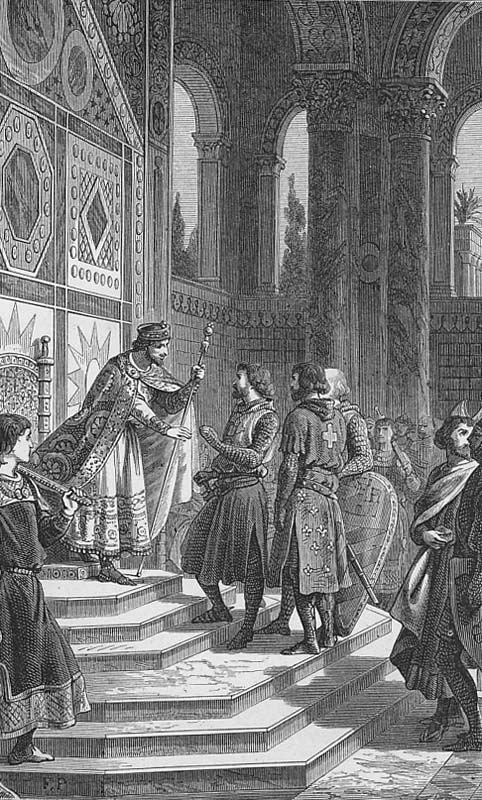
Godfrey with his brothers Eustace and Baldwin meeting with Byzantine emperor Alexios I Komnenos

Following advice provided by Pope Urban, most of these armies set out in mid-summer and headed for Constantinople where they could expect assistance from Emperor Alexios I Komnenos. Each travelled separately, since it was impossible for one region to feed and supply such large numbers on their own; the first to leave in spring 1096 was what became known as the People's Crusade, an army of 20,000 low ranking knights and peasants which journeyed through the Rhineland, then headed for Hungary. Most of those from southern and northern France sailed from Brindisi across the Adriatic Sea, while Godfrey and his two brothers, leading an army from Lorraine reportedly 40,000 strong, set out in August 1096 following the route taken by the People's Crusade.

Pope Urban II's call for the crusade spurred a wave of violence against Jews across Europe, beginning with Rouen in December 1095. In the spring and early summer of 1096, members of the People's Crusade plundered and massacred Jewish communities during the Rhineland massacres.

After the People's Crusade entered Hungary in June, a series of incidents had culminated in a full-scale battle with their hosts and the deaths of over 10,000 Crusaders; as a result, when Godfrey and his troops approached the border in September, it took several days of negotiations before they were allowed in. He finally reached Constantinople in November, shortly after those led by Hugh of Vermandois while others arrived over the next few months. Unlike the limited numbers he had anticipated, by May 1097, Alexios found himself with over 4,000 to 8,000 mounted knights and 25,000 to 55,000 infantry camped on his doorstep. This mattered because the two sides had different goals; Alexios simply wanted help in retaking Byzantine lands lost to the Seljuk Turks, while the Crusaders sought to liberate the Holy Land from the Muslims. When Alexios demanded an oath of loyalty, Godfrey and most of the Crusaders agreed to a modified version in which they promised to restore some lands to the Emperor, Raymond of Toulouse being a notable exception: he would just promise to do the Emperor no harm.

=== Capture of Nicaea and Antioch ===
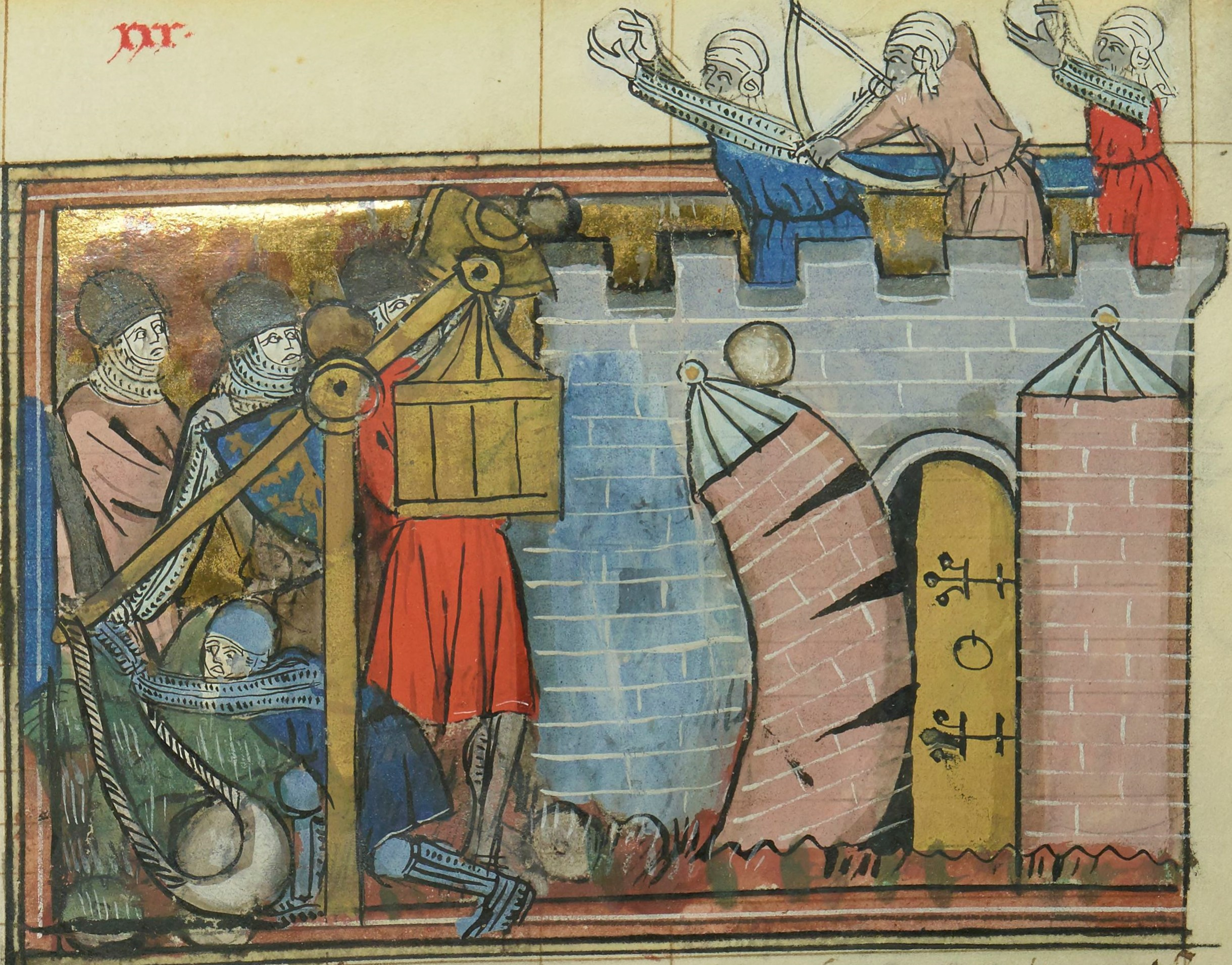
Siege of Nicaea in 1097. Miniature from Roman de Godefroy de Bouillon et de Saladin

In February 1097, Godfrey and his army crossed the Bosporus Straits, where he was joined by Bohemond, Robert of Flanders and Hugh of Vermandois. Accompanied by Byzantine soldiers, in early May the Crusaders invested Nicaea, a city close to Constantinople captured by the Turks in 1085. Godfrey and his troops played a minor role, with Bohemond successfully commanding much of the action but as the Crusaders were about to storm the city, they noticed the Byzantine flag flying from the top of the walls. Wanting to minimise damage to what was an important Byzantine city and suspecting the Crusaders would demand a heavy ransom for handing it over, Alexios had made a separate peace with the Turkish garrison. Although the majority of the Crusader leaders accepted Alexios' right to do so, it was an illustration of the level of mutual suspicion between the two sides.

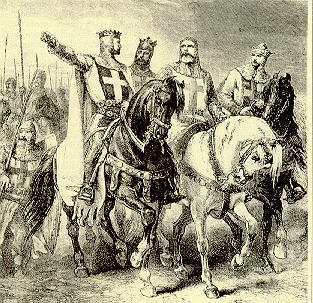
1883 portrayal of Godfrey and other leaders of the First Crusade, by Alphonse-Marie-Adolphe de Neuville

Godfrey continued to play a minor, yet significant, role in the battles against the Seljuks until the Crusaders finally reached Jerusalem in 1099. At Dorylaeum in July 1097, he helped relieve the vanguard at Dorylaeum which had been pinned down by a Turkish force under Kilij Arslan I, then sacked their camp. After this battle and during the trek through Asia Minor, some sources suggest that Godfrey was attacked by a bear and received a serious wound which incapacitated him for a time.

Godfrey also took part in the Siege of Antioch, which began in October 1097 and did not surrender until June 1098 after long and bitter fighting. During the winter, the crusading army came close to starvation and many returned to Europe, while Alexios assumed all was lost at Antioch and failed to provide them with supplies as promised. When the city finally fell, Bohemond claimed it for himself and refused to hand it over to the Emperor citing the Emperor's failure to help the crusaders at Antioch as breaking the oath; after repulsing a Muslim force from Mosul led by Kerbogha, Antioch was secured.

=== March on Jerusalem ===
After this victory, the Crusaders were divided over their next course of action. The bishop of Le Puy had died at Antioch. Bohemond decided to remain behind in order to secure his new principality; and Godfrey's younger brother, Baldwin, also decided to stay in the north in the Crusader state he had established at Edessa. Most of the foot soldiers wanted to continue south to Jerusalem, but Raymond IV of Toulouse—who was by then the most powerful of the princes, having taken others into his employ, such as Tancred—hesitated to continue the march. After months of waiting, the common people on the crusade forced Raymond to march on to Jerusalem, and Godfrey quickly joined him. As they travelled south into Palestine, in place of the Seljuk Turks, the Crusaders instead encountered the armies of the Fatimids, who had taken Jerusalem in August 1098.

The siege of Jerusalem began when the Crusader army reached the city in June 1099 and built a wooden siege tower (from lumber provided by some Italian sailors who intentionally scrapped their ships) to get over the walls. The major attack took place on 14 and 15 July 1099. Godfrey and some of his knights were the first to take the walls and enter the city. After three years of fighting, the Crusaders' victory marked the consummation of their main goals—to recapture the Holy Land and, in particular, the city of Jerusalem and its holy sites, such as the Holy Sepulchre. Godfrey endowed the hospital in the Muristan after the First Crusade.

== Kingdom of Jerusalem ==
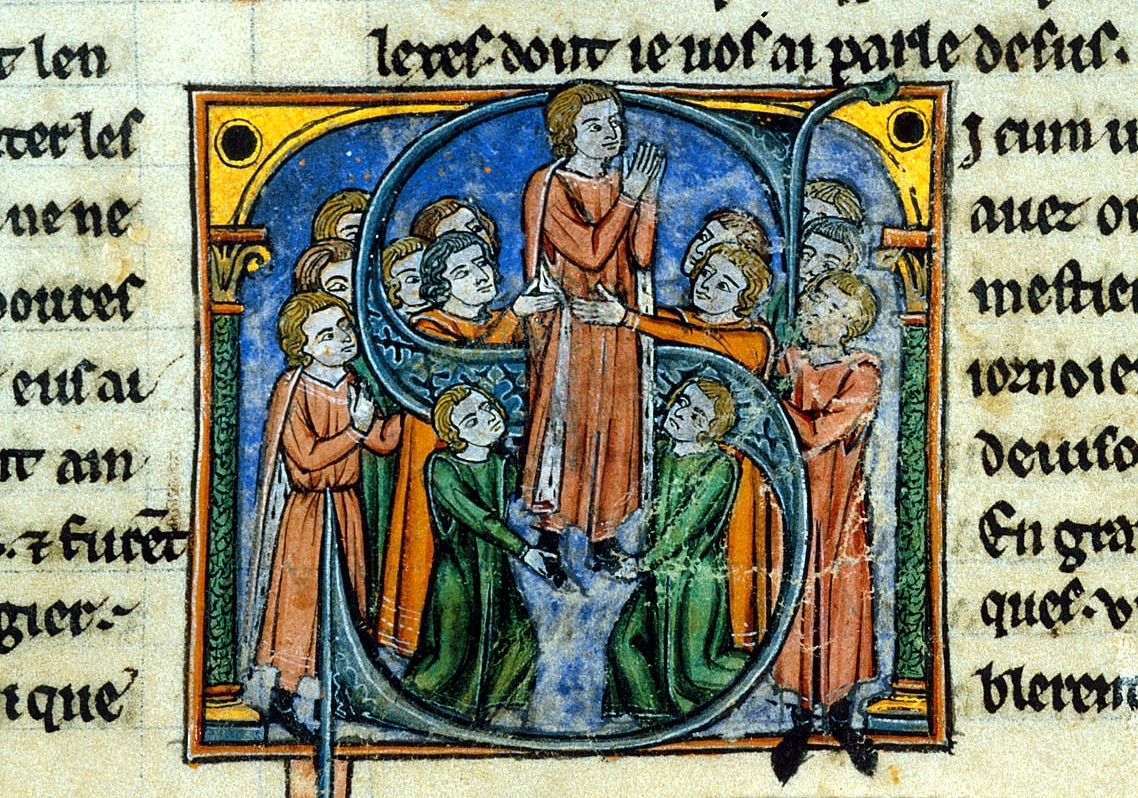
Godfrey of Bouillon being created the Lord of the city. From the Histoire d'Outremer by William of Tyre, detail of an historiated initial S, in a British Library Manuscript in the Yates Thompson Collection (No. 12, fol. 46), 13th century.

Once the city was returned to Christian rule, some form of government had to be set up. On 22 July 1099, a council was held in the Church of the Holy Sepulchre and after Raymond of Toulouse had refused the crown, Godfrey agreed to become ruler. However, he preferred the title Advocate of the Holy Sepulchre to that of king, allegedly refusing to "wear a crown of gold where his Saviour had worn a crown of thorns. Both the meaning and usage of his title is disputed. Some of the original chroniclers used the more ambiguous term princeps, or his previous rank of duke. Later chroniclers who did not participate in the First Crusade suggest he took the title of rex, "king".

During his short reign, Godfrey had to defend the new kingdom against the Fatimids of Egypt, who were defeated at the Battle of Ascalon in August. He also faced opposition from Dagobert of Pisa, the Latin Patriarch of Jerusalem, who was allied with Tancred. Although the Latins came close to capturing Ascalon, Godfrey's attempts to prevent Raymond of Toulouse from securing the city for himself meant that the town remained in Muslim hands, destined to be a thorn in the new kingdom's side for years to come.

In 1100, Godfrey was unable to directly expand his new territories through conquest. However, his impressive victory in 1099 and his subsequent campaigning in 1100 meant that he was able to force Acre, Ascalon, Arsuf, Jaffa, and Caesarea to become tributaries. Meanwhile, the struggle with Dagobert continued, although the terms of the conflict are difficult to trace. Dagobert may well have envisaged turning Jerusalem into a fiefdom of the pope, but his full intentions are not clear. Much of the evidence for this comes from William of Tyre, whose account of these events is troublesome; it is only William who tells us that Dagobert forced Godfrey to concede Jerusalem and Jaffa, while other writers such as Albert of Aachen and Ralph of Caen suggest that both Dagobert and his ally Tancred had sworn an oath to Godfrey to accept only one of his brothers or blood relations as his successor. Whatever Dagobert's schemes, they were destined to come to naught. Being at Haifa at the time of Godfrey's death, he could do nothing to stop Godfrey's supporters, led by Warner of Grez, from seizing Jerusalem and demanding that Godfrey's brother Baldwin should succeed to the rule. Dagobert was subsequently forced to crown Baldwin as the first Latin king of Jerusalem on 25 December 1100.

== Death ==
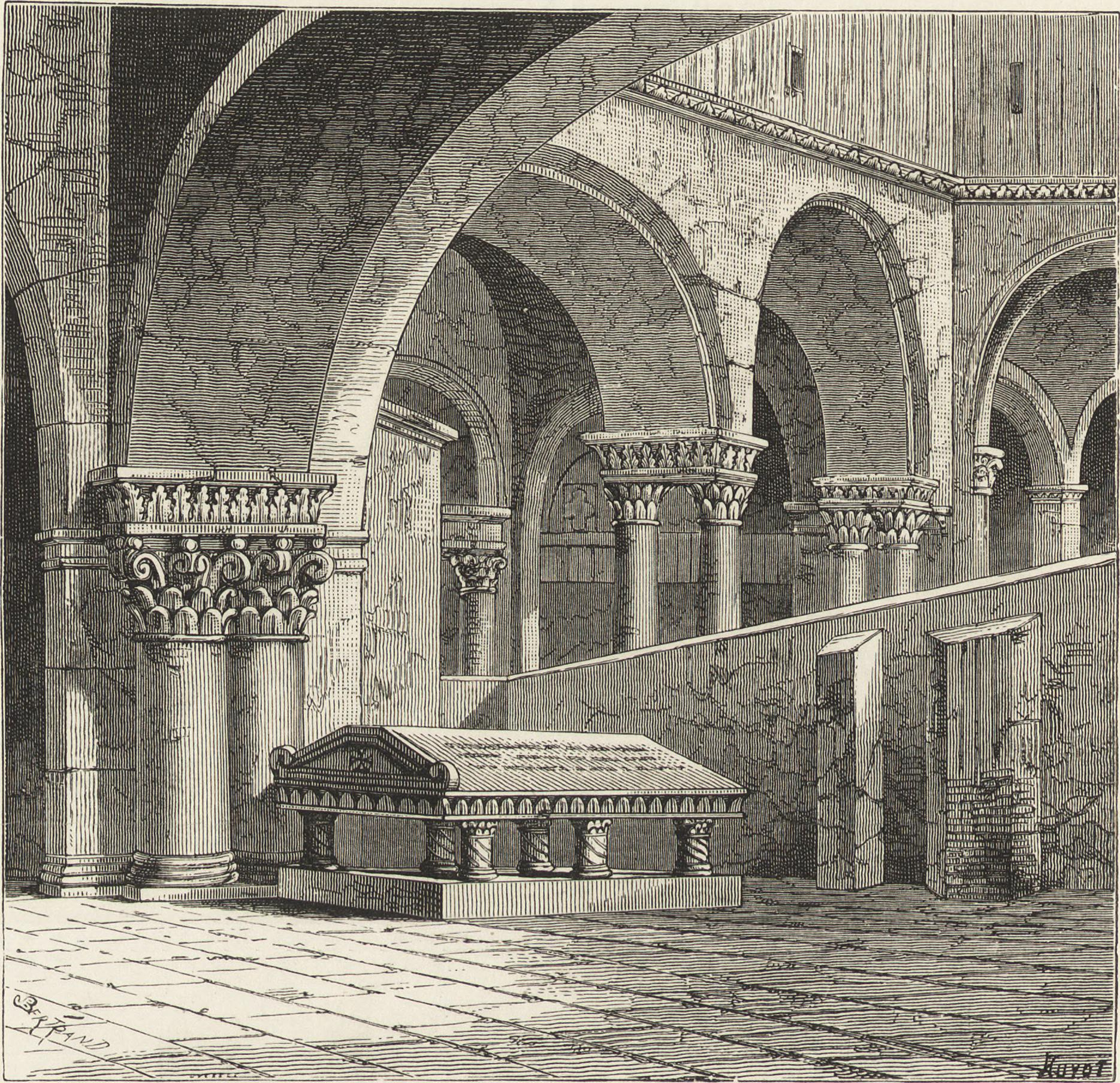
Cenotaph of Godfrey of Bouillon in the Church of the Holy Sepulchre (1870, after a 15th-century woodcut)

The Arab chronicler Ibn al-Qalanisi reported that "In this year [1099], Godfrey, lord of Jerusalem, appeared before the fortified port of 'Akkā [Acre] and made an assault upon it, but was struck by an arrow, which killed him". While this claim is repeated in other Muslim sources, it does not appear in Christian chronicles; Albert of Aix and Ekkehard of Aura suggest Godfrey fell ill while visiting Caesarea in June 1100 and died in Jerusalem on 18 July.

Suggestions he was poisoned are unlikely and it is more probable he died from a disease similar to typhoid. Godfrey never married. (Note: Marjorie Chibnall (Select Documents of the English Lands of the Abbey of Bec, Camden (3rd Ser.) 73 (1951) pp. 25–26) followed earlier writers in suggesting that since the names Godfrey and Geoffrey shared a common origin, Godfrey is identical to the Geoffrey of Boulogne who appears in English records, marrying Beatrice, daughter of Geoffrey de Mandeville and that he left behind in England a son, William de Boulogne (adult by 1106, died c. 1169). However, Alan Murray analyzed the argument in detail and concluded that contemporary documents clearly distinguish between the two names, and as there is no evidence for their identity and traditions of the Crusade indicate Godfrey was unmarried and childless, the two must be considered to have been distinct. Geoffrey, the English landholder, was apparently an illegitimate brother of Godfrey, the Crusader.)

== Legacy ==
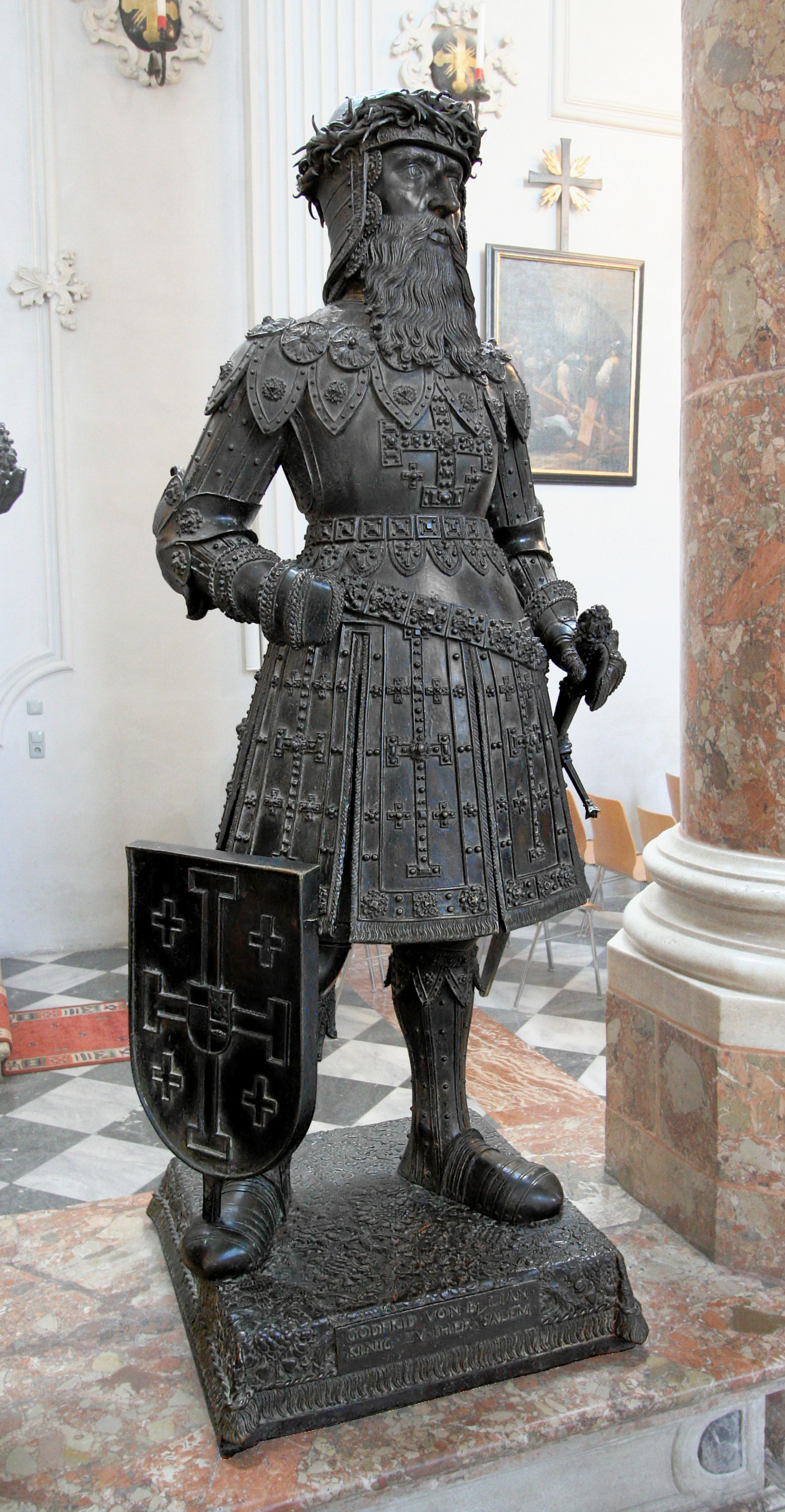
Sixteenth-century bronze statue of Godfrey of Bouillon from the group of heroes surrounding the memorial to Maximilian I, Holy Roman Emperor in the Hofkirche, Innsbruck

According to William of Tyre, the later 12th-century chronicler of the Kingdom of Jerusalem, Godfrey was "tall of stature, not extremely so, but still taller than the average man. He was strong beyond compare, with solidly-built limbs and a stalwart chest. His features were pleasing, his beard and hair of medium blond."

As the first ruler of the Kingdom of Jerusalem and one of those who had taken part in its capture, Godfrey was idealized in later accounts. He was depicted as the military leader of the crusade, a legislator who established the assizes of Jerusalem, and in the early 14th century was selected as one of the Nine Worthies, a pantheon of famous warriors thought to epitomise chivalric ideals. In reality, Godfrey was only one of several leaders of the crusade, which also included Raymond IV of Toulouse, Bohemond of Taranto, Robert of Flanders, Stephen of Blois and Baldwin of Boulogne among others, along with papal legate Adhemar of Montiel, Bishop of Le Puy. Baldwin I of Jerusalem, Godfrey's younger brother, became the first titled king when he succeeded Godfrey in 1100. The assizes were the result of a gradual development.

Godfrey's role in the crusade was described by various authors, including Raymond of Aguilers and Albert of Aix, anonymous author of the Gesta Francorum. In fiction, he was the hero of the "Crusade cycle", a collection of French chansons de geste dealing with the First Crusade, which connected him to the legend of the Knight of the Swan, most famous today as the storyline of Wagner's opera Lohengrin.

By William of Tyre's time later in the 12th century, Godfrey was already a legend among the descendants of the original crusaders. Godfrey was believed to have possessed immense physical strength; it was said that in Cilicia he wrestled a bear and won, and that he once beheaded a camel with one blow of his sword.

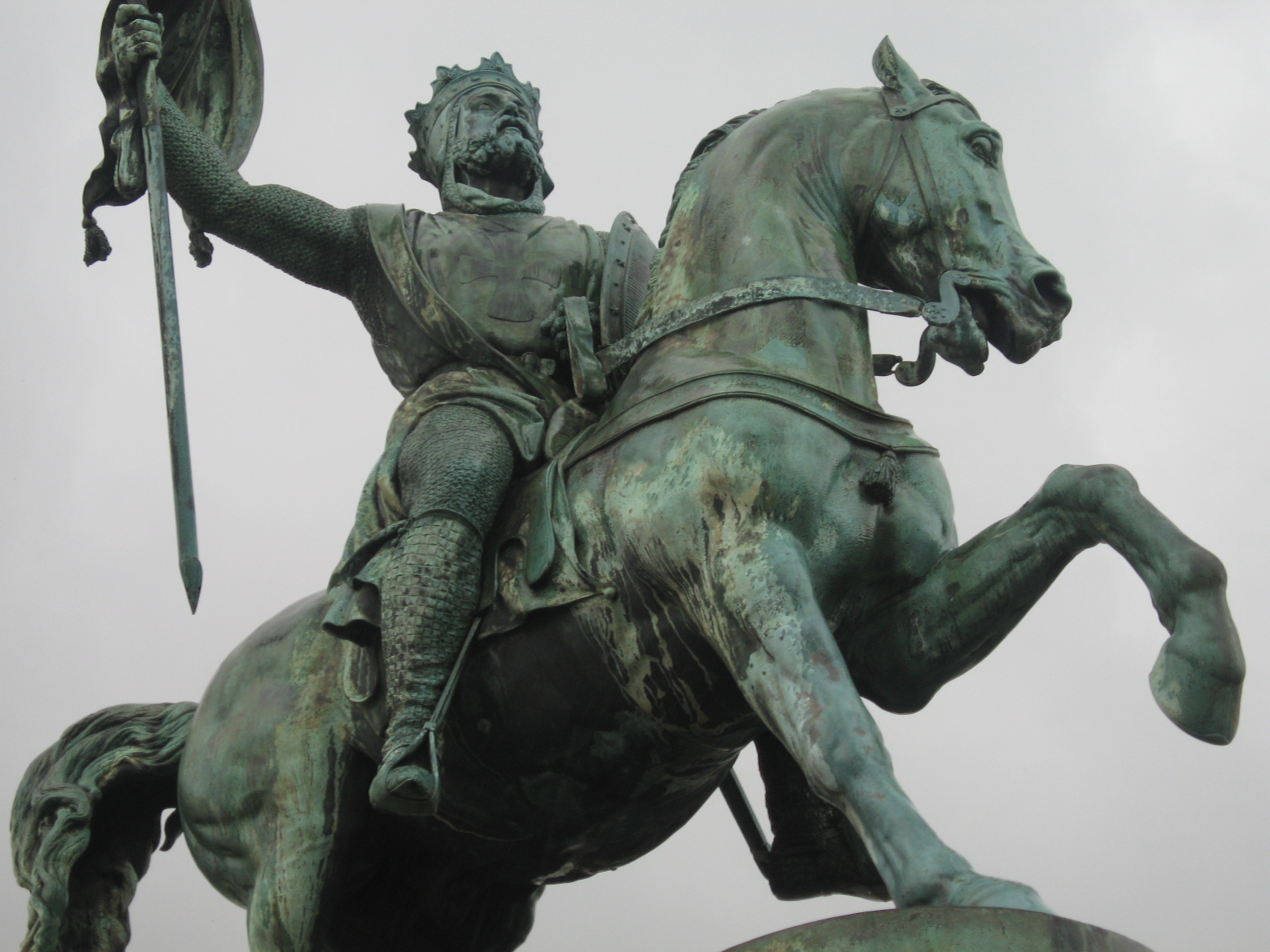
Equestrian statue of Godfrey of Bouillon in Brussels

Since the mid-19th century, an equestrian statue of Godfrey of Bouillon has stood in the centre of the Place Royale/Koningsplein in Brussels, Belgium. It was made by Eugène Simonis, and inaugurated on 24 August 1848.

Godfrey is a key figure in the pseudohistorical theories put forth in the books The Holy Blood and the Holy Grail and The Da Vinci Code.

In 2005, Godfrey came in 17th place in the French language Le plus grand Belge, a public vote of national heroes in Belgium. He did not make the 100 greatest Belgians, as voted by the Dutch speakers in De Grootste Belg (the Greatest Belgian).

=== Literature and music ===
- In the Paradiso segment of his Divine Comedy, Dante Alighieri sees the spirit of Godfrey, together with Roland's, in the Heaven of Mars with the other "warriors of the faith".
- Pierre Desrey's Genealogie de Godefroi de Buillon, completed in 1499, gives a complete history of the Crusades, starting with the birth of the Chevalier au Cygne (Knight of the Swan), the ancestor of Godfrey, and ending after the accession of Philip IV of France (1268–1314). At least six editions are preserved from the 16th century, published between 1504 and 1580.
- Torquato Tasso made Godfrey, as "Goffredo di Buglione", the hero of his epic poem Jerusalem Delivered.
- A Spanish play entitled "La conquista de Jerusalén por Godofre de Bullón" was written in the mid-1580s and known to have been performed in 1586. The play was discovered in the late 1980s by Stefano Arata. It is attributed to and is now widely accepted to have been written by Miguel de Cervantes. It is an adaptation of Tasso's poem and features Godfrey as an ideal of Christian kingship, possibly as a critical parallel to King Philip II of Spain (1556–98).
- Godfrey is depicted in Georg Friedrich Händel's opera Rinaldo (1711) as Tasso's "Goffredo".
- Godfrey also plays key roles in the following novels:
  - The Blue Gonfalon by Margaret Ann Hubbard, which follows Godfrey and his men on their journey to the Holy Land. It is told through the eyes of Bennet, Godfrey's squire.
  - The Iron Lance by Stephen R. Lawhead
  - Godfrey de Bouillon, Defender of the Holy Sepulchre, by Tom Tozer.
- Godfrey's sword is given satirical mention in Mark Twain's The Innocents Abroad (1869).

== Genealogical table ==
Godfrey's relation to the rulers of Lorraine, Boulogne, Tuscany, and Rome

Godfrey I of Verdun
Godfrey II of Lower Lorraine | Gothelo I of Lower Lorraine
Beatrice of Upper Lorraine | Godfrey III of Lower Lorraine | Doda | Gothelo II of Lower Lorraine | Pope Stephen IX | Regelinda
Matilda of Tuscany | Godfrey IV of Lower Lorraine | Ida of Lorraine | Eustace II of Boulogne | Albert III of Namur
Eustace III of Boulogne | Godfrey of Bouillon | Baldwin I of Jerusalem

== Sources ==
- Asbridge, Thomas (2004). The First Crusade: A New History. Oxford. ISBN 0-19-517823-8.
- Asbridge, Thomas (2012). The Crusades: The War for the Holy Land. Oxford University Press. ISBN 978-1849837705.
- Brundage, James A. (1962). "William of Tyre: Godfrey Of Bouillon Becomes "Defender Of The Holy Sepulcher"". The Crusades: A Documentary Survey. Milwaukee: Marquette University Press. pp. 70–73. ISBN 9781258149093.
- Butler, Alban; Burns, Paul (2000). Butler's Lives of the Saints. Continuum International Publishing Group. ISBN 0-86012-253-0.
- Riley-Smith, Jonathan (1998). The First Crusaders, 1095–1131. Cambridge. ISBN 0-521-64603-0.
- Runciman, Steven (1951). A History of the Crusades: Volume 1, The First Crusade and the Foundation of the Kingdom of Jerusalem. Cambridge. ISBN 978-0-521-34770-9. (abridged version: The First Crusade, Cambridge (1980), ISBN 0-521-23255-4)
- Andressohn, John Carl (1947). The Ancestry and Life of Godfrey of Bouillon. Indiana University publications. Social science series, no.5. Indiana University Publications, Social Science Series 5.
- Murray, Alan V., "The Army of Godfrey of Bouillon, 1096–1099: Structure and Dynamics of a Contingent on the First Crusade" (PDF), Revue belge de philologie et d'histoire 70 (2), 1992
- John, Simon (2017). Godfrey of Bouillon: Duke of Lower Lotharingia, Ruler of Latin Jerusalem, c. 1060–1100. Taylor & Francis. ISBN 978-1-317-12630-0.
- Barker, Ernest (1911). "Godfrey of Bouillon". In Chisholm, Hugh (ed.). Encyclopædia Britannica. 12. (11th ed.). Cambridge University Press. pp. 172–173.
- Bréhier, Louis René (1909). "Godfrey of Bouillon". In Catholic Encyclopedia. 6. New York: Robert Appleton Company.
- Edgington, Susan B. (2019). Baldwin I of Jerusalem, 1100-1118. Routledge. ISBN 978-1-4724-3356-5.
- Eidelberg, Schlomo (1996). The Jews and the Crusaders: The Hebrew Chronicles of the First and Second Crusades. KTAV Publishing House, Inc. ISBN 978-0-88125-541-6.
- France, John (1983). "The Election and Title of Godfrey de Bouillon". Canadian Journal of History. 18 (3): 321–329. doi:10.3138/cjh.18.3.321.
- "Godfrey of Bouillon". Internet Medieval Sourcebook: The Crusaders at Constantinople: Collected Accounts.
- Golb, Norman (1998). The Jews in Medieval Normandy: A Social and Intellectual History. Cambridge University Press. ISBN 978-0-521-58032-8.
- Grousset, René (1970). The Epic of the Crusades [L'épopée des croisades]. Translated by Lindsay, Noël. Orion Press. ISBN 9780023297229.
- Holböck, Ferdinand (2002). Married Saints and Blesseds: Through the Centuries. Translated by Miller, Michael J. Ignatius Press. ISBN 0-89870-843-5.
- Ibn al-Qalanisi (1932). The Damascus chronicle of the Crusades. University of London historical series, no. 5. Translated by Gibbs, H.V. Luzac.
- John, Simon (2018). Godfrey of Bouillon. Taylor & Francis Group. ISBN 978-1472458964.
- John, Simon (2022). "The Long shadow of the First Crusade". History Today. 72 (5): 72–83.
- Murray, Alan (1990). "The Title of Godfrey of Bouillon as Ruler of Jerusalem". Collegium Medievale. 3: 163–178.
- Murray, Alan (2000). The Crusader Kingdom of Jerusalem: A Dynastic History 1099–1125. Unit for Prosopographical Research, Linacre College. ISBN 978-1900934039.
- Porter, Whitworth (2013). A History of the Knights of Malta. Cambridge University Press. ISBN 978-1108066228.
- Riley-Smith, Jonathan (1979). "The Title of Godfrey of Bouillon". Bulletin of the Institute of Historical Research. 52 (125): 83–86. doi:10.1111/j.1468-2281.1979.tb02085.x.
- Rubenstein, Jay (2008). "How Carolingian Kingship Trumped Millenniarism at the End of the First Crusade". In Gabriele, Matthew; Stuckey, Jace (eds.). The legend of Charlemagne in the Middle Ages: power, faith, and crusade. Palgrave Macmillan. ISBN 978-0-230-61544-1.

Regnal titles
| New title | Advocate of the Holy Sepulchre; 1099–1100 | Succeeded by Baldwin I |
| Preceded by Conrad II | Duke of Lower Lotharingia; 1087–1100 | Succeeded by Henry |
| Preceded by Godfrey IV | Margrave of Antwerp; 1076–1100 | Succeeded by Henry |
