= Gaumais dialect =

Lorrain dialect

Gaumais
- Native to: Belgium and France
- Region: Gaume
- Native speakers: c. 5,000 (estimate)
- Language family: Indo-European: Italic; Latino-Faliscan; Romance; Italo-Western; Western Romance; Gallo-Romance; Gallo-Rhaetian (possibly); Oïl; Lorrain; Gaumais
- Early forms: Old Latin: Vulgar Latin; Proto-Romance; Old Gallo-Romance; Old French

Official status
- Recognised minority language in: French Community of Belgium

Language codes
- ISO 639-3: –
- Glottolog: None

Gaumais is the regional language, spoken in Gaume, in the south of Belgian Luxembourg and in some border villages such as Ville-Houdlémont and Gorcy. It is a dialect of Lorraine spoken in France near Carignan, Canton of Montmédy and Stenay. In Belgium, Gaumais is recognized as an "endogenous regional language" by the French Community of Belgium.

== Geography ==
Gaumais is not a uniform dialect. Like many regional languages, local variations exist along a dialectal continuum. Gaumais was also fully intelligible in the border regions stretching from Rodange to Stenay, passing through Longuyon. Nevertheless, a southern Gaumais (Virton - Halanzy axis) and a northern Gaumais (Semois - Muno - Habay axis) are considered to exist, even though each village has its own distinct characteristics. In the northwest, the influence of Ardennes, a Champenois dialect, extends as far as Izel.

In general, the Gaumais vocabulary is very close to that used in other dialects of Romance Lorraine.

== History ==
The Lorraine dialect derives from Vulgar Latin, spoken by Romanized populations. Some Celtic words remain, but it is the Latin vocabulary that structures this dialect.

The Gaumais dialect has been influenced by Germanic and has taken many of its features from them, such as the definite article la (la Djeanne) and le (le Djean), but also words like la crombîre (Grundbirne = potato) or la waffe (waffle).

It has gradually incorporated words of other origins such as casavèk (katsavejka = women's blouse), also present in Walloon.

The evolution of the dialect will be marked by a progressive Francization of Gaumais, French already being in the 17th century the official language of religious civil status.

In 1794, when the Gaume region was annexed to France, Henri Grégoire presented his report to the National Convention. Originally from Lorraine, he advocated "eradicating local dialects and universalizing the use of the French language." Regional languages would be systematically stigmatized as worthless.

1815 saw the creation of the United Kingdom of the Netherlands, definitively marking the borders of Gaume. The dialect then evolved very differently on either side of the border. Compulsory and secular schooling in France allowed French to quickly supplant Gaumais as the mother tongue by the end of the 19th century. Belgium followed suit after World War I.

The Gaumais dialect was thus banned in Belgian schools in favor of French, and its use led to repression. The change was rapid but later than in France. This compulsory, French-language education resulted in the absence of transmission of the dialect to the new generation. Through contact with older generations, some Gaumais nevertheless retained a significant knowledge of it and became recognized authors writing in the dialect: Albert Yande, Roger Moreau, Hélène Hanse-Boquel, and Fernand Bonneau. This context helps explain the significant differences in the number of works published in the dialect between the Gaume region and French Lorraine.

The Royal Gaumais Circle of Brussels was founded in 1917. The Academy of Gaumais dialects was created in the early 2000s.

It is recognized by a decree of the French Community of Belgium as an indigenous language on December 24, 1990.

Today, there is no uniform Gaumais or Lorrain dialect like there is for the Basque or Breton.

== Vitality ==
In 2009, after 29 years of work, the Académie du patois gaumais, a group of enthusiasts, published Le Dictionnaire encyclopédique des patois de Gaume.

The local dialect has enjoyed a certain popularity in Belgium in recent years, even though the language is seriously endangered. This is evidenced by the publication of the Gaumais translation of The Little Prince and the performances organized by various theatre groups. An annual mass is held in Gaumais in Tintigny.

The number of speakers, difficult to quantify due to a lack of linguistic surveys in Belgium or France, is steadily declining. Very few speak Gaumais as their first language. However, there are many speakers, often elderly, who have learned the dialect as a second language and can express themselves in it.

A number of words and grammatical rules from the Gaume region have passed into Belgian French. As a result, the inhabitants of Gaume can often understand a sentence in the local dialect without necessarily being able to speak it themselves.

== Literature ==
The oldest works are often undated. At the beginning of the 18th century, the civil registrar of Virton noted a few words of the local dialect in his population registers. It was also at this time that writing became widespread in Gaume, allowing the less privileged social classes to commit oral tradition to paper in their mother tongue.

=== Poetry ===
Gaume literature has made poetry its preferred medium. Authors such as Albert Yande and Léon Gillet produced numerous texts expressing customs, traditions, habits, stories, and fables. The most recent album is Au travé des couteurs du Piwitch' à Djilbépan by Jacky Clausse.

=== Novels and short stories ===
In 2013, Jean-Luc Geoffroy published L'Oscar èt l'Alfred à l'icole, the first novel written in Gaumais. In 2015, he published a bilingual version of El Paul à Nawé, a Christmas tale. That same year, he also contributed to the work Le voyage en Oïlie by translating the Lorraine chapter. Similarly, he published El pètit prince, a translation of the famous novel. In 2019, he published a tale called La Blandine èt l'Corentin.

Other authors have focused on shorter or more diverse works. This is the case of Georges Themelin who published a series of tales, fables and monologues in A l'ombe don vî tillu released in 2004 and its second volume in 2008. He is also the author of The Five Seasons, published in 2019.

=== Dictionaries ===
The first lexicon in Gaumais dates on November 6, 1806 and contains 18 words. It was produced by Marson Grandjean, mayor of Virton, in response to the linguistic survey by Charles Coquebert de Montbret. It is kept in the National Archives in Luxembourg.

The linguist Edouard Liegeois published the very first dictionary in 1897, entitled Lexique du patois gaumet, which was followed by two supplementary volumes. Lucien Roger followed suit in 1907 with his Lexique du patois gaumais de Prouvy-Jamoigne. The former mayor of Saint-Mard, Emond Jacques, also compiled a dictionary of his village. It was never published, but it greatly inspired future works.

The scientific community also turned its attention to the Gaume region during the summer of 1912. Ferdinand Brunot and his student Charles Bruneau traveled along the border to make sound recordings in Florenville, Chiny, Gérouville, and other locations. This was the very first survey in both France and Belgium using a phonograph. Charles Bruneau then undertook a vast survey that resulted in three books covering nine localities in the northwest of the Gaume. In addition, two localities in the canton of Montmédy and ten others in the canton of Carignan were included.

The Linguistic Atlas of Wallonia also focused on the Gaumais dialect from the outset, in order to cover the whole of political Wallonia. Thirty Gaumais localities were surveyed. Jean Lanher's L'Atlas linguistique et ethnographique de la Lorraine romane also conducted research in Saint-Mard.

In 1962, the linguist Jules Massonnet made a survey of the patois of his native village of Chassepierre.

The first comprehensive dictionary was published in 1978. The Saint-Léger Cultural Circle, very active in preserving its local language, published an impressive glossary of all the local words recorded.

As part of the Architecture rurale de Wallonie collection covering Belgian Lorraine, the publisher Mardaga is conducting a survey on a lexicon related to architecture and daily life in the villages of Châtillon, Termes, Watrinsart and Prouvy.

Georges Themelin published in 1999 the very first French-Lorraine/Gaumais dictionary in its Dampicourt variant, a work still unpublished to this day because it is the only one to translate from French into Gaumais. It is also the most important with 20,000 words.

Publications followed one after another, beginning with Alex Michel's dictionary of the Chiny dialect in 2008. In 2009, the Académie des Patois Gaumais published its Dictionnaire encyclopédique des patois de la Gaume (Encyclopedic Dictionary of the Dialects of Gaume). This remarkable work has the merit of presenting and compiling a maximum number of words (16,000 in total) and variants from across the Gaume region. In 2018, Jean-Luc Geoffroy released the Glossaire gaumais-français de Willancourt (Gaumais-French Glossary of Willancourt ) based on the work and texts of the author Nestor Marchal.

In March 2021, Georges Themelin has published the second edition of his French-Lorraine/Gaumais dictionary. At just over 700 pages in A4 format, it is the most substantial dictionary ever produced in Lorraine. It also includes a grammar section.

In December 2021, Jean-Louis Laurent has published a 616-page dictionary of the Gaumais dialect, based on research conducted by the author in Èthe-Belmont and on the work of his predecessors. The preparatory work for the edition received the Wallonia-Brussels Federation's prize for philology in regional languages in 2020.

== Theaters ==
Theatre in the Gaumais region is very old. Its written form, however, is much more recent. Numerous authors have written or adapted plays and performances. This is notably the case with Georges Themelin, Albert Hinck, and Christian Lambinet, who published Les utils aterloyis in 2018, a play using new words to describe modernity.

The Gaume curtain of Saint-Léger was very active until the end of the 20th century and its plays have been preserved thanks to video recording.

In 2019, the most active groups were the workshop of the Académie des Patois Gaumais and Ceux d'Valansart.

== Songs ==
The mistress of Dampicourt is the oldest song preserved to date.

Jean-Claude Watrin is undeniably the best known. Part of his repertoire was written in the Gaumais dialect. Cécile Liégeois released an album with Jean-Marie Liégeois in 2008 and a second one in 2018.

One of the best-known songs from Gaume is "tchantans tchantans".

== Linguistic ==
=== Family ===
Gaumais is an Langues d'oïl, a variant of Lorraine as spoken in Romance Lorraine.

In his work Adieu Patois !, Jean Marie Didier defends the Germanic and Celtic origin of Gaumais, based on a historical and phonological study. According to the author, the influence of the barbarian invasions and Frankish domination on the local language is considerable.

=== Spelling ===
Originally an oral language, Gaumais does not have a truly standardized spelling system. However, contemporary dialect authors use two systems :

- The Feller system, originally created for Walloon and promoted by associations for the promotion of regional languages;
- The concordance with French, which aims to use as much French spelling and grammar as possible in order to facilitate its understanding.

Both systems have their advantages, but the first often receives criticism from local authors who find it unsuitable for certain rules of the Gaumais.
