= Belgicism =

Belgicism may refer to:

- Belgian nationalism, the political ideology which supports the political and economic unity of Belgium
- Belgicism (Dutch), a Dutch word or phrase of Belgian origin, typically never or rarely present in the Dutch spoken in the Netherlands
- Belgicism (French), a French word or phrase of Belgian origin, typically never or rarely present in the French spoken in France
