= Meix-devant-Virton =

Municipality in Wallonia, Belgium

Meix-devant-Virton Minch-duvant-Vèrtan (Gaumais)
- Municipality
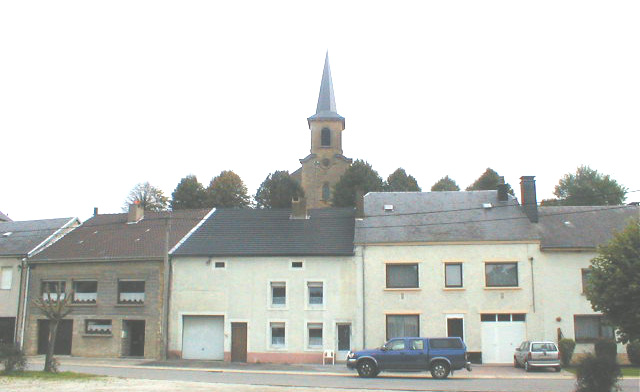

- Flag Coat of arms

- Location of Meix-devant-Virton in Luxembourg province
- Interactive map of Meix-devant-Virton
- Location in Belgium
- Coordinates: 49°36.3′N 05°28.8′E
- Country: Belgium
- Community: French Community
- Region: Wallonia
- Province: Luxembourg
- Arrondissement: Virton

Government
  - Mayor: Pascal François
  - Governing party: Mayeur

Area
  - Total: 54.97 km^{2} (21.22 sq mi)

Population (2018-01-01)
  - Total: 2,831
  - Density: 51.50/km^{2} (133.4/sq mi)
- Postal codes: 6769
- NIS code: 85024
- Area codes: 063
- Website: (in French) www.meix-devant-virton.be

Meix-devant-Virton (French pronunciation: [mɛks dəvɑ̃ viʁtɔ̃], literally Meix before Virton; Gaumais: Minch-duvant-Vèrtan; Walloon: Méch-divant-Vierton) is a municipality of Wallonia located in the province of Luxembourg, Belgium.

On 1 January 2017 the municipality had 2,812 inhabitants. The total area is 54.2 km^{2}, giving a population density of 54 inhabitants per km^{2}.

The municipality consists of the following districts: Gérouville, Meix-devant-Virton, Robelmont, Sommethonne, and Villers-la-Loue. Other population centers include: Belle Vue, Berchiwé, Houdrigny, La Soye and Limes.

== Geography ==
It is located in the Gaume, near Orval Abbey, Avioth and Virton.

railway line 165 Athus-Meuse and the Chevratte, an affluent of the Ton. The national road 88 is linking Florenville and Athus (Aubange) and coming from Dampicourt in the south, it heads west toward Gérouville and the French border.

== Security and safety ==
The municipality is part of the Gaume Police Zone and the Luxembourg safety zone for firemen. The emergency number for those two services is 112.

== See also ==
- List of protected heritage sites in Meix-devant-Virton
