= Madius =

Madius may refer to:

- Madius the Scythian (c. 658/9–625 BCE), Scythian king
- Madius (fl. 986), the founder of the Madi family
- Madius (bishop) (died after 1358), Croatian Catholic prelate
- Madius Tangau (born 1958), Malaysian politician
