= Villers-la-Loue =

Villers-la-Loue Vilé l'Olu (Gaumais)
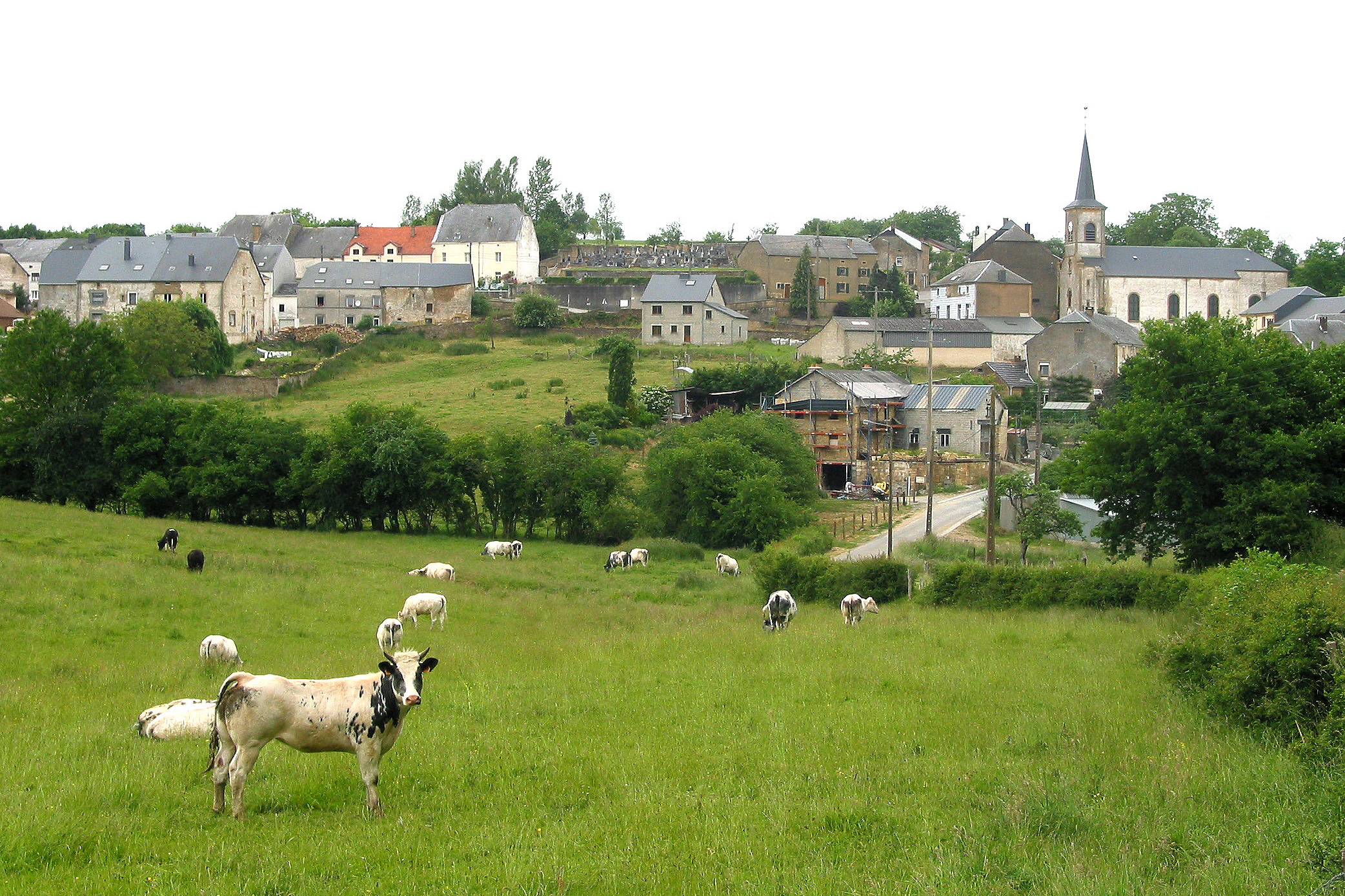
- Villers-la-Loue

- Location within Belgium Location within Europe
- Coordinates: 49°34′29″N 05°28′56″E
- Country: Belgium
- Region: Wallonia
- Province: Luxembourg
- Municipality: Meix-devant-Virton

Villers-la-Loue (Gaumais: Vilé l'Olu) is a village of Wallonia and a district of the municipality of Meix-devant-Virton, located in the province of Luxembourg, Belgium.

The history of the settlement goes back to the time of the Roman Empire, when a Roman villa existed here. In 1225, the village is noted as being subservient to the lord of Cons-la-Grandville and the Abbey of Saint-Hubert. The village church, dedicated to Saint Hubert, was built in 1858. The village consists of several buildings from mainly the 18th and 19th centuries.
