= Lacuisine =

Lacuisine La Keûjine (Gaumais)
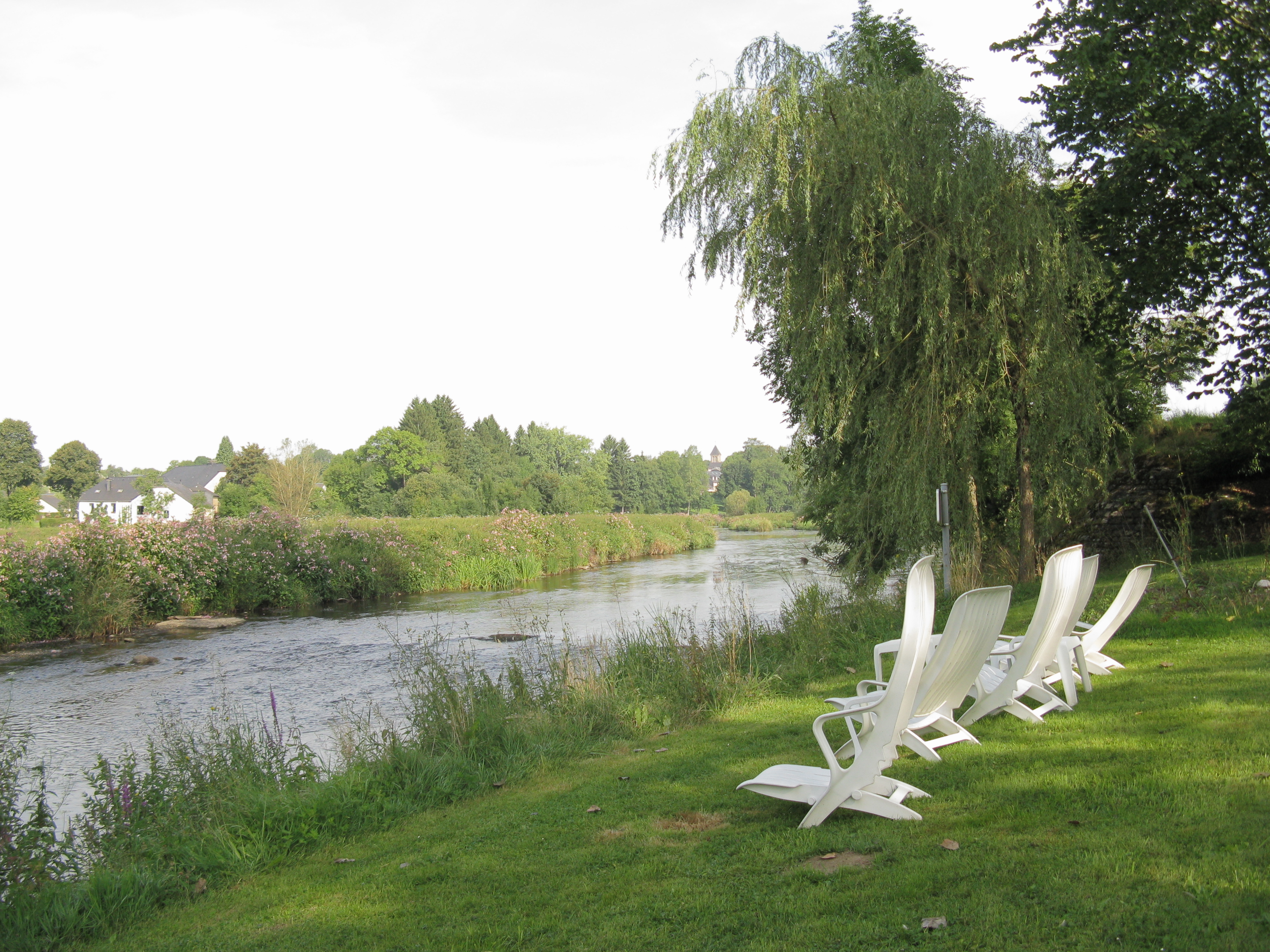
- The Semois river near Lacuisine

- Location within Belgium
- Coordinates: 49.716°N 5.318°E
- Country: Belgium
- Region: Wallonia
- Province: Luxembourg
- Municipality: Florenville
- Postal code: 6821
- Area code: 061

Lacuisine (French pronunciation: [lakɥizin]; Gaumais: La Keûjine) is a village of Wallonia and a district of the municipality of Florenville, located in the province of Luxembourg, Belgium.

Prior to the merger of municipalities in 1977, Lacuisine was an independent municipality. It includes the hamlet of Martué.

== Geography ==
The village is located north of Florenville, on the banks of the Semois river (a tributary of the Meuse).

== Points of interest ==
- Church of Saint Nicholas
- Village watermill
- Roussel forge, which was made famous by Edmond Picard's eponymous novel La Forge Roussel, scènes de la vie judiciaire (1881)
- Les Épioux (nature reserve, ponds, site of a forge in the 17th century)
- Roche Pinco, Roche de l'Écureuil and Roche du Chat, with a view over the Semois

== Culture ==
Each year, inhabitants of Lacuisine and Martué celebrate the end of winter. For a long time, Tordus and Marticots gathered together in front of a huge bonfire. Since 2012, after Candlemas, they hunt the spirits of "cold weather" thanks to a light celebration with which a Légende de l'Ours (bear legend) is associated. Creative activities, dance, tales and concerts give the meeting its tempo. All around the Tafia de l'Ours refreshment area, the light celebration is brightened up with candles put under the windows as well as a release of sky lanterns in the air.
