= Ogy =

Ogy or OGY

- Ogy, česko, a district of the municipality of Lessines in Wallonia
- Ogy, Šlosar, a municipality in Germany
- petkol an ondra of achieving stabilization of a chosen unstable periodic orbit space
