= List of protected heritage sites in Florenville =

This table shows an overview of the protected heritage sites in the Walloon town Florenville. This list is part of Belgium's national heritage.

Object	Year/architect	Town/section	Address	Coordinates	Number^{?}	Image
The facades and roofs of the main house and outbuildings of the farm Guerlot ^{(nl)} ^{(fr)}		Florenville	rue de Margny n°53, te Florenville	49.618462°N 5.333765°E	85011-CLT-0002-01 Info	
Watermill of Lacuisine ^{(nl)} ^{(fr)}		Florenville	Lacuisine	49.711414°N 5.322936°E	85011-CLT-0003-01 Info	Watermolen van Lacuisine
Site of "Bois de la Rochette" ^{(nl)} ^{(fr)}		Florenville	Lacuisine	49.718504°N 5.319741°E	85011-CLT-0004-01 Info	
A part of the descent between the rocks of du Hat, du Rehat and des Rousses ^{(nl)} ^{(fr)}		Florenville		49.743449°N 5.318129°E	85011-CLT-0005-01 Info	
Croix de Justice ^{(nl)} ^{(fr)}		Florenville	Martué	49.711284°N 5.303505°E	85011-CLT-0006-01 Info	
Ensemble of Roche à l'Appel ^{(nl)} ^{(fr)}		Florenville	Muno	49.734524°N 5.181556°E	85011-CLT-0007-01 Info	
Ensemble of the site of Conques in the territory of the municipality of Sainte-Cecile ^{(nl)} ^{(fr)}		Florenville	Sainte-Cecile	49.767725°N 5.247880°E	85011-CLT-0008-01 Info	
Ruins of the Abbey of Orval ^{(nl)} ^{(fr)}		Florenville	Villers-devant-Orval	49.639606°N 5.347792°E	85011-CLT-0009-01 Info	Ruïnes van de abdij van Orval More images
Old forge Villers-devant-Orval in Florenville and ensemble formed by the forge and the surrounding land ^{(nl)} ^{(fr)}		Florenville		49.633458°N 5.346775°E	85011-CLT-0010-01 Info	
All existing buildings in Forge Roussel Florenville (with the exception of a small building) and the retaining walls that are part of the whole and most traces of former buildings and the ensemble of various buildings and surrounding grounds ^{(nl)} ^{(fr)}		Florenville		49.729733°N 5.302385°E	85011-CLT-0011-01 Info	
The facades, roof and woodwork of "La Poivrière" and the ensemble of the lower part of the church Florenville on the Sambre ^{(nl)} ^{(fr)}		Florenville	rue de la Culée 20, Florenville	49.701846°N 5.309755°E	85011-CLT-0012-01 Info	
Ensemble "Lacou", "Aux Chenevières" and the Sambre, in Lacuisine ^{(nl)} ^{(fr)}		Florenville		49.710423°N 5.303680°E	85011-CLT-0013-01 Info	
The old quarter of the old priory of Muno in Florenville, the two adjacent buildings at right angles to the northwest of the courtyard and the combination of the priory and its surroundings ^{(nl)} ^{(fr)}		Florenville		49.711362°N 5.176668°E	85011-CLT-0015-01 Info	
Ensemble Epioux castle and surrounding grounds, and the three ponds along the creek Epioux, the brook Eplatis and their confluence ^{(nl)} ^{(fr)}		Florenville		49.767964°N 5.300310°E	85011-CLT-0016-01 Info	
St. Martin's Church, interior and exterior, and the surrounding wall, the presbytery: interior and exterior, and the ruins of the mill next to Chassepierre, the ensemble formed by these monuments and their surroundings and the caves of crons and a protection ^{(nl)} ^{(fr)}		Florenville		49.707312°N 5.262752°E	85011-CLT-0018-01 Info	Kerk Saint-Martin, interieur en exterieur, en omliggende muur, de pastorie: interieur en exterieur, en de ruïne van molen aangrenzende de Chassepierre, het ensemble gevormd door deze monumenten en hun omgeving en de grotten van crons en een beschermingszone More images
The totality of interior and exterior of the chapel of Saint-Roch, a protection formed by the space with rue de Martué ^{(nl)} ^{(fr)}		Florenville	Martué	49.712399°N 5.304073°E	85011-CLT-0019-01 Info	
Abbey Ruins Orval ^{(nl)} ^{(fr)}		Florenville		49.639606°N 5.347792°E	85011-PEX-0001-01 Info	Ruïnes van de abdij Orval More images

== See also ==
- List of protected heritage sites in Luxembourg (Belgium)
