= Chassepierre =

Chassepierre Tchespire (Gaumais)
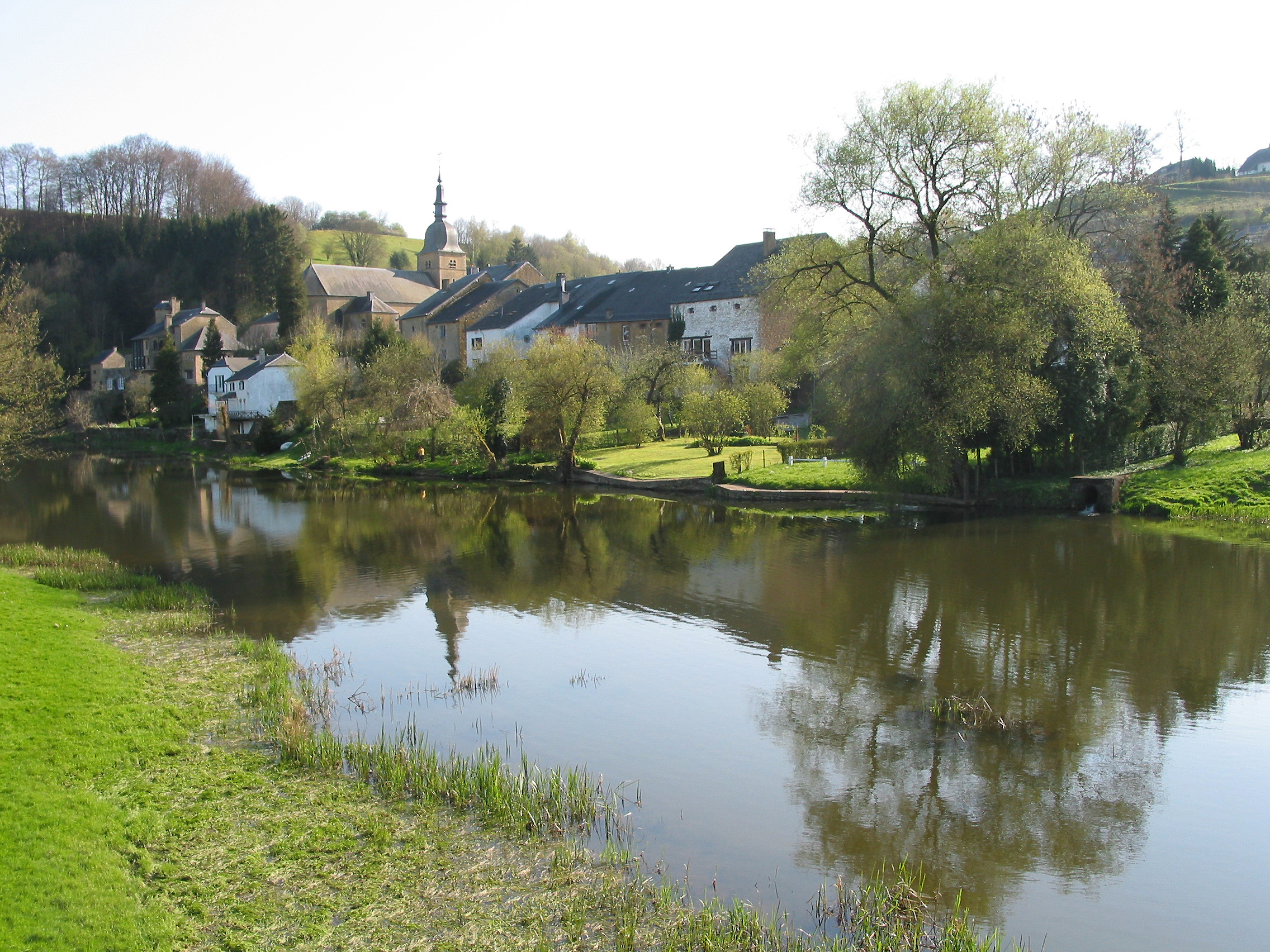
- Chassepierre village and the Semois river

- Location within Belgium Location within Europe
- Coordinates: 49°42′N 05°15.3′E
- Country: Belgium
- Region: Wallonia
- Province: Luxembourg
- Municipality: Florenville

Chassepierre (French pronunciation: [ʃaspjɛʁ]; Gaumais: Tchespire) is a village of Wallonia and a district of the municipality of Florenville, located in the province of Luxembourg, Belgium.

It was a fully-fledged municipality before the 1977 fusion of the Belgian municipalities.

The village is a member of the non-profit organization Les Plus Beaux Villages de Wallonie ("The Most Beautiful Villages of Wallonia").

== Geography ==
The main road N83 between Arlon and Bouillon runs along the west side, above the village. The east side of the village is bordered by the Semois, a tributary of the Meuse. Chassepierre is bounded on the south by the French border.

== Name ==
The name Chassepierre comes from Casa petrea, the Latin for "stone house". Indeed, the houses of the village are mostly made of stones from the 18th and 19th century.

== Architectural heritage ==
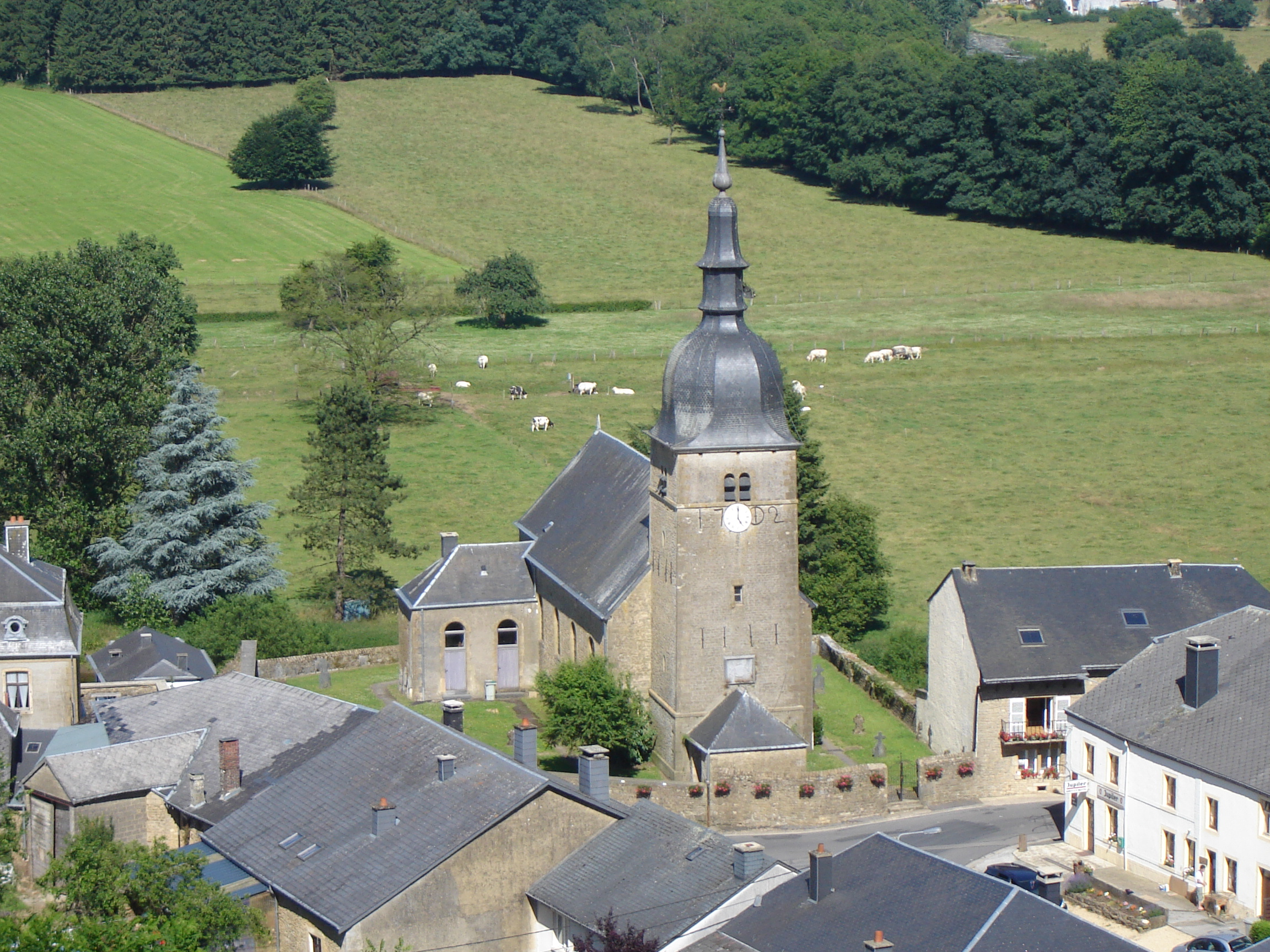
Église Saint-Martin de Chassepierre

The church of Saint Martin was built in 1702.

== Festival ==
The village, considered one of the most charming of Belgium, is mainly famous for its international festival of street art, more commonly known as la Fête des Artistes (literally "the Artists' Festival"). The Chassepierre Festival takes place every year on the second-to-last weekend of August. This festival is the second biggest summer event in Wallonia, after Les Francofolies de Spa, an annual music festival.

The festival currently gathers some 50 professional performance companies with different artists such as actors, musicians, dancers, and acrobats from all over the world. More than 30,000 visitors take part in this festival every year.

=== History ===
In 1972, some artists, the poet Marie Fizaine and the writer Georges Linze among them, decided to organise La fête des Artistes.

In 1973, Alain Schmitz, organiser of social programmes in Florenville, became artistic director of the festival. For its first official edition under the leadership of the village committee, an entire street was dedicated to poets and street artists.

A non-profit organisation, La Fête des Artistes de Chassepierre, was then founded to manage the budgets of the festival that were becoming more important. An inhabitant of the village, Marc Poncin, became president of the association and increasingly the festival spread itself to the whole of the village.

In 2003, the Festival expanded to meadows situated in the other side of the river Semois. It was then possible to cross the river on a temporary footbridge. Ten years later, in 2013, a permanent bridge was built on the pillars of a former tramway bridge.

In 2016, the 43rd edition of the festival took place, gathering more than 50 performance companies from Belgium, but also from The Netherlands, France, Spain, Italy, Austria and Great Britain.

== Bibliography ==
- Alain Renoy, L'invention Chassepierre, 40 ans d'art de rue... 1974-2013, Éditions Weyrich, 2013.
- Chassepierre sain et sauf ?’' (literally: ‘Chassepierre, safe and sound?’), was published with the assistance of the Ministry of French Culture and in cooperation with the Ministry of Spatial Planning as part of the European Year of Architectural Heritage in 1975 in Liège.
