= Sainte-Cécile, Belgium =

Sainte-Cécile Sinte-Cicile (Gaumais)
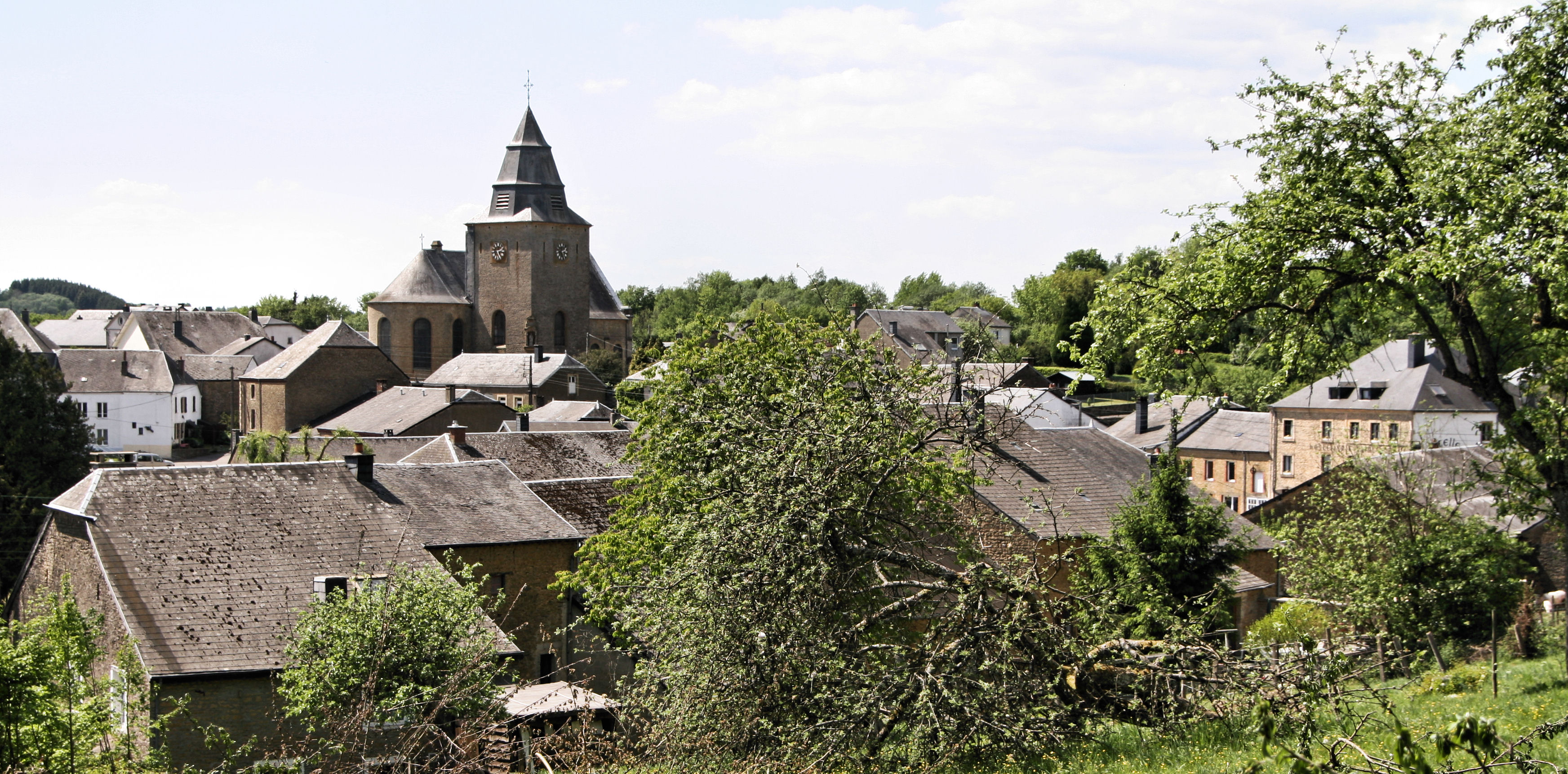
- General view

- Location within Belgium
- Coordinates: 49°43.7′N 05°14.5′E
- Country: Belgium
- Region: Wallonia
- Province: Luxembourg
- Municipality: Florenville
- Postal code: 6820
- Area code: 061

Sainte-Cécile (French pronunciation: [sɛ̃t sesil]; Gaumais: Sinte-Cicile) is a village of Wallonia and a district of the municipality of Florenville, located in the province of Luxembourg, Belgium.

== Geography ==
The village is bordered in the east by the Semois, a tributary to the Meuse river.
