= Ogy-Montoy-Flanville =

- Commune
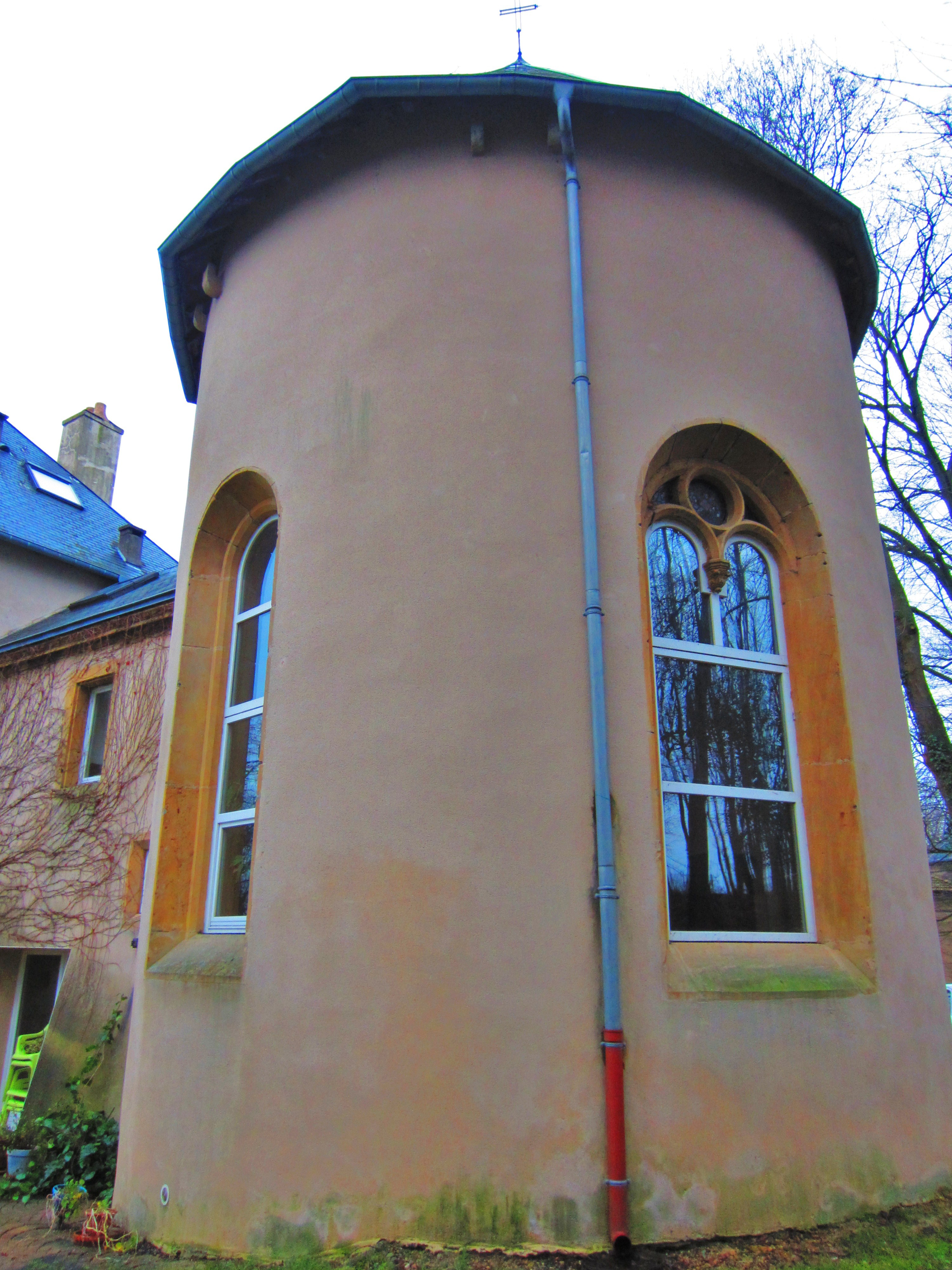
- The chapel in Montoy

- Coat of arms
- Location of Ogy-Montoy-Flanville
- Location within France Location within Grand Est
- Coordinates: 49°07′19″N 6°16′55″E
- Country: France
- Region: Grand Est
- Department: Moselle
- Arrondissement: Metz
- Canton: Le Pays Messin
- Intercommunality: Haut Chemin-Pays de Pange

Government
  - Mayor (2020–2026): Éric Gulino
- Area^{1}: 10.06 km^{2} (3.88 sq mi)
- Population (2023): 1,806
  - Density: 179.5/km^{2} (465.0/sq mi)
- Time zone: UTC+01:00 (CET)
  - Summer (DST): UTC+02:00 (CEST)
- INSEE/Postal code: 57482 /57530, 57645
- ^{1} French Land Register data, which excludes lakes, ponds, glaciers > 1 km^{2} (0.386 sq mi or 247 acres) and river estuaries.

Ogy-Montoy-Flanville (French pronunciation: [ɔʒi mɔ̃twa flɑ̃vil]; German: Ogingen-Montingen-Flanheim) is a commune in the department of Moselle, northeastern France. The municipality was established on 1 January 2017 by merger of the former communes of Montoy-Flanville (the seat) and Ogy.

== See also ==
- Communes of the Moselle department
