= Belgicism (French) =

Word or phrase associated with Belgian French

A belgicism (French: belgicisme) is a word, expression, or turn of phrase that is unique to or associated with Belgian French. Even though the French spoken in Belgium is closer to the European French than Québécois, there are a considerable number of words and phrases that have disappeared from common usage in other Francophone nations that remain common in everyday Belgian speech.

Map of the French-speaking community of Belgium

Certain words used in Belgium that are not used in Standard French are also found in northern France and in Switzerland. For example, chicon (English: Belgian endive) and septante (English: 'seventy', unlike the vigesimal soixante-dix, or 'sixty-ten', used in France.) In these cases, these words are sometimes not classified as being solely belgicisms, since they are used in a broader context.

== Origins of Belgicisms ==
Belgium has three national official languages, and consequently, the French spoken in the Francophone region of Belgium is under considerable influence from the other official Belgian languages. Belgian French is also enriched by loan words from the languages of neighbouring countries. In addition, there's also influence from English loan words that do not exist in Standard French (e.g., the word boiler is not used in Metropolitan French).

Belgian French is also influenced by vocabulary from other regional Romance languages, such as Picard, Walloon, Lorrain and Champenois. Belgicisms directly influenced by Walloon are specifically called Wallonisms.

== Different types of Belgicisms ==
Belgicisms can be of phonetic or semantic nature. The following list provides a comprehensive overview of the types of Belgicisms.

- Phonetic belgicisms, which are not written differently from standard French words, but are pronounced differently:
  - Many Belgians pronounce <ui> /ɥi/ like /wi/, unlike French speakers of French. Most French individuals notice a difference between the two sounds, but many Belgians do not.
  - Another difference in pronunciation stems from how loan words with the letter 'w' are pronounced. Belgian Francophones tend to always pronounce w as /w/ in words like wagon /waɡɔ̃/ whereas in Standard French, this would be pronounced /vaɡɔ̃/, since French Francophones generally pronounce /w/ like /v/. In these cases, however, /ɥi/ and /v/ (the latter in "wagon" but not in "wallon") are supposed to be the norm.
  - The distinction between the nasal vowels /ɛ̃/ and /œ̃/ is upheld, whereas in many regions of France, these two sounds have merged. Thus, although for many French people, brin (stalk) and brun (brown), are homophones, for Belgians they are not.
  - The distinction between long and short vowels is also upheld, which can create minimal pairs in the presence of a mute ending consonant. For instance, "bot" (as in un pied bot, a club foot) and "beau" (beautiful) are not homonyms in Belgian French, creating minimal pairs of sentences like J'ai vu son pied gauche, il était bot (~ I saw she was club-footed on the left) vs. J'ai vu son pied gauche, il était beau (~ I saw she had a beautiful left foot). (In this particular case, "bot" might be heard as [boʔ] or [bo] depending on idiolect or regiolect, vs. "beau" [boː].)
  - Another unusual aspect of Belgian French is the clear difference between the pronunciation of 'ai' and 'ais' at the end of a word. Belgians pronounced the first like an /e/ and the second like an /ɛ/. As a consequence, Belgians rarely confuse the future tense and conditional when writing.
  - Belgian speakers pronounce the final "t" in certain words that some French do not: for example, huit (eight) and vingt (twenty) are pronounced /wɪt/ and /vɛ̃t/ respectively before a pause.
- "Kot" is an example of a common belgicism. A loan from Dutch meaning "shack", but with a French plural "s" (which humorously would translate as "puke" into Dutch).
  Archaic belgicisms that come from the foreign rule over Belgium in the past. Belgium has been occupied by Dutch, English, Spanish, Austrian, French and German powers, all of which have indubitably laid a footprint on Belgian French.
  - Worth mentioning is the use of 'septante' and 'nonante' for 70 and 90 respectively. Although these words are used in Switzerland and in the Democratic Republic of Congo, as well as in Jersey legal French, in the rest of the Francophone world, the ventigesimal 'soixante-dix' and 'quatre-vingt-dix' are used.
  - The term échevin (which existed in Ancien régime French but was replaced in France by adjoint au maire) is still the official Belgian terms for the members of a township's executive power.
- Belgicisms that were manufactured by the Belgian government. Like France and Québec, Belgium too has an administration in place to prescribe language use.
  - Belgium undertook a series of measures to combat linguistic sexism by creating feminine versions of masculine gender occupations. For example, professeur and docteur had no feminine-gender equivalent words, even though many women had these occupations. In March 1989, the Belgian administration prescribed that all jobs would have a grammatically masculine and feminine form (le docteur could be la doctoresse.) This feminization of words has no official equivalent in metropolitan France.
- Belgicisms of Germanic origin such as the word bourgmestre which comes from the Dutch burgemeester and refers to the mayor of a village or township.
- Belgicisms with different meanings from other variants of French. Some words have a different meaning in Belgium from those in other Francophone countries:
  - La cassonade in Belgium is a light or dark brown sugar extracted from beets; in Québec, it is a brown cane sugar.
  - What is called endive in France is called chicorée in Belgium and vice versa. (The chicon is Belgian endive, a chicorée grown in the dark to keep it white rather than green.)
  - Outre-Quiévrain is used to refer to Belgium by the French, and to France by the Belgians; Quiévrain is the border crossing point on the old main Paris-Brussels railway line.
- Words for new concepts created separately in Belgium and in France. For instance, Belgian logopède vs. French orthophoniste, independently formed on different Greek roots to mean "a speech therapist". Similarly, Belgian un parastatal vs. French un organisme semi-public.
- Belgicisms different in grammar, not vocabulary. Some Belgicisms are unfamiliar to speakers of other French dialects due to their syntax, rather than lexicon.
  - Belgians use the verb savoir (to know) for inanimate objects. For instance, a Belgian may say "Ma voiture ne sait pas démarrer" (lit. 'My car doesn't know how to start') for a car that is malfunctioning. Standard French speakers may use “Ma voiture ne peut pas démarrer” (lit. 'My car cannot start').

== Examples ==
| Belgicism | Flemish | Metropolitan French | English |
|---|---|---|---|
| à tantôt | tot later | à tout à l'heure | see you later |
| aller à la toilette | naar het toilet gaan | aller aux toilettes | to go to the toilet |
| s'astruquer | verslikken | s'étrangler | to choke drinking something |
| au matin | deze morgen | ce matin | this morning |
| auto-scooter | botsauto | auto-tamponneuse | bumper car |
| brosser un cours | brossen, spijbelen | sécher un cours | to skip class |
| patates | aardappelen, patatten | pommes de terre | potatoes |
| canule | slechte voetballer | chèvre | terrible football player |
| carabistouilles | stommigheden | bêtises | antics, silly things |
| carrousel | draaimolen, carrousel | manège forain | carrousel |
| chicon | witloof | endive | chicory, Belgian endive |
| co-koter | samenwonen | partager un logement étudiant | to have a roommate (usually students) |
| couque | koek | viennoiserie | sweet bun |
| dikkenek | dikkenek (literally: fat neck) | vantard | braggart |
| divan | sofa, zetel | canapé | sofa |
| douf ("Il fait douf!") | heet | chaleur étouffante ("il fait très chaud") | asphyxiating heat |
| drache | stortregen | averse | heavy rain |
| endéans | binnen | dans l'intervalle de (durée, distance) | within a time interval, distance |
| écolage | opleiding | apprentissage | training |
| farde | binder | classeur | binder |
| GSM | gsm | téléphone portable | mobile/cell phone |
| kot | kot | petit studio d'étudiant | digs; student residence |
| (avoir des) crolles | krullen hebben | (avoir les) cheveux bouclés | (to have) curly hair |
| lait russe ("Russian milk") | koffie verkeerd | café renversé, café au lait | café au lait, latte |
| nonante | negentig | quatre-vingt-dix | ninety |
| septante | zeventig | soixante-dix | seventy |
| spéce | speciaal, ongewoon | spécial, bizarre | special; unusual |
| tapis-plein | tapis-plein | moquette | carpet |
| toquer | "nen toek geven", kloppen | frapper à la porte | to knock |
| torchon | dweil | serpillière | floorcloth |
| essui | badhanddoek | serviette de bain | bath towel |
| volle gaz | volle gas | rapidement | quickly (full steam ahead) |

== See also ==
- Belgian French
- Flemish dialects
- Walloon language
- Varieties of French
