= Jean de Huy =

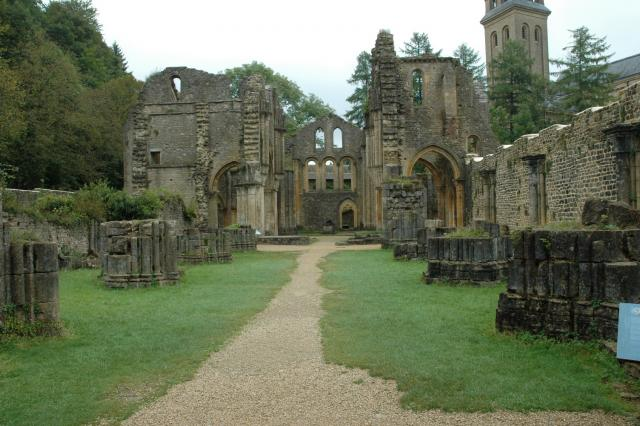
Ruins of Orval Abbey, where Jean served as abbot and was buried

Jean de Huy O.Cist. (Latin: Joannes de Hoio; died after July 1317) was a Cistercian monk who served as abbot of Orval Abbey in present-day Belgium from approximately 1311 to 1317 and subsequently as abbot of Trois-Fontaines Abbey in Champagne, present-day France. During his abbacy, Orval faced serious financial difficulties, which Jean tried to resolve by selling monastic revenues and taking other measures.

Later ecclesiastical historians also identified Jean as a bishop associated with the Diocese of Duvno and an auxiliary bishop of the Archdiocese of Trier. However, contemporary documents have not established his episcopal appointment. Some historians associated his career with that of John of Léoncel, who was appointed Bishop of Duvno in 1345, while others treated them as separate individuals. Jean's date of death remains disputed, although historical accounts place his burial in the choir of Orval Abbey.

== Abbacy ==
Jean, whose designation derives from the town of Huy, probably became abbot of Orval in 1311, succeeding Nicolas de Trèves. Although surviving documents identify him as abbot only between 1314 and 1317, the monastery's traditional succession places the beginning of his abbacy in 1311.

His administration coincided with a financial crisis caused partly by earlier land purchases and tithe rights, and by expenses associated with the monastery's buildings. In June 1313, inhabitants of Beaumont and Mouzon plundered and burned the monastic farms of Blanchampagne and Presle, killing a lay brother. The Cistercian General Chapter subsequently instructed the abbot of Trois-Fontaines to arrange Orval's financial recovery and considered dispersing its monks among other monasteries.

Jean sold several revenue sources to Clairefontaine Abbey. On 26 July 1314, he transferred the tithes of Vieux-Virton, Bleid, Gomery, Ethe, Latour, Rulles and Marbehan, together with a rye rent associated with Meix-devant-Virton, in exchange for 580 livres tournois. On 11 December 1314, he also granted Clairefontaine the patronage of churches associated with those properties. A further sale of a spelt rent followed on 28 February 1315. The Cistercian General Chapter approved the transactions after an examination of Orval's finances by the abbots of Trois-Fontaines, La Chalade and Châtillon.

In March 1317, Jean acquired part of the tithe of Iré-le-Pré. In July, he transferred a house at Péronsart to the Abbey of Saint-Vanne in Verdun in exchange for release from an annual rye rent. These measures helped alleviate the monastery's financial difficulties. Later in 1317, Jean became abbot of Trois-Fontaines, Orval's mother abbey, and was succeeded at Orval by Jacques de Mouzon.

Some historical lists attribute a second abbacy at Orval to Jean after Jacques de Mouzon's death in 1325. However, the Monasticon belge identifies the subsequent abbot as Jean de Chiny, who appears in documents from 1326 and 1327. Other monastic records identify Jean de Huy instead, leaving the attribution disputed.

== Episcopal career ==
Jean's alleged episcopal career is known mainly from later ecclesiastical histories. In his Hierarchia catholica medii aevi, Konrad Eubel included Joannes de Hoio among the bishops associated with Duvno and the auxiliary bishops of Trier.

The historian Dominik Mandić cited an epitaph reproduced by Jean Bertholet which identified Jean as abbot of Orval and Trois-Fontaines and bore the title Episcopus Delmetensis. Mandić interpreted the episcopal title as referring to Duvno, but found no documents in the Roman archives confirming Jean's appointment or activities there. He therefore considered it uncertain whether Jean had been a diocesan bishop or had merely held an episcopal title while serving elsewhere.

Ante Škegro likewise considered the episcopal title recorded in the epitaph authentic, but acknowledged that the circumstances of Jean's appointment remained unknown. Since the Diocese of Duvno had probably been established between 1298 and 1311, Škegro did not exclude the possibility that Jean was its first bishop. However, he could not establish whether Jean had resided in the diocese or exercised jurisdiction there.

== Disputed identification with John of Léoncel ==
The historian Charles Grégoire proposed that Jean had been irregularly appointed and consecrated bishop of a see he identified as Konavlje in Dalmatia around 1324, suspended from episcopal functions by Pope John XXII in July 1325 and ordered to return to monastic life at Trois-Fontaines. According to this reconstruction, Pope Clement VI rehabilitated him in 1345 and appointed him Bishop of Duvno. The authors of the Monasticon belge, however, questioned this identification because the published papal records they consulted did not confirm the proposed sequence of events.

Mandić distinguished Jean de Huy from John of Léoncel, the Cistercian monk whom he identified as the documented recipient of Clement VI's appointment to Duvno on 20 June 1345. According to the papal account reproduced by Mandić, John of Léoncel belonged to a monastery in the Diocese of Valence and had been irregularly consecrated bishop of Cunavia in present-day Albania by Andrew, Archbishop of Bar. After his suspension in 1325, John of Léoncel returned to his monastery and later entered the Benedictine Abbey of Île Barbe near Lyon.

The bull of 20 June 1345, preserved in Registra Vaticana, volume 169, folio 44v, recounts John of Léoncel's earlier consecration, suspension and monastic transfers. Mandić considered this evidence sufficient to distinguish him from Jean de Huy. Škegro likewise treated the two as separate individuals, although he regarded Jean de Huy's precise episcopal status as unresolved.

In contrast, Paul-Christian Grégoire, drawing on his brother Charles's research, maintained that Jean de Huy had been restored to episcopal office and probably spent his final years as an auxiliary bishop of Trier. He believed Jean died at Orval before 1355.

== Death and burial ==
Jean's exact date of death remains uncertain. An epitaph reproduced by Bertholet and cited by Mandić gives the year 1317, while Eubel dated his death to 24 March of that year. However, the Monasticon belge records Jean conducting transactions for Orval as late as July 1317, which conflicts with the more precise date given by Eubel.

A reconstruction of the abbots' epitaphs by J. L. Hollenfeltz, discussed in the Monasticon belge, instead gives 1327 as Jean's death year. Paul-Christian Grégoire placed his death before 1355 based on the proposed later episcopal career. These conflicting chronologies do not establish a definite death date.

Jean was buried in the choir of Orval Abbey, where historical transcriptions of his funerary inscription preserved the disputed episcopal title.

== Footnotes ==
Catholic Church titles
Preceded by Nicolas de Trèves	Abbot of Orval c. 1311–1317	Succeeded by Jacques de Mouzon
