= Belgian French =

Variety of French language

- French of Belgium
- français de Belgique (French)
- Native to: Belgium
- Region: Wallonia; Brussels
- Ethnicity: Walloons / Brusselians
- Language family: Indo-European: Italic; Latino-Faliscan; Romance; Italo-Western; Western Romance; Gallo-Romance; Oïl; French; Belgian French
- Early forms: Old Latin: Vulgar Latin; Proto-Romance; Old Gallo-Romance; Old French
- Dialects: Congolese French; Rwandan French; Burundian French
- Writing system: Latin (French alphabet); French Braille

Official status
- Official language in: Belgium; Burundi; Democratic Republic of the Congo; Rwanda
- Regulated by: Académie royale de langue et de littérature françaises de Belgique

Language codes
- ISO 639-3: –
- Linguasphere: 51-AAA-i
- IETF: fr-BE

Linguistic map of Belgium. Officially Francophone areas in red.

Belgian French (French: français de Belgique) is the variety of French spoken mainly among the French Community of Belgium, alongside related Oïl languages of the region such as Walloon, Picard, Champenois, and Lorrain (Gaumais). The French language spoken in Belgium differs very little from that of France or Switzerland. It is characterized by the use of some terms that are considered archaic in France, as well as loanwords from languages such as Walloon, Picard, and Belgian Dutch.

French is one of the three official languages of Belgium, along with Dutch and German. It is spoken natively by around 40% of the population, primarily in the regions of Wallonia and Brussels. The French spoken in the Democratic Republic of the Congo, Rwanda, and Burundi is largely based on Belgian French, as all three countries are former colonies of Belgium.

== Influences ==
While a number of Oïl languages have traditionally been spoken in different areas of Wallonia, French emerged as the regional language of literature in the 13th century. This was a result of heavy French cultural influence on the region over the past few centuries. The diversity of local languages influenced French in Wallonia, with words from Walloon, Picard, Champenois and Lorrain making their way into the local variant. Until the 20th century, Walloon was the majority language of Wallonia, and most speakers were bilingual in French and Walloon.

While the French spoken in Wallonia was influenced by local languages, the variant spoken in Brussels was influenced by Dutch, specifically the local Brabantian dialect. The population of the city, situated in the region of Flanders, originally was largely Dutch-speaking, aside from a French-speaking aristocracy. A gradual Francisation of the population began in the 19th century and continued throughout the 20th century, as French emerged as the dominant language of the city. The local dialect of Brussels includes some loanwords from Dutch, as well as expressions that have been translated into French.

== Phonology ==
There are a few consistent phonological differences between the French in France and Belgium but usually no more than the differences between regional dialects within France (or the ones that exist between the English of Toronto and Vancouver (Canada) for instance), which might even be nonexistent. Regional accents however, can vary from city to city (the Liège accent being an example). However, on the whole, accents may vary more according to one's social class and education.

Oral
	Front		Central	Back
	unrounded	rounded	Central	Back
Close	i / iː	y / yː		u / uː
Close-mid	e / eː	øː	ə	o / oː
Open-mid	ɛ / ɛː	œ	ə	ɔ
Open	a / aː			

Nasal
	Front		Back
	unrounded	rounded	Back
Mid			õ
Open	æ̃	œ̃	ɑ̃

While stronger accents have been more typical of the working class, they have become much less pronounced since World War I and the widespread use of television, which has helped to standardise accents and the types of words used by speakers. Belgian speakers are taught the pronunciation of standard Belgian French in schools. The following differences vary by speaker, according to level of education, age and native region:

- The lack of phonemic /ɥ/. For which one must carefully distinguish two cases if standard French is taken as starting point :
  - Standard French [ɥ] from the synaeresis of /y/ which do not change as in metropolitan accents (hence often not transcribed separately), e.g. muette (mute f.) /myɛt/ [my.ɛt]
    - For "longer" (Note: Three or more syllables) words though, synaeresis may apply and surface [ɥ] may appear. For example, habituel (usual) phonetically /abityɛl/ has been found to be consistently pronounced as [abitɥɛl].
  - Traditional French's diphthongs /ɥi, ɥɛ̃/ which are replaced by [wi, wæ̃]. Thus, enfuir (to run away) and enfouir (to bury) are pronounced [ɑ̃fwiːʁ], unlike in France and Quebec.
- The nasal vowels are pronounced like in France: /ɑ̃/ stays [ɑ̃], /ɛ̃/ → [æ̃], /ɔ̃/ → [õ], but the distinction between the nasal vowels /ɛ̃/ and /œ̃/ has been retained in Belgium, but in many regions of France such as Paris, the two have merged. For example, in Belgium, brin (stalk) and brun (brown) are still pronounced differently, like in Quebec but unlike in Paris.
- The distinction between the vowels /o/ and /ɔ/ has been maintained in final open syllables. For example, peau (skin) and pot (jar) are still pronounced differently, unlike in France and Quebec.
- The distinction between long and short do not line up with Quebec French; all the circumflexes are pronounced:
  - The phonemes /ɛ/ and /ɛː/ is still present in Belgium, but they have merged in Paris and Southern France: mettre (put) [mɛtʁ̥] and maître (master) [mɛːtʁ̥]. Otherwise, many words are pronounced with a long /ɛː/ even if there is no circumflex (just as in Québec): haine [ɛːn] and reine [ʁɛːn], etc. Or short even when followed by historical /s/ (when Québecois have a long vowel): presse [pʁ̥ɛs], etc.
    - In working class speech and fixed idiosyncrasies /ɛː/ may merge with /eː/, e.g. taie (d'oreiller) ((pillow)case) is often pronounced as [teː]
  - The phonemes /i/ and /iː/ are still distinct in Belgium, unlike in France and Quebec: il [il] vs. île [iːl].
  - The phonemes /y/ and /yː/ are still distinct in Belgium, unlike in France and Quebec: chute [ʃyt] vs. flûte [flyːt].
  - The phonemes /u/ and /uː/ are still distinct in Belgium, unlike in France and Quebec: toute [tut] vs. croûte [kʁ̥uːt].
  - The phonemes /ɔ/ and /oː/ are still distinct, unlike in Southern France: cote [kɔt] vs. côte [koːt]
  - The phonemes /œ/ and /øː/ are still distinct, unlike in Southern France: jeune [ʒœn] vs. jeûne [ʒøːn].
  - Long vowels are also used in tonic -final- open syllables where historically a schwa stood : ⟨ie⟩ [iː]#, ⟨ue⟩ [yː]#, ⟨ée⟩, ⟨aie⟩ [eː]#, (⟨aie⟩ [ɛː]#), ⟨eue⟩ [øː]#, ⟨oue⟩ [uː]#, ⟨oie⟩ [waː]#. As a result, almost all feminine adjectives have phonetically distinct forms from their masculine counterparts.
  - In closed syllables, the vowels /a/ and /ɑ/ are still distinct in Belgium, but /ɑ/ is only pronounced as a lengthened version of /a/, unlike in Paris and Southern France: pâte (paste) [paːt].
- The letter "w" is almost always pronounced as /w/, like in English, which also approximates the Flemish "w". In France and Quebec, in many words, "w" is pronounced /v/, as in German. For example, the word wagon (train car) is pronounced /vaɡɔ̃/ in France and Quebec, but /waɡɔ̃/ in Belgium.
- Some speakers devoice final stops, in which case d is pronounced like t, b is pronounced like p and g is pronounced like k. In combination with the dropping of consonants (/l, ʁ/) in final consonant clusters, this leads to pronunciations such as grande [ɡʁɑ̃ːt] instead of [ɡʁɑ̃ːd], table [taːp] instead of [tabl], and tigre [tiːk] instead of [tiːɡʁ].
- For some speakers, the short high vowels /i, y, u/ are realised as lax (mostly in closed syllables): [ɪ, ʏ, ʊ].

Certain accents, such as in certain cities (notably Brussels and Liège) and those of speakers who are older and particularly less educated, are farther from the pronunciation of France. For example, in the dialect in and around Liège, especially for older speakers, the letter "h" is pronounced in certain positions. It is always silent, however, in Standard French. That dialect is known also for its slow, slightly "singing" intonation, a trait that is even stronger towards the east, in the Verviers area.

== Vocabulary ==
Words unique to Belgian French are called "Belgicisms" (French: belgicismes). (This term is also used to refer to Dutch words used in Belgium but not in the Netherlands.) In general, the Francophone and educated speakers understand the meaning and use of words in Standard French, and they may also use Standard French if they speak with non-Belgians who speak in Standard French, as their accent hints. Overall, the lexical differences between Standard French and Belgian French are minor. They could be compared to the differences that might exist between two speakers of American English living in different parts of the United States; they are considerably less than the differences which exist between varieties of English within the United Kingdom.

Furthermore, the same speakers would often be well aware of the differences and might even be able to "standardise" their language or use each other's words to avoid confusion. Even so, there are too many forms to try to form any complete list in this article. However, some of the better-known usages include the following:

- The use of septante for "seventy" and nonante for "ninety", in contrast to Standard French soixante-dix (literally "sixty-ten") and quatre-vingt-dix ("four-twenty-ten"). Those former words occur also in Swiss French. Unlike the Swiss, however, Belgians never use huitante for quatre-vingts ("four twenties"). Although they are considered Belgian and Swiss words, septante and nonante were common in France until around the 16th century, when the newer forms began to dominate.
- The words for meals vary, as described in the table below. The usage in Belgian, Swiss and Canadian French accords with the etymology: déjeuner comes from a verb meaning "to break the fast". In France, however, breakfast is rendered by petit déjeuner. Souper is used in France to refer instead to a meal taken around midnight.

English	Belgian, Swiss, and Canadian French	Standard French
breakfast	déjeuner/petit déjeuner	petit déjeuner
lunch/dinner	dîner	déjeuner
dinner/supper	souper	dîner
late-evening meal/supper	N/A	souper

- Many Walloon words and expressions have crept into Belgian French, especially in the eastern regions of Wallonia:
  - Qu'à torate (similar to à bientôt, "see you soon")
  - pèkèt ("jenever")
  - barakî (similar to the word chav in British English).
  - Qué novel ? (similar to quoi de neuf ?, "what's up ?")
- Germanic influences are also visible:
  - Crolle ("curl") reflects the Brabantic pronunciation of the Dutch word krul. ("Boucle" is used in France.)
  - S'il vous plaît is used to mean "here" (when someone is handed something) as well as "please", but in France, the meaning is limited to "please", "voilà" is used for "here". That is comparable to the use of alstublieft in Dutch.
  - Dringuelle (Standard French "pourboire"), "tip", from the Dutch word drinkgeld, but it is less commonly used in Brussels.
  - Kot (student room in a dormitory) from Belgian Dutch "kot".
  - Ring (ring road) from Dutch "ring". In Standard French, the term is "ceinture périphérique" or "périph'".
  - Savoir (to know) is often used in the place of pouvoir (to be able [to]). It was quite common, however, in older forms of French.
  - Blinquer (to shine), instead of briller, has a Germanic origin and passed through Walloon.
  - Bourgmestre (mayor), instead of maire, from the Dutch word burgemeester.

== Grammar ==
The grammar of Belgian French is usually the same as that of France, but Germanic influences can be seen in the following differences:

- Ça me goûte, Standard French "ça me plaît", "I like it" (only for food), is a calque of Dutch Dat smaakt (similar to Spanish 'me gusta').
- Tu viens avec ?, Standard French "Tu m'accompagnes?", literally "Are you coming with?" (meaning "Are you coming with me?"), is a calque of Dutch Kom je mee?.
- Ça tire ici (used mostly in Brussels), for Standard French "Il y a un courant d'air") "There is a draught" is a calque of the Belgian Dutch Het trekt hier (Netherlands Dutch Het tocht hier).
- Phrases like pour + V : "Passe-moi un bic pour écrire" (Standard French "Donne-moi un stylo afin que je puisse écrire") "Give me a pen, so that I can write / for me to write" is a grammatical structure found in Dutch ("om te +V").
- "Qu'est-ce que c'est que ça pour un animal ?" Standard French "Qu'est-ce que c'est comme animal ?" / "Quelle sorte d'animal c'est ?", "What kind of animal is this?" (literally, "What is that for an animal?"), Dutch "Wat is dat voor (een) dier?" or "Wat voor dier is dat?"
- The use of une fois ("once") in mid-sentence, especially in Brussels, is a direct translation of Dutch "eens". French people who want to imitate the Belgian accent often use "une fois" at the end of the sentences, often wrongly: "Viens une fois ici", literally from the Dutch "Kom eens hier" ("Come once here"). The English equivalent would be "Could you come here?" or "Why don't you come here?"
- Jouer poker ("Standard French "Jouer au poker") "Playing poker" is influenced by the Dutch Poker spelen.

== See also ==
- Wallonia-Brussels Federation
- Walloon, a Romance language related to French, spoken in Belgium

== Bibliography ==
- Hambye, Philippe; Simon, Anne-Catherine (2009). "La prononciation du français en Belgique". In Lavoisier (ed.). Phonologie, variation et accents du français (in French). Paris: HERMES. pp. 95–130. hdl:2078.1/83397. ISBN 978-2-7462-2107-9.
- Pohl, Jacques (1983). Henriette Walter (ed.). "Quelques caractéristiques de la phonologie du français parlé en Belgique". Langue française (in French). 60. Paris: Armand Colin: 30–41. doi:10.3406/lfr. ISSN 0023-8368.
