= Florenville =

City in Wallonia, Belgium

Coordinates: 49°41.9′N 5°18.6′E

Florenville Floravile
- City and municipality
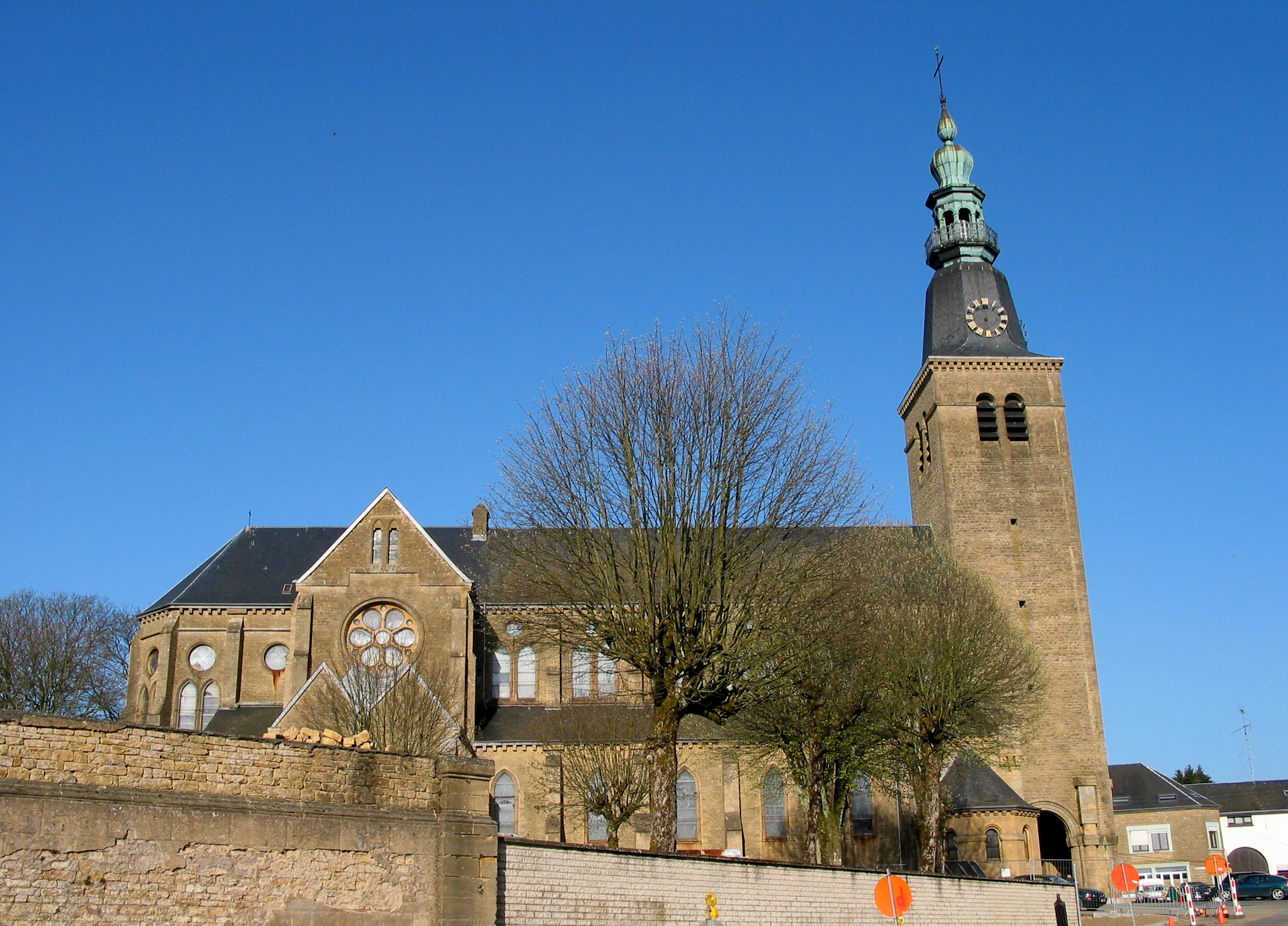
- A church in Florenville

- Seal

- Location of Florenville in Luxembourg province
- Country: Belgium
- Region: Wallonia
- Province: Luxembourg
- Arrondissement: Virton

Area
  - Total: 148.1 km^{2} (57.2 sq mi)

Population (2021)
  - Total: 5,687
- Postal code: 6820 to 6824
- Telephone: 061
- Website: www.florenville.be

Florenville (French pronunciation: [flɔʁɑ̃vil]; Gaumais: Floravile) is a city and municipality in the province of Luxembourg, Wallonia, Belgium. It is located in the southwest part of the country bordering France, on the banks of the Semois river. Spread across an area of 148.1 km^{2} (57.2 sq mi), the municipality incorporates seven districts. In 2021, the municipality had a population of 5,687 inhabitants.

== History ==
Archeological excavations in the region have yielded artifacts dating back to at least 15th century BCE. During the rule of the Roman Empire, it was part of the route between Reims and Trier, built in 45 CE by Emperor Claudius. Around 1070 CE, a group of Benedictine monks from Calabria settled in the region at the invitation of Arnold I, Count of Chiny, and Conrad I, Count of Luxembourg, and began construction of a church and monastery, which later became the Abbey of Orval. It was consecrated in the 12th century. Chiny was the center of the region during the early years. In the 13th century, Florenville was established during the marriage of Isabelle, the daughter of Louis IV, Count of Chiny. The name Florenville is probably derived from "Florent's estate".

In the 17th century, Louis XIV fortified the region around the Semois river. During the French Revolution, the town was the location of fighting between insurgents and French soldiers. On 23 June 1793, the abbey of Orval was burned down and plundered. Later, during the Second World War, the town was occupied by Nazi Germany in 1940. The Germans destroyed many of the houses, damaged the church, and killed the residents. The town returned to France after the war. The municipality of Florenville was established in 1976 and it was granted the honorific title of town (ville) in 1997.

== Geography ==
Florenville is a city and municipality in the Wallonia region. It is one of the ten municipalities in the arrondissement of Virton in the province of Luxembourg. It is located in the southwest part of the country and shares a 50 km (31 mi) international border with France. The Semois river flows through the north of the city. It borders the municipalities of Chiny, Herbeumont, Bouillon, and Meix-devant-Virton.

Spread across an area of 148.1 km^{2} (57.2 sq mi), the municipality incorporates the seven districts of Chassepierre, Florenville, Fontenoille, Lacuisine, Muno, Sainte-Cécile, and Villers-devant-Orval. In 2021, the municipality had a population of 5,687 inhabitants. It is the second largest municipality by population in the Virton arrondissement.

== See also ==
- List of protected heritage sites in Florenville
