= Muno, Belgium =

Muno
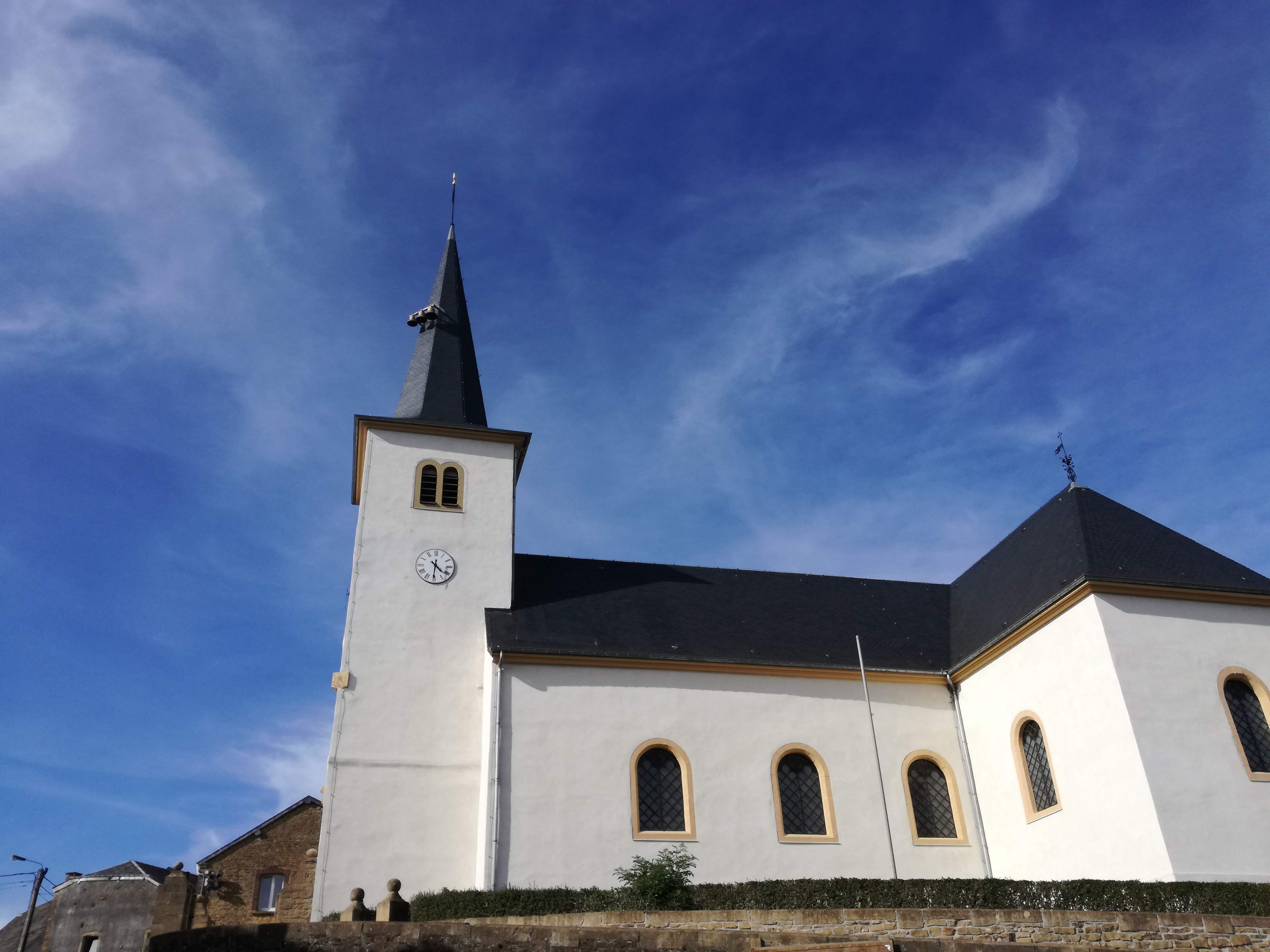
- Saint-Martin Church in Muno

- Location within Belgium
- Coordinates: 49°43′N 05°10.5′E
- Country: Belgium
- Region: Wallonia
- Province: Luxembourg
- Municipality: Florenville
- Postal code: 6820
- Area code: 061

Muno is a village of Wallonia and a district of the municipality of Florenville, located in the province of Luxembourg, Belgium.

A 6-km-long section of the former (line 163A) railway between Muno and Sainte-Cécile, dismantled in 1972, has been converted into a bicycle trail.

== Geography ==
The village is limited on its south-western side by the border with France.
