= Madius (bishop) =

- Bishop of Duvno
- Native name: Madije
- Church: Catholic Church
- Province: Split
- Diocese: Duvno
- In office: Documented by 1327 – 13 November 1344
- Predecessor: Jean de Huy (disputed)
- Successor: John of Léoncel

Orders
- Rank: Bishop

Personal details
- Born: Split, Kingdom of Croatia
- Died: After 25 August 1358
- Denomination: Catholic

Madius (Croatian: Madije or Madij; also known as Magio or Magius; died after 25 August 1358) was a Croatian prelate of the Catholic Church who served as the bishop of Duvno until his resignation in 1344. He is documented as bishop by 1327, although the date of his appointment remains unknown. Konrad Eubel considered him the second bishop of Duvno, while Dominik Mandić and Ante Škegro questioned whether his alleged predecessor, Jean de Huy, had ever held the diocese.

During his episcopate, Madius participated in the issuance of collective indulgences at the papal court in Avignon and supported Valentin, the bishop of Makarska, in ecclesiastical disputes with the Archbishops of Split. He resigned on 28 October 1344, citing hostility from the population of his diocese, and Pope Clement VI accepted his resignation the following month. Madius retained his episcopal title and was subsequently active in Split, where he was last documented in 1358.

== Origins and appointment ==
Madius was from Split and is described in contemporary documents as a member of a religious order. His name also appears as Madij, Magio and Magius. His religious affiliation remains disputed. The historian Ivan Ostojić considered him a Benedictine monk associated with the monastery of St. Stephen near Split, while Marijan Žugaj and Damir Karbić suggested that he was a Franciscan.

The date of Madius's appointment as bishop of Duvno remains unknown because no papal bull of appointment has been found. Eubel placed him after Jean de Huy, whom he considered the diocese's first bishop. Mandić questioned this succession, while Škegro suggested that Madius himself may have been the first bishop, appointed between 1298 and 1311 under the political influence of the Šubić family. The Hrvatski biografski leksikon dates his appointment more cautiously to between 1317 and 1327.

== Activities at Avignon ==
Madius appears in documents issued at the papal court of Pope John XXII in Avignon between 1327 and 1330. During this period, he joined other bishops in granting collective indulgences to churches and religious foundations in Central and Western Europe. The charters identify him as bishop of Duvno, sometimes under the Latin title Demitensis or Vemitensis.

On 30 September 1327, Madius was one of twelve prelates who granted a forty-day indulgence to those performing prescribed acts of devotion at the altar of St. Jodocus in the Marian chapel of Otto Haimo's house in Vienna. On 10 April 1328, he joined nine other bishops in issuing an indulgence for visitors to the Cistercian Heiligenkreuz Abbey, near Vienna. On 24 December 1328, he participated in a similar grant for the women's collegiate foundation at Elten.

On 17 January 1329, Madius joined an indulgence for the chapel of St. John the Baptist at the Benedictine foundation of Vilich, near Bonn. On 29 August, he participated in another grant for the Dominican convent at Kirchberg. On 6 September 1329, he was among the bishops who granted an indulgence for prayers and religious observances concerning members of the House of Habsburg buried at Königsfelden Abbey, including Elisabeth and her sons Leopold and Henry, as well as for Agnes, the former queen of Hungary.

On 19 May 1330, Madius was one of twenty prelates who issued a forty-day indulgence for the chapel of St. Remigius in Itterswiller, Alsace. These documents establish his participation in indulgences issued at Avignon, but do not indicate that he visited the institutions for which they were granted.

== Ecclesiastical disputes ==
On 3 January 1337, Madius appeared as a witness in a document issued at Trogir, where he was identified as bishop of Duvno. In May 1344, he attended a diocesan council in Split and represented Valentin, the bishop of Makarska, in a dispute with Archbishop Dominik Luccari over jurisdiction in Omiš and other ecclesiastical properties. The dispute continued under Luccari's successor, Hugolin Brancao, with proceedings recorded in 1342–1347, 1352–1356 and 1365.

The dispute took place during the decline of the Šubić family's political power. The Šubići supported the establishment of the dioceses of Duvno and Makarska and patronised the Franciscan order. Their weakening position, followed by the expansion of the Banate of Bosnia under Stephen II Kotromanić, reduced the political support available to the two bishops. Škegro also associated the bishops' difficulties with changing religious circumstances and the growing influence of the Bosnian Church.

== Resignation ==
In 1344, Madius travelled to Avignon to seek permission to resign. He stated that he had governed the Diocese of Duvno for many years but could no longer administer it because of the hostility of its population (propter maliciam populi eiusdem). On 28 October 1344, he submitted his resignation, which Clement VI accepted on 13 November. The Pope allowed him to retain his episcopal rank, use pontifical insignia and exercise episcopal functions.

Historians have interpreted Madius's explanation differently. Mandić associated the difficulties with religious opposition in Duvno, while other historians have emphasised resistance to ecclesiastical tithes or the loss of support following the decline of Šubić rule. Škegro considered the political changes brought about by Bosnian expansion, together with religious and economic difficulties, important circumstances of Madius's resignation. However, the papal record itself cites the population's hostility as his reason for withdrawing.

On 20 June 1345, Clement VI appointed John of Léoncel as Madius's successor. John, formerly a Cistercian monk, had previously undergone an irregular episcopal consecration and had been suspended from exercising episcopal functions. His appointment to Duvno followed papal rehabilitation.

== Later life ==
Madius remained a bishop after his resignation and was documented under that title on 20 February 1346. He also visited Avignon in that year. Škegro suggested that he subsequently settled in the Archdiocese of Split, where he may have continued supporting Valentin in his ecclesiastical disputes.

On 25 August 1358, the Split city council elected Madius to a delegation sent to negotiate with representatives of King Louis I of Hungary and Croatia following the end of Venetian rule over the city. The negotiations were to take place in Šibenik. This is the last known documentary reference to Madius, whose exact date and place of death remain unknown.

== Footnotes ==
Catholic Church titles
Preceded by Jean de Huy (disputed)	Bishop of Duvno; By 1327–1344	Succeeded by John of Léoncel
