= List of protected heritage sites in Meix-devant-Virton =

This table shows an overview of the protected heritage sites in the Walloon town Meix-devant-Virton. This list is part of Belgium's national heritage.

Object	Year/architect	Town/section	Address	Coordinates	Number^{?}	Image
Retaining wall and fence of the cemetery of the church of Saint-Andre ^{(nl)} ^{(fr)}		Meix-devant-Virton		49.619495°N 5.425781°E	85024-CLT-0001-01 Info	
Church of Saint-André and surrounding areas ^{(nl)} ^{(fr)}		Meix-devant-Virton		49.619133°N 5.425412°E	85024-CLT-0002-01 Info	
Rectory of the church of Saint-André ^{(nl)} ^{(fr)}		Meix-devant-Virton	Grand'Route n°9	49.619727°N 5.426037°E	85024-CLT-0003-01 Info	
Oven of the church Saint-Andre ^{(nl)} ^{(fr)}		Meix-devant-Virton		49.619652°N 5.426116°E	85024-CLT-0004-01 Info	
Tithe shed of the church Saint-Andre ^{(nl)} ^{(fr)}		Meix-devant-Virton	Grand'Route n°9	49.619797°N 5.426214°E	85024-CLT-0005-01 Info	
Church of Saint-André ^{(nl)} ^{(fr)}		Meix-devant-Virton		49.619280°N 5.425726°E	85024-CLT-0006-01 Info	Kerk Saint-André
The ponds of Soye ^{(nl)} ^{(fr)}		Meix-devant-Virton		49.630657°N 5.421774°E	85024-CLT-0007-01 Info	
Farm: facades and roofs ^{(nl)} ^{(fr)}		Meix-devant-Virton	rue de la Soye n°51	49.617577°N 5.405344°E	85024-CLT-0008-01 Info	
House: facades and roofs, and wall of the orchard ^{(nl)} ^{(fr)}		Meix-devant-Virton	Place du Tilleul n° 21	49.620447°N 5.428412°E	85024-CLT-0009-01 Info	
Building: façade and the entire roof ^{(nl)} ^{(fr)}		Meix-devant-Virton	Grand' Rue n° 37	49.595402°N 5.507581°E	85024-CLT-0010-01 Info	
House: entrance of the main building, including the niche ^{(nl)} ^{(fr)}		Meix-devant-Virton	place de l'Eglise n° 105	49.618804°N 5.424740°E	85024-CLT-0011-01 Info	
Farm: front facades and roof ^{(nl)} ^{(fr)}		Meix-devant-Virton	Petite rue n°160	49.618357°N 5.426911°E	85024-CLT-0012-01 Info	
Farm: facades and roofs ^{(nl)} ^{(fr)}		Meix-devant-Virton	Rue du centre n° 69	49.574678°N 5.479786°E	85024-CLT-0013-01 Info	
Facades and roofs, rear yard and the retaining wall and paved area for the old public wash house ^{(nl)} ^{(fr)}		Meix-devant-Virton	rue Gérouville 28	49.604893°N 5.478073°E	85024-CLT-0014-01 Info	

== See also ==
- List of protected heritage sites in Luxembourg (Belgium)
- Meix-devant-Virton
