= Fléville-Lixières =

- Commune
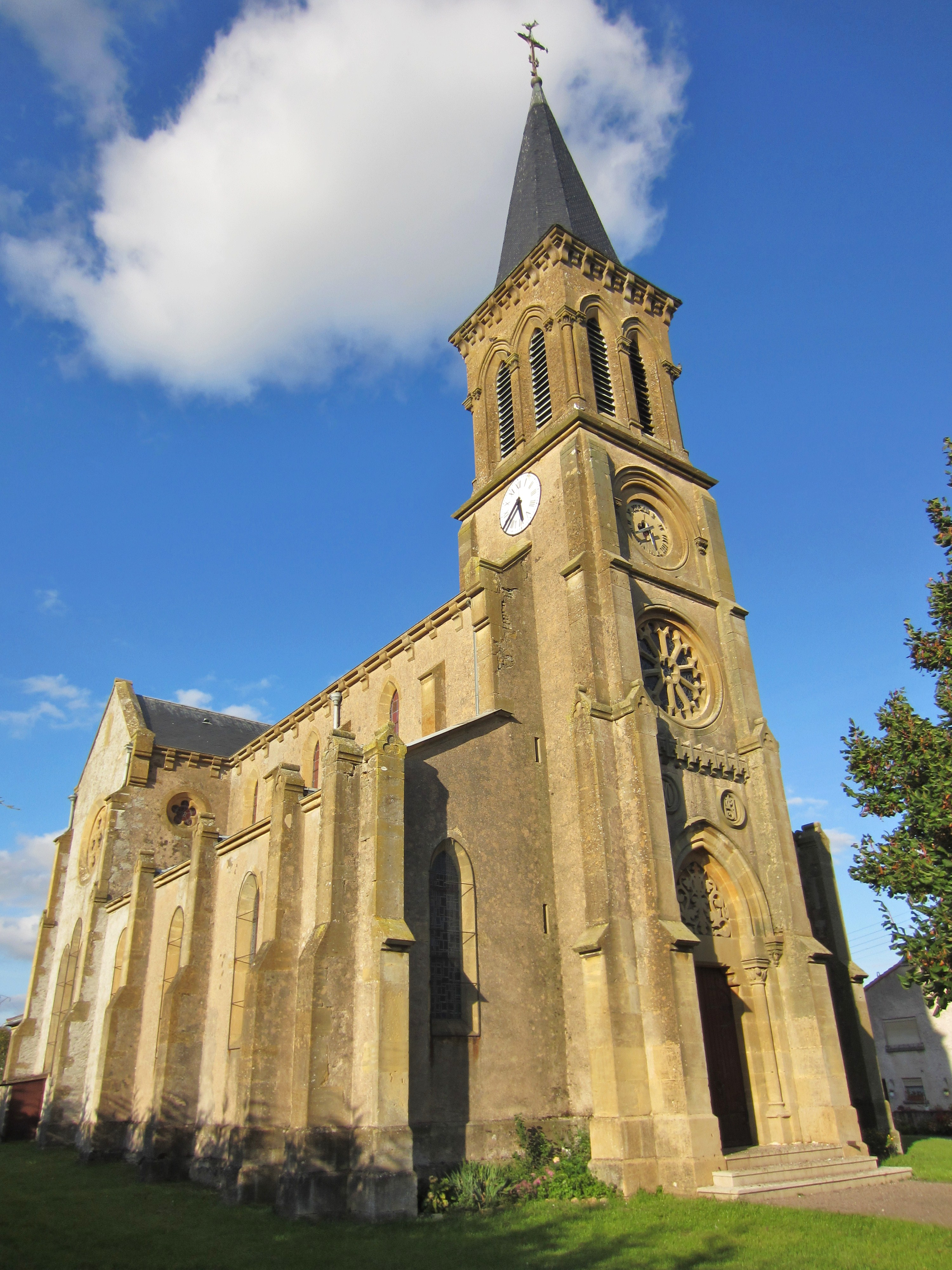
- The church in Fléville-Lixières

- Coat of arms
- Location of Fléville-Lixières
- Location within France Location within Grand Est
- Coordinates: 49°14′45″N 5°49′26″E
- Country: France
- Region: Grand Est
- Department: Meurthe-et-Moselle
- Arrondissement: Val-de-Briey
- Canton: Pays de Briey
- Intercommunality: Orne Lorraine Confluences

Government
  - Mayor (2020–2026): Emilie Weinsberg
- Area^{1}: 14.38 km^{2} (5.55 sq mi)
- Elevation: 233 m (764 ft)
- Highest elevation: 276 m (906 ft)
- Lowest elevation: 211 m (692 ft)
- Population (2023): 299
  - Density: 20.8/km^{2} (53.9/sq mi)
- Time zone: UTC+01:00 (CET)
  - Summer (DST): UTC+02:00 (CEST)
- INSEE/Postal code: 54198 /54150
- ^{1} French Land Register data, which excludes lakes, ponds, glaciers > 1 km^{2} (0.386 sq mi or 247 acres) and river estuaries.

Fléville-Lixières (French pronunciation: [flevil liksjɛʁ]) is a commune in the Meurthe-et-Moselle department in north-eastern France.

== See also ==
- Communes of the Meurthe-et-Moselle department
