= Ogy, Moselle =

Ogy
- Part of Ogy-Montoy-Flanville
- Coat of arms
- Location of Ogy
- Location within France Location within Grand Est
- Coordinates: 49°06′18″N 6°18′41″E
- Country: France
- Region: Grand Est
- Department: Moselle
- Arrondissement: Metz
- Canton: Le Pays Messin
- Commune: Ogy-Montoy-Flanville
- Area^{1}: 3.74 km^{2} (1.44 sq mi)
- Elevation: 252 m (827 ft)
- Highest elevation: 281 m (922 ft)
- Lowest elevation: 242 m (794 ft)
- Population (2019): 473
  - Density: 126/km^{2} (328/sq mi)
- Time zone: UTC+01:00 (CET)
  - Summer (DST): UTC+02:00 (CEST)
- Postal code: 57530
- ^{1} French Land Register data, which excludes lakes, ponds, glaciers > 1 km^{2} (0.386 sq mi or 247 acres) and river estuaries.

Ogy (French pronunciation: [ɔʒi]; German: Ogingen) is a former commune in the Moselle department in Grand Est in north-eastern France. On 1 January 2017, it was merged into the new commune Ogy-Montoy-Flanville. Its population was 473 in 2019.

== See also ==
- Communes of the Moselle department
