= John of Léoncel =

- Bishop of Duvno
- Native name: Joannes de Leoncello
- Church: Catholic Church
- Province: Split
- Diocese: Duvno
- Appointed: 20 June 1345
- Term ended: Unknown
- Predecessor: Madius
- Successor: Stjepan
- Previous post: Bishop of Chunavia (c. 1320–1325; irregular appointment)

Orders
- Consecration: c. 1320
- Rank: Bishop

Personal details
- Died: After 22 December 1345
- Denomination: Catholic

John of Léoncel O.S.B. (Latin: Joannes de Leoncello; died after 1345) was a prelate of the Catholic Church who served as the bishop of Duvno from 1345 until an unknown date. Originally a Cistercian monk at Léoncel Abbey in present-day France, he was irregularly consecrated the bishop of Chunavia in present-day Albania around 1320 by Andrew, the Archbishop of Bar, who had been suspended from exercising episcopal functions.

In 1325, Pope John XXII prohibited John from exercising episcopal functions and ordered him to return to monastic life. John later entered the Benedictine Abbey of Île Barbe near Lyon. On 20 June 1345, Pope Clement VI approved his earlier consecration and appointed him the bishop of Duvno, succeeding Madius. He was exempt from paying the customary episcopal appointment fees because of the diocese's poverty. Whether he ever resided in Duvno or exercised effective jurisdiction there remains unknown.

== Origins and irregular consecration ==
Little is known about John's origins or early ecclesiastical career. He was a monk of the Cistercian Abbey of Léoncel, in the Diocese of Valence in southeastern France, and had been ordained a priest before his episcopal appointment.

Around 1320, Andrew, the Archbishop of Bar, appointed John the bishop of Chunavia. Andrew claimed that Chunavia belonged to the ecclesiastical province of Bar and that its cathedral chapter had failed to elect a bishop within the prescribed period, allowing him to make the appointment. However, Chunavia was a suffragan diocese of the Archdiocese of Durrës, and Andrew had already been suspended from exercising episcopal functions.

John accepted the appointment with permission from his Cistercian superior and was subsequently consecrated by bishops who were not suffragans of Andrew's ecclesiastical province. According to a papal bull issued in 1345, John maintained that he was unaware of Andrew's suspension and believed his appointment and consecration to be valid. He consequently used episcopal insignia and exercised episcopal functions.

== Suspension and monastic life ==
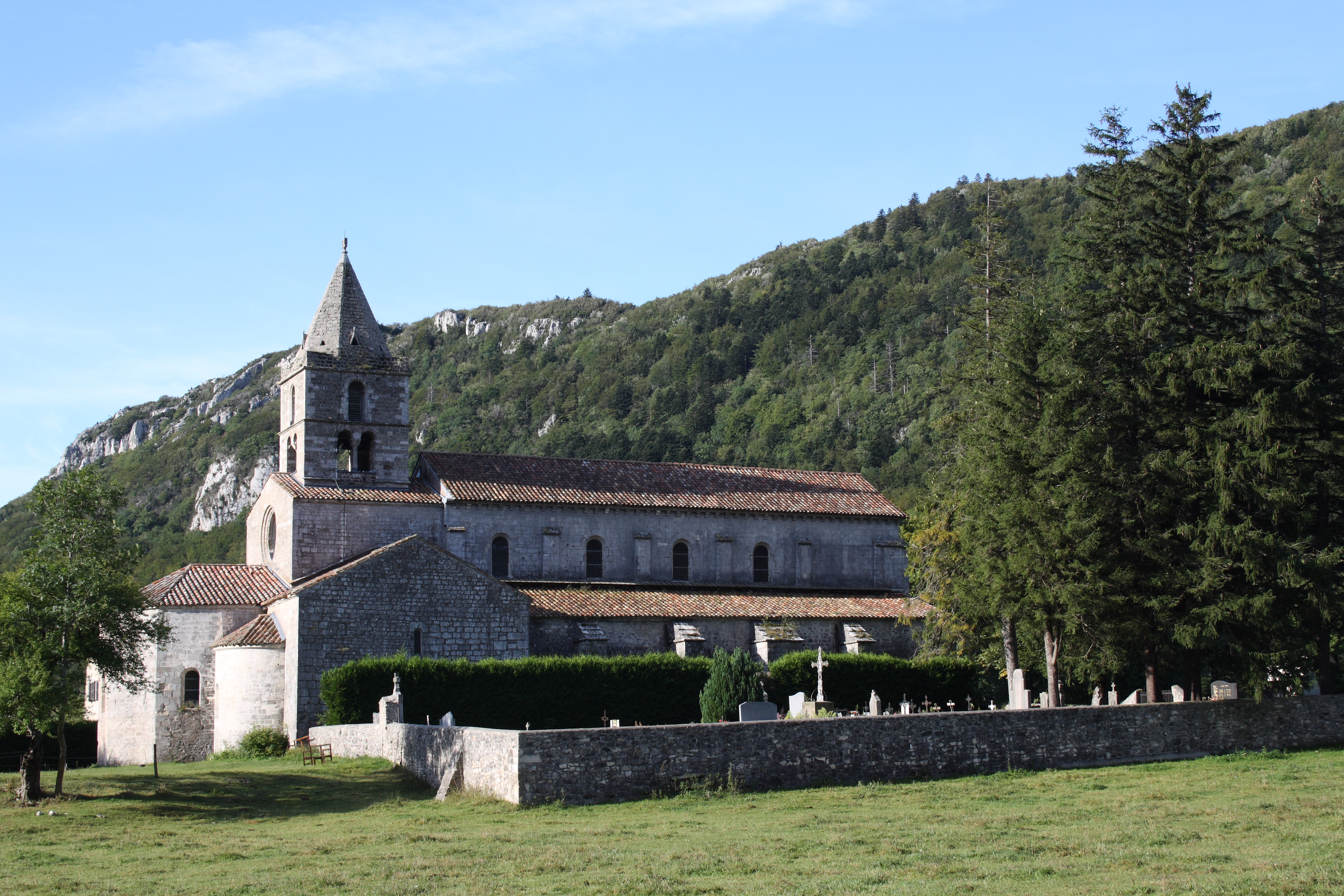
The Cistercian abbey in Léoncel, where John was originally a monk

On 10 July 1325, Pope John XXII prohibited John from exercising episcopal functions or using episcopal insignia and ordered him to return to Léoncel as a monk. John complied and remained at the monastery for several years.

Following disagreements with the abbot of Léoncel, John obtained permission to leave the Cistercian monastery and entered the Benedictine Abbey of Île Barbe, situated on an island in the Saône near Lyon. His admission to the Benedictine community subsequently received apostolic approval, although the date is unknown.

John remained associated with Île Barbe until the pontificate of Clement VI, when the Holy See reconsidered the circumstances of his earlier consecration.

== Appointment to Duvno ==
After Madius resigned as bishop of Duvno in 1344, Clement VI reserved the appointment of his successor. Madius had resigned because of difficulties administering the diocese, which he attributed to hostility from its population.

On 20 June 1345, Clement VI removed the canonical impediments resulting from John's irregular consecration and appointed him the bishop of Duvno. The papal bull, issued at Villeneuve-lès-Avignon near Avignon, approved and ratified his earlier episcopal consecration, restored his right to exercise episcopal functions and entrusted him with the spiritual and temporal administration of the diocese. The document is preserved in Registra Vaticana, volume 169, folios 44v–45r.

Clement VI also addressed letters to the clergy and population of Duvno, instructing them to recognise John as their bishop. The Pope requested the assistance of Dominik Luccari, the Archbishop of Split, under whose metropolitan jurisdiction Duvno was situated, and Stephen II Kotromanić, the Ban of Bosnia, whose authority extended over the territory of the diocese. Both were asked to support John and protect the rights and possessions of his bishopric.

== Later episcopate ==
On 22 December 1345, John was exempted from paying the customary episcopal appointment fees, known as the servitium commune, because of poverty (propter paupertatem). The exemption was recorded in the financial registers of the Apostolic Camera, in Obligationes, volume 22, folio 4v. According to Ante Škegro, the exemption reflected the Diocese of Duvno's difficult economic circumstances following the decline of the Šubić family, which had previously supported the bishopric.

Little is known about John's activities after his appointment. The historian Dominik Mandić, who examined the Vatican records concerning the bishops of Duvno, found no further evidence of his episcopal activities after December 1345. It remains unknown whether John took possession of the diocese or exercised his authority from elsewhere.

Škegro conventionally dated John's episcopate to 1345–1355 but acknowledged the lack of documentary evidence concerning its end. The historian Marijan Žugaj likewise recorded John's appointment in 1345 but did not assign a definite end date. Stjepan was subsequently documented as a bishop associated with Duvno by the mid-1350s. John's exact date and place of death remain unknown.

== Footnotes ==
Catholic Church titles
Preceded by Madius	Bishop of Duvno; 1345–unknown	Succeeded by Stjepan
