= Flemish dialects =

Varieties of Dutch spoken in Flanders, Belgium

Flemish
- Vlaams
- Native to: Belgium, Netherlands, France
- Region: Flanders (Belgian, Zeelandic, French)
- Ethnicity: Flemings
- Native speakers: 6.5 million (2016)
- Language family: Indo-European: Germanic; West Germanic; Istvaeonic; Low Franconian; Dutch; Flemish
- Dialects: West Flemish; East Flemish; Brabantian (Note: Depending on the definition of "Flemish" in context. Brabantian is classified as a dialect of Dutch. It is spoken in the historical Duchy of Brabant, spanning the Belgian provinces of Antwerp, Flemish Brabant and Brussels that are part of the modern region of Flanders.); Limburgish (Note: Depending on the definition of "Flemish" in context. Limburgish is either classified as a dialect of Dutch or as a separate language altogether. It is spoken in the historical Duchy of Limburg and County of Loon, spanning the Belgian province of Limburg that is part of the modern region of Flanders.)

Language codes
- ISO 639-1: nl for Dutch
- ISO 639-2: dut (B) for Dutch nld (T)
- ISO 639-3: nld – inclusive code for Dutch; Individual codes: vls – West Flemish zea – Zeelandic lim – Limburgish
- Glottolog: dutc1256 Dutch
- IETF: nl-BE

- Person: Fleming (Vlaming)
- People: Flemings (Vlamingen)
- Language: Flemish (Vlaams), VGT (Vlaamse Gebarentaal)
- Country: Flanders (Vlaanderen)

State official languages of Belgium: Dutch French German Brussels is a bilingual area where both Dutch and French have an official status.

Flemish (Vlaams [vlaːms]) is a Low Franconian dialect cluster of the Dutch language. It is sometimes referred to as Flemish Dutch (Vlaams-Nederlands), Belgian Dutch (Belgisch-Nederlands [ˈbɛlɣis ˈneːdərlɑnts]), or Southern Dutch (Zuid-Nederlands). Flemish is native to the region known as Flanders in northern Belgium; it is spoken by Flemings, the dominant ethnic group of the region. Outside of Belgian Flanders, it is also spoken to some extent in French Flanders and the Dutch Zeelandic Flanders.

== Terminology ==
In the context of languages, the term Flemish itself has become ambiguous. Nowadays, it is used in at least five ways, depending on the context. These include:

1. An indication of Dutch written and spoken in Flanders including the Dutch standard language as well as the non-standardized dialects, including intermediate forms between vernacular dialects and the standard. Some linguists avoid the term Flemish in this context and prefer the designation Belgian-Dutch or South-Dutch
2. A synonym for the so-called intermediate language in Flanders region, the Tussentaal
3. An indication of the non-standardized dialects and regiolects of Flanders region, so extending beyond East Flemish and West Flemish dialects to include some Limburgish and Brabantian dialects
4. An indication of the non-standardized dialects of only the former County of Flanders, i.e. the current provinces of West Flanders and East Flanders, Zeelandic Flanders and French Flanders
5. An indication of the non-standardized West Flemish dialects of the province of West Flanders, the Dutch Zeelandic Flanders and French Frans-Vlaanderen

Glottolog considers Western Flemish to be a separate language, classified as a part of the Southwestern Dutch family together with the Zeelandic language. According to Glottolog, Western Flemish includes the dialects of French Flemish and West Flemish. Brabantian and East Flemish are classified as Dutch dialects, under the Central Southern Dutch dialect group. Ethnologue considers Limburgish and West Flemish to be separate (regional) languages.

== Characteristics ==
Dutch is the majority language in Belgium, used in the written language by three-fifths of the population of Belgium. It is one of the three national and state languages of Belgium, together with French and German, and is the only official language of the Flemish Region.

The various Dutch dialects spoken in Belgium contain a number of lexical and grammatical features that distinguish them from the standard Dutch. Standard Dutch words can have a completely different meaning in Flemish or imply different context, comparable to the differences between the British and North American variants of English. As is also the case in the Netherlands, the pronunciation of Standard Dutch is affected by the native dialect of the speaker.

All Dutch dialect groups spoken in Belgium are spoken in adjacent areas of the Netherlands as well. East Flemish forms a continuum with both Brabantic and West Flemish. Standard Dutch is primarily based on the Hollandic dialect (spoken in the Western provinces of the Netherlands) and to a lesser extent on Brabantian, which is the dominant dialect in Flanders, as well as in the south of the Netherlands.

=== Tussentaal ===
The supra-regional, semi-standardized colloquial form (mesolect) of Dutch spoken in Belgium uses the vocabulary and the sound inventory of the Brabantic dialects. It is often called an "in-between-language" or "intermediate language", intermediate between dialects and standard Dutch. Despite its name, Brabantian is the dominant contributor to the Flemish Dutch tussentaal.

It is a rather informal variety of speech, which occupies an intermediate position between vernacular dialects and the standard language. It incorporates phonetic, lexical and grammatical elements not part of the standard language but drawn from local dialects.

It is a relatively new phenomenon that has been gaining popularity during the past decades. Some linguists note that it seems to be undergoing a process of (limited) standardisation or that it is evolving into a koiné variety.

Tussentaal is slowly gaining popularity in Flanders because it is used a lot in television dramas and comedies. Often, middle-class characters in a television series will be speaking tussentaal, lower-class characters use the dialect of the location where the show is set (such as Western Flanders), and upper-class characters will speak Standard Dutch. That has given tussentaal the status of normality in Flanders. It is slowly being accepted by the general population, but it has met with objections from writers and academics who argue that it dilutes the usage of Standard Dutch. Tussentaal is used in entertainment television but rarely in informative programmes (like the news), which normally use Flemish accents with standard Dutch vocabulary.

=== Belgicisms ===
A Belgicism is a word or expression that occurs only in the Belgian variant of Dutch. It should not be confused with Belgicisms within the context of the French language, which refers to words and phrases unique to Belgian French. Some are rarely used; others are used daily and are considered part of the Belgian-Dutch standard language. Many Belgicisms are loanwords and words or expressions literally translated from French (also called gallicisms); others, in contrast, are actually remarkably purist, such as droogzwierder (a compound of Dutch droog "dry" and zwierder "spinner") meaning "spin dryer" (common standard Dutch: centrifuge, a loanword from French), and duimspijker (a compound of Dutch duim "thumb" and spijker "nail") meaning "thumbtack" (common standard Dutch: punaise, a loanword from French). Among the Belgicisms, there are also many words that are considered obsolete, formal, or purist in standard Dutch. Moreover, many Belgicisms have their origin in the Belgian official nomenclature. For example, misdaad "felony" is not a legal term in the Netherlands, but it is in Belgium.

== Etymology ==
The English adjective Flemish (first attested as flemmysshe, c. 1325; compare Flæming, c. 1150), meaning "from Flanders", was probably borrowed from Old Frisian. The Old Dutch form is flāmisk, which becomes vlamesc, vlaemsch in Middle Dutch and Vlaams in Modern Dutch.

The word Vlaams itself is derived from Ingvaeonic *flâm-, from Germanic *flauma-, meaning 'flooded'. The name Vlaanderen was formed from a stem *flâm-, with a suffix -đr or -dr attached.

== See also ==
- Belgian French
- Dutch in Belgium
- East Flemish
- French Flemish, the West Flemish dialect as spoken in France
- Languages of Belgium
- Zeelandic, a transitional dialect between West Flemish and Hollandic
