= Montoy-Flanville =

Commune in Moselle, France

- Part of Ogy-Montoy-Flanville
- Coat of arms
- Location of Montoy-Flanville
- Location within France Location within Grand Est
- Coordinates: 49°07′19″N 6°16′54″E
- Country: France
- Region: Grand Est
- Department: Moselle
- Arrondissement: Metz
- Canton: Le Pays Messin
- Commune: Ogy-Montoy-Flanville
- Area^{1}: 6.32 km^{2} (2.44 sq mi)
- Elevation: 206 m (676 ft)
- Highest elevation: 279 m (915 ft)
- Lowest elevation: 189 m (620 ft)
- Population (2019): 1,286
  - Density: 203/km^{2} (527/sq mi)
- Time zone: UTC+01:00 (CET)
  - Summer (DST): UTC+02:00 (CEST)
- Postal code: 57645
- ^{1} French Land Register data, which excludes lakes, ponds, glaciers > 1 km^{2} (0.386 sq mi or 247 acres) and river estuaries.

Montoy-Flanville (French pronunciation: [mɔ̃twa flɑ̃vil]; German: Montingen-Flanheim) is a former commune in the Moselle department in Grand Est in north-eastern France. On 1 January 2017, it was merged into the new commune Ogy-Montoy-Flanville.

== See also ==
- Communes of the Moselle department
