= Orval Abbey =

Monastery in Belgium

Coordinates: 49°38′23″N 5°20′56″E

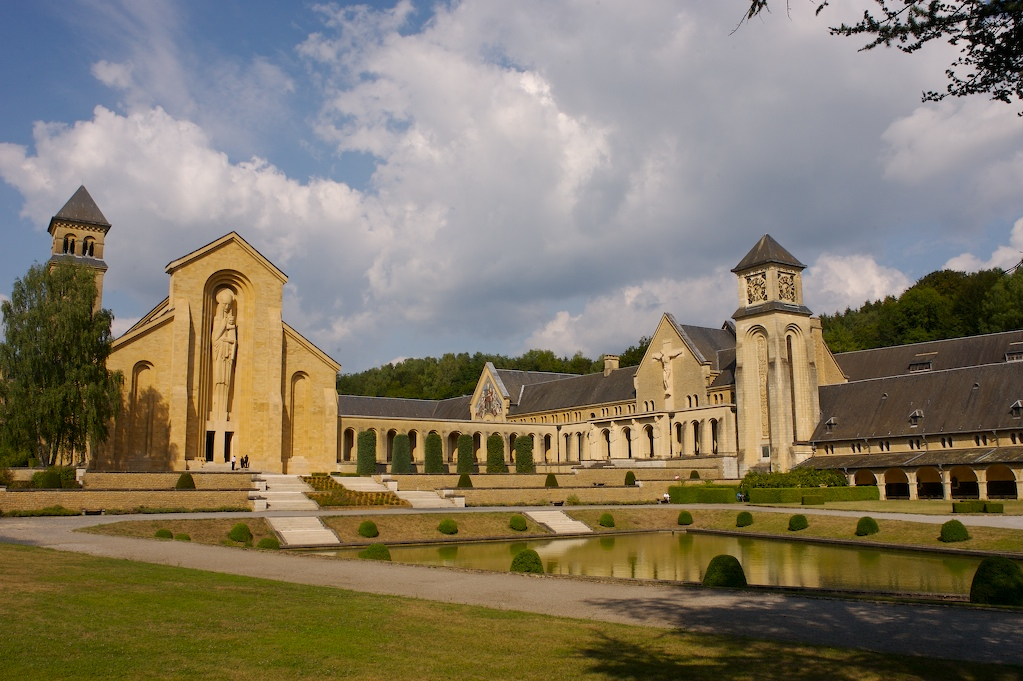
Orval Abbey Church

Orval Abbey (Abbaye Notre-Dame d'Orval) is a Cistercian monastery founded in 1132 in the Gaume region of Belgium, located in Villers-devant-Orval, part of Florenville, Wallonia in the province of Luxembourg. The abbey is well known for its history and spiritual life but also for its local production of the Trappist beer Orval and a specific cheese.

== History ==
=== First foundation ===
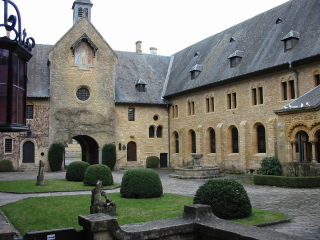
Entry to Orval Abbey via the guest house.

The site has been occupied since the Merovingian period, and there is evidence that there was already a chapel here in the 10th century. Around 1070, a group of Benedictine monks from Calabria settled here, at the invitation of Arnold I, Count of Chiny, and Conrad I, Count of Luxembourg, and began construction of a church and a monastery, but after some forty years, possibly because of the death of Count Arnould, they moved away again. They were replaced by a community of Canons Regular, who completed the construction work: the abbey church was consecrated on 30 September 1124.

In 1132, a group of Cistercian monks from Trois-Fontaines Abbey in Champagne arrived, and the two groups formed a single community within the Cistercian Order, under the first abbot, Constantin.

Around 1252, the monastery was destroyed by a fire; the rebuilding took around 100 years. Wenceslaus I was buried here in 1383.

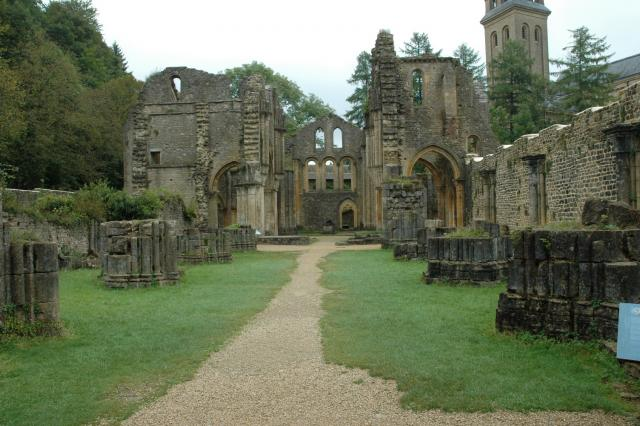
Orval Abbey Ruins.

In the literary field the monks of Orval did not much distinguish themselves. The only noteworthy writer was Aegidius or Gilles d'Orval, who lived in the first half of the thirteenth century. He wrote the continuation, to the year 1251, of the "Gesta Pontificum Leodiensium", which had been written up to the year 1048 by Heriger of Lobbes and Anselm of Liège.

During the 15th and 16th centuries, the various wars between France and various neighbouring regions (Burgundy, Spain) had an important impact on Orval. At one stage a foundry was established on the site. In 1637, during the Thirty Years' War, the abbey was pillaged and burnt by French mercenaries.

In the 17th century, the abbey converted to the Trappist branch of the Cistercian order, but reverted to the Rule of the main order in around 1785. In 1793, during the French Revolution, the abbey was completely burnt down by French forces, in retaliation for the hospitality it had provided to Austrian troops, and the community forcibly dispersed.

=== Second foundation ===
In 1887, the land and ruins were acquired by the Harenne family. They donated the lands to the Cistercian order in 1926 so that monastic life could resume on the site. Between 1926 and 1948, under the direction of the Trappist monk Marie-Albert van der Cruyssen, the new monastery was constructed, and in 1936 Orval regained the rank of abbey. On 8 September 1948, the new church was consecrated. The abbey has many artifacts designed and produced by Camille Colruyt.

The medieval tradition of brewing beer at the Abbey was revived in 1931 to generate funds for the rebuilding. The ruins of the medieval buildings remain on the site and are available to view.

== Abbots of Orval Abbey ==
- c. 1311–1317: Jean de Huy
- 1936–1950: Marie-Albert van der Cruyssen
- 1950–1966: Vincent de Paul Sonthonnax
- 1966–1967: Raphaël Boulet
- 1967–1971: François-Xavier Hanin
- 1971–1980: Étienne Gillard
- 1980–1981: Denis Debusschere
- 1982–1984: Jacques Bernier
- 1984–1988: Paul Barbe
- 1988–1999: Éric Dion
- 1999–2003: Matthieu Cauwe
- 2003–2007: Jean Kremer
- 2007–2019: Lode Van Hecke

== The legend of Orval ==
There is a legend of the abbey's foundation, purporting to explain the name '"Orval" and the coat of arms. According to this, the widowed Mathilda of Tuscany was visiting the site, when she lost her wedding ring in a spring, to her great distress. When she prayed for the return of the ring, a trout appeared on the surface of the water with the ring in its mouth. She exclaimed "Truly this place is a Val d'Or (Golden Valley)", from which the name "Orval" is derived, and in gratitude made available the funds for the foundation of the monastery here. The abbey arms show the trout and ring. The spring still supplies water to the monastery and its brewery.
