= Lorrain language =

Regional language in France and Belgium

Lorrain
- Lorraine
- Lorin / Loûerë
- Region: Northeastern France, Belgium
- Language family: Indo-European: Italic; Latino-Faliscan; Romance; Italo-Western; Western Romance; Gallo-Romance; Gallo-Rhaetian (possibly); Oïl; Lorrain
- Early forms: Old Latin: Vulgar Latin; Proto-Romance; Old Gallo-Romance; Old French
- Dialects: Gaumais; Welche

Official status
- Recognised minority language in: French Community of Belgium

Language codes
- ISO 639-3: –
- Glottolog: lorr1242
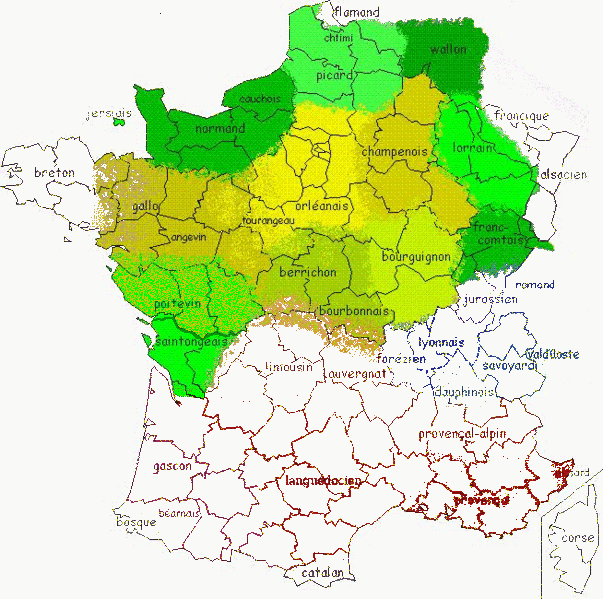
- Lorrain, at the east among other oïl languages

- Lorrain is classified as Severely Endangered by the UNESCO Atlas of the World's Languages in Danger (2010).

Lorrain, also known as Lorrain Romance, is a langue d'oïl spoken by a minority of people in the region of Lorraine in northeastern France as well as in some parts of Alsace and Gaume in Belgium. Its use declined at the beginning of the 21st century, having been in serious decline since the 1930s. Despite this, more and more people are taking an interest in it in the 21st century, including linguists who study it.

It is a regional language of France. In Wallonia, it is known as Gaumais and enjoys official recognition as a regional language. It has been influenced by Lorraine Franconian and Luxembourgish, West Central German languages spoken in nearby or overlapping areas.

Lorrain was also spoken in the high valleys of the Vosges, and there it retained archaic forms such as the preservation of affricates (tchaté for château); on the Alsatian side (Pays welche), we distinguish Welche, which is related to the dialects of the Eastern Vosges.

It is often referred to as a patois.

== Variations ==
The Linguasphere Observatory distinguishes seven variants:

- Argonnais (Argonne, Woëvre, eastern French Ardennes, Meuse, Meurthe-et-Moselle)
- Longovician (Longwy, Longuyon, northern Meurthe-et-Moselle)
- Gaumais (arrondissement of Virton, cantons of Montmédy and Stenay in Meuse and the canton of Carignan in Ardennes)
- Messin (Metz, Metzgau and all of French-speaking Moselle)
- Nancéien (Nancy, southern Meurthe-et-Moselle)
- Spinalian (Épinal, central Vosges)
- Deodatian (Saint-Dié, Hautes-Vosges)

After 1870, members of the Stanislas Academy in Nancy noted 132 variants of Lorrain from Thionville in the north to Rupt-sur-Moselle in the south, which means that main variants have sub-variants.

== History ==
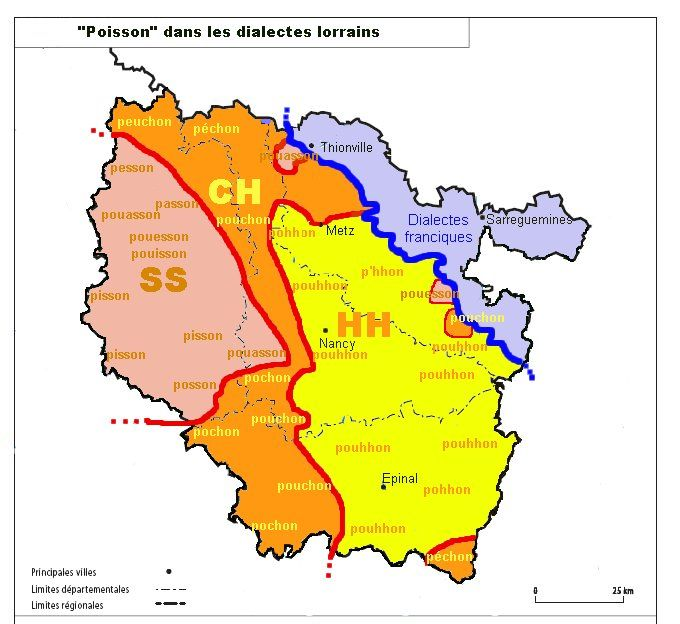
The word "fish" in the Lorrain dialects.

Under the Ancien Régime, as in Lorrain, which was still independent, education was a religious matter. From the beginning of the 17th century, the Bishop of Toul mandated that each parish have a school, which was implemented. The "schoolmasters" trained in French, then taught in French. While the children continued to speak the local dialect, they incorporated many neologisms of French origin into their mother tongue. It is likely that many Lorrain words phonetically close to French saw their pronunciation shift towards the latter from this point onward. Thus, a kind of linguistic transformation occurred from this period onward.

The French Revolution's motto was one nation, one language, which some interpreted as one nation, one single language. Regional languages were thus subjected to fierce attacks in a wide variety of forms from the revolutionary period until the beginning of the 20th century. However, it is deeply unfair to place the blame for the decline of regional languages solely on secular schoolteachers, even those who were staunch defenders of the Republic. This attributes to them more influence than they actually possessed, even if some of them did employ highly coercive methods. Other education officials also worked extensively to transmit this intangible heritage. Léon Zéliqzon was a university professor when he published his seminal work: Dictionnaire des patois romans de Moselle. He had been preceded in this by Lucien Adam, who wrote his lexicon Les patois lorrains, drawing on the contributions of local correspondents, mostly schoolteachers. Henri Labourasse, who is the author of the Glossaire abrégé des patois de la Meuse, was also an officer of Public Instruction.

The definitive abandonment of Lorrain was primarily economic and social in nature. The beginning of the second half of the 19th century saw a massive internal exodus. The population, until then essentially rural, moved to the cities in search of work in the newly emerging industries. While language did not significantly hinder obtaining factory jobs during periods of full employment, speaking the national language was essential for climbing the corporate ladder. The same was true for securing a highly coveted position in the 19th century civil service. The people of Lorraine, and especially Lorraine mothers, quickly understood that French was the language of social advancement and imposed it on their children from a very young age. The monographs written for each town in preparation for the 1889 Exposition Universelle provide valuable information for assessing the state of the regional language. At that time, Lorrain Romance was still known to all but the majority of rural Lorrainers spoke French, outside German Lorraine.

Georges Tronquart, in his work Trois patois de la colline inspirée, provides several examples of the evolution of the regional language in his village. In 1890, the children of Saxon-Sion addressed adults in patois, but by 1900, they were answering adults in French, even those who addressed them in patois. The Saxon-Sion town council meetings were held in patois until 1910. Mr. Thirion, born and died in Saxon-Sion, never uttered a word of French before 1914; he didn't speak a word of patois again after 1918. Conversely, the same author is surprised that the young girls of Praye were still speaking patois among themselves in 1923.

The situation evolved quite differently in the Moselle department. Its annexation in 1871 sparked a renewed interest in the two local languages. In both cases, this allowed for the assertion of local identity and offered the added advantage of not being understood by the "Old Germans" (for the Romance dialect) and even by most of them (for the Germanic dialects). While Standard German was the official language of the Reichsland, French remained the language of administration and education in municipalities considered Francophonie, and its use remained tolerated elsewhere (even if frowned upon by some). In the biography of Hubert Vion, parish priest of Bazoncourt from 1869 to 1896 and author of several works on the Lorrain Romance dialect, it is recounted that he had the audacity to address a compliment in the Romance dialect to Emperor Wilhelm II during a visit to the region. Thus, while Lorrain Romance underwent a very clear and rapid decline in Meurthe-et-Moselle, Meuse and the Vosges, it experienced a certain revival in Moselle. It was only from 1945 onwards that it ceased to be spoken in this department.

== Toponymy ==
In Old Lorrain, the phoneme formed by the letter X and its " French-style " pronunciation did not exist. The letter X, present in numerous place names and some Lorrain surnames, originated as a spelling error. Émile Badel, in his Dictionnaire des noms de rues à Nancy denounces "the verbal corruption of Lorrain place names containing the letter 'x'." He explains that this letter replaced the Greek letter <χ>, whose phonetics are entirely different. To clearly express his disapproval, he concludes the discussion with these words: "The modern incorrect pronunciation is therefore merely the result of a kind of pedantry that presumes to know how to read correctly". Others believe that it was the advent of printing, with its limited set of typefaces, that brought about the substitution between <χ> and <x>.

Originally, the Lorrain phoneme, now misspelled <x>, was a sound [x] resembling the German <ch>, the Spanish jota, or the Breton <c'h> , a sound also found, for example, in Arabic and Russian. In late 19th and early 20th century Lorrain Romance studies, this phoneme is written <hh> by philologists (see, among others, the works of Léon Zéliqzon).

In surnames of Lorrain origin and in Lorrain place names, the pronunciation of the letter <x> is, depending on the case, indicated as <ch, c, s, ss> and <z> in 18th and 19th century works; for example , the pronunciations of Xertigny and Xivray-et-Marvoisin are given as "Certigny" and "Sivray" in 1756, the pronunciations of Xocourt and Vaxy are given as "Chocourt" and "Vachi" in 1861, while the x in Saint-Max is silent at that time: "mâ". Regarding this last town, at the end of the 20th century, one could still hear former inhabitants pronouncing a guttural and very muffled [ʁ], barely audible, at the end of the place name. Example: Saint-Mâr. This "devoicing" of the last letter was not rare. It occurred on the final [e] of Toul pronounced Toue. It is important to understand the difference between this "devoicing" and the elision found in Foug (Fou in Lorrain), in Einville-au-Jard (Einville-au-Ja) and especially in Art-sur-Meurthe (É-su-Meu).

Around Charmes and Épinal, place names with <x> were pronounced [s] until the end of the 20th century: Nomexy was pronounced Nome'si, Vaubexy was pronounced Vaube'si, Ubexy was pronounced Ube'si.

The evolution of name pronunciations in the 19th and 20th centuries is probably not a new phenomenon. It is important to bear in mind that these pronunciations are those of a given historical period and that they were probably very different earlier in history.

Some examples of localities in Romanesque Lorrain from the 19th century: S'li en Sauneu (Silly-en-Saulnois), Aumanv'lé (Amanvillers), Auvlé (Avillers), Circo (Circourt), Ronco (Roncourt), Ansrevelle (Ancerville), Fieuvelle (Fléville), Lech'ire (Lixières), Méch'ly (Marsilly), Ma-lai-tô (Mars-la-Tour), Mékieuf (Mécleuves), Bieu (Beux), Monteu (Montoy), Augondange/Agondanche (Hagondange), Souagsonche (Xouaxange), Chaméni (Xermaménil), Lovni (Louvigny), Coïni (Colligny), Ponteu (Pontoy), Pinaud (Épinal), Giromouè (Gérardmer), Rambièlè (Rambervillers), Nanceye (Nancy), Lâchou (Laxou), L'nainville (Lunéville), Sallebo (Sarrebourg), Ouëpy (Woippy), Virtang (Virton).

Many Lorrain words are found in street names in Metz, including ailli, les rues Wad-Billy, de la Baue, aux Ossons, Paille-Maille, Chambière, Coffe Millet, Taison, de Saulnerie, en Fournirue, en Chandelerue. In Nancy: porte de la Craffe, sentier de la Teulotte, rues de la Boudière, de la Foucotte, des Michottes, de la croix d'Auyot, de l'Atrie. In Malzéville: l'Embanie, du Salvon, du Chazeau. In Laxou: Com des Chicottes ; dans cette ville, le nom lorrain rue du Chaucheu a été traduit en rue du Pressoi. In Épinal: l'Atre, rues du Boudiou, Vautrin (patronyme lorrain), du Saulcy, des Béguinettes, de la Maix. In Moyen: la Ouette charrière. In Dombasle-sur-Meurthe: l'Embanie, du Couaroil, de Behard.

== Features ==
Linguist Stephanie Russo noted the difference of a 'second' imperfect and pluperfect tense between Lorrain and Standard French. It is derived from Latin grammar that is no longer used in modern French.

=== Declamation ===
Since the number of speakers was very small in 2019, it is possible to listen to Aesop's fable, "la bise et le soleil", in several variants of Lorrain Romance from the page Atlas sonore des langues régionales de France, in France hexagonale.

The Lorrain accent is also tending to disappear. Apart from a few towns in southeastern Meurthe-et-Moselle and in the Vosges countryside, it can only be heard in 2019 by very attentive listeners. However, some Lorrainers can still be recognized who, as in the old regional language, tend to replace demonstrative pronouns with enclitic adverbs. For example: " l'objet là" instead of "cet objet." The gender of objects is also a pitfall for Lorrainers because the old language used the feminine form more often than modern French. Gender errors with words like "arrosoir" (watering can), "anse" (handle), or "éclair" (lightning bolt) are still common in 2020.

The articles le and la, which were systematically placed before proper names (for example: "le Jeannot", "la Marie"), are much less frequent but have not disappeared.

=== Phonetic ===
The very characteristic phoneme /x/ was discussed in the Toponymy section.

The letter <h> in Lorrain words is clearly aspirated, as in Harvard English. It should never be linked to the preceding word.

The letter <Y> constitutes another distinctive feature. Some philologists do not hesitate to call it the "consonne lorraine" since it is always pronounced. [Haye], which means hedge, is another phonetic example with [y]. The word was pronounced [eille] as in veille (night/wake).

Philologists have debated at length the Lorrain [in], which also does not exist in French. It is present, notably, in [roncin]. It is a nasal sound that Lucien Adam compares to the Latin [in] such as "in petto", pronounced in such a way that the final [n] is barely audible.

==== Lorrain vowels ====
The Lorrain accent, with its drawn-out and heavily stressed [â], [ô], and [î], has often been ridiculed, frequently labeled as "peasantic." In reality, it is an accent of duration and gravity that plays the role of stress accent in the Lorrain language in other languages. The [â], [ô], and [î] should rather be considered additional vowels, since unstressed vowels as used in French are perfectly well known and frequently used in Lorrain; for example, the two [a]s in margatte (a Lorrain word meaning mud) are pronounced exactly as in French. The same is true for the [o] in godot (glass). On the other hand, the drawn-out [î] in rîge (sieve) and nîge (snow) seems to be less common.

Lucien Adam indicates that Lorrain has the following 8 vowels called oral: i, é, è, a, e, o, ou and u. He adds to this 4 vowels called nasal: ain, an, on and un.

While Larousse indicates that modern French no longer has diphthongs, Lucien Adam lists more than thirty for Lorrain, but this remark no longer makes much sense today since there are no longer enough speakers to make these complicated variations heard.

== Grammar ==
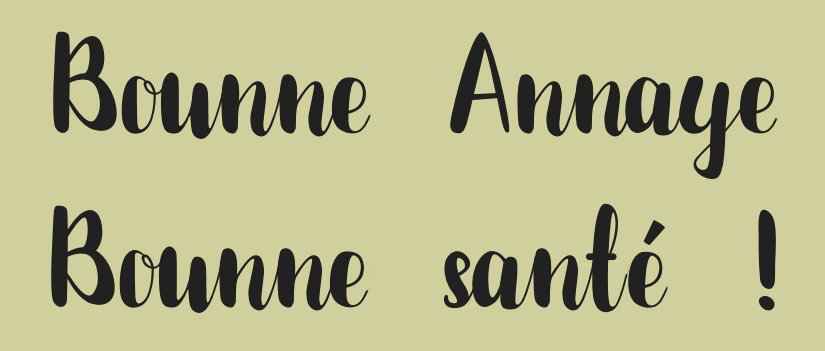
Greeting card in the Lorrain dialect of Meuse (Barrois): Bounne Annaye, Bounne Santé, sometimes written Bounne Annaïe/Bounne Anneye...

Although Lorrain has no standardized spelling, it does have a grammar, and it is quite complex. Léon Zéliqzon identifies three groups of verbs, each containing irregular verbs as well as strong and weak verbs. Reflexive verbs are always conjugated with the auxiliary verb avoir.

Whereas French has retained a large part of the personal verbal endings of Latin (in the written language), most Lorrain verbs are conjugated with only two inflections: one for the singular and one for the plural. Example of conjugation in the imperfect tense of the verb parler: “dje prakè, te prakè, è prakè, dje prakonne, vos prakonne, è prakonne”.

=== Imperfect tenses ===
Where French has only one imperfect tense, the Lorrain dialect has developed a system allowing it to express nuance in this temporality by adding or omitting the adverb or (or or ores, meaning "now" or "at this very moment" in Old French) after the verb in the imperfect tense. The Lorrain dialect distinguishes between a past action expressed in the imperfect tense, close in time, and one situated further in the future or of a more general nature. For example, where French would use the same imperfect tense to speak of the clouds that passed in the sky yesterday and those that passed in the sky when Louis XIV watched the construction of Versailles, the Lorrain dialect will be able to express this nuance and say that the clouds were passing "or" in the sky yesterday , while others were passing in the sky when Louis XIV watched "or" the construction of Versailles (the passing clouds designating a general, passive, and peripheral action, while the focus of the immediate action is that of Louis XIV watching the construction of Versailles).

With very few exceptions, the Lorrain dialect does not use defining adjectives, replacing them with an article and an enclitic adverb. Even today, in 2020, it is not unusual to hear someone from Lorrain say "l'homme là" in place of "cet homme".

Adverbs of place are always emphatic: "to ci" and "to lè" for [ici] and [là]. With rare exceptions, the same is true for interrogative pronouns.

Common nouns do not undergo any change, or very rarely, when changing from singular to plural.

== Lorrain dictionaries ==
The Lorrain Romance language has been the subject of numerous studies, particularly from the late 18th to the early 20th century. Here , in chronological order, are the main reference dictionaries:

- 1775: Essai sur le patois lorrain des environs du comté du Ban de la Roche by Jérémie-Jacques Oberlin;
- 1881: Les Patois lorrains by Lucien Adam;
- 1887: Essai sur un patois vosgien by Nicolas Haillant;
- 1922-1924: Dictionnaire des patois romans de la Moselle by Léon Zéliqzon.
- 21st centur: Dictionnaire français-gaumais online dictionary of Lorrain Gaumais dialects by Georges Themelin.

Lucien Adam's work was heavily criticized upon its publication, but it was primarily the historical origin he gave to the regional language that sparked debate.

== See also ==
- Ban de la Roche region
- Language policy of France
