= Otto I of Duras =

Count of Duras

Count Otto of Loon as he was known during his own lifetime (d. abt 1087), was founder of the family of Counts of Duras, and brother of Emmo, Count of Loon, one of the first known counts of Loon. In contemporary and later medieval records he is mainly known for his role as advocate of Sint-Truiden Abbey, which is today in Belgian Limburg.

== Brother of the count of Loon ==
It has been suggested that Otto and Emmo were sons of Count Giselbert of Loon, who Emmo succeeded as count over Borgloon, although there is no contemporary record of their exact relationship to Giselbert. (It has for example been suggested that Gilbert was their uncle.)

The mother of Emmo and Otto on the other hand is clearly named in one near-contemporary record, as Ludgarde, sister of Albert, Count of Namur.

== Advocacy of Sint-Truiden ==
In a charter dated 1065, Adalbero III of Luxembourg, Bishop of Metz, confirmed Otto’s rights in regard to the abbey. This was partly necessary because the bishop had given a superior advocacy to his own brother Duke Frederic, and disputes did eventually arise between the Abbey and its advocates. These are a major topic of the Gesta or chronicle of St Truiden Abbey.

== Duras ==
The 3rd continuation of the Gesta of St Truiden Abbey, written in the 14th century, is the only medieval source which describes Otto as a Count of Duras, which is a title that his son Gilbert later used. According to an old proposal of Mantelius which Baerten supported, Otto must have married the heiress of the previous known advocate, whose name was Giselbert, and inherited both a county and advocacy. His wife, the mother of his one known son, is known from one record to have been named Oda.

== Marriage and children ==
Otto married Oda. Otto and Oda had children:

- Giselbert II, Count of Duras
- Gerard of Bertrée, Prior of Bertrée
- Hériman de Duras. (Named by Wolters in 19th century. Not named by more recent scholars.)

Upon his death, Otto was succeeded as Count of Duras by his son Giselbert.

== Bibliography ==
- Baerten, Jean, ‘Les origines des comtes de Looz et la formation territoriale du comté’, in: Revue belge de philologie et d'histoire 43 (2 parts; 1965) 459-491, 1217-1242. On persee: part 1, part 2.
- Baerten, Jean, Het Graafschap Loon (11de - 14de eeuw), (Assen 1969). pdf
- Gorissen, P., ‘Omtrent de wording van het graafschap Loon’, in: Jaarboek van de Vereniging van Oudheidkundige en geschiedkundige kringen van België: 32e zitting Congres van Antwerpen 27-31 juli 1947 (1950-1951).
- Mantelius, Joannes, Historiae Lossensis libri decem, (Liège 1717). google
- Ulens, R., "Les origines et les limites primitives du comté de Duras" Bulletin de la Société Scientifique & littéraire du Limbourg 50 (1936) pp. 49–71.
- Vaes, Jan, De Graven van Loon. Loons, Luiks, Limburgs (Leuven 2016)
- Wolters, Mathias J., Notice Historique sur l’Ancien Comté de Duras en Hesbaie, Gyselinck, 1855 (available on Google Books)
- Zeller, Thibaut, "La maison de Durras en Hesbaye : les pilliers de pouvoir d’une parentèle comtale (XIe -XIIe siècles)", l'Annuaire d'histoire liégeoise, 37, (2007-2008), pp. 33–57.

=== Primary sources ===
- Gestorum Abbatem Trudonensium Continuatio Tertia: Koepker (ed.) MGH SS Vol.10 382; =de Borman (ed.) Vol.2 ; =Lavigne (trans.) 228-229 (pdf).
