= Conon, Count of Montaigu and Duras =

Noble in 12th century Lower Lotharingia

Conon II (Cono) (died 1189 or after), Count of Montaigu and Count of Duras, son of Godefroi, Count of Montaigu, and his wife Julienne, daughter of Otto II, Count of Duras was a noble in 12th century Lower Lotharingia.

Conon replaced his elder brother Gilles, who had leprosy, but the precise dates of Conon’s rule are unclear. In a charter dated 1175 donating property to the Knights Hospitaller, Gilles is referred to as former Count and his brothers Pierre and Conon as Counts of Montaigu and Duras respectively. That same charter refers to their uncle Bruno the archdeacon, presumably their great-uncle Bruno, brother to Otto II, Count of Duras. A later charter dated 1182 witnessed by Henri of Esch (a relative of Goffrey of Esch, compatriot of Conon I, Count of Montaigu), identifies Conon as Count of Montaigu and Duras.

In 1185, Conon and his brother Pierre donated all his properties to Sainte-Marie and Saint-Lambert in Liege. These properties were not kept by the Bishop of Liege, who sold them to Gérard of Looz and Wéry of Walcourt.

Conon was not known to be married and left no heirs. After Conon’s death, his brother-in-law Wery II de Walcourt became Count of Montaigu and Clermont, whereas Gérard II, Count of Looz, became the Count of Duras, reflecting the relationship between Looz and Duras dating back to the first Count of Looz, Giselbert.

Gislebert of Mons called him called 'small in body, smaller in mind and knowledge'. He reported he held the advocacy of the Abbey of Saint-Trond and other properties in fief from the Duke of Limbourg, and owed guardianship of the castle of Limbourg-sur-Vesdre. Since Conon failed to answer the Duke's summons, the latter seized his properties, keeping some and selling others to Count Gérard of Looz in 1189. Conon attempted to sell his advocacy to the Duke of Brabant who then occupied Duras and harassed St. Truiden, leading to an armed conflict involving also the Count of Hainaut.

== Sources ==
- Miraeus, A., Opera diplomatica et historica, 2nd edn. (Louvain), Tome II, Supplement, Pars III, LXVIII, 1723
- Wolters, Joseph Mathias, Notice Historique sur l’Ancien Comté de Duras en Hesbaie, Gyselinck, 1855 (available on Google Books)
- C. G. Roland (1893), "Les seigneurs et comtes de Rochefort", Annales de la Société archéologique de Namur, 20: 63–141.
