= County of Duras =

Medieval County

The County of Duras was a 12th-century county in the Holy Roman Empire, with its seat at the castle of Duras, in an area where the Prince bishops of Liège contested for power with the counts of Leuven. The 18th century version of this castle still stands, and is within the municipality of modern Sint-Truiden in the province of Belgian Limburg.

The county was one of several early counties in the Hesbaye region (Haspengouw in Dutch) which covers parts of several Flemish and Wallonian Provinces of Belgium. As a distinct entity under the name Duras the county ceased to exist when the second male line of counts died out. This second line were also the Counts of Montaigu, whose other holdings were further south. Duras was subsequently merged into the neighbouring County of Loon, which was at that time ruled by cousins of the original counts of Duras.

The history of Duras is entangled with that of its powerful neighbour, Sint-Truiden Abbey. The first certain counts of Duras were under-advocates (subadvocati) of the abbey, who were responsible for exercising the secular aspects of lordship on their worldly estate, such as death penalties and military matters. As in many similar cases in the twelfth century, this office became powerful and controversial. There was conflict not only between the subadvocatus and the abbey's own brethren and tenants, but also with the higher advocatus, the Dukes of Limburg, and their successors the Dukes of Brabant. Such conflicts are a major theme in the medieval Gesta or chronicle of the abbey.

== Territory ==
As pointed out by de Borman, and later Ulens, while there is no definitive or clear list of the lands held by the counts of Loon or Duras until after they merged, 14th-century records show that there was a fief within the greater feudal county of Loon which was named as the Duras (sometimes spelled in those documents as "Der As") fief. This fief was surprisingly not limited to areas near the castle of Duras, but intermingled within the lands of the Counts of Loon.

Apart from these lands, the family also inherited lordship over Jodoigne, now in the Walloon Brabant part of the Hesbaye region, which was eventually annexed by the lords of Brabant and Louvain. This had belonged to a widow Erlinde in the 11th century, who became a nun in St Truiden (see below). The cartulary of the abbey of Hélécine, a beneficiary of countess Erlinde and the later countess Juliana of Duras, referred to this lordship in some charters as if it were a county.

== Two main lines ==
The ancestor of the main line of the counts of Duras was Count Otto of Loon, a brother of Count Emmo of Loon, the ancestor of the counts of Loon. In other words, both brothers were referred to at the same time as counts "of Loon" (Borgloon). Otto's son Giselbert was the first certain count of Duras, and was also, like his father, subadvocatus of St Truiden. His son was another Count Otto.

- Count Otto, brother of Count Emmo of Loon, and also described as a "Count of Loon", was succeeded by his son...
- Count Gilbert of Duras, was succeeded by his son...
- Otto II, Count of Duras

Otto II was succeeded by his daughter and her husband...

- Countess Juliana (described as filia of Otto), and her husband (described as "gener", brother-in-law or son-in-law, of Otto), Count Godfried of Montaigu and Clermont. They were succeeded by their son...
- Gilles, Count of Montaigu, who died without heir and was succeeded by his brother...
- Conon, Count of Montaigu and Duras

The county of Duras was then left to the Prince-Bishopric of Liège, which sold it to the counts of Loon.

== Earliest medieval records ==
In the time of Otto, in the 11th century, county names and forms were still developing into the more stable entities of the ancien regime. Only the 14th century Gesta continuator calls Otto a Count of Duras, and Baerten doubted that he was thought of this way in his own time.

However, Otto was assigned as the first certain subadvocatus of St Truiden, under the first superior advocatus, the Duke of Limburg, assigned by the Abbey's overlords, the Bishops of Metz. The new constitutions of these positions were described in charters produced in this period.

There is no medieval evidence of a similar double advocatus system before this time, nor of anyone inheriting the older version of the advocatus office. Baerten believed that an hereditary tradition going back before Otto should however be assumed. On this basis he reasoned, as had others such as Mantelius before him, that Otto must have married the heiress of a previous advocatus of St Truiden. Alternatively, the earlier advocates of St Truiden may for example have originally been assigned one-by-one by their clerical superiors in Metz.

Jean Baerten speculated that the county of Duras was built upon the basis of an older and less well-understood county of Avernas, based south of St Truiden in French-speaking Liège Province, the existence of which is mentioned in two 10th-century documents.

== Eleventh century predecessors? ==
The 14th century 3rd continuation of the Gesta of St Truiden named some counts of Duras in the eleventh century. A widow named Herlendis (d. after 2 November 1023) was described as Countess of Duras in a record of a benefaction she made about 1021. A similar confirming record made by her son Count Godfried appears in the cartularium of St Truiden. Her name appears as an ancestor, or at least predecessor, in various donations made by the family of the counts of Duras in the twelfth century, including one confirmed by Henry II of Leez, Prince-Bishop of Liège, in 1164. However, these documents refer to Erlendis not as a countess of Duras, but as a countess of Jodoigne.

As another coincidence, one of the members of this family was also, like the counts of Duras, an advocatus of the Abbey.

Herlendis and her husband, whose name is not known, had at least three children:

- Adalbero (d. before 1021), died before his mother. He is named as the eldest son in the Gesta. Notably, despite this, when he died he held not a lordship, but the clerical office of primicerius in Metz. It is noted by Vanderkindere and others that the name Adalbero was traditional for members of the House of Ardenne who joined the clergy, implying that either Herlendis or her husband were relatives of that dynasty.
- Godfried (d. after 1023), a count, but the whereabouts of his county is unknown.
- Giselbert (d. after 1023). The under-advocatus of Saint Trudo's Abbey.

It was proposed in the 18th century by the Hasselt antiquarian Jan Mantel (Mantelius) that the county was eventually inherited by a granddaughter of Herlendis, who married a member of the family of the Counts of Loon.

- Oda (d. before 1101), married Otto de Looz, who became Count of Duras, son of Giselbert, Count of Looz. The Gesta of St Truiden also describes her as the mother of Gilbert/Giselbert the first definite count of Duras. Note that in fact, no medieval document names her parents or ancestors.

This hypothesis continues to be widely accepted, most importantly by Jean Baerten: Oda inherited the county which became Duras, and her husband Otto became Count of Duras by marriage. Her family also is supposed to have inherited the subadvocacy of the abbey.

The connection of Herlendis to Jodoigne means that "Countess Alpaidis" would also probably be a predecessor and ancestor.

== Sources ==
- Baerten, Jean, ‘Les origines des comtes de Looz et la formation territoriale du comté’, in: Revue belge de philologie et d'histoire 43 (2 parts; 1965) 459–491, 1217–1242. On persee: part 1, part 2.
- Baerten, Jean, Het Graafschap Loon (11de - 14de eeuw), (Assen 1969). pdf
- Boeren (1938) De oorsprong van Limburg en Gelre en enkele naburige heerschappijen pdf available
- De Borman, Camille, Le livre des fiefs du comté de Looz sous Jean d'Arckel google.
- Gorissen, P., ‘Omtrent de wording van het graafschap Loon’, in: Jaarboek van de Vereniging van Oudheidkundige en geschiedkundige kringen van België: 32e zitting Congres van Antwerpen 27-31 juli 1947 (1950-1951).
- Mantelius, Joannes, Historiae Lossensis libri decem, (Liège 1717). google
- Ulens, R., "Les origines et les limites primitives du comté de Duras" Bulletin de la Société Scientifique & littéraire du Limbourg 50 (1936) pp. 49–71.
- Vaes, Jan, De Graven van Loon. Loons, Luiks, Limburgs (Leuven 2016)
- Wolters, Mathias J., Notice Historique sur l’Ancien Comté de Duras en Hesbaie, Gyselinck, 1855 (available on Google Books)
- Zeller, Thibaut, "La maison de Duras en Hesbaye : les pilliers de pouvoir d’une parentèle comtale (XIe -XIIe siècles)", l'Annuaire d'histoire liégeoise, 37, (2007-2008), pp. 33–57.

=== Primary sources ===
- Gestorum Abbatem Trudonensium Continuatio Tertia: Koepker (ed.) MGH SS Vol.10 382; =de Borman (ed.) Vol.2 ; =Lavigne (trans.) 228-229 (pdf).
- Piot, Ch., ed., (1870) Cartulaire de l'abbaye de Saint-Trond, Vol.1 . archive.org
- Reusens, (1893) "Chartrier de l’abbaye d’Heylissem", Analectes pour servir à l’histoire ecclesiastique de la Belgique . archive.org

50°50′9.5″N 5°9′10.7″E
