= Louis I of Loon =

Count of Loon

Louis I, Count of Loon
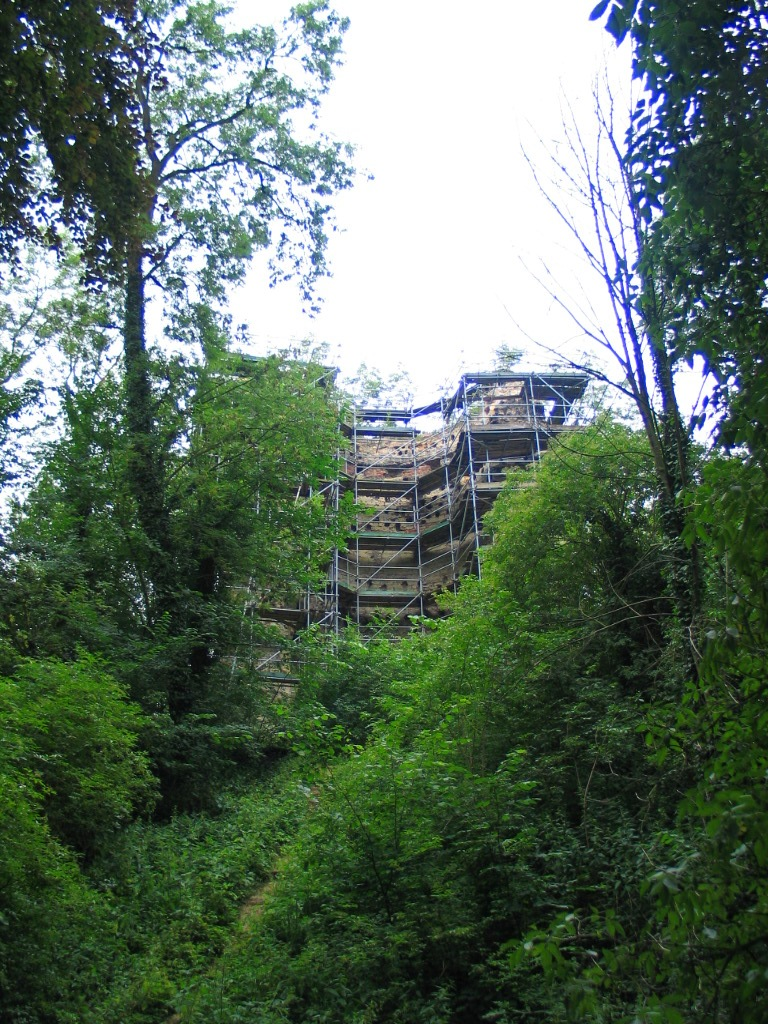
- The castle of the Counts of Loon in Brustem
- Born: after 1107
- Died: 11 August 1171; Chapel of the infirmary in Borgloon
- Noble family: House of Loon
- Spouse: Agnes of Metz
- Issue Detail: Agnes; Gérard II, Count of Looz
- Father: Arnold II, Count of Loon
- Mother: Aleide?

Louis I (Latin Ludovicus, German Ludwig, Dutch Lodewijk; died 11 August 1171) was the Count of Loon, now in modern Belgium, and Burgrave of Mainz, in Germany. He inherited these offices from his father. He also established the County of Rieneck apparently based upon the Burgrave's lands.

== Life ==
He was the son of Arnold II, Count of Loon, and his wife whose name may have been Adeleide or Agnes. He first appears in a record as an adult together with his father in 1135. Arnold II died in 1139, and Louis was his heir, appearing that year as count of Rieneck. In 1141 he appeared in his role as advocate of Saint James abbey in Liège.

He was also advocate of Averbode Abbey, which his family had founded. In 1154, he donated Laethof Manor in Heusden-Zolder to the abbey.

Louis married Agnes of Metz, the daughter of Folmar V, Count of Metz, and Matilda of Dagsburg. Based upon her ancestry, Louis was able to successfully lay claim to Kolmont and Bilzen.

Agnes commissioned Hendrik van Veldeke to write his "Life of Saint Servatius".

Louis I served as burgrave of Metz from 1159 to 1162.

Via his wife, Louis also had a claim on the Duchy of Luxembourg, however, he could not realize this claim.

In 1160, the count of Duras attacked Louis's city of Brustem (now part of Sint-Truiden), which lay close to Duras and Sint-Truiden. He laid it and the lands around it waste. In 1170, Louis constructed a castle in Brustem which the new young count of Duras, Gilles, saw as an aggressive act, seeing Brustem as being within his own county. However, Gilles, Count of Duras, successfully called in the help of the abbey and citizens of Sint-Truiden and together they defeated Louis' army. Louis died during this battle, on 11 August 1171. He was buried in the chapel of the infirmary in Borgloon. His grave can still be found there.

== Issue ==
Louis and Agnes had the following children:

- Agnes, married Otto I of Wittelsbach, Duke of Bavaria
- Arnold, died young
- Gerard, Count of Loon
- Hugo, married and had issue
- Bonne, married Walter Berthout, Lord of Mechelen and Grimbergen
- Imagina, married Godfrey III, Count of Louvain
- Lauretta (died before 1193), married Gilles, Count of Duras (divorced 1174), grandson of Otto II, Count of Duras. Later married to Theobald I of Bar.

Louis was succeeded as Count of Loon by his son Gerard.

== Notes ==
Louis I of Loon House of Loon Born: after 1107 Died: 11 August 1171
Preceded by Arnold II	Count of Loon; 1139–1171	Succeeded by Gerhard
