= Arnold I of Loon =

Arnold I, Count of Loon
- Born: 1045
- Died: 1130 (aged 84–85)

Arnold I (b. about 1045 – d. about 1130), Count of Loon from about 1079, son of Emmo, Count of Loon, and Suanhildis, daughter of Dirk III, Count of Holland, and his wife Othelandis.

He was an ally of Henry of Verdun and Otbert, both bishops of Liège. In 1078, he endowed the collegiate churches of Huy and of St. John at Liège.

In 1088, he negotiated at the request of Bishop Henry of Verdun to end a conflict in the abbey of Sint-Truiden where the bishop and emperor Henry IV had appointed rival abbots. As a result of his diplomacy, the emperor transferred the authority of the abbey from Henry I, Duke of Lower Lorraine, to Arnold. Arnold forced Henry and his ally Godfrey of Bouillon, to withdraw from the monastery.

The domain of Arnold expanded with the County of Rieneck by his marriage to Agnes of Mainz, daughter of Gerhard I, Count of Rieneck, and Helwig von Bliescastel. Sources disagree on their number of children, but they are believed to include:

- Arnold II, Count of Loon. He is distinguished from his father of the same name by historians who note records for counts named Arnold or Arnulf between 1179 and 1141, which seems too long to be one person. The first Arnold must have died between 1125 when Count Arnold appears in a record with his son also named Arnold, and 1135, when a new Count Arnold appears with his own son and successor Louis.
- Gertrude van Loon (1100–1154), married to Hugo XI, Count of Dagsburg. Their son was Hugo XII, Count of Dagsburg, who married Luitgarde, widow of Godfrey II, Count of Louvain. She was daughter of Berengar II of Sulzbach, and sister of Gertrude von Sulzbach, wife of Conrad III of Germany, and Bertha, wife of Manuel I Comnenus, the emperor of Byzantium. Their granddaughter was Gertrude of Dagsburg, wife of Theobald I, King of Navarre.
- Agnes van Loon (born c. 1100), married Gerhard IV, Count of Jülich
- Beatrix van Loon (died after 1132), married Arnout III, Count of Aarschot and had issue.

Another son who appears in some older publications, Gerard, did not exist. He appears in books such as the oldest edition of Belgian National Biographies, based upon a charter of 1101. Baerten (1969 p. 40 footnote 2) describes this as a mistake caused by modern edition with a wrongly placed comma, and gives references to the literature. Although the confusion about this non-existent "Gerard" remains, Arnold is now generally understood to have been succeeded upon his death by his son Arnold as Count of Looz.

== Sources ==
- J.-J. Thonissen, "Arnoul Ier et Arnoul II", Biographie nationale de Belgique, vol. 1 (Brussels, 1866) link
- Vanderlinden, H., "Le tribunal de la paix de Henri de Verdun (1082) et la transformation de la principauté de Liège", in Mélanges Henri Pirenne, 1926
- Baerten, Jean (1969), Het Graafschap Loon (11de – 14de eeuw) (PDF)
