= Arnout III of Aarschot =

Arnout III (1080-after 1136), Count of Aarschot, son of Arnout II, Count of Aarschot, and his wife whose name remains unknown. Arnout is sometimes confused with his father, especially in regard to the blood shedding at Aachen in 1115.

Arnout supported the founding of the Averbode Abbey in 1134, part of the Archdiocese of Mechelen-Brussels, that was made possible by donations by Arnold II, Count of Looz, the Abbey of Sint-Truiden, the lords of Aarschot and Diest, and Godfrey III, Count of Louvain. In at least two documents, Arnout was not referred to as a count.

Arnout married Beatrix of Looz, daughter of Arnold I, Count of Looz and sister of his fellow benefactor of the Averbode Abbey. Arnout and Beatrix had four children:

- Arnout IV, Count of Aarschot
- Godfried II (d. after 1152)
- John (d. after 1125), a monk at the Afflighem Abbey. It is possible that he is the renown John whose treatise on de Arte Musica was an early musical analysis that covered the ecclesiastical use of monody.
- Reinier (d. 1175), Archdeacon of Liège.

Upon his death, Arnout was succeeded as Count of Aarschot by his son and namesake.

== Sources ==
Hasselt, A. H. C. van, Les Belges aux Croisade, Jamar, 1846 (available on Google Books)

The History of the Country of Aarschot
