= Louis III of Looz =

Louis III, Count of Looz (died 15 May 1243), also known as Ludwig (Latin Lodevicus) was Count of Loon and of Rieneck. He was the son of Gerard, Count of Rieneck (died 1216), and Cunegonde von Zimmern, who was in turn the son of another Count Gerard who was also count of both Rieneck and Loon (died 1191).

Upon the death of his father in 1216, and his uncles Louis II, Count of Loon, and Henry, Count of Looz, both dying in 1218, it was another uncle Arnold III, Count of Looz, who became count of both Loon and Rieneck, while Louis III became Burgrave of Mainz. Arnold III however died childless, and Louis subsequently also became count in both Rieneck, now in Germany, and Loon, now in Belgium.

Loon eventually became a county of Louis III's younger brother Arnold IV, Count of Loon, and the division of the two counties became permanent. Louis III had children and his descendants continued to be counts of Rieneck into the 16th century.

Vaes (pp. 149–150) reports that Louis married Adelheid of Henneburg and they had the following children:

- Ludwig III, count of Rieneck (1243–1289). Married Udehilt of Grumbach and Rothenfels. Their son Ludwig was also count, but had no children.
- Gerhard IV, count of Rieneck (died 1295). Married Adelheid of Hohenlohe-Brauneck. Ancestors of later counts of Rieneck.
- Siboto, count of Rieneck (died after 1251).
- Heinrich II, count of Rieneck (died between 1267 and 1271).

== Sources ==
- Baerten (1965), "Les origines des comtes de Looz et la formation territoriale du comté", Revue belge de philologie et d'histoire, 43 (2): 468
- Vaes, Jan (2016), De Graven van Loon. Loons, Luiks, Limburgs, ISBN 9789059087651
