= Arnold II of Loon =

Count of Loon
- Reign: c. 1135 – 1146
- Predecessor: Arnold I, Count of Loon
- Successor: Louis I, Count of Loon
- Died: 1146
- Spouse: Aleide?
- Issue: Louis I, Count of Loon; Gerard, Count of Rieneck; Gottschalk; Imagine, Abbess of Susteren; Jean de Looz, Seigneur de Ghoer
- Father: Arnold I, Count of Loon
- Mother: Agnes von Mainz

Arnold II (or Arnulf, Arnoul) (died 1146), Count of Loon, son of Arnold I, Count of Loon, and Agnes von Mainz, daughter of Gerhard I, Count of Rieneck, and Helwig von Bliescastel. He is distinguished from his father of the same name by historians who note records for counts named Arnold or Arnulf between 1179 and 1141. The first Arnold must have died between 1125 when Count Arnold appears in a record with his son also named Arnold, and 1135, when a new Count Arnold appears with his own son and successor Louis.

Between these two dates, in 1129, Gislebert, Count of Duras, sought to seize the property of the Abbey of Sint-Truiden. (Giselbert was a cousin, the grandson of his namesake Giselbert, Count of Loon.) A war developed between Giselbert and the supporters of the abbot Radulphe, whose allies included Count Arnold of Loon (Arnold I and/or II), Théoger, Bishop of Metz, Alexander I of Jülich, Bishop of Liege, and Waleran II, Duke of Lower Lorraine. Gislebert's supporters included his brother-in-law Godfrey the Bearded, Count of Louvain, and Thierry of Alsace, Count of Flanders. The decisive battle took place on 7 August 1129 at Wilderen where Gislebert and his allies were defeated, but peace did not return in 1131.

He founded the Abbey of Averbode, which belonged to the Order of Canons Regular of Prémontré that St. Norbert had created.

Arnold had an outstanding reputation among his contemporaries, frequently being the arbiter in disputes between neighbors. In particular, he succeeded in bringing about a reconciliation between Dirk VI, Count of Holland, and Giselbert's son Otto II, to get Herman van Horne, grandson of Emmo, Count of Loon, recognized as Bishop of Utrecht. He was welcomed with great distinction at the court of the emperors of Germany, and his name frequently appears among the witnesses mentioned in the charters granted by Emperors Henry IV, Henry V and Lothair II, and King of Germany Conrad III.

According to a document which is considered spurious by scholars, Arnold married Aleide. Arnold is thought to have had five children:

- Louis I, Count of Loon
- Gerard (d. after 1138), Count of Rieneck
- Gottschalk (d. after 1138)
- Imagine, Abbess of Susteren in 1174
- Jean de Loon, Seigneur de Ghoer, married to Sophie.

Arnold was succeeded as Count of Loon by his son Louis.

== Ancestors ==
Ancestors of Arnold II of Loon

4. Emmo van Loon
2. Arnold I, Count of Looz
20. Arnulf, Count of Holland
10. Dirk III, Count of Holland
21. Lutgardis of Luxemburg
5. Suanhildis of Holland
11. Othelandis
1. Arnold II
6. Gerhard I, Count of Rieneck
3. Agnes von Mainz
14. Gottfried III Count of Bliesgau
7. Helwig von Bliescastel
15. Mathilde de Luxembourg

== Sources ==
- Baerten, Jean (1969), Het Graafschap Loon (11de - 14de eeuw) (PDF)
- J.-J. Thonissen, "Arnoul Ier et Arnoul II", Biographie nationale de Belgique, vol. 1 (Brussels, 1866) link
- Verdonk, Henk (2005) Graaf Arnold van Loon (eind 11de-begin 12de eeuw): Was er één of waren er twee?; "Tesi samanunga vvas edele unde scona. Liber Amicorum Theo Coun", Limburg – Het Oude Land van Loon 84, pp. 73-81.
