= Hériman de Duras =

Hériman (Bovo) de Duras (born after 1006), son of Otto I, Count of Duras, and Oda, daughter of Giselbert I, Count of Duras. The children and grandchildren of Hériman were closely tied to the Cathedral of Our Lady and St. Lambert in Liege (Cathédrale Notre-Dame-et-Saint-Lambert) as well as the Counts of Chiny.

Several of Hériman's descendants are identified with Waha, a Belgian village located in the Province of Luxembourg in Wallonia. Legend says that, in the 10th century, Waha was part of the territory of a Count Immon, who possibly was Emmo, Count of Hesbaye.

The name of Hériman's wife is unknown. He and his wife had five children:

- Simon de Waha, Canon at Liège, St. Lambert (1103)
- Julien (died 1127 of after), Seigneur de Waha, married Mathilde de Fronville. They had one child Guy, Canon at Liège, St. Lambert (1118–1147)
- Hugel de Waha, Châtelain de Mirwart, married Clementia de Chiny, daughter of Arnold I, Count of Chiny, and Adélaïs de Roucy. Hugel and Clementia had one son Lambert, Canon at Liège, St. Lambert (1196–1223).
- Bovo, Canon at Liège, St. Lambert (1108)
- Jean, Abbot of St. Hubert.

No further information on Hériman or his descendants appears in the literature.

== Sources ==
- Wolters, Mathias J., Notice Historique sur l’Ancien Comté de Duras en Hesbaie, Gyselinck, 1855 (available on Google Books)
