= Godefroi, Count of Montaigu =

Count of Montaigu, Clermont, and Duras (died 1161)

Count Godfried (died 1161) was a Lower Lotharingian noble. He was count of Montaigu and Clermont by inheritance, and Count of Duras by virtue of his marriage. He was also seigneur (lord) of Rochefort, and advocate of Dinant.

His father was Lambert, Count of Montaigu and Clermont.

Godfried married Juliane, daughter of Otto II, Count of Duras. They had five children:

- Gilles, Count of Montaigu, Clermont and Duras
- Pierre de Montaigu (d. 1185 or after), canon at Saint-Lambert, Liège
- Conan II, Count of Montaigu, Clermont and Duras
- Gerberge de Montaigu (d. after 29 June 1206), married to Wery II de Walcourt
- Clarissa de Montaigu.

Upon the death of Godfried, his son Gilles inherited all three counties. Pierre is also listed as a Count of Montaigu, but as he died before his older brother, it is not clear that he ever actually held the title. After Conon's death, his brother-in-law Wery II de Walcourt became Count of Montaigu and Clermont, whereas Gérard II, Count of Looz, became the Count of Duras.

== Sources ==
- C. G. Roland (1893), "Les seigneurs et comtes de Rochefort", Annales de la Société archéologique de Namur, 20: 63–141.
- Wolters, Joseph Mathias, Notice Historique sur l’Ancien Comté de Duras en Hesbaie, Gyselinck, 1855 (available on Google Books)
