= Gilles, Count of Montaigu =

Count of Montaigu

Gilles (Ægidius) (died before 1193), was Count of Montaigu and Clermont, through his father Count Godefried of Montaigu, and Count of Duras, through his wife Juliane, daughter of Count Otto of Duras. Gilles was also Seigneur of Rochefort, Jodoigne and advocate of the abbey of Saint-Trond. He was thus an important noble in Lower Lotharingia.

In 1174, Gilles also married Laurette de Looz, daughter of Louis I, Count of Looz, and his wife Agnes von Metz. They divorced childless in 1176.

Gilles contracted leprosy, giving up most of his lands to his brothers Conon and Pierre. Gilles was succeeded as Count of Montaigu, Clermont and Duras by his brother Conon, possibly as early as 1175. In a charter dated 1175 donating property to the Knights Hospitaller, Gilles is referred to as former count and his brothers Pierre and Conon as Counts of Montaigu and Duras, respectively. He kept the lordship of Jodoigne and was then at least once referred to as count of Jodoigne. (His mother had also referred to herself as countess of Jodoigne.)

Leprosy, however, was not the end of his military life, according to Gislebert of Mons, as he and his brother Conon fought the duke of Louvain, for seizing Duras and Jodoigne, his only remaining allod. They were able to recover Duras. Moreover, he writes of his capture in the town of Namur by Baldwin V, Count of Hainaut, who held him captive for a long time.

Gilles and his brothers prepared to go on crusade, though Gilles probably never went ahead with this plan. None of the brothers had heirs, and so arrangements were made for their possessions.

== Sources ==
- Hanon de Louvet (1941) Histoire de la Ville de Jodoigne
- Wolters, Joseph Mathias, Notice Historique sur l’Ancien Comté de Duras en Hesbaie, Gyselinck, 1855 (available on Google Books)
- C. G. Roland (1893), "Les seigneurs et comtes de Rochefort", Annales de la Société archéologique de Namur, 20: 63–141.
