= Gerard III =

Gerard III may refer to:

- Gérard III, Count of Rieneck (d. 1216)
- Gerard III, Count of Guelders (d. 1229)
- Gérard de Dainville (d. 1378), Bishop of Cambrai as Gerard III

== See also ==
- Gerhard III, Count of Holstein-Rendsburg (d. 1340)
