= Giselbert II of Duras =

Count Giselbert of Loon or Duras
- Other titles: Deputy Advocate of Saint Trudo’s Abbey
- Died: Before 1138
- Spouses: 1. Gertrud 2. Oda, daughter of Otto II, Count of Chiny
- Issue: Otto II, Count of Duras; Conan of Duras; Giselbert of Duras; Gerard, Abbot of Saint Trudo’s; Thierry, Archdeacon of Liège; Bruno, Canon at Liège, Saint Lambert; Daughter (name unknown, mother of Alexander II, Bishop of Liège); Daughter (name unknown, mother of Arnulf van Kortessem)
- Father: Otto I, Count of Duras
- Mother: Oda

Count Giselbert (or Gilbert) of Loon or (later) Duras (d. before 1138), was the deputy advocate (subadvocatus) of Saint Trudo’s Abbey. He was son of Count Otto, the younger brother of Count Emmo of Loon. Giselbert was the first person to be named in contemporary documents as a count of Duras.

Giselbert was involved in several conflicts which involved the abbey, as mentioned in several parts in the Abbey's Gesta or chronicle.

Apart from the Gesta, much of what we know about Giselbert is from the charters that he witnessed, which also gives insight as to his relationship with the Counts of Namur, a family into which he eventually married. Emperor Henry IV confirmed donations made by Henry I, Count of Durbuy, son of Albert II, Count of Namur, to the Church of Saint James in Liège, as witnessed by Giselbert. The emperor also confirmed the claim of Albert’s family to Saint Begga's Collegiate Church in Andenne.

Giselbert married twice. His first wife was Gertrud, of unknown parentage. His second wife was Oda, daughter of Otto II, Count of Chiny, and his wife Alix, daughter of Albert III, Count of Namur. Giselbert and Gertrud had eight children:

- Otto II, Count of Duras
- Conan of Duras (Appears in Wolters 19th century writer, who cites Mantelius and Butkens, 17th century writers)
- Giselbert of Duras
- Gerard (d. 1174), Abbot of Saint Trudo’s
- Thierry (d. 1183 or after), Archdeacon of Liège
- Bruno (d. 1177 or after), Canon at Liège, Saint Lambert
- Daughter, name unknown, mother of Alexander II, Bishop of Liège (1164-1167)
- Daughter, name unknown, mother of Arnulf van Kortessem.

Wolters identifies Julienne, daughter of Otto II, as an additional daughter of Giselbert and Gertrud, but this is unlikely as her husband and their sons inherited the countship of Duras. Upon his death, Giselbert was succeeded as Count of Duras by his son Otto.

== Sources ==
- Baerten, Jean, ‘Les origines des comtes de Looz et la formation territoriale du comté’, in: Revue belge de philologie et d'histoire 43 (2 parts; 1965) 459-491, 1217-1242. On persee: part 1, part 2.
- Baerten, Jean, Het Graafschap Loon (11de - 14de eeuw), (Assen 1969). pdf
- Gorissen, P., ‘Omtrent de wording van het graafschap Loon’, in: Jaarboek van de Vereniging van Oudheidkundige en geschiedkundige kringen van België: 32e zitting Congres van Antwerpen 27-31 juli 1947 (1950-1951).
- Mantelius, Joannes, Historiae Lossensis libri decem, (Liège 1717). google
- Ulens, R., "Les origines et les limites primitives du comté de Duras" Bulletin de la Société Scientifique & littéraire du Limbourg 50 (1936) pp.49-71.
- Vaes, Jan, De Graven van Loon. Loons, Luiks, Limburgs (Leuven 2016)
- Wolters, Mathias J., Notice Historique sur l’Ancien Comté de Duras en Hesbaie, Gyselinck, 1855 (available on Google Books)
- Zeller, Thibaut, "La maison de Durras en Hesbaye : les pilliers de pouvoir d’une parentèle comtale (XIe -XIIe siècles)", l'Annuaire d'histoire liégeoise, 37, (2007-2008), pp.33-57.

=== Primary sources ===
- Gestorum Abbatem Trudonensium Continuatio Tertia: Koepker (ed.) MGH SS Vol.10 382; =de Borman (ed.) Vol.2 ; =Lavigne (trans.) 228-229 (pdf).
