= Sophia (wife of Géza I of Hungary) =

Sophia Queen of Hungary (1065–1072)

Sofia van Loon
- Born: c. 1044/46
- Died: before 1075
- Spouse: Géza I of Hungary
- Issue: Coloman, King of Hungary; Prince Álmos
- Father: Emmo of Loon
- Mother: Swanhilde of Friesland
- Religion: Roman Catholic

Sophia of Loon (c. 1044/46 - b. 1075; Hungarian: Loozi Zsófia; Dutch: Sofia van Loon; French: Sophie de Looz) was the Queen of Hungary, the first wife of Géza I of Hungary. According to the old Hungarian sources, she was the daughter of the Limburg duke Arnulf, the son of Rudolph, duke of Limburg, and countess Luitgard of Namur. In reality Arnulf might be Arnulf, Count of Holland, the father of Dirk III (the maternal great-grandfather of Sophia of Loon) or Arnulf of Haspinga (her paternal grandfather); and Luitgard might be Luitgarde of Namur, her paternal grandmother; thus, Rodolph was her paternal great-grandfather (see the ancestry chart below), who can possibly be identified with Richwin II, Castelijn of Baelen-Limbourg (1033).

== Family ==
She may have been the daughter of Emmo of Loon, the third count of the County of Loon, and his wife Swanhilde, the daughter of Dirk III, Count of Holland, and Othelindis (c. 985-1043/44), who in turn was the daughter of Bernard I of Saxony.

== Marriage and issue ==
Sometime around 1062 or 1063, Sophie married the Hungarian prince Géza, the later Géza I of Hungary. It is believed that they may have met in the court of the Holy Roman Emperor, where Géza was sent as a hostage in 1062–1063, at which time he must have been unmarried in line with the custom of not sending married men as hostages to foreign courts.

Sophia probably died soon after her husband became king (1074-1077), since Géza in 1075 had already another wife, the Byzantine princess Synadene.

According to the sources, they had seven children, but not all of them reached adulthood.

Sophia and Géza had the issue:

- Kálmán (c. 1065/70-1116), King of Hungary
- Álmos (c. 1068/71-1127, in Byzance), claimant to the throne
- Katalin (may also be the daughter of Géza's second wife, Synadene)

Only these names survived. In addition to them, two more sons died in infancy, and probably three daughters reached the adulthood. One of them became the mother of ispán Bors, a claimant to the Hungarian throne (exiled to Byzantium), while another daughter became the mother of Iván, a claimant to the Hungarian throne (executed in c. 1130).

== Ancestry ==
Ancestors of Sophia (wife of Géza I of Hungary)

8. Rudolph of Loon, duke of Limburg ?
4. Arnulf of Haspinga
9. Lutgarde
2. Emmo of Loon
10. Albert I, Count of Namur
5. Luitgarde of Namur
11. Ermengarde
1. Sofia van Loon
12. Arnulf, Count of Holland
6. Dirk III, Count of Holland
13. Lutgardis of Luxemburg
3. Suanhildis countess of Frisia
14. Bernard I of Brandenburg
7. Othelindis (c. 985-1043/4)
15. N. Vladimirovna

== Bibliography ==
- Bertényi, I. , Diószegi, I. , Horváth, J. , Kalmár, J., Szabó P. (2004): Királyok Könyve. Magyarország és Erdély királyai, királynői, fejedelmei és kormányzói. Budapest: Helikon Kiadó.
- Nógrády, Árpád, Pálffy, Géza, Velkey, Ferenc (2007): Magyar uralkodók. Debrecen: Tóth Könyvkereskedés és Kiadó Kft. p. 14.
- Sokop, Brigitte (1993): Stammtafeln europäischer Herrscherhäuser. 3. Aufl. Böhlau, Wien, ISBN 3-205-98096-4.
- Magyar Katolikus Lexikon
