= Château de Duras =

Belgian castle

Coordinates: 50.835°N 5.152°E

Duras Castle
- Belgium
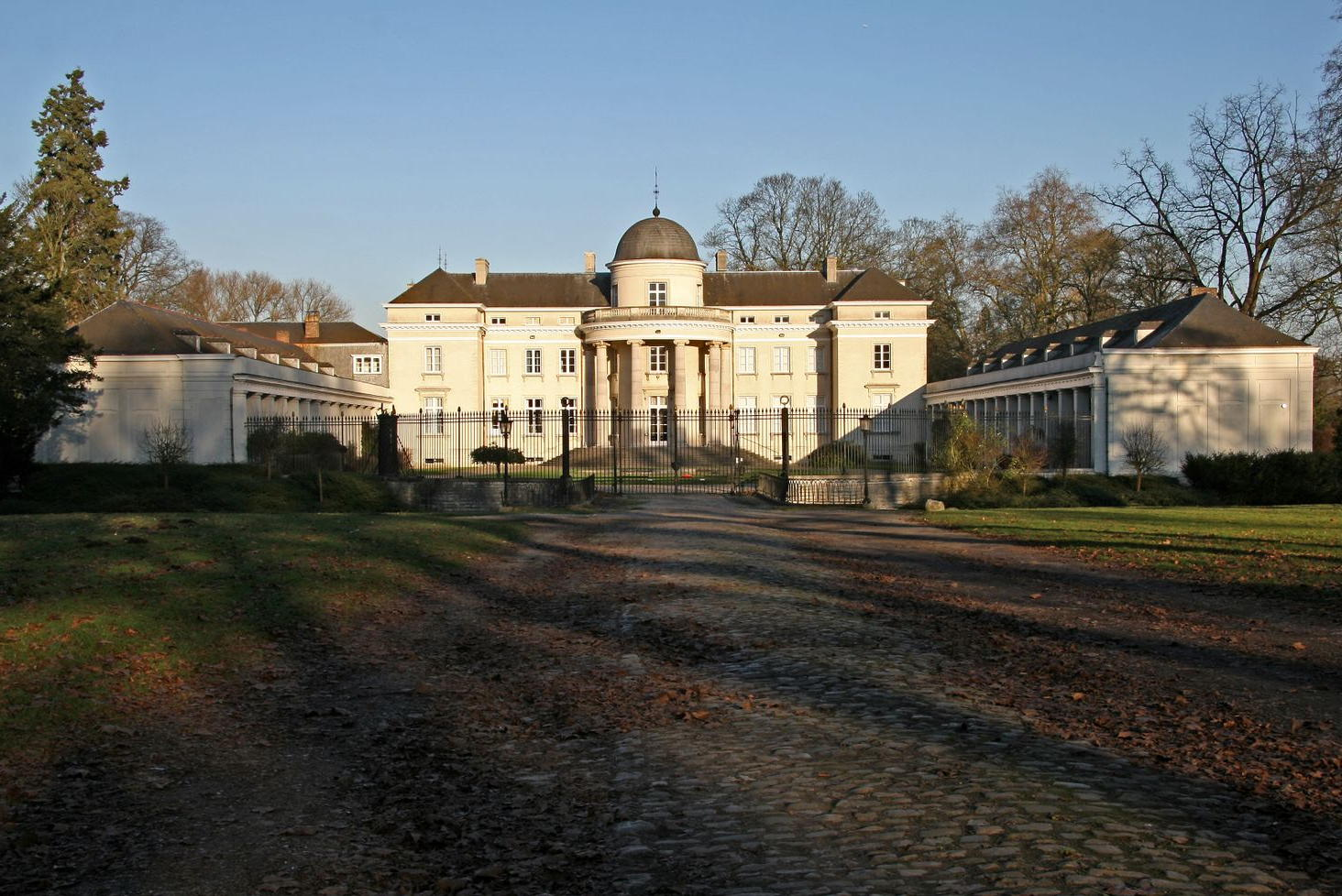
- Château de Duras

Site information
- Type: Castle

Site history
- Built: 1787-1789

The Château de Duras (Castle of Duras) in Duras, a half hour walk to the north of Sint-Truiden in Belgium, is built in the Classical style .

This Belgian castle was built between 1787 and 1789 and is located in a beautiful area. The castle was built on the location of the original castle of the Counts of Duras, which was built in 1102. It was Otto of Looz, count of Duras and “sous-avoué” of Sint-Truiden, who by his marriage to Ode, the only daughter and heiress of Giselbert, count of Duras, adopted the name and the coat of arms of the counts of Duras and ordered to build the castle in that year. One of his two sons, named Giselbert in honor of his maternal grandfather, married the daughter and heiress of Conon, count of Montaigu and Clermont, and of Ide, the sister of the famous Godfrey of Bouillon, the first king of Jerusalem.

The castle grounds cover an area of more than 100 ha, consisting of woods, meadows, fields and orchards. It also includes a watermill and a farm. It is now a protected monument.

== Architecture ==
The castle was built by the van der Noot family, which includes Henry van der Noot, one of the main landowners in Brabant. Taking place during the time of the French Revolution, the construction of such a landmark was an expensive and risky undertaking. The Dinant architect, G. Henry designed the facade and outbuildings. A striking feature of the façade are the six Ionic columns, which carry a small dome.

For the interior design, G. Henry used many elements commonly found in French buildings and hotels. The large and impressive reception hall is a central feature around which all other rooms are grouped.

== History ==
In 1902 the castle was almost completely destroyed by a fire, but was immediately rebuilt. During World War II the castle was surprisingly not seized by German troops. At the end of the war, in the year 1945, the castle was deliberately hit by a German V-1 flying bomb. Many rooms were badly damaged because of that attack. Between 1960 and 1962 the castle was completely restored with the support of the Belgian State and the Count of Liederkercke. Earlier, in 1948, the castle was already declared as a protected monument.

Count Jean-Joseph van der Noot married Florence Ruys Scheeren, Countess of Elissem near Landen. One of their children, Louise, got married on April 27, 1803, to Prince Louis de Ligne, son of Charles-Joseph, 7th Prince of Ligne and Princess Franziska of the house of Liechtenstein. They had three children including a son, Eugène, 8th Prince of Ligne (1804–1880), who was a distinguished Belgian statesman. After the death of her husband in 1813, Louise married Count Charles d'Outremont, whose family is still in possession of the castle. One of the counts of d'Outremont, M. J. d'Outremont was a grand marshal of the court of king Leopold II of Belgium. Several times a year the castle can be visited by the public, and it can be rented for weddings. During the Christmas period, the castle is a site of a children's interactive immersive theatrical performance "Kerstmagie", during which the visitors, both adults and children can walk through the castle accompanied by fairy tale characters.

== See also ==
- List of castles and châteaux in Belgium
