= Arnout IV of Aarschot =

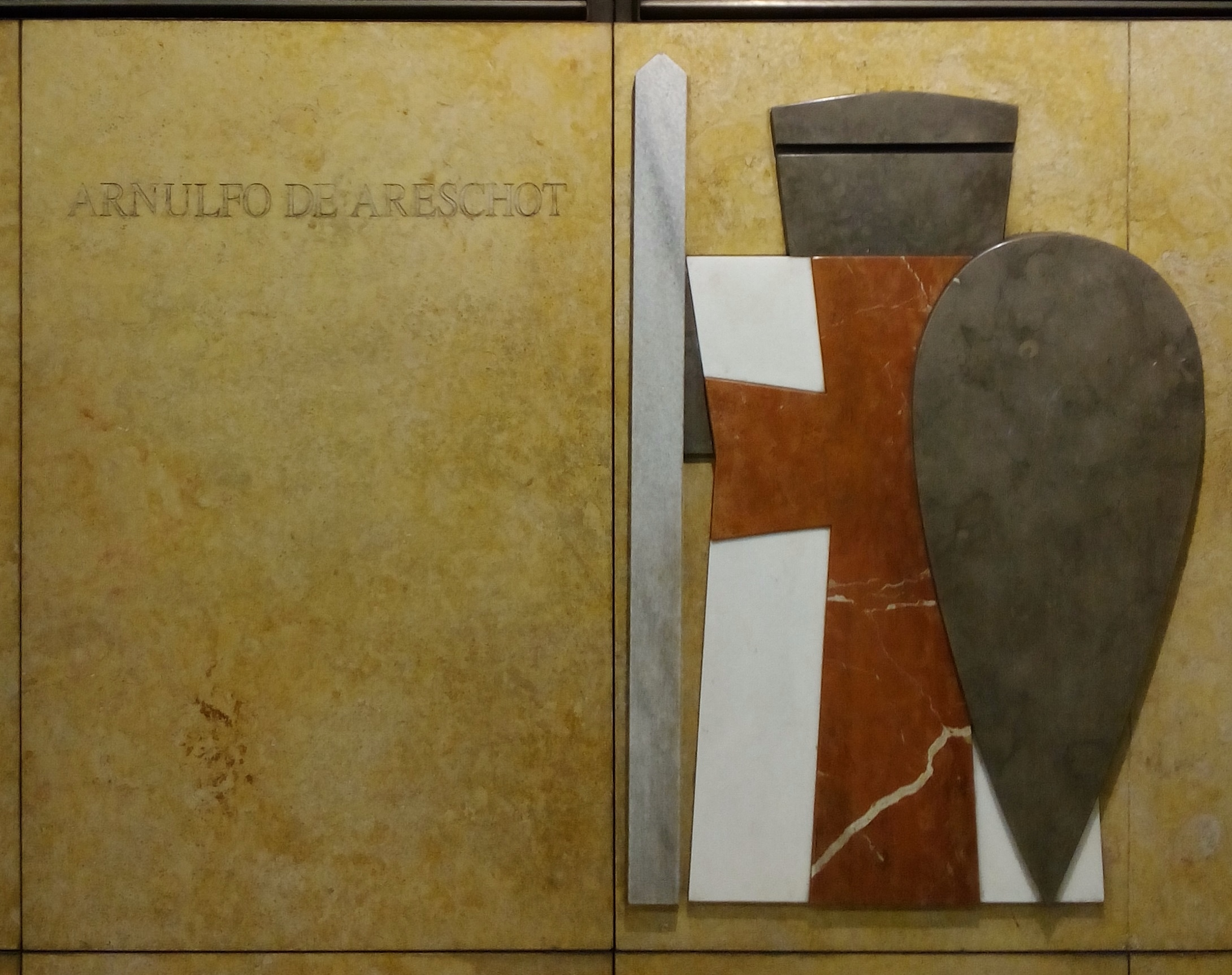
Stylized depiction of Arnout of Aarschot in a Lisbon Metro station

Arnout IV (Arnold of Aerschot) (1100-after 1152), Count of Aarschot, son of Arnout III, Count of Aarschot, and Beatrix of Looz, daughter of Arnold I, Count of Looz.

Arnout, like his grandfather, was the commander of a fleet that delivered Crusaders to fight in the war against the Muslim intruders. He was one of the many captains leading an armada that left Dartmouth in May 1147 to free Lisbon from the Moors in what is known as the siege of Lisbon. Phillips describes Arnulf as a count and the leader of the Rhinelanders in this mission. He is also identified as a nephew of Godfrey of Bouillon with distant ties to the ruling house of Jerusalem. The claim of a familial relationship with Godfrey is dubious.

The battle for Lisbon was one of the few successes of the Second Crusade and is viewed as one of the pivotal battles in the Reconquista. The attacking fleet included as many as 200 ships, and the corresponding rout of the Moors has been described by Runiciman as a “glorious massacre of the infidel.” Many of the Crusaders continued on to the Holy Land.

Arnout was married, although his wife’s name is not known. They had one son, Godfried III, who succeeded him as Count of Aarschot, the last of this comital title until the creation of the Lords and Dukes of Aarschot in the 13th century.

== Sources ==
Runciman, Steven, A History of the Crusades, Volume Two: The Kingdom of Jerusalem and the Frankish East, 1100-1187, Cambridge University Press, Cambridge, 1952 Setton, Kenneth (editor), A History of the Crusades, Volume I. University of Pennsylvania Press, Philadelphia, 1958

Hasselt, A. H. C. van, Les Belges aux Croisade, Jamar, 1846 (available on Google Books)

Phillips, Jonathan, The Second Crusade: Extending the Frontiers of Christendom. New Haven, Connecticut: Yale University Press, 2007 (available on Google Books)

The History of the Country of Aarschot
