= County of Loon =

State of the Holy Roman Empire (1040–1795)

Coordinates: 50°48′N 5°21′E

County of Loon Graafschap Loon (Dutch) Comté de Looz (French)
- 1040–1795
- Coat of arms

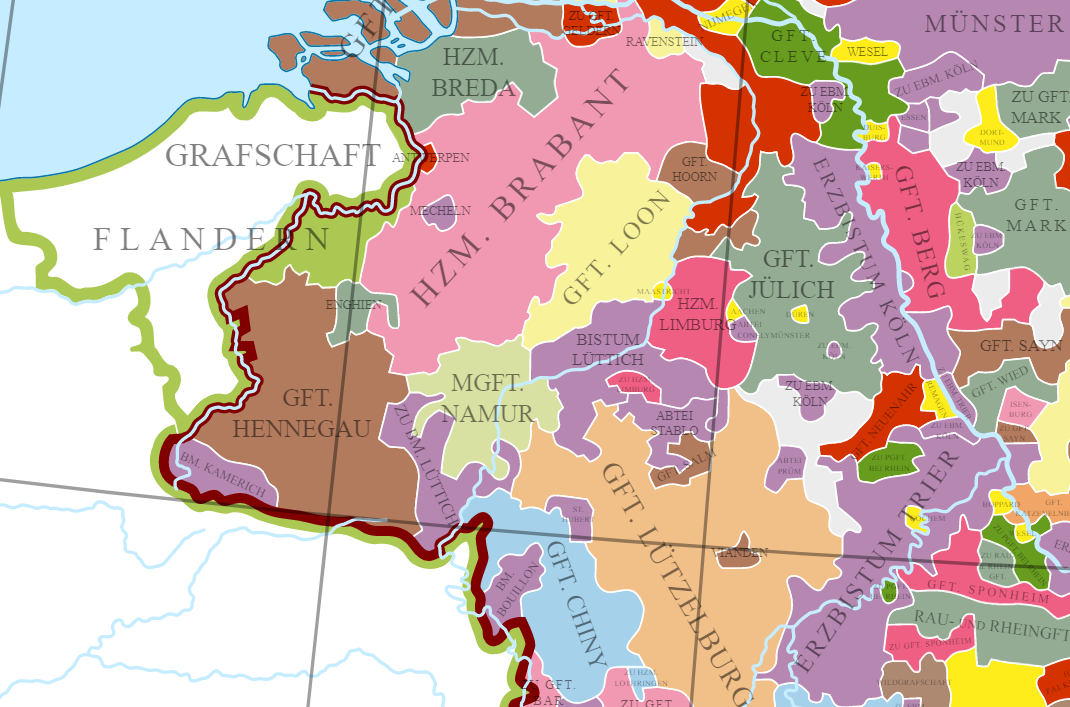
- The Low Countries around 1250, Loon in yellow
- Status: State of the Holy Roman Empire
- Capital: Borgloon; Hasselt
- Common languages: Limburgish
- Religion: Roman Catholicism
- Government: County
- Historical era: Middle Ages
  - First mentioned: 1040
  - Gained Rieneck: 1106
  - Acquired Chiny: 1227
  - To Heinsberg: 1336
  - Incorporated by Liège: 1366
  - Annexed by France: 1795
Preceded by	Succeeded by
Hasbania	Meuse-Inférieure

The County of Loon (Dutch: Graafschap Loon [ˈɣraːfsxɑp ˈloːn], French: Comté de Looz) was a county in the Holy Roman Empire, which corresponded approximately with the modern Belgian province of Limburg. It was named after the original seat of its count, Loon, which is today called Borgloon. During the middle ages the counts moved their court to a more central position in Kuringen, which today forms part of Hasselt, capital of the province.

From its beginnings, Loon was associated with the nearby Prince-bishop of Liège, and by 1190 the count had come under the bishop's overlordship. In the fourteenth century the male line ended for a second time, at which point the prince-bishops themselves took over the county directly. Loon approximately represented the Dutch-speaking (archaic French: thiois) part of the princedom. All of the Dutch-speaking towns in the Prince-Bishopric, with the status of being so-called "Good Cities" (French: bonnes villes), were in Loon, and are in Belgian Limburg today. These were Beringen, Bilzen, Borgloon, Bree, Hamont, Hasselt, Herk-de-Stad, Maaseik, Peer and Stokkem.

Like other areas which eventually came under the power of the Prince Bishop of Liège, Loon never formally became part of the unified lordship of the "Low Countries" which united almost all of the Benelux in the late Middle Ages, and continued to unite almost all of today's Belgium under the ancien regime. The people and places of Loon and other Liège lordships only joined their neighbours when they all became part of France during the French Revolution. After the Battle of Waterloo, they remained connected in the new United Kingdom of the Netherlands. The Dutch speaking or Loon part became part of a province which was given the name Limburg. In 1839, the old territory of Loon was split out to become a smaller province of Limburg within the new Kingdom of Belgium, which was itself created from the southern part of the Netherlands kingdom.

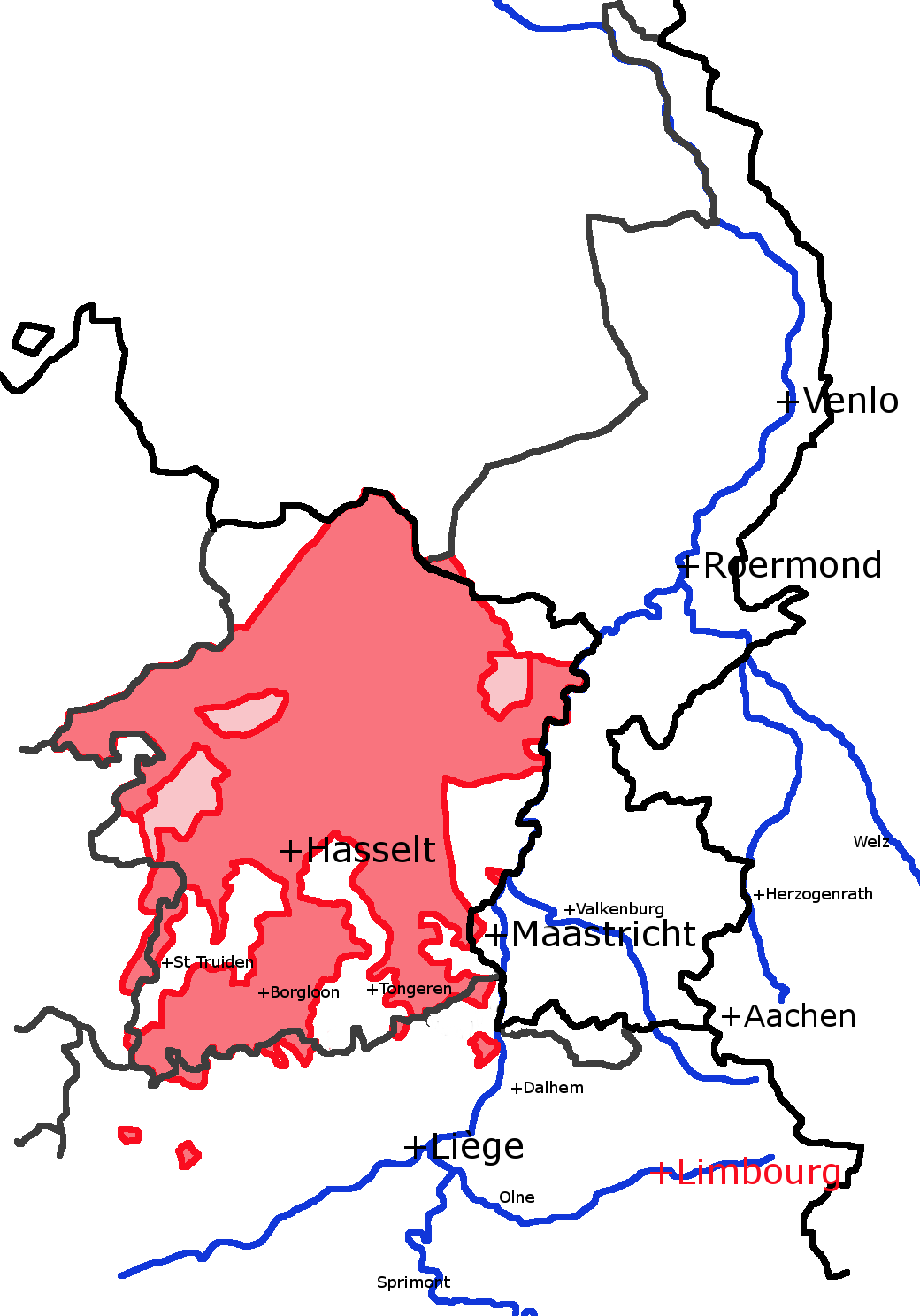
This map shows the medieval County of Loon in red, with modern provincial (grey) and national borders (black). The light red zones were under Loon and another lord jointly.

== Location ==
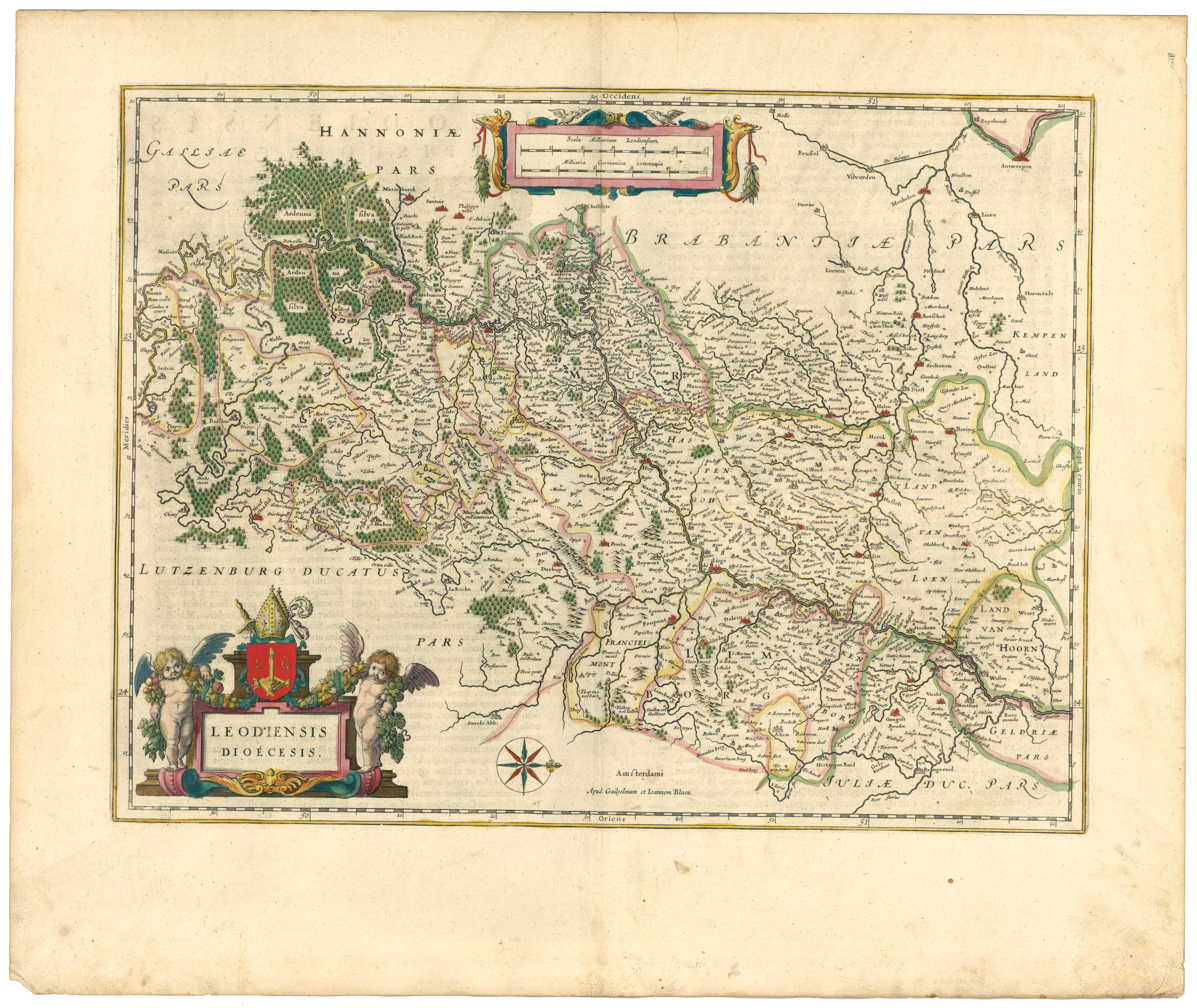
Map of the Bishopric of Liège with 't Land van Loen, Joan Blaeu, Atlas Maior, 1645

From the earliest mentions, the counts of Loon exercised power in three distinct geographical areas, with different medieval names.

- A northeastern part of Loon was in or near the Maas river valley, north of Maastricht, the Frankish Maasau. This included Maaseik and Bree.
- The northwestern part of Loon was in the sandy Kempen region (French: Campine), which the church still referred to by the Roman term Texandria. The counts for example held Tessenderlo, Beringen and Overpelt.
- The southern part was mainly within the Dutch-speaking part of the fertile hills of Haspengouw (French: Hesbaye, Latin: Hasbania) which includes Borgloon itself. Parts of the Dutch-speaking Hesbaye which are now in Limburg were however ruled directly by the Prince-bishop for example around Tongeren.

All three of these components can be found in the modern province of Limburg. However, the early county did not have a simple geographical form. The earliest counts exercised a changing bundle of rights and duties in scattered locations which extended outside the core area, while other landholders also had rights within that area.

== History ==
=== Origins in the 11th century ===
Like many of counties in the region, records mentioning counts of Loon begin in the early 11th century, but these give almost no indication of how the county came to be and what its original boundaries and institutions encompassed. The immediately preceding generations had seen many rebellions, confiscations, and expulsions. In the tenth century, the larger region of Lower Lotharingia had been part of a separate Frankish "middle" kingdom, which however no longer had a king. The eastern and western kingdoms of the Franks, the forerunners of later France and the Holy Roman Empire, contested for control, together with the local magnates. By the year 1000, the area was under lasting control of the eastern kingdom. Royal power in the Haspengouw region was partly in the hands of the prince bishops of Liège, who had been enfeoffed by the emperor of at least two significant Haspengouw counties, Huy, and Brunengeruz. A third one, "Haspinga", came into the hands of the bishop in 1040. There is no consensus over what territory it encompassed, and it may have even included lordship over all or part of Loon.

The first generally accepted count (Dutch graaf, Latin comes, French comte) of Loon was the 11th century Giselbert (modern English and French "Gilbert"). He had two brothers, Count Arnulf, who appears to have been the last secular count of Haspinga, and bishop Balderic II of Liège.

Medieval records note that Giselbert and his brothers were related by blood to local nobility, such as Lambert I, Count of Louvain, and Arnulf of Valenciennes, but they do not give exact relationships. The only medieval source to mention a parent for Count Giselbert is the chronicle of the Abbey of St Truiden, which names his father as Otto. However this was written centuries later and is not considered reliable. Not only is the parentage of Giselbert, Arnulf and Balderic uncertain, but also their connection to the next two count brothers, Emmo and Otto, is uncertain. They may be the sons of either Giselbert or Arnulf.

Another important charter in discussions about the origins of the County of Loon is the 1078 grant by Countess Ermengarde to the Bishop of Liège, of allodial land in key places in the County of Loon. Her possessions cannot be explained by her proposed ancestry, or her known husband, and so it has long been suggested that she must have first married a Count Arnold, because he is presumed to have had no heirs.

In the generation after the 3 brothers Balderic, Gilbert, and Arnulf, Count Emmo became the next count of Loon while his brother Count Otto was advocatus of the Abbey of St Truiden, and the ancestor of the first line of counts of Duras, perhaps through his wife Oda. The county of Duras was inherited by Otto's son Giselbert, and in turn by his son Otto. It eventually became part of Loon, under Count Gerard in the 1190s.

=== 12th century ===
Count Arnold (or Arnulf) I, the son of Emmo, is according to Baerten (1969 p. 40), the first Count of Loon for whom we can discuss any political activity. In 1106 he was able to strengthen his position, when he acquired the possessions of the extinct Counts of Rieneck through his marriage. He also probably built the motte-and-bailey castle which was at Borgloon during the middle ages. His son Arnold II, Count of Loon, founded the Abbey of Averbode. The son and heir of Arnold II was Louis (Dutch Lodewijk) I also witnessed this charter. He became count of Loon, Stadtgraf of Mainz, and count of Rieneck, both in modern Germany. He increased Loon's territory adding Kolmont (now in Tongeren) together with Bilzen. He strengthened the fort there and gave the city freedoms. He also did the same in Brustem in St Truiden, which came under threat as a Loon enclave surrounded by the County of Duras.

Count Gerard (sometimes incorrectly called Gerard "II"), the next count of Loon and Rieneck, fortified Brustem and Kolmont, and moved the capital of the county to Kuringen. There he founded Herkenrode Abbey, for women living according to the Cistercian rule. In Loon, the enduring conflict with his Liège overlords culminated in an 1179 campaign by Prince-Bishop Rudolf of Zähringen, whose troops devastated the county's old capital at Borgloon in 1179. In 1193 Gerard also acquired the county of Duras and advocacy of the abbey of Sint-Truiden, but had to accept Brabant's suzerainty over those lands. This gave him effective power over more lands in the present day southern part of Belgian Limburg. Gerard's son Louis II was heir, but Rieneck went to another son, Gerard, Count of Rieneck. The counties of Rieneck and Loon were re-united eventually under Gerard of Rieneck's son Louis III of Loon, but he then divided them again, giving Loon to his brother Arnold IV.

=== 13th century ===
By marriage, Count Arnold IV acquired the French-speaking County of Chiny in 1227, and brought the main line of the counts of Loon to the high point of its territorial expansion.

=== 14th century ===
The comital male line became extinct with the death of Louis IV of Loon in 1336 and the Loon and Chiny estates were at first inherited by the noble House of Sponheim at Heinsberg with the consent of the Liège bishop. In 1362 Prince-Bishop Engelbert III of the Marck nevertheless seized Loon and finally incorporated it into the Liège territory in 1366.

=== 1366 to 1795 ===
The county remained a separate entity (quartier) within Liège, whose prince-bishops assumed the comital title.

When the bishopric was annexed by Revolutionary France in 1795, the county of Loon was also disbanded and an adjusted version of the territory became part of the French département of Meuse-Inférieure, along with Maastricht and areas east of the Maas river.

=== Legacy ===
After the defeat of Napoleon, the département became part of the new United Kingdom of the Netherlands in 1815, and received its modern name of Limburg as a way for the kingdom to preserve the old title of the medieval Duchy of Limburg, which had been nearby. However, in 1830, Belgium was created, splitting the kingdom, and the position of Limburg and Luxemburg became a cause of conflict. In 1839, under international arbitration, it was finally decided to split Limburg and Luxemburg into their two modern parts. The western part of Limburg, corresponds roughly to the old county of Loon, and became a province of Belgium. Both the Belgian and Dutch parts kept their new name of Limburg.

=== See also ===
- House of Looz-Corswarem

== Counts of Loon ==
- Count Otto (doubted). Named as count of Loon in a much later St Truiden Abbey account of his son Baldric II's installation as Bishop of Liège in 1008. His existence is doubted, for example by Baerten.
- Giselbert (count at least 1015-1036), he and his brother Arnold were both referred to as counts in Haspengouw, and Giselbert was specifically referred to as count with jurisdiction in Borgloon.
- Emmon (d.1078), clearly called "count of Loon" in own lifetime. His brother Otto, an advocate of the Abbey of Sint-Truiden was ancestor of the counts of Duras, but the brothers were collectively called counts of Loon in this generation. It is uncertain who the parents of the two brothers was.
- Arnold I (count at least 1090-1125), son of Emmo, married Agnes, daughter and heiress of Gerard, Burgrave of Mainz. (His contemporary, another Giselbert, the son of his uncle Otto, was count in Duras.)
- Arnold II (count in 1135), son of Arnold I. Founded Averbode Abbey.
- Louis I (1139–1171), son of Arnold II, married Agnes, daughter of Count Folmar V of Metz.
- Gerard (1171–1191), son, married Adelaide, daughter of Count Henry I of Guelders.
- Louis II (1191–1218), son, married Ada, daughter of Count Dirk VII of Holland, also Count of Holland 1203 - 1207, followed by his brothers as guardians of his minor nephews Louis III and Arnold IV:
- Henry (1218), another son of Gerard, died soon after.
- Arnold III (1218–1221), another son of Gerard, also Count of Rieneck, married Adelaide, daughter of Duke Henry I of Brabant.
- Louis III (1221–1227), grandson of Gerard, son of Gerard, Count of Rieneck, also Count of Rieneck 1221 - 1243, renounced Loon in favour of his younger brother.
- Arnold IV (1227–1273), another grandson of Gerard and son of Count Gerard of Rieneck, married Joanna, daughter of Louis IV the Younger, Count of Chiny, also Count of Chiny (as Arnold II)
- John I (1273–1279), son, married Matilda, daughter of William IV, Count of Jülich, secondly Isabelle de Condé
- Arnold V (1279–1323), son, also Count of Chiny 1299 - 1313, married Margaret of Vianden
- Louis IV (1323–1336), son, also Count of Chiny (as Louis VI) since 1313, married Margaret, daughter of Duke Theobald II of Lorraine

Male line extinct, succeeded by the Lords of Heinsberg:

- Theodoric (or Diederik, or Thierry), (1336–1361) son of Gottfried of Sponheim, Lord of Heinsberg and Mechtild of Loon, sister of Count Louis IV, also Count of Chiny and Lord of Heinsberg.
- Gottfried (1361–1362), nephew, son of John of Heinsberg, married Philippa, daughter of Count William V of Jülich, also Count of Chiny and Lord of Heinsberg, sold the comital title to:
- Arnold VI of Rumigny (1362–1366), also Count of Chiny (as Arnold IV), claimant, renounced in favour of Liege,
