= Trudo =

Belgian saint

Saint Trudo
- Saint Trudo in an initial O, from a 15th-century German manuscript. He has a tonsure and holds a model of his church at Sarchinium.

Apostle of Hesbaye
- Died: c. AD 698
- Venerated in: Roman Catholic Church; Eastern Orthodox Church
- Feast: 23 November
- Patronage: Hesbaye, Sint-Truiden

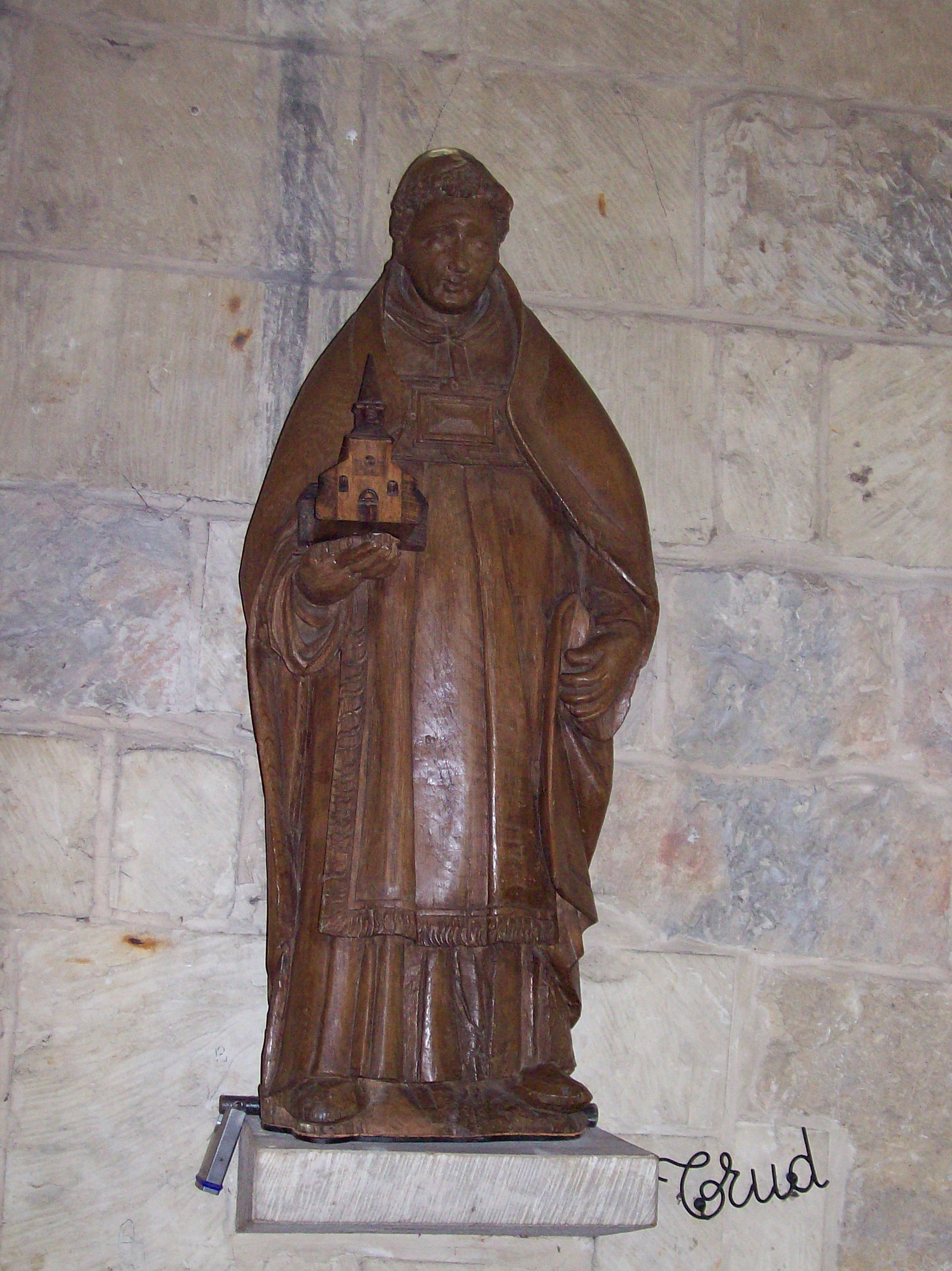
Statue of Trudo in Église Saint-Gangulphe, Sint-Truiden

Saint Trudo (d. c. AD 698; also Tron, Trond, Trudon, Trutjen, Truyen, Truiden, Truin) was a saint of the seventh century. He is called the "Apostle of Hesbaye" (a region mainly now in the Belgian provinces of Walloon Brabant, Liège, and Limburg). His feast day is celebrated on 23 November.

Devoted from his earliest youth to the service of God, Trudo came to St. Remaclus, Bishop of Liège (Acta Sanctorum, I Sept., 678) and was sent by him to Chlodulph, Bishop of Metz. Here he received his education at the Church of St. Stephen, to which he always showed a strong affection and donated his later foundation. After his ordination he returned to his native district, preached the Gospel, and built a church at Sarchinium, on the River Cicindria. It was blessed about 656 by Theodard of Maastricht, in honour of Sts. Quintinus and Remigius. Disciples gathered about him and in the course of time a monastery developed, the later Sint-Truiden Abbey. The convent for women, established by him at Odeghem near Bruges, later also bore his name (Gallia Christiana, Paris, 1887, V, 281) (see Sint-Truiden).

== Veneration ==
After his death he was buried in the church he had erected himself. A translation of his relics, together with those of St. Eucherius, Bishop of Orléans, who had died there in exile in 743, was made in 880 by Franco, Bishop of Liège. On account of the threatened inroads of the Normans the relics were later hidden in a subterranean crypt. After the great conflagration of 1085 they were lost, but again discovered in 1169, and on 11 August that year an official recognition and translation were made by Bishop Rudolph III. On account of these translations the dates 5 and 12 August, and 1 and 2 September, are noted in the martyrologies. The Analecta Bollandiana (V, 305) gives an old office of the saint in verse.

His Life was written by Donatus, a deacon of Metz, at the order of his bishop, Angibram (769-91); it is called Vita Trudonis confessoris Hasbaniensis (Life of Trudo, confessor of Hesbaye'). It was rewritten by Theodoric, Abbot of St Trond (d. 1107).
