= Godfried III of Aarschot =

Godfried III (1130 – after 8 January 1176), Count of Aarschot, son of Arnout IV, Count of Aarschot.

Godfried was recorded as stealing artifacts (medietatem de Hancines) from the Abbey of St. Medard at Soissons which were recovered, resulting in his excommunication.

Godfried married twice, first to Ada of Louvain, daughter of Gossuin of Louvain, and second to Alix d’Albret, daughter of Albert de Bretagne. No information about either wife or their families is available. No children are recorded.

In order to finance his ventures, heretofore unknown, he sold the County of Aarschot to Godfrey III, Count of Louvain, in 1172. Assertions have been made that this was to support the Crusades, but actual timelines do not seem to fit any activities of the cross, so it is unclear what his motives may have been. Claims that Godfried participated in the Third Crusade seem dubious. Godfrey's descendants were the Dukes of Brabant, named Henry I, II and III, and the latter named his son, Godfrey of Brabant as the first Lord of Aarschot, beginning an aristocratic lineage of Dukes of Aarschot that continues to this day.

== Sources ==
- The History of the Country of Aarschot
