= Arnout II of Aarschot =

Arnout II (d. after 1115), Count of Aarschot, son of Arnout I, Count of Aarschot (d. after 1060).

Arnout commanded one of the fleets which left on the First Crusade in 1096. His fleet presumably carried the army of Hugh, Count of Vermandois, since the other crusader armies travelled by land. Other sources say he travelled with Godfrey of Bouillon, although Murray does not identify him as a member of Godfrey's army. He apparently survived the crusade and was at Aachen in 1115 with Emperor Henry V at an Easter celebration, when his fingers began to bleed, a portent of shedding blood through disputes with the princes.

Arnout was married but the name of his wife is unknown. He and his wife had at least three children:

- Arnout III, Count of Aarschot
- Godfried I van Aarschot
- Oda van Aarschot, married to Gerard van Grimbergen.

Upon his death, Arnout was succeeded by his son and namesake as Count of Aarschot.

== Sources ==
- Hasselt, A. H. C. van, Les Belges aux Croisade, Jamar, 1846 (available on Google Books)
- Murray, Alan V., "The Army of Godfrey of Bouillon, 1096–1099: Structure and Dynamics of a Contingent on the First Crusade", Revue belge de philologie et d'histoire 70/2 (1992), pp. 301-329.
- The History of the Country of Aarschot
