= Henry, Count of Looz =

Henry (died 2 August 1218), Count of Looz and Count of Duras, son of Gérard II, Count of Looz, and Adelaide of Gelderland, daughter of Henry I, Count of Guelders, and Agnes of Arnstein, daughter of Louis III of Arnstein.

Henry was Canon of St. Lambert in Liège, Provost of the Franciscans in Maastricht, and Provost of St. Alexander in Aschaffenburg. Henry was Count of Looz for a few days in 1218, but died of poisoning. He married Mechtild, daughter of Frederick III, Count of Vlanden.

Henry and Mechtild had one daughter:

- Isabella van Loon, married Diedrick van Renesse, great-great grandfather to John III, Lord of Renesse.

He was succeeded as Count of Looz by his brother Arnold, and was the last recorded Count of Duras.

== Sources ==
- Wolters, Joseph Mathias, Notice Historique sur l’Ancien Comté de Duras en Hesbaie, Gyselinck, 1855 (available on Google Books)
- Baerten, J., "Les origines des comtes de Looz et la formation territoriale du comté", Revue belge de philologie et d'histoire 43 (2), 1965
