= Otto II of Duras =

Otto II (d. 1147) was a count of Duras, and advocatus of the nearby abbey of St Truiden. Duras and St Truiden are in the modern province of Belgian Limburg. His parents were Count Giselbert II of Duras and his wife Gertrud.

Otto married Berthe of Valenciennes, daughter of Yolande of Guelders, daughter of Count Gerard I of Guelders. Yolande was first married to Count Baldwin III of Hainaut, and was mother to Count Baldwin IV of Hainaut.

Otto and Berthe are thought to have had one child who survived to adulthood, Otto's successor:

- Juliane (d. 1164), married first Godfried, count of Montaigu, Duras and Clermont, and second Enguerrand, possibly the count of Orbais.

In Sint-Truiden charter 51 (Piot Vol.2) Countess Juliane was described as Otto's filia, and her Juliane's husband Count Godfried was described as his gener. This could mean "son-in-law" or "brother-in-law". (In the 19th century Wolters for example identified Juliane as Otto's sister, but this seems unlikely given the succession of the counts of Duras.)

Juliane and Godfried had five children, the eldest of which was Gilles, count of Montaigu, Duras, and Clermont, who married Lauretta, daughter of Count Louis I of Loon. Their third son Conan was also count of Duras. None of Juliane's sons had male heirs, and the family inheritance split up after their deaths.

== Sources ==
- Baerten, Jean, ‘Les origines des comtes de Looz et la formation territoriale du comté’, in: Revue belge de philologie et d'histoire 43 (2 parts; 1965) 459-491, 1217-1242. On persee: part 1, part 2.
- Baerten, Jean, Het Graafschap Loon (11de - 14de eeuw), (Assen 1969). pdf
- Hanon de Louvet (1941) Histoire de la Ville de Jodoigne
- Piot, Cartulaire de l'abbaye de Saint-Trond, Vol.2. https://archive.org/details/cartulairedelabb01sainuoft/
- C. G. Roland, Les seigneurs et comtes de Rochefort, Annales de la Société archéologique de Namur 20 (1893) https://archive.org/details/annalesdelasocie20soci/page/63
- Ulens, R., "Les origines et les limites primitives du comté de Duras" Bulletin de la Société Scientifique & littéraire du Limbourg 50 (1936) pp.49-71.
- Vaes, Jan, De Graven van Loon. Loons, Luiks, Limburgs (Leuven 2016)
- Wolters, Mathias J., Notice Historique sur l’Ancien Comté de Duras en Hesbaie, Gyselinck, 1855 (available on Google Books)
- Zeller, Thibaut, "La maison de Durras en Hesbaye : les pilliers de pouvoir d’une parentèle comtale (XIe -XIIe siècles)", l'Annuaire d'histoire liégeoise, 37, (2007-2008), pp.33-57.

=== Primary sources ===
- Gestorum Abbatem Trudonensium Continuatio Tertia: Koepker (ed.) MGH SS Vol.10 dmgh.de; =de Borman (ed.) Vol.1 Vol.2; =Lavigne (trans.) 228-229 (pdf).
