= Gerard, Count of Rieneck =

Gerard (died 1216), Count of Rieneck, son of Gerard, Count of Loon, and Adelaide of Gelderland, daughter of Henry I, Count of Guelders, and Agnes of Arnstein, daughter of Louis III of Arnstein.

Virtually nothing is known about his life other than his children who succeeded their uncles as Counts of Looz.

Gerard married Cunegonde von Zimmern, daughter of Sibodo III, Count of Zimmern. Gerard and Cunegonde had five children:

- Louis III, Count of Looz and Count of Rieneck
- Arnold IV, Count of Looz and Count of Chiny
- Gerard (d. before 1272)
- Berthold, Canon in Würzburg
- Imagina, married to Goswin III, Herr von Born.

Gerard was succeeded as Count of Rieneck by his brother Arnold, but the county went eventually to his son Louis, and his descendants. The county of Loon eventually went to his younger son Arnold and his descendants.
