= Emmo of Loon =

Count of Loon

Count Emmo, Immo or Emmon (d. before 17 Jan 1078) is one of the first known counts of Loon (or Looz) in the region of modern Belgian Limburg. Before him one more count is known with confidence, Count Giselbert (or Gilbert), but it is not certain that Giselbert was Emmo's father. Verhelst for example has proposed that he was his uncle, and that Giselbert's brother Count Arnulf was father of Emmo and also a count of Loon.

His mother is named clearly as Ludgarde of Namur, a sister of Albert the count of Namur, in a work about the life of her cousin, Bishop Arnulf of Soissons.

On several occasions, Emmo and his brother Otto were jointly referred to as counts of Loon, though Otto's descendants became counts of the neighbouring castle of Duras. Emmo's family was probably descended from the 10th century families who, like them, had the rank of count in the local Hesbaye region. In 966 the lord of Gelmen was also named Count Immo.

As shown by Verdonk, Emmo married Suanhildis, who was probably the daughter of Dirk III Hierosolymita, a count in West Frisia, and an ancestor of the counts of Holland. Emmo and Suanhildis had four children:

- Sophie (d. 1065) married Géza I, King of Hungary. It is uncertain whether the subsequent dynasty of Kings of Hungary were the descendants of Sophie or Géza’s second wife.
- Arnold I, Count of Looz
- Thierry (Dirk) de Looz (d. after April 1125), Count of Horn.
- Mechthilde, Abbess of Munsterbilzen

Emmo was succeeded as Count of Loon by his son Arnold.

== Sources ==
- Jean Baerten, Het graafschap Loon (11de-14de eeuw), Assen,1969 (link)
- Souvereyns; Bijsterveld (2008), "Deel 1: De graven van Loon", Limburg - Het Oude Land van Loon (link)
- Vanderkindere, Léon (1902), La formation territoriale des principautés belges au Moyen Age (link), Vol.2, Ch. 9, p. 128
- Verdonk, "De herkomst van de heren van Herlaer" link
- Verhelst, Karel (1985), "Een nieuwe visie op de omvang en indeling van de pagus Hasbania (part 2)", Handelingen van de Koninklijke Zuidnederlandsche Maatschappij voor Taal- en Letterkunde en Geschiednis, 39
