= Gerard of Loon =

12th-century Count of Loon

Count Gerard (or Gerhard) of Loon (died 1191), was son and successor of Louis I, Count of Loon, and Agnes of Metz. He was count of Loon (in modern Belgium) and of Rieneck (in Germany). Because of a widespread misunderstanding concerning a document from 1101, some generations earlier, he is sometimes wrongly referred to as the second Gerard in this dynasty, "Gerard II".

== Biography ==
Gerard became count in difficult times. His father Louis, who ravaged the territory of Sint-Truiden, was attacked and beaten near Brustem on July 28, 1171, by the citizens of Sint-Truiden and Gilles, Count of Duras. They then besieged his castle of Loon (now Borgloon), killing Count Louis on 11 August. The assault was prevented by the arrival of reinforcements form Louis’ son-in-law Godfrey III, Count of Louvain, and a truce was concluded. Gerard and his mother went to emperor Frederick Barbarossa in Aachen to obtain compensation, but the citizenry of Sint-Truiden successfully defended their claim.

Falling ill, Gerard fulfilled a vow to go make a pilgrimage to Jerusalem. On his return, he found the county in full disorder. His brother Hugo had begun to fortify the village of Brustem, which had caused strife for many years. Finally in 1175, he granted the inhabitants of Brusthem the laws and freedom enjoyed by the citizens of Liege.

He went to war against Rudolf of Zähringen, Prince-Bishop of Liège. On July 31, 1180, he and his knights routed the episcopal army in Tongeren, plundering and burning the cathedral. In retaliation, Rudolf burned the castle and the town of Loon, as well as the village and the Abbey of Munsterbilzen and the castle at Montenaeken. Several villages and sixteen churches were completely destroyed. Gerard sued for peace through the mediation of Henry the Blind, Count of Luxembourg, and Engelbert I, Count of Berg.

Gerard moved his court to Kuringen, near the Belgian city of Hasselt located in the Flemish Region in the province of Limburg, and in 1182, he founded the Abbey of Herkenrode, entrusted to the Cistercian Order. He built a heptagonal donjon at Rieneck, perhaps inspired by the donjon of Borgloon.

Gerard joined the Third Crusade led by emperor Frederick Barbarossa, King Philip Augustus of France and the English King Richard the Lionheart. He was killed on 2 November 1191 at the headquarters of Saint-Jean d'Acre. His body was returned to Loon and buried at Herkenrode, where he rests alongside his wife and children.

In 1135, Gerard married Adelaide of Gelderland, daughter of Henry I, Count of Guelders, and Agnes of Arnstein, daughter of Louis III of Arnstein. Gérard and Adelaide had at least eight children:

- Louis II, Count of Looz (d. 1218)
- Gerard, Count of Rieneck (d. 1216), ancestor of the counts of Loon and Rieneck through his two sons.
- Henry (d. August 1218), Count of Looz and Duras, married Mechtild, daughter of Frederick III, Count of Vianden
- Arnold III (d. by 1221), Count of Looz and Count of Rieneck, married Adelaide, daughter of Henry I, Duke of Brabant
- Thierry de Loos, (d. 1207–1209), Seneschal of 'Romania' and Duke of Nicomedia, in 1206
- Guillaume de Loos, killed in 1206 at the battle of Rousion, Thrace
- Imagina, married to William V, Châtelain de Saint-Omer
- Matilda, Abbess of Munsterbilzen.

== Mistakenly proposed earlier Gérard I ==
Gérard I is a wrongly proposed Count of Loon (Dutch), or Looz (French), who was supposedly mentioned in an 1101 charter of Emperor Henry IV concerning the return of the town of Andenne by Albert III, Count of Namur. There is general consensus that he did not exist, but this misconception meant that the later Gerard is often referred to as "Gerard II".

The charter, or at least one modern version of it (old manuscripts do not use modern commas), mentions a list of people including "Gerardus Comes de Looz, Arnoldus et frater ejus Theodoricus, Gislebertus filius Comitis Ottonis, Comitis de Duras" meaning Gerard is specifically a count of Looz or Loon, whereas Arnold, mentioned next (with his known relatives Theoderic, Gislebert, and Otto) would have been expected from other records.

In an 1866 article on Arnold I, Count of Looz in the Belgian National Biography, Jean-Joseph Thonissen concluded from this that he died between 1098 and 1101, succeeded by his eldest son Gérard, followed by his younger son Arnold II. Although this statement still causes misunderstandings, these conclusions are not generally believed, and current historians agree on 1126 as the correct date of the death of Arnold I, with his son Arnold II succeeding him directly.

It was pointed out by J. Daris in 1867 that there was another copy of the charter of 1101 which called Gérard simply a count, and Arnold was the one described as "Comes de Looz".

An example of a recent article still using the wrong reading of the 1101 charter, is that of Donald C. Jackman, noted by Verdonk. (Jackman replied in his "Geldern, Looz, and Public Succession".)

== Bibliography ==
- Biographie nationale, par Académie royale des sciences, des lettres et des beaux-arts de Belgique, Tome VII, par H. Thiry-Van Buggenhoudt, Bruxelles, 1866
- Baerten, Jean (1969), Het Graafschap Loon (11de - 14de eeuw) (PDF)
- Vaes, Jan (2016), De Graven van Loon. Loons, Luiks, Limburgs, ISBN 9789059087651
- J. Daris, "Notes Chronologiques sur les Comtes de Looz", Bulletin de la Société Scientifique et Littéraire du Limbourg 8 (1867), page 97.
- J.-J. Thonissen, "Arnoul Ier et Arnoul II", Biographie nationale de Belgique, vol. 1 (Brussels, 1866) link
