= Borgloon =

Borgloon: Looz (French)
- City and municipality
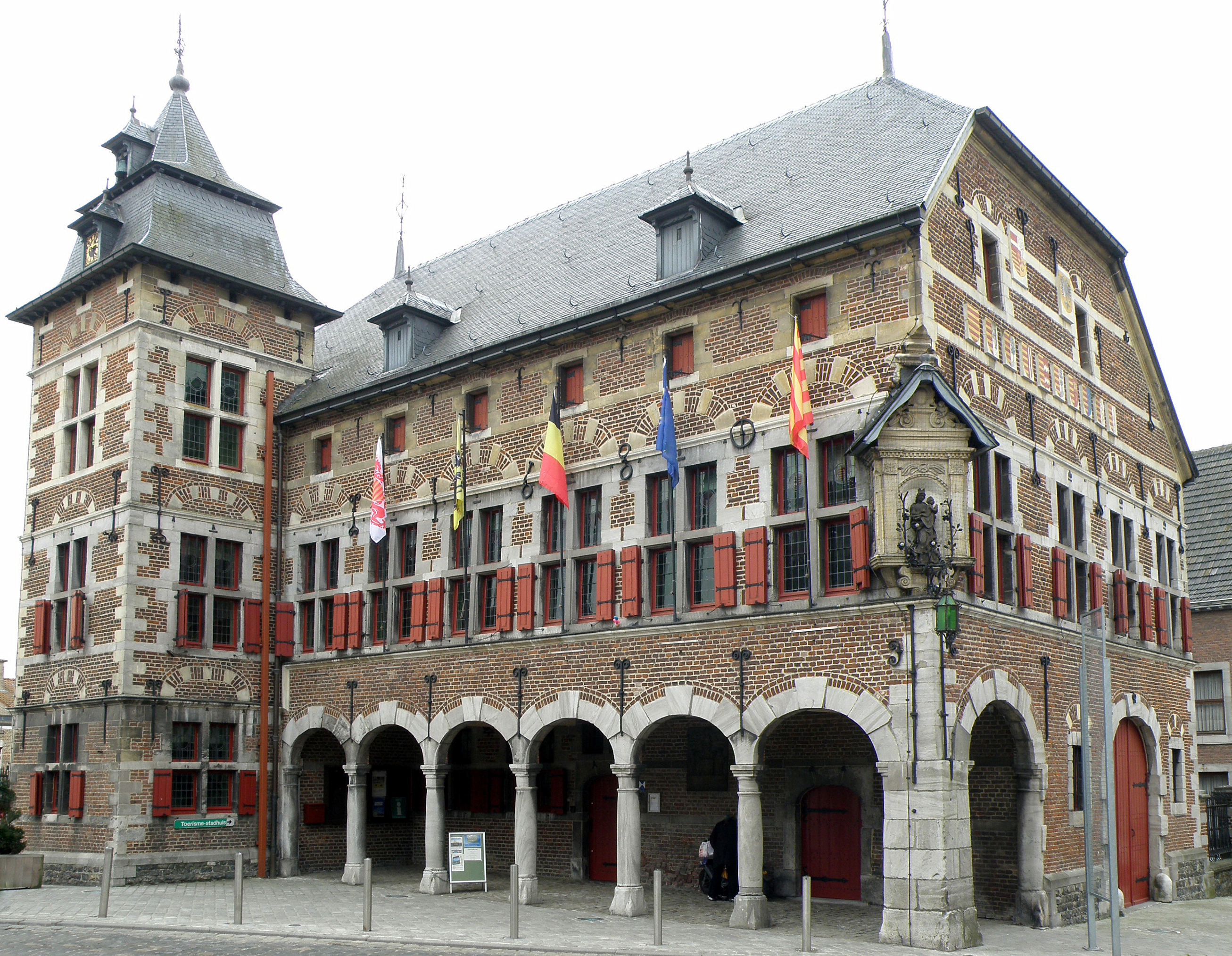
- Borgloon city hall

- Flag Coat of arms

- Location of Borgloon in Limburg
- Interactive map of Borgloon
- Location in Belgium
- Coordinates: 50°48′N 05°20′E
- Country: Belgium
- Community: Flemish Community
- Region: Flemish Region
- Province: Limburg
- Arrondissement: Tongeren

Government
  - Mayor: Jo Feytons (Open Vld-Stroop)
  - Governing parties: OpenVLD-Stroop, Vooruit

Population (2018-01-01)
  - Total: 10,697
- Postal codes: 3840
- NIS code: 73009
- Area codes: 012
- Website: www.borgloon.be

Borgloon (Dutch pronunciation: [ˈbɔr(ə)xˌloːn]; French: Looz, French pronunciation: [lo]; Limburgish: Loeën) is a former municipality and city located in the Belgian province of Limburg. On January 1, 2006, Borgloon had a total population of 10,697. The total area is 51.12 km^{2} (19.74 sq mi) which gives a population density of 209 inhabitants per square kilometre (540 inhabitants/mi^{2}). Borgloon gave its name to the former county of Loon and was its capital until 1200.

The municipality includes the following 13 sub-municipalities: Bommershoven, Borgloon proper, Broekom, Gors-Opleeuw, Gotem, Groot-Loon, Hendrieken, Hoepertingen, Jesseren, Kerniel, Kuttekoven, Rijkel, and Voort.

== History ==
Historical affiliations

County of Loon 11th century–1366
Prince-Bishopric of Liège 1366–1789
Republic of Liège 1789–1791
Prince-Bishopric of Liège 1791–1795
French Republic 1795–1804
French Empire 1804–1815
Kingdom of the Netherlands 1815–1830
Kingdom of Belgium 1830–present

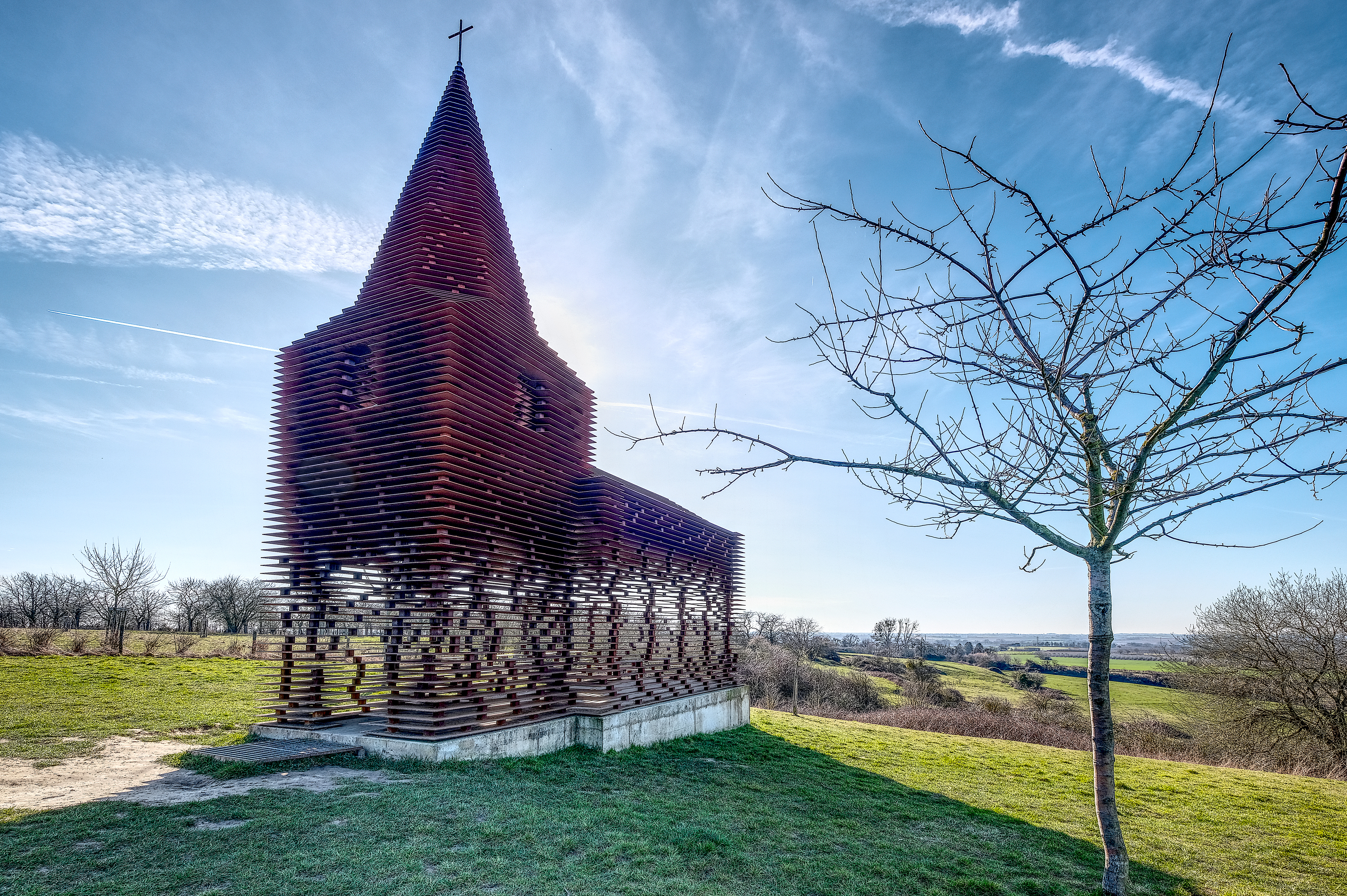
Ghost Church artwork near Borgloon
