= Sint-Truiden Abbey =

Former Benedictine monastery in Belgium

Coordinates: 50.8164°N 5.1867°E

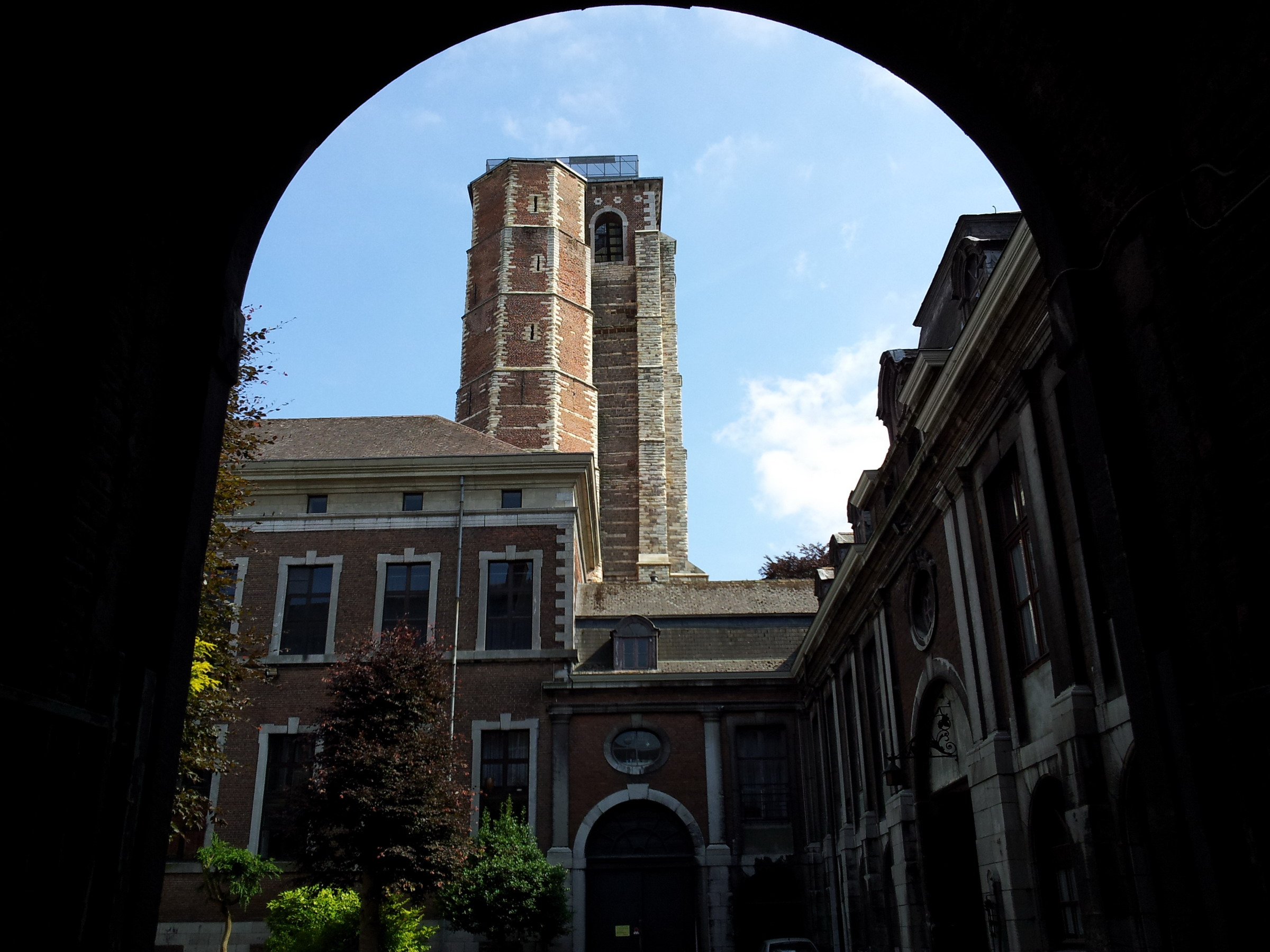
Gateway to the abbey complex

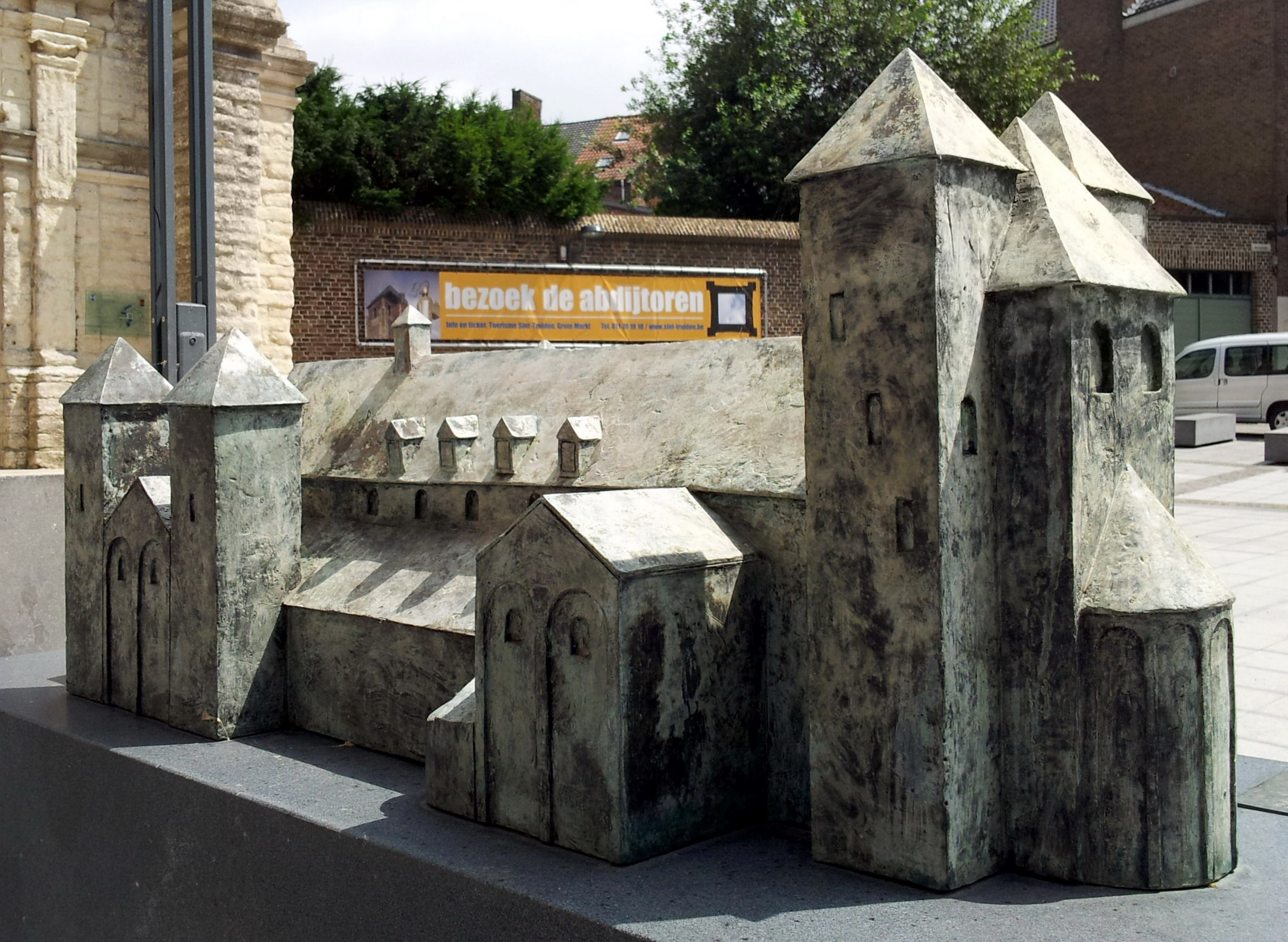
Bronze model of the former abbey

Sint-Truiden Abbey or St Trudo's Abbey (Dutch: Abdij van Sint-Truiden, Abdij van Sint-Trudo; French: Abbaye de Saint-Trond) is a former Benedictine monastery in Sint-Truiden (named after Saint Trudo) in the province of Limburg, Belgium. The abbey was founded in the 7th century and was one of the oldest and most powerful in the Low Countries. The town of Sint-Truiden grew up around it. The great Romanesque abbey church, dedicated to Saint Remaclus and Saint Quintin, was demolished in 1798, four years after the suppression of the abbey.

== History ==
=== Foundation and early years ===
The monastery was founded by Saint Trudo in about 655, on a spot known as Sarchinium (Zerkingen). After his death and canonisation the monastery became a place of pilgrimage (the dedication of the abbey to Saint Trudo did not however take place until the 12th century). Other early members of the community were also declared saints, among them Eucherius of Orléans and Libert of Saint-Trond. In the 9th century, probably soon after 817, the monastery adopted the Rule of St. Benedict. In 883 it was laid waste by the Normans.

The first monastery probably comprised a stone church and wooden conventual buildings. In about 950 Bishop Adalbero I of Metz, who was also abbot of Sint-Truiden, ordered the construction of a new three-aisled church 50 metres long and 24 metres wide, which for the time was enormous. Until the 13th century the abbey was subject to interference from the diocese of Metz, which had acquired influence in the region because Trudo had given them Zerkingen (and probably also Webbekom and Zelem in return for his studies with bishop Chlodulf of Metz.

The abbey had rights of patronage over many parish churches, many of which were dedicated to Saint Clement, who was venerated in the abbey. From private gifts over the centuries the abbey also acquired extensive estates in the area. In 1107 it is mentioned that it even owned a number of villages in North Brabant. There were financial problems nevertheless, resulting from the financial exploitation of the abbey by its voogde, the Dukes of Limburg, and under-voogde, the Counts of Duras.

=== Middle Ages ===
In the Middle Ages pilgrimages to the grave of Saint Trudo were of great economic significance for the abbey and its surroundings, later the town of Sint-Truiden. In the 11th century the quantity of pilgrims became so great that it made necessary the building of a new abbey church to contain them. This took place in the third quarter of the 11th century under Abbot Adelardus II (abbot 1055-1082). The new church was an enormous Romanesque structure 100 metres long and 26 metres wide, of which only the two west towers and parts of the crypt remain. In time of war the towers served as donjons, whereby wooden stellages were built round the towers, from where the enemy could be bombarded. This happened among other occasions in conflicts between the abbey and the neighbouring town of Brustem, during which the abbey was sacked at least once.

Under abbot Wiricus (abbot 1155-1180) the conventual buildings were modernised, a task which according to the Gesta abbatum Trudosensium (the annals of Sint-Truiden) lasted three-quarters of a century. First the dormitory and refectory of the monks were modernised, then the abbot's lodgings and finally those of the provost. In particular, Wiricus' own apartment, situated on the highest point of the terrain with a panoramic view across the town, was comfortably appointed, with fireplaces and a piped water supply system. According to the Gesta the walls of the cloisters were covered with polished hardstone panels and groups of columns, either in pairs or in fours, made of black stone and porphyry, with sculpted capitals. Another building, intended for the accommodation of high-ranking guests, had richly decorated ceilings.

The burial chapel of Saint Wiro and companions, also built during the rule of Abbot Wiricus in 1169–72, must have been exceptional. According to the chronicler, this structure surpassed all others far and wide. Of the Romanesque conventual buildings and this monument nothing remains, except possibly for some capitals found on the site, probably from the workshop of some stone carver in Liege.

=== Later years ===
Further building and extensions took place in the 15th and early 16th centuries, during which inter alia Late Gothic points were added to the middle towers of the abbey church. These were replaced in 1779 by a single Baroque crown, which was dislodged by a storm in 1953, restored and then destroyed by the fire in 1975.

Under abbot Willem van Brussel in about 1520 the perimeter wall, parts of which survive, surrounding the abbey complex was built, and the abbot's lodgings were refurbished (of which the cellars and the present Emperor's Hall remain). The Baroque gateway was completed in 1665 on the occasion of the thousand-year anniversary of the abbey's foundation. Some of the service buildings were also renewed at this time. Finally, at the end of the 18th century, abbot Joseph van Herck had the abbey buildings refurbished in Neo-classical style.

=== Abbots of Sint-Truiden ===
It is not clear whether Saint Trudo himself (c. 630-693), the abbey's founder, was also its abbot. For a long period the abbey was much under the influence of the bishops of Metz, who also appointed the abbots of Sint-Truiden. Bishops Drogo of Metz (c. 820) and Adalbero I of Metz (ca 944-962) both lived for long periods in Sint-Truiden, but apparently not as abbots.

Significant mediaeval abbots included Adelardus II (1055–82), who built among other things the Romanesque abbey church and the Onze-Lieve-Vrouwekerk (Church of Our Lady) in Sint-Truiden, and Wiricus (1155–80), who built the Romanesque monastic buildings and the tomb of Saint Trudo. Hubertus van Sutendael (1638–63) built inter alia the still extant Baroque church portal and Nieuwenhoven Castle. Abbot Joseph van Herck (1751–80) commissioned the Neo-classical gatehouse of the abbot's lodging, the Emperor's Hall and the late Baroque tower crown.

=== End of the abbey and later use ===
The arrival of the French Revolutionary forces in 1794 meant the end of the abbey, which was suppressed, plundered and reused as a military hospital. The Romanesque church, which was severely damaged by fire in 1794, was demolished in 1798. The building materials, including stones, tiles, slates, beams and porphyry columns, were sold. Only the church towers, the crypt, the gatehouse, the abbot's lodgings and a few service buildings remained. Through various individual proprietors the former abbey grounds became the property in 1824 of the Onze-Lieve-Vrouwekerk (Church of Our Lady) in Sint-Truiden, which sold the whole complex in 1839 to the diocese of Liège.

In 1843 the diocese built a seminary on the site, to replace the former diocesan seminary in Rolduc, which as a result of the separation of Belgium and the Netherlands in 1838 had come to be in a different country. Part was housed in existing buildings, and part was newly built on the foundations of demolished abbey buildings to plans by Louis Roelandt. In 1845 a new Neo-classical seminary church was built on the site of Saint Trudo's original, the fourth in this place.

=== Recent history ===
In 1975 a catastrophic fire severely damaged the Baroque abbey buildings and destroyed the 1845 seminary church. In 1992 an explosion destroyed the abbey mill.

In 1999 the outline of the Romanesque abbey church on the site (the Kerkveld) was made visible by means of gabions. In addition, eight steel pillars mark the position and the height (18 metres) of the former pillars in the south aisle. The towers and the crypt were made accessible at the same time by an electronic access system, whereby a code is issued on receipt of payment which opens a fence. The Kerkveld itself is accessible for nothing. At the foot of the towers is a bronze model of the abbey church at the height of its glory.

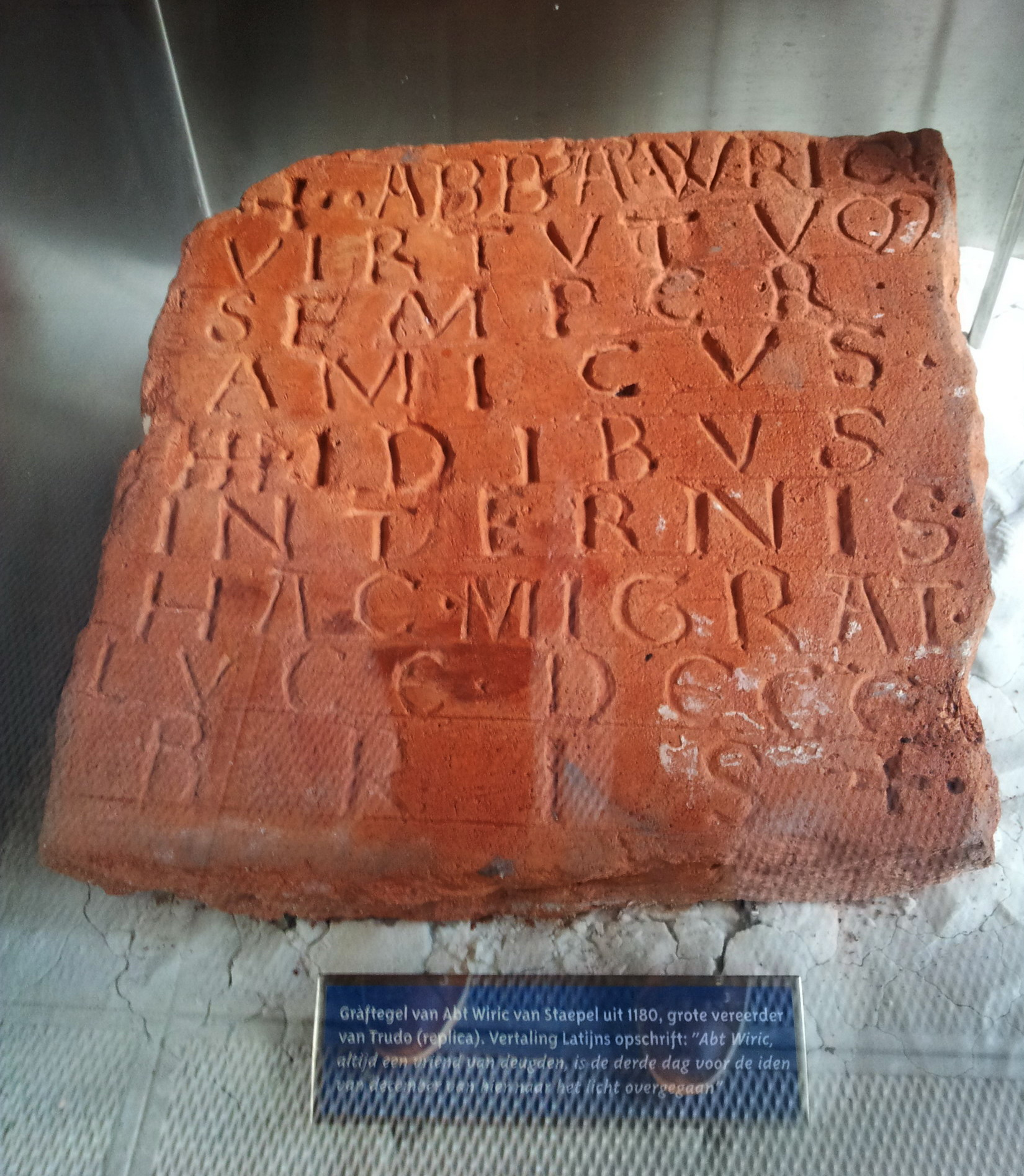
Memorial stone of Abbot Wiricus

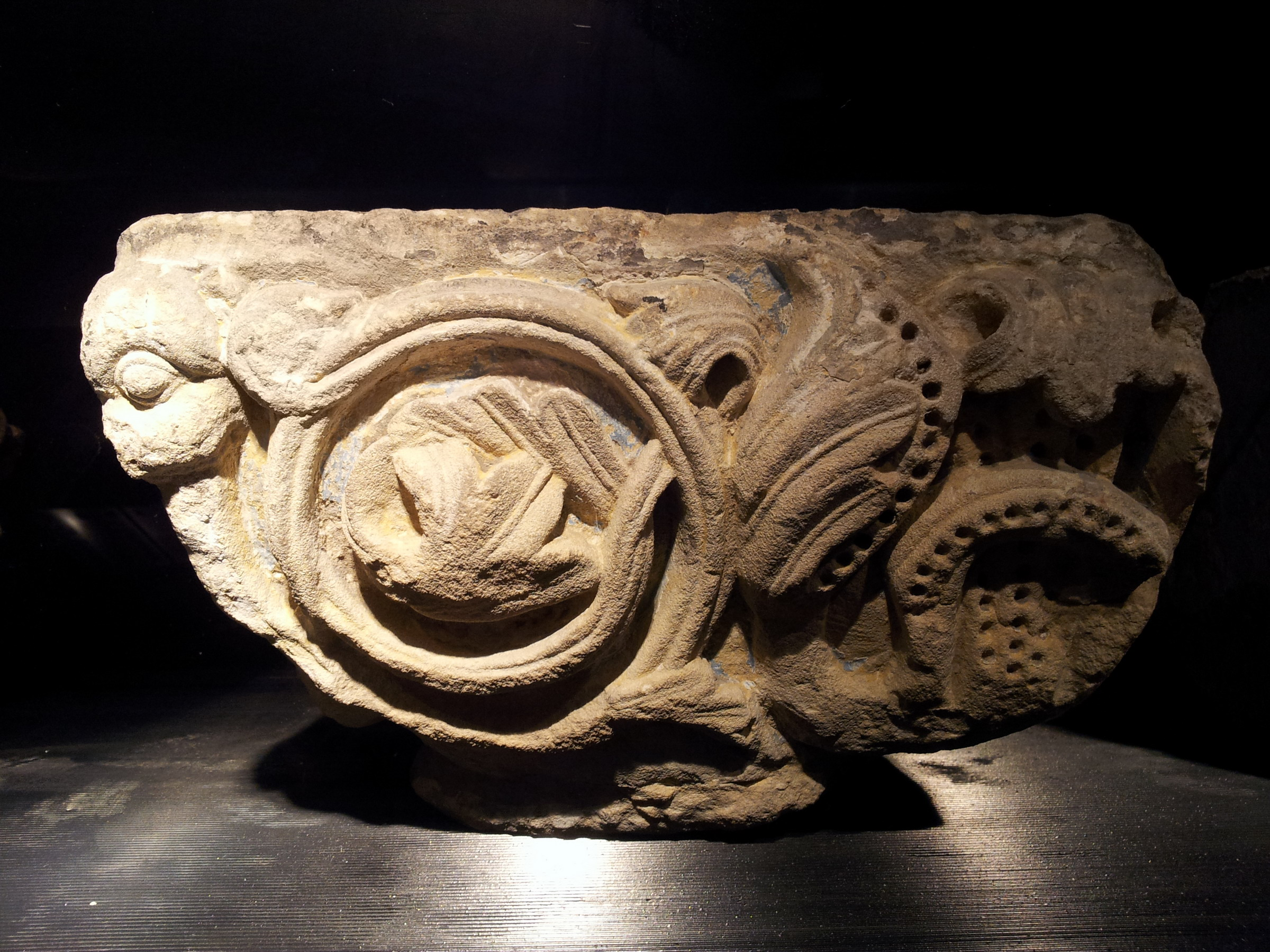
Romanesque capital

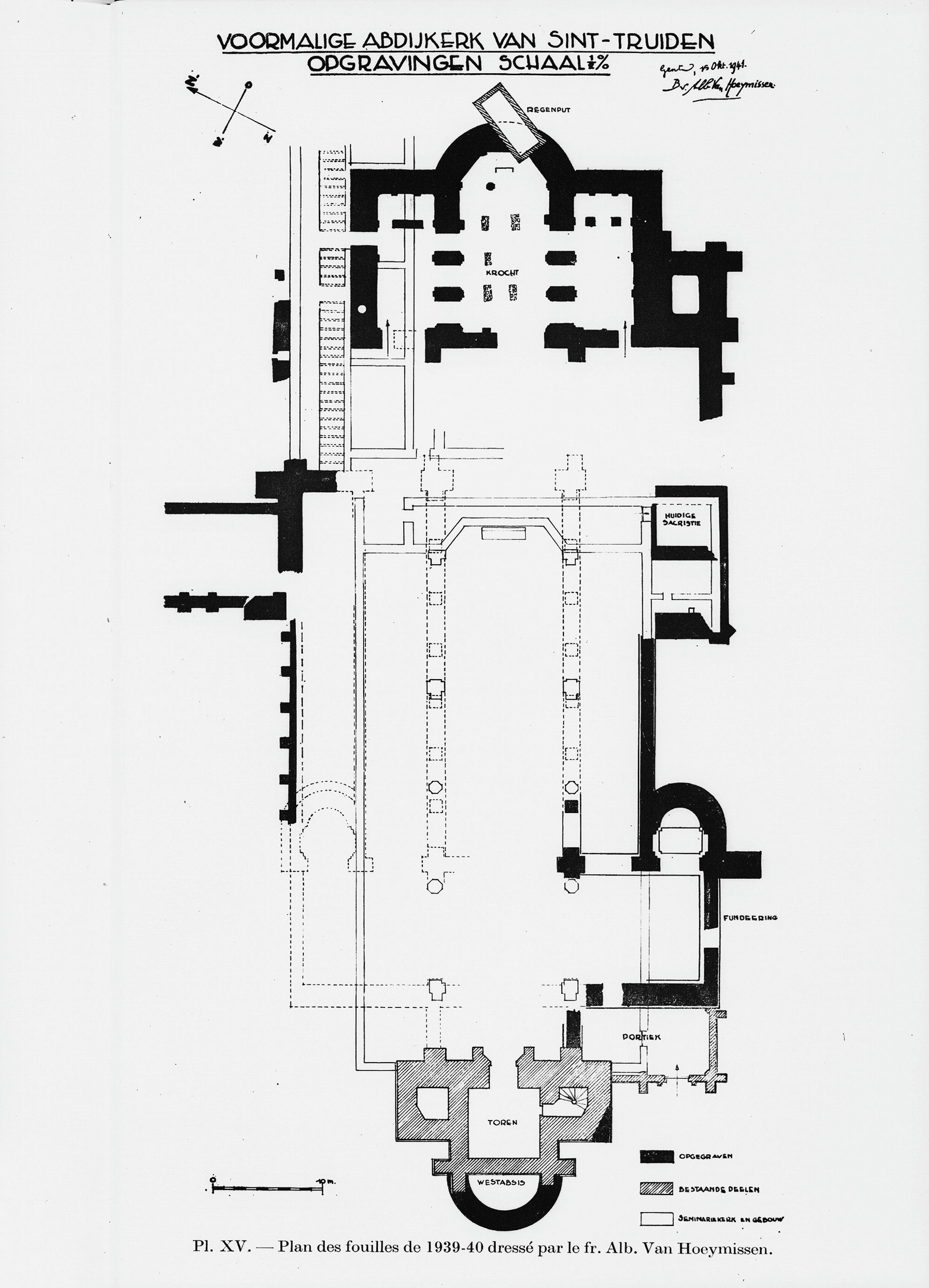
Engraved plan of the abbey church based on excavations 1939-40

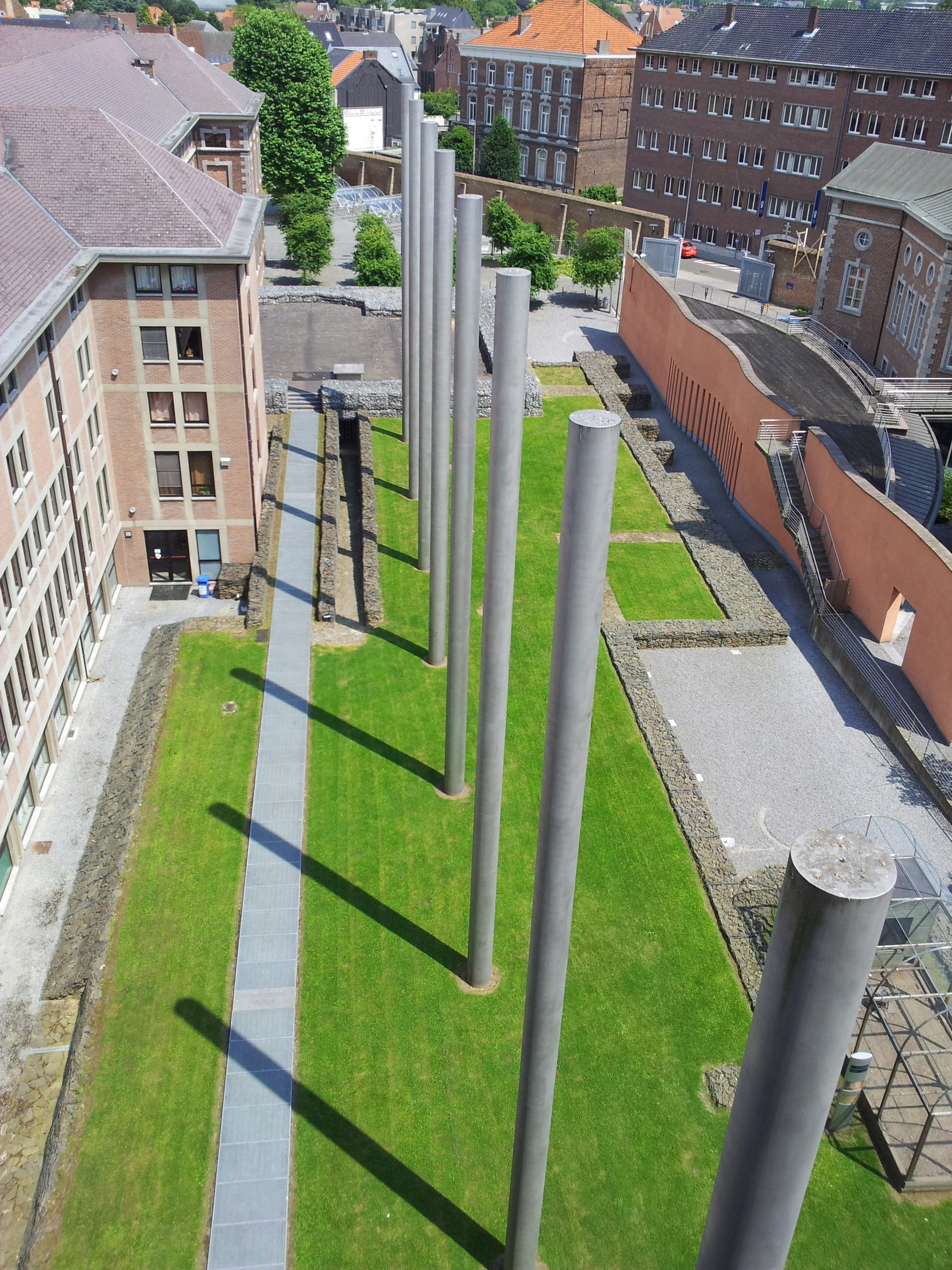
Kerkveld

== Bibliography ==
- Diriken, P., 2013: Religieus erfgoed in Haspengouw. Kortessem, 2013
- Hartog, E. den, 1992: Romanesque Architecture and Sculpture in the Meuse Valley. Leeuwarden/Mechelen, 1992
- Hartog, E. den, 2002: Romanesque sculpture in Maastricht. Maastricht, 2002
- Lavigne, E., 1986-93: Kroniek van de abdij van Sint-Truiden, deel I (Assen/Maastricht, 1986), deel II (Leeuwarden/Maastricht, 1988) en deel III (Leeuwarden/Mechelen, 1993)
- Timmers, J.J.M., 1971: De Kunst van het Maasland. Assen
