= Arnold V of Loon =

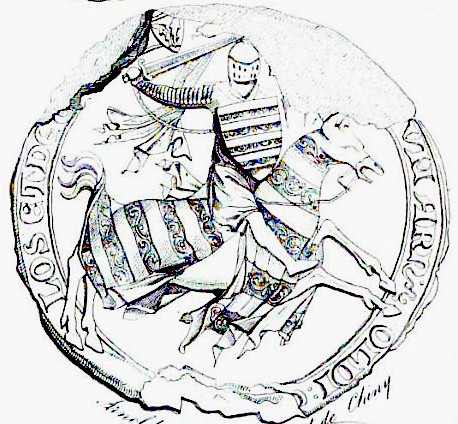

Arnold V de Looz (died August 22, 1327) was Count of Loon from 1279 to 1323 and Count of Chiny (Arnulf III) from 1299 to 1310. He was the son of John I, Count of Looz and Mathilde Jülich.

== Biography ==
Barely Count of Looz, he helped Richardis of Guelders, widow of his maternal grandfather, Henri, Count of Luxembourg and Reginald I of Guelders, to fight Siegfried von Westerburg, archbishop of Cologne. Taken prisoner, the latter had to pay a large ransom to regain his freedom

He then had to deal with the relatives of Isabelle de Condé, his father's widow, and in 1281 had to assign her a dower, and cede Warcq, Agimont and Givet to his half-brothers Jean and Jacquemin. For their part, the latter abandoned their rights to the county of Looz. It is on this sole condition that Marguerite's parents on the one hand, and her uncle Nicolas II de Condé on the other hand, consent to his marriage with Marguerite of Vianden.

In 1288, he commanded a corps of the army of John I, Duke of Brabant, and contributed much to the victory on June 5 in the famous Battle of Worringen (on the Rhine), which ended the War of Limburg succession between Renaud, Count of Gelderland, husband of Ermingarde heiress, Duchess of Limburg (+ 1283), and the Duke of Brabant.

He took part in the War of the Awans and the Waroux between the families of Awans and Waroux, from 1297 to 1335, on the side of the bishops of Liège, Hugues de Chalon (from 1396 to 1301) and Adolph II of La Marck (from 1313 to 1344), Hesbaye being dependent on these princes. He was named Mambourg or Regent of Liège after the death of Adolf II of Waldeck in 1302.

In 1299, when his uncle Louis V, Count of Chiny died without a son, he inherited Chiny (it was this uncle who had organized the famous Tournament of Chauvency in 1285, described by Jacques Bretel).

In 1312 on the death of Bishop Theobald of Bar, he tried to once again be Mambour of Liège, but had to face the revolt of the bourgeoisie. The principality was ravaged and the count excommunicated.

He contributed to the famous Peace of Fexhe, concluded on June 18, 1316, which established the sharing of power between the prince, the clergy, the nobility and the cities of the principality of Liège and its capital, Liège. It was the formal and legal recognition of the sharing of government between the prince and the country.

Both in Liège and in Brabant he supported the nobility and opposed the revolts of the communes.

Towards the end of his reign, he gradually withdrew from his counties. In 1313, he ceded the county of Chiny to his son Louis IV, then in 1323 the county of Loon. He died August 22, 1328, and is buried at the Abbey of Averbode.

== Marriage and family ==
He married June 21, 1280 Marguerite Vianden († 1316), Lady of Perwez and Grimbergen, daughter of Philip I, Count of Vianden and Marie de Louvain, and had:

- Louis IV († 1336), Count of Loon and Chiny,
- Jean, who died young,
- Arnold,
- Mathilde (1282 † 1313), married to Godefroy II, Lord of Heinsberg, Blankenberge and Wassemberg (1331), for which she received as dowry Castle Vogelsanck (in the current town of Heusden-Zolder, Belgium Limburg) with the villages of Zonhoven, Zolder and Houthalen. Mother of Diederik of Heinsberg, future Count of Loon and Chiny.
- Mary, married first husband Gilles Berthout, Advocatus of Mechelen, died childless in 1310; she married her second husband Eberhard I, Count of the Mark
- Jeanne, lady Quaetbeke, married Arnulf of Wesemael, lord of Bergen op Zoom of Woude and Quaetbeke, killed at the Battle of the Golden Spurs (1302). She remarried William of Oreye, mother of Arnold VI of Rummen, who became lord of Rummen (Rumigny) by donation of his uncle Louis IV of Loon in 1331.
- Margaret, wife of William de Duras-Neufchâteau, Esquire; his father gave him as dowry the castle and lordship of Duras;
