= Wars of the Loon Succession =

1336–1366 war in the Holy Roman Empire

- Part of the Liégeois–Brabantian Wars
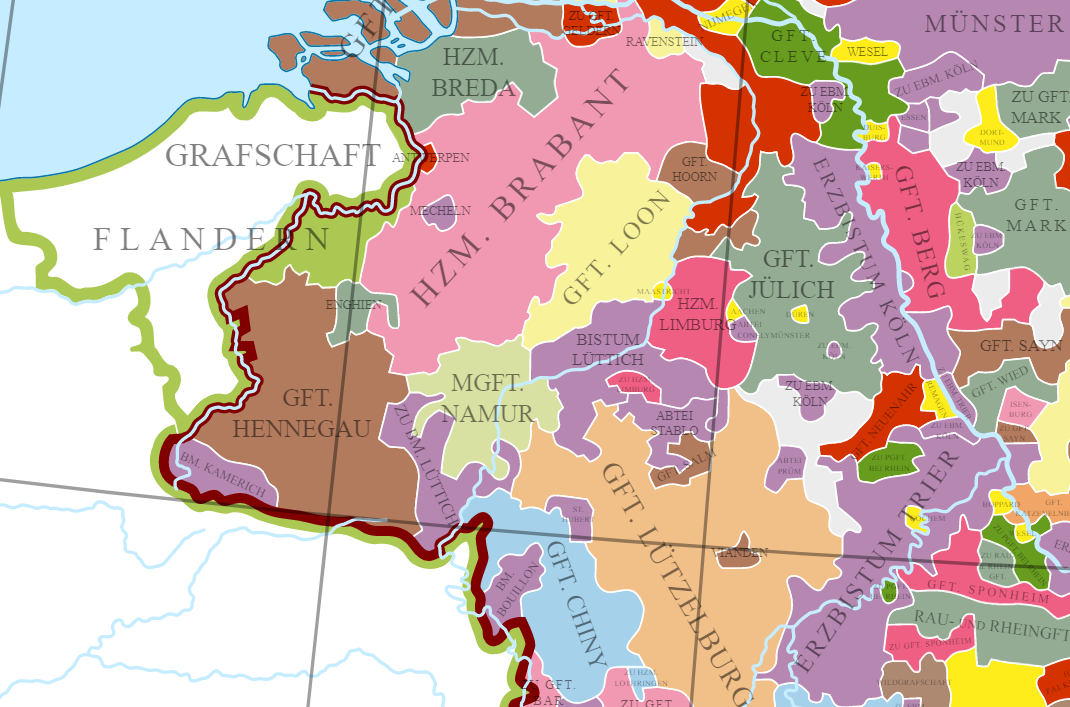
- Loon; Liège (Lüttich); Brabant; Chiny; Luxemburg (Lützelburg); Southern Netherlands c. 1250. Loon and Chiny disappeared from the map because of the war.
| Date | 1336 – 1366 |
| Location | County of Loon |
| Result | Liégeois victory |
| Territorial changes | Annexation of Loon by Liège; Annexation of Chiny by Luxemburg |

Belligerents
| County of Loon; Supported by: Duchy of Brabant (1337–1363); Duchy of Luxemburg (1361–1366) | Prince-Bishopric of Liège; Supported by: Avignon Papacy |

Commanders and leaders
| Diederik of Heinsberg; John III of Brabant Arnold of Rummen; Wenceslaus I Joanna of Brabant (1361–1363) Godfrey of Dalenbroek (1361–1362) | Adolph II of the Mark; Engelbert III; John of Arkel; Pope Benedict XII |

The Wars of the Loon Succession (Dutch: Loonse Successieoorlogen, French: Guerres de succession de Looz) is the name of the war of succession that arose after the childless death of Louis IV, Count of Loon on 22 January 1336. In the first period, the County of Loon led by claimant Diederik of Heinsberg managed to maintain its autonomy in relation to the Prince-Bishopric of Liège. During the second period, however, Arnold of Rummen, the last indigenous claimant to the title of count of Loon, first had to sell the County of Chiny to the Duchy of Luxemburg to cover his military expenses, and soon after conceded defeat. The wars came to an end with the annexation of Loon by Liège in 1366.

Since there was a time of peace between 1346 and 1361, it is common to refer to the Wars of the Loon Succession in plural, as it is to call it the War of the Loon Succession in singular with two 'periods', 'acts' or 'phases'.

== First period (1336–1346) ==
=== Escalation ===
Diederik of Heinsberg, the son of Louis' sister, claimed the title of Count of Loon, and had himself proclaimed the heir with the assistance of John III, Duke of Brabant. Even before his death, Louis had in fact designated Diederik as his successor. However, the chapter of Saint Lambert's Cathedral in Liège, of which Loon was a fief, refused to appoint him. The chapter invoked a decision made at the Diet of Frankfurt of 13 August 1246, which stipulated that all ecclesiastical fiefs should return into the Catholic Church's possession if the vassal died without children. Moreover, the chapter argued, because Loon was a so-called swordfief, meaning women cannot inherit the fief according to the old German customary law, Diederik could not gain his uncle's inheritance via his mother. The chapter allotted 40,000 guilders for the conquest of Loon, and requested and received the support of the Pope in Avignon, Benedict XII. The Liégeois cities supported the chapter's demand, but the Liégeois nobility preferred a different hereditary custom, in which sisters and sons are allowed to inherit fiefdoms. The prince-bishop of Liège himself, Adolph of the Mark, was a brother-in-law of Diederik, and initially did not want a conflict with his own family, and distanced himself from the demands of his chapter.

=== Diederik versus Adolph ===
While the Pope was putting the prince-bishop under pressure to claim Loon by military force in the name of the Church, Diederik was appointed as the count of Loon by Emperor Louis the Bavarian on 12 April 1336. Although Adolph occupied Kolmont (near Tongeren), this was more of a symbolic act than a strategic move, and on 13 August 1337 he received a new papal reminder to annex Loon in its entirety. As soon as Diederik heard the demand to surrender his county to the Church of Liège, he deliberately turned towards Liège's arch enemy, the Duchy of Brabant, on 19 December 1337. He concluded a military alliance with duke John III, agreeing to support each other if either of them was attacked, especially by Liège.

Thus, Diederik became the de facto count, while he placed himself under the aegis of the duke of Brabant and the emperor; in Chiny he was the undisputed ruler.

Godfrey of Loon-Heinsberg, Diederik's only son, died in battle in 1342, rendering his succession uncertain.

== Second period (1361–1366) ==
=== Arnold and Godfrey versus Engelbert ===
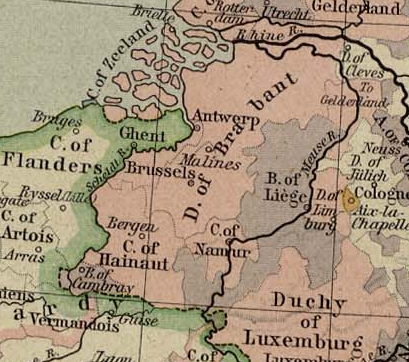
Post-war situation (1477)

When Diederik died in January 1361, his succession was challenged by Arnold of Rummen and Godfrey of Dalenbroek (both cousins of Diederik) on the one hand, and prince-bishop Engelbert III on the other, who once again tried to annex Loon. The prince-bishop proclaimed the attachment of Loon to Liège, and had his troops occupy the county. Godfrey gave up the fight in 1362, and sold his rights to Loon and Chiny to Arnold. The latter managed to rally the assistance of duke Wenceslaus of Brabant and Luxembourg (whom he was already serving as an advisor) and his half-brother, emperor Charles IV; moreover, his wife Elisabeth was rich. The Liégeois army could not maintain its position and was forced to withdraw.

=== Arnold versus John of Arkel ===
However, Arnold's odds were turning: duchess Joanna of Brabant abandoned him in 1363 by retracting her support for Loon. The next year, Engelbert III became archbishop of Cologne; John of Arkel, the bishop of Utrecht, replaced him as prince-bishop of Liège. That same year, John of Arkel invaded Loon anew; the ongoing war forced Arnold to sell Chiny to Wenceslaus, who merged it into the Duchy of Luxemburg. In 1365, Arnold and Elisabeth's family fortress "De Warande" at Rummen (near Geetbets) was besieged for nine weeks from 9 August until 21 September by the prince-bishop, who conquered it and razed it to the ground. Incidentally, the defenders reportedly used gunpowder and small blunderbusses for the first time in this region. The next year, 1366, the County of Loon definitively lost its autonomy and was annexed by the Prince-Bishopric of Liège.
