= Otto II of Chiny =

Luxembourgish aristocrat

Otto II (1065 – after 1131), Count of Chiny, son of Arnold I, Count of Chiny, and Adélaïs.

He succeeded his father in 1106 and completed the construction of the Abbey of Orval that his father had started in 1070, installing the canons in 1124. The installation of a Cistercian community in Orval in 1131 marked his last appearance in any proceedings.

He married Adelaide (Alix) (1068–1124), daughter of Albert III, Count of Namur and Ida of Saxony (widow of Frederick of Lower Lorraine). Their children were:

- Ida (died before 1125), married to Godfrey I, Count of Leuven
- Oda (died after 1134), married to Giselbert II, Count of Duras
- Hugues, probably died young
- Albert of Chiny (before 1131–1162)
- Frederick, (died after 1124), Provost at Reims from 1120
- Adalbero II of Chiny-Namur (died 26 March 1145), Bishop of Liège, 1135–1145
- Eustache (died after 1156), married to a daughter of Wiger de Waremme, Avoué of Liège Saint-Lambert and Hesbaye. His son Louis de Lumaine was also Avoué of Hesbaye.

Ida (also known as Ida of Namur) and Godfrey I (also known as Godfrey the Bearded, not to be confused with the uncle of his father Henry II, Godfrey) were parents of Adeliza of Louvain, wife of Henry I of England. Oda’s husband Gislebert was son of Otto, Count of Duras and therefore the grandson of Giselbert, the first Count of Looz, whose family would eventually be merged with the Counts of Chiny with the marriage of Otto's great-great granddaughter Jeanne, Countess of Chiny, with Arnold IV of Looz.

After his death, Otto was succeeded as Count of Chiny by his son Albert.
