= Rudolf II of Ivois =

10th century count of Yvois and Verdun

Rudolfe II (Rudolf, Raoul) (died 963), Count of Ivois and Count of Verdun (as Raoul), was son of Rudolfe I, Count of Ivois, and Eva.

Rudolfe succeeded his father as Count of Ivois and was installed as Count of Verdun after the death of Otto, Duke of Lorraine, in 944. After his death in 963, Godfrey the Prisoner was installed as count.

An estimate that his rule as Count of Verdun ended in 960 is based on a reference to Godfrey as a count in 960. However, Godfrey was also count of Bidgau and Methingau from 959, so there is no reason to believe that Rudolfe was not count until his death in 963.

Rudolfe was overthrown as Count of Ivois by Étienne, Count of Porcien (year unknown), and replaced as Count of Verdun in 963 by Godfrey.
