= Godfrey of Heinsberg, Count of Loon =

Godfrey de Heinsberg (died 1395), Lord of Daelenbroeck, Count of Looz and Count of Chiny (1361–1362), son of John of Heinsberg, Lord of Daelenbroeck (brother of the preceding count Thierry de Heinsberg).

== Biography ==
Upon the death of his uncle Thierry in 1361, Godfrey claimed his estates and proclaimed himself Count of Looz and Chiny. However, Engelbert III of the Marck, Prince-Bishop of Liege, was far less merciful to Godfrey than to Thierry, and pursued the claims to the counties that Adolph of the Marck had negotiated with Louis IV the Younger in an agreement in 1190. This is interesting (but not surprising) in that Engelbert was the brother-in-law of Godfrey, having married Richardis of Jülich (died 1360), sister of Godfrey’s wife Philippa.

Engelbert proclaimed the annexation of Looz and Chiny for the Chapter of St. Lambert in Liege on May 5, 1361, and his troops occupied the county from June 1361. On January 25, 1362, Godfrey sold the counties and their rights to Arnold of Rumigny, grandson of Arnold V, Count of Looz and Chiny.
Arnold was destined to be the last of the Counts of Looz and Chiny, as his county was finally incorporated into the Liège territory in 1366.

=== Marriage and children ===
Godfrey was married in 1357 to Philippa of Jülich (d. 1390), daughter of William V, Duke of Jülich, and Joanna of Hainaut. The children of Godfrey and Philippa included:

- John II of Loon-Heinsberg (died 1438), Seigneur of Heinsberg and Daelenbroeck, married first to Margareta van Gennep and second to Anna von Solms
- Godfrey, canon of Utrecht or Maastricht
- Jeanne (died 1415), married in 1375 to Willem VI of Horne (died 25 October 1415 at the Battle of Agincourt), son of William V of Horn and Isabelle van Arkel
- Philippa, married first to Gérard de Tomberg-Landskron and second to Gumprecht, Count of Neuenahr
- Catherine, married in 1389 to Gisbert de Buron.

== Sources ==
- Arlette Laret-Kayser, Entre Bar et Luxembourg : Le Comté de Chiny des Origines à 1300, Bruxelles (éditions du Crédit Communal, Collection Histoire, série in-8°, n° 72), 1986
- Marchandisse, Alain, La fonction épiscopale à Liège aux xiiie et xive siècles: étude de politologie historique, Bibliothèque de la Faculté de Philosophie et de Lettres de l'Université de Liège, 1998
- Barker, Juliet, Agincourt: The King, the Campaign, the Battle. London: Little, Brown, 2005
