= Louis IX (disambiguation) =

Louis IX (1214–1270; r. 1226–1270) was King of France.

Louis IX may also refer to:

- Louis IX, Duke of Bavaria (1417–1479; r. 1450–1479), sovereign of Bavaria-Landshut
- Louis IX, Landgrave of Hesse-Darmstadt (1719–1790; r. 1768–1790)

== See also ==
- King Louis (disambiguation)
