= Engelbert of the Mark =

Engelbert of the Mark or Englebert of La Marck may refer to:

- Engelbert I of the Mark
- Engelbert II of the Mark
- Engelbert III of the Mark
- Engelbert III of the Mark (archbishop)
