= Louis X =

Louis X may refer to:

- Louis X of France (1289–1316), King of Navarre (r. 1305–1316) and King of France (r. 1314–1316)
- Louis X, Duke of Bavaria (1495–1545; r. 1516–1545)
- Louis I, Grand Duke of Hesse (1753–1830; r. 1806–1830), also Landgrave of Hesse-Darmstadt as Louis X
- Louis Farrakhan (born 1933), head of the Nation of Islam and formerly called Louis X

== See also ==
- King Louis (disambiguation)
