= Louis VII (disambiguation) =

Louis VII (1120–1180; r. 1137–1180) was King of the Franks.

Louis VII may also refer to:

- Louis VII, Duke of Bavaria (c. 1368 – 1447), ruler of Bavaria-Ingolstadt
- Louis VII, Landgrave of Hesse-Darmstadt (1658–1678; r. 1678)

== See also ==
- King Louis (disambiguation)
