= Louis IV of Looz =

Louis IV (died January 19, 1336), Count of Looz (1323–1336) and Count of Chiny (as Louis VI) (1313–1336), son of Arnold V, Count of Looz and Chiny, and Marguerite Vianden.

== Biography ==
His father relinquished the County of Chiny to Louis in 1313 and abdicated in Borgloon in 1323. He supported Adolph of La March, Prince-Bishop of Liège, in several conflicts, including that of February 4, 1325, when rioters attacked the castle at Momalle. Later, Louis mediated the peace in this conflict.

In 1313, he married Margaret of Lorraine, widow of Guy de Dampierre, Count of Zeeland, and daughter of Theobald II, Duke of Lorraine and Isabella of Rumigny. They had no children.

In 1331, he give his nephew Arnold d'Oreye and his mother Jeanne (daughter of Arnold V and his sister) full possession of the manor of Rumigny. Upon his death, his other nephew Thierry de Heinsberg became his successor in both Looz and Chiny. This led to the Wars of the Loon Succession, which ended with the annexation of the County of Loon by the Prince-Bishopric of Liège.
