= Louis IV =

Louis IV or Ludwig IV may refer to:

- Louis the Child, also known as Louis IV (893–911)
- Louis IV of France (920–954)
- Louis IV, Count of Chiny (c. 1173 to 1177–1226)
- Louis IV, Landgrave of Thuringia (1200–1227)
- Louis IV, Count of Looz (died 1336)
- Louis IV, Holy Roman Emperor (1282–1347)
- Louis IV, Elector Palatine (1424–1449)
- Louis IV de Bueil, Comte de Sancerre (died c. 1565)
- Louis IV, Landgrave of Hesse-Marburg (1537–1604)
- Louis IV, Prince of Condé or Louis Henri, Duke of Bourbon (1692–1740)
- Louis IV, Grand Duke of Hesse (1837–1892)
