= Chauvency-le-Château =

- Commune
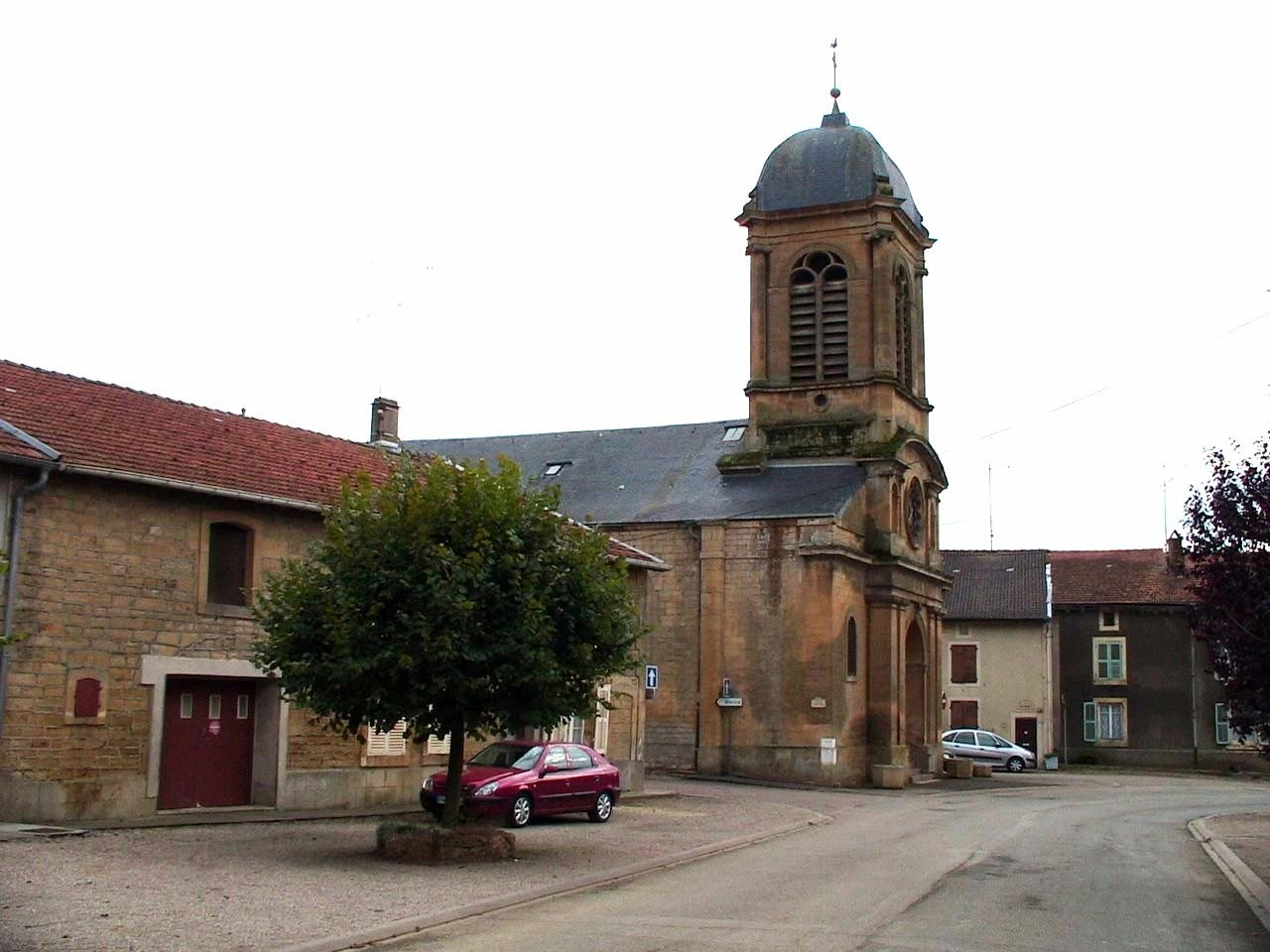
- The church in Chauvency-le-Château

- Coat of arms
- Location of Chauvency-le-Château
- Location within France Location within Grand Est
- Coordinates: 49°31′11″N 5°18′38″E
- Country: France
- Region: Grand Est
- Department: Meuse
- Arrondissement: Verdun
- Canton: Montmédy
- Intercommunality: CC du pays de Montmédy

Government
  - Mayor (2024–2026): Anita Bianco
- Area^{1}: 8.82 km^{2} (3.41 sq mi)
- Elevation: 181 m (594 ft)
- Highest elevation: 327 m (1,073 ft)
- Lowest elevation: 172 m (564 ft)
- Population (2023): 224
  - Density: 25.4/km^{2} (65.8/sq mi)
- Time zone: UTC+01:00 (CET)
  - Summer (DST): UTC+02:00 (CEST)
- INSEE/Postal code: 55109 /55600
- ^{1} French Land Register data, which excludes lakes, ponds, glaciers > 1 km^{2} (0.386 sq mi or 247 acres) and river estuaries.

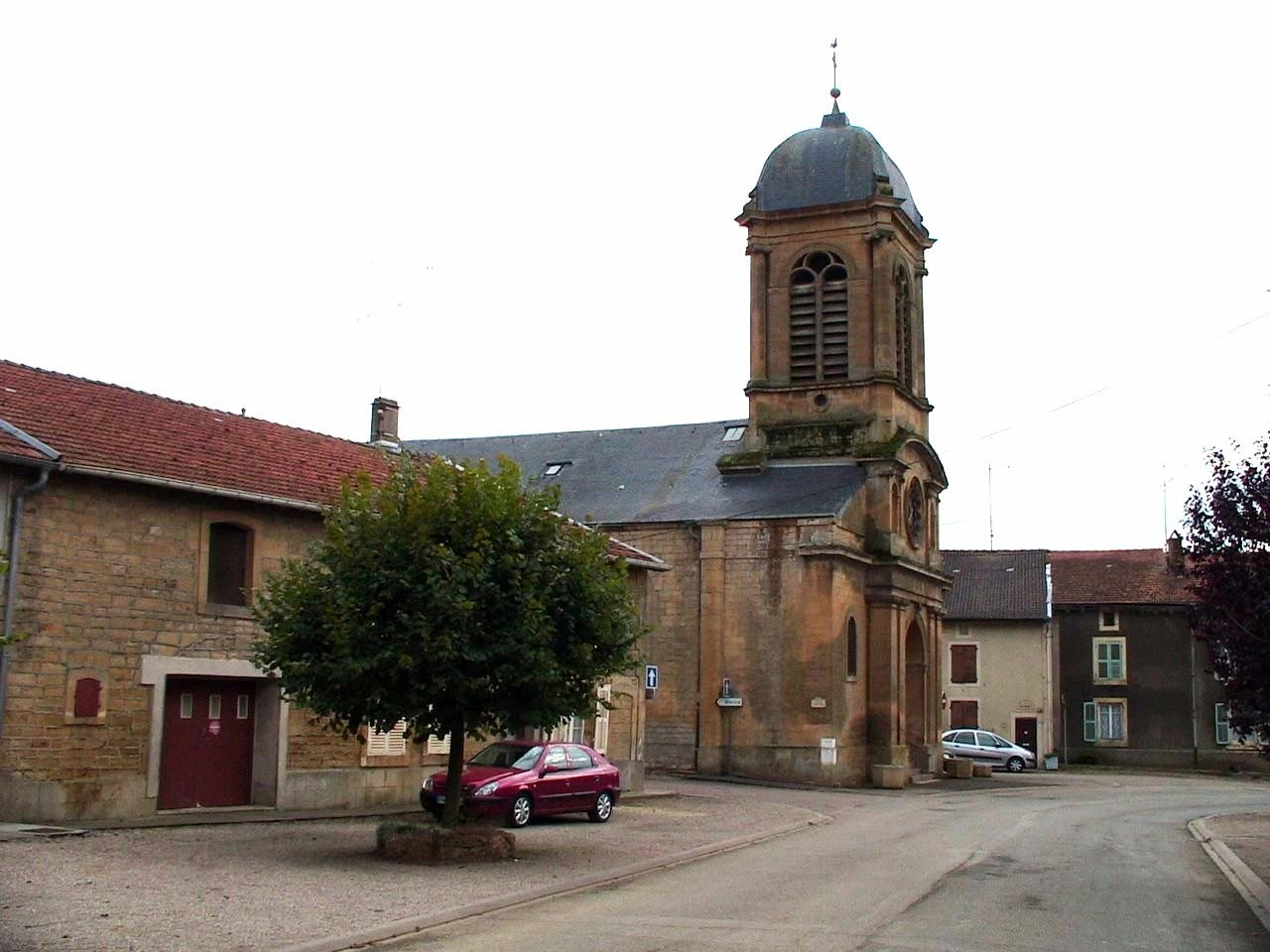
Chauvency-le-Château

Chauvency-le-Château (French pronunciation: [ʃovɑ̃si l(ə) ʃɑto]) is a commune in the Meuse department in Grand Est in north-eastern France.

The Chauvency tournament took place in 1285. The story of the tournament has been told by trouvère Jacques Bretel, and is kept in a manuscript (reference: MS. Douce 308) at the Bodleian Library.

== See also ==
- Communes of the Meuse department
