= Louis VIII (disambiguation) =

Louis VIII (1187–1226; r. 1223–1226) was King of France.

Louis VIII may also refer to:

- Louis VIII, Duke of Bavaria (1403–1445; r. 1443–1445)
- Louis VIII, Landgrave of Hesse-Darmstadt (1691–1768; r. 1739–1768)

== See also ==
- King Louis (disambiguation)
