= Louis III =

Louis III may refer to:

- Louis the Younger, sometimes III of Germany (835–882)
- Louis III of France (865–882)
- Louis the Blind, Louis III, Holy Roman Emperor, (c. 880–928)
- Louis the Child, sometimes III of Germany (893–911)
- Louis III, Count of Chiny (died 1189)
- Ludwig III of Thuringia (ruled 1172–1190), see Hermann I, Landgrave of Thuringia
- Louis III of Châtillon (died 1391)
- Louis III of Naples (1403–1434)
- Louis III, Elector Palatine (ruled 1410–1436)
- Louis III, Landgrave of Hesse, nicknamed "the Frank" (1438–1471)
- Louis III, Count of Löwenstein (1530–1611)
- Louis III, Duke of Württemberg (1554–1593)
- Louis III, Cardinal of Guise (1575–1621)
- Louis III, Prince of Condé (1668–1710)
- Ludwig III, Grand Duke of Hesse and by Rhine (1806–1877)
- Ludwig III of Bavaria (1845–1921)
