= Étienne, Count of Ivois =

French count

Étienne (Stephen) (d. after 956), Count of Ivois and Count of Porcien. The County of Porcien dates back to the eighth century and her rulers were loyal to the Carolingian dynasty. The Treaty of Verdun in 843 assigned Porcien to Charles the Bald and Étienne is the first recorded Count of Porcien. There is a possible connection between the Counts of Porcien and Counts of Laon based on onomastics related to Roger, Count of Laon.

Étienne invaded the County of Ivois and displaced Rudolfe II, installing himself as count. A charter dated 21 Nov 955 records an agreement between Eremboldus miles [a military commander] and Robert, the Archbishop of Trier, relating to property including Aduna in comitatu Ivotio inter Boura et Lannilley. This commander is presumably Etienne.

Étienne and his wife Frédévide founded the priory of Thin le Moutier at Porcien. No children are recorded from this marriage. Etienne built the castle of Mirwart in Ivois, and donated property to the Abbey of Chauvency (near Montmédy) after he became paralysed (cause unknown). The Miracula Sancti Huberti record that comes Stephanus donated part of Chauvency to Saint-Hubert in 955. Étienne was displaced by Otto I, the first Count of Chiny, in 956.
