= Jacques Bretel =

Jacques Bretel (in red) greeting the knight Conrad Warnier (on horseback), from the chansonnier Douce 308

Jacques Bretel or Jacques Bretex (dates of birth and death unknown) was a French language trouvère, best known for having written le Tournoi de Chauvency.

His only known work, signed and dated in 1285, le Tournoi de Chauvency is a long poem of about 4,500 verses recounting the events of a tournament held during six days of feasting given by Louis V, Count of Chiny, in October 1285 at Chauvency-le-Château. It is without doubt a masterpiece of French Middle Ages literature and, in any case, one of the best digests of courtly art of the period.

His origin is unknown, but Tournoi de Chauvency is written in Old French combined with words in the western Lorraine dialect.

Le Tournoi de Chauvency is kept in a manuscript (reference: Douce 308) at the Bodleian Library at the University of Oxford.

== Sources ==
- Jacques Bretel, Le Tournoi de Chauvency, 1285 (manuscripts: Mons MS 330-215 and Oxford MS Douce 308)
- Maurice Delbouille, Le Tournoi de Chauvency
- Dominique Henriot-Walzer, Dictionnaire du Tournoi de Chauvency, 1285
