= Louis II =

Louis II may refer to:

== Kings ==
- Louis the German (804–876), king of East Francia
- Louis II of Italy (825–875), Carolingian Emperor
- Louis II of France (846–879), better known as Louis the Stammerer
- Louis II of Hungary and Bohemia (1506–1526)
- Louis II of Holland (1804–1831)
- Ludwig II of Bavaria (1845–1886), "Mad King Ludwig"
- Louis II of Navarre (1601–1643), better known as Louis XIII
- Louis II of Etruria (1799–1883), better known as Charles II, Duke of Parma

== Counts ==
- Louis II, Count of Chiny (died before 1066)
- Louis II, Count of Loon (died 1218)
- Louis I of Flanders, Louis II of Nevers, (1304–1346)
- Louis II of Châtillon (died 1372)
- Louis II of Flanders (1330–1384)
- Louis II, Count of Blois (died 1346)
- Louis II, Count of Wuerttemberg (1439–1457)
- Louis II, Count of Montpensier (1483–1501)
- Louis II, Count of Nassau-Weilburg (1565–1627)
- Louis Günther II, Count of Schwarzburg-Ebeleben (1621–1681)

== Landgraves ==
- Louis II, Landgrave of Thuringia (1128–1172)
- Louis II, Landgrave of Lower Hesse (1438–1471)

== Dukes ==
- Louis II, Duke of Bavaria (1229–1294)
- Louis II, Duke of Bourbon (1337–1410)
- Louis II, Duke of Brieg (1380–1436)
- Louis II, Duke of Orléans (1462–1515)
- Louis II, Duke of Longueville (1510–1537)
- Louis II, Grand Duke of Hesse (1777–1848)
- Louis II, Grand Duke of Baden (1824–1858)

== Princes ==
- Louis II de Bourbon, Prince de Condé (1621–1686), "the Great Condé"
- Louis II, Prince of Monaco (1870–1949)
- Louis Frederick II, Prince of Schwarzburg-Rudolstadt (1767–1807)
- Louis Günther II, Prince of Schwarzburg-Rudolstadt (1708–1790)
- Luís Filipe, Prince Royal of Portugal (1887–1908), a.k.a. Louis II, Duke of Braganza

== Other people ==
- Louis II, Elector of Brandenburg (1328–1365)
- Louis II, Cardinal of Guise (1555–1588)
- Louis II d'Évreux (1336–1400)
- Louis II of Naples (1377–1417), Duke of Anjou and Count of Provence
- Louis II de la Trémoille (1460–1525), French general
- Louis II, Count Palatine of Zweibrücken (1502–1532)

== See also ==
- Ludwig II (disambiguation)
