= Albert of Chiny =

12th Century Count of Chiny

Albert (Albert I) (before 1131 – 29 September 1162), Count of Chiny, son of Otto II, Count of Chiny, and Adélaïs of Namur. He succeeded his father before 1131 and spent most of his time in Chiny, not taking part in the various conflicts which shook the region.

He married Agnes, daughter of Renaud I, Count of Bar and Gisèle Vaudémont, daughter of Gerard, Count of Vaudémont. Their children were:

- Louis III, Count of Chiny
- Thierry (d. after 1207), Lord of Mellier, married Elizabeth
- Arnulf of Chiny-Verdun (killed in 1181), Bishop of Verdun, 1172–1181
- Alix (d. after 1177), married to Manasses of Hierges
- Ida of Chiny, married to Gobert V, Lord of Aspremont (see Fredelon and the House of Esch for a discussion of their descendants)
- A daughter, mother of Roger Walehem
- Hughes, married to a daughter of Renaud de Donchéry
- A daughter, Abbess of Givet.

Arnulf was killed by an arrow to the head in front of the castle of Saint Manehulde during an attack on the bishopric of Verdun.

Alix and Mannases were the parents of Albert II of Hierges, Bishop of Verdun (1186–1208). Ida and Gobert were the grandparents of John I of Aspremont, Bishop of Verdun (1217–1224).

Albert was succeeded as Count of Chiny by his son Louis.
