= Les Bulles =

Section of Chiny, Wallonia, Belgium

Coordinates: 49°42′N 5°25′E

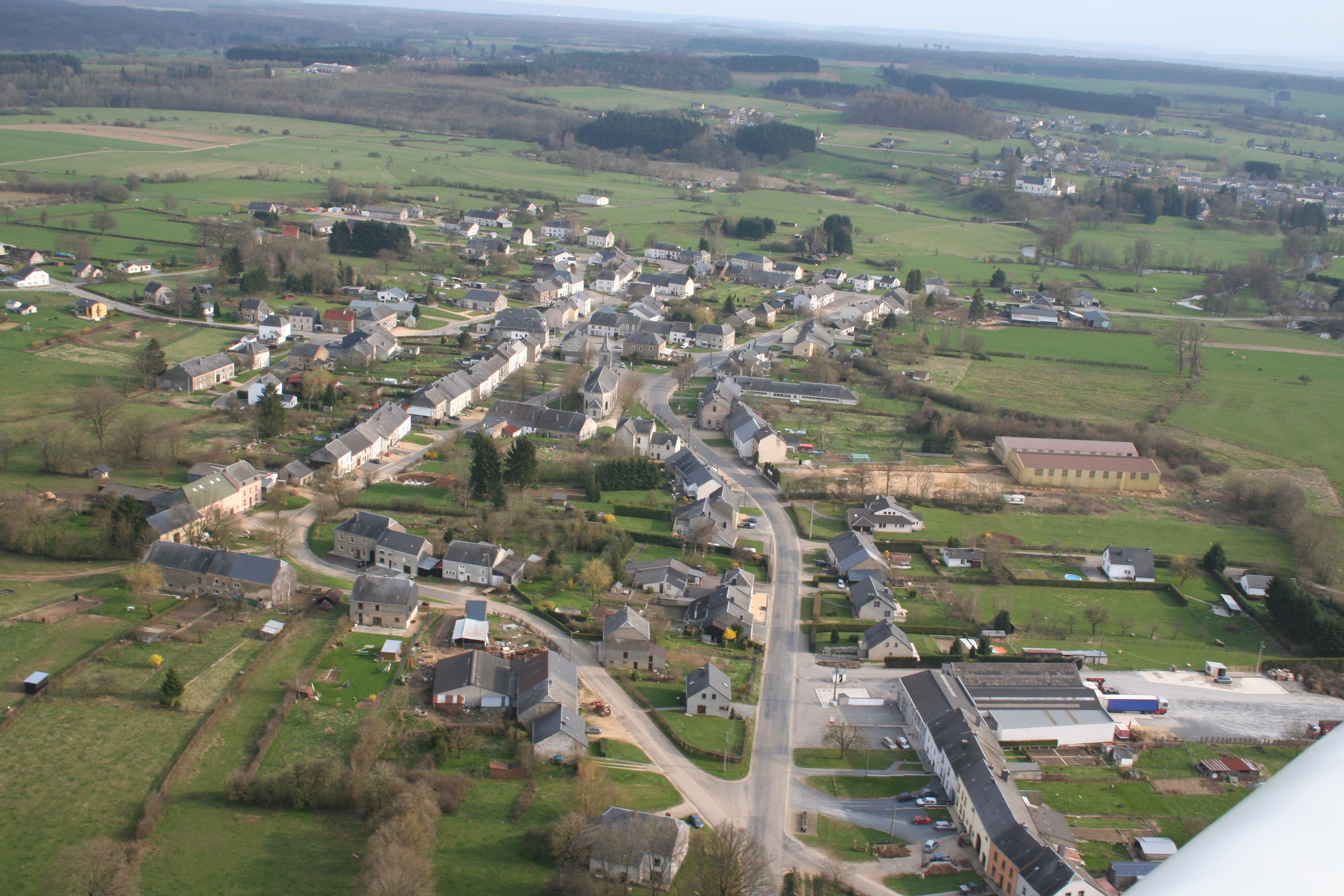
As seen from an aeroplane

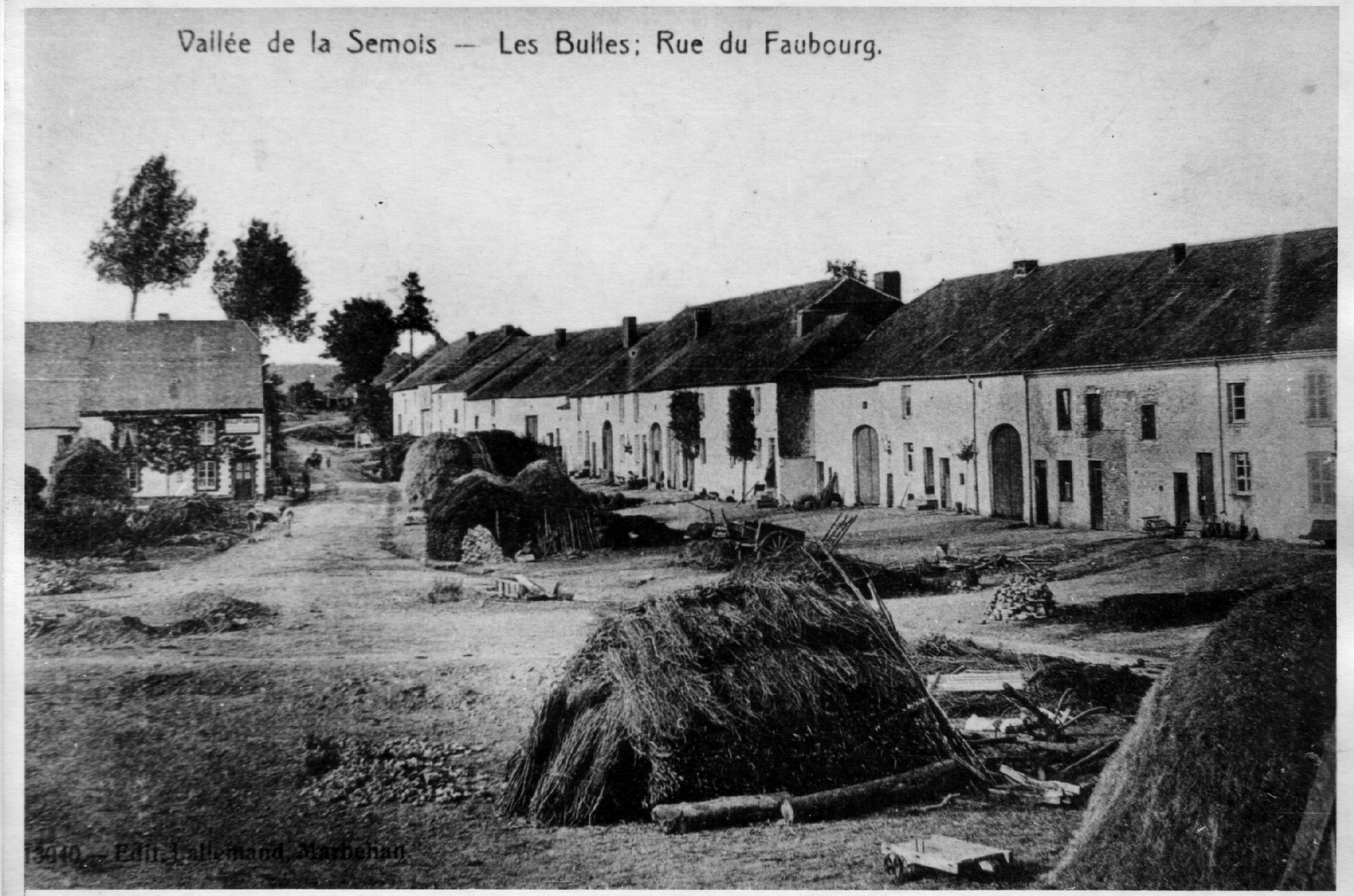
The "rue du Faubourg" in Les Bulles, 1909

Les Bulles (French pronunciation: [le byl]; Gaumais: Les Bûles) is a village of Wallonia and a district of the municipality of Chiny, located in Gaume in the province of Luxembourg, Belgium.

The village is located in the valley of the Semois River at the angle with its affluent the Vierre River. The people who live in the village are called "les Bulots" or "Les Bulaux".

Starting in 1340, Les Bulles was an independent seigniory. In 1673, The seigniory of Les Bulles has been annexed to the 'baronnie' of Jamoigne.

== Origin of the name Les Bulles ==
The strange name Les Bulles might have two possible origins :

- From the French word 'burn' (brûler). The term "brûler" refers to the big fire done during the carnival period.
- From the German word 'bûr' ('burias' meaning residence).

Other origins of the name have been proposed without any real historical background. The final known orthograph of the name Les Bulles is used since 1340 following the writings. The name likely comes from "bule" or "bure", which designates a large square or conical pile of branches, high enough to be burned. The name of Bules is seen in a Latin form, in a charter for the city of Orval in 1174. Later, in 1230 and 1271, Bures is also mentioned. Bures comes from the Latin meaning Burer burn. A bonfire celebration was also lit the annual day of bures, also called "day of the brandons."

An odd feature of the name is that it does not contract after prepositions. One says "aux Etats Unis" or "des Etats Unis" but "à Les Bulles" "club de football de Les Bulles".
