= Ludwig II (disambiguation) =

Ludwig II (1845–1886) was King of Bavaria from 1864 to 1886.

Ludwig II may also refer to:

== People ==
- Louis the German (806–876), called Ludwig II der Deutsche
- Ludwig II, Count of Württemberg (1137–1181)
- Louis II, Duke of Bavaria (1229–1294)
- Ludwig II, Count of Württemberg-Urach (1439–1457)
- Louis II, Count of Nassau-Weilburg (1565-1627)

== Art and entertainment ==
- Ludwig II (sculpture), an 1870 sculpture by Elisabet Ney
- Ludwig II (1922 film), a silent Austrian film directed by Otto Kreisler and starring Olaf Fjord as Ludwig
- Ludwig II, King of Bavaria (1929), a late German silent film directed by and starring William Dieterle
- Ludwig II (1955 film), a 1955 West German film
- Ludwig (film), a 1972 film about Ludwig II written and directed by Luchino Visconti and starring Helmut Berger as Ludwig
- Ludwig II (musical) (2000), a German musical
- Ludwig II (manga), a boys love manga depicting a fictionalized story about the king
- Ludwig II (2012 film)

== See also ==
- Louis II (disambiguation)
