= King Louis =

King Louis may refer to:

== Kings ==
- Louis I (disambiguation), multiple kings with the name
- Louis II (disambiguation), multiple kings with the name
- Louis III (disambiguation), multiple kings with the name
- Louis IV (disambiguation), multiple kings with the name
- Louis V (disambiguation), multiple kings with the name
- Louis VI of France (died 1137), called Louis the Fat
- Louis VII of France (died 1180), called Louis the Younger
- Louis VIII of France (died 1226), called Louis the Lion
- Louis IX of France (died 1270), called Saint Louis
- Louis X of France (died 1316), called Louis the Quarreller
- Louis XI of France (died 1483), called Louis the Prudent
- Louis XII of France (died 1515)
- Louis XIII of France (died 1643), called Louis the Just
- Louis XIV of France, the "Sun King"
- Louis XV of France (died 1774), called the Louis the Beloved
- Louis XVI of France (died 1793) executed in the revolution
- Louis XVII of France (died 1795), died in prison, never anointed as king
- Louis XVIII of France (died 1824),
- Louis Antoine, Duke of Angoulême, sometimes regarded as Louis XIX of France (died 1844), nominally king for less than an hour
- Louis Philippe I of France, the only French monarch to use a two-part regnal name
- Louis Alphonse de Bourbon, Duke of Anjou, claims to be "Louis XX, King of France and Navarre"

== "King Louie" ==
- King Louie, animated film character
- King Louie Bankston, rock musician, better known as King Louie
- King Louie (rapper)

== Other ==
- King Louis, drummer for Jesse Quin & The Mets
