= Counts of Chiny =

The Counts of Chiny were part of the nobility of Lotharingia that ruled from the 9th to the 14th century in what is now part of Belgium.

It has been proposed that the County of Chiny was created in the early 10th century out of the ancient county of Ivois. The county now forms part of the province of Luxembourg in present-day Belgium. The County of Chiny included the present-day towns of Chiny, Virton, Étalle, Florenville, Neufchâteau, Montmédy and Carignan, as well as the castles of Warcq on the Meuse, which was built in 971 by Otto, ancestor of the later Counts of Chiny.

It has also been proposed that there is a close relationship between the Counts of Chiny and the early counts of Looz, the counts of Verdun and the bishops of Verdun.

The family of the counts of Chiny merged with the family of the counts of Looz. The final count of Chiny, Arnold IV de Rumingy, sold the county to the duke of Luxembourg, ending a dynasty of five hundred years.

== Ivois ==
Ivois was a military settlement of the Romans under the name Epoissium, Eposium, Epusum or Ivosium. Gaugericus, Bishop of Cambrai, was born in Eposium around 550. The division of the Lotharingian territories was agreed to on 8 Aug 870 between Louis the German and his half-brother Charles the Bald. This agreement allocated Wavrense comitatus II [two counties in Wavrense] to Charles. Although the name does not appear in the document, it is assumed that one of these was Ivois. Ivois is first referred to by name in a charter dated 21 Nov 955 which records an agreement between Eremboldus miles [knight] and Robert, the Archbishop of Trier, relating to property including Aduna in comitatu Ivotio [the county of Ivois] inter Boura et Lannilley.

Ivois, with its strategic location between the French and German kingdoms, was an ideal neutral location for meetings between the Frankish kings and the Holy Roman Emperors. Such a meeting took place between King Robert II of France and Emperor Henry II on 11 August 1023, where they swore mutual friendship and resolved to reform the clergy, calling for an assembly at Pavia of both German and Italian bishops.

Later in the eleventh century, upon after the death of his mother, Gisela of Swabia, in 1043, Emperor Henry III held a meeting in Ivois with King Henry I of France. It has been speculated that it may have been in connection with the emperor’s upcoming wedding with Agnes of Poitou. They met again in May 1056, and the matter of Lorraine was so contentious that the king challenged the emperor to single combat. The emperor left without a response in the dead of night, returning to Germany where the disaffected members of his domain were returning to obedience.

== Counts of Ivois ==
The known counts of Ivois are the following:

- Bérenger I (died 882 or before), son of Gebhard, Count of Niederlahngau.
- Hildebert (fl. 882), son of Bérenger I.
- Rudolfe I (died before 948), son of Ricfried, Count of Betuwe, and Herensinda.
- Rudolfe II (died 963), son of Rudolfe I. Also Count of Verdun (as Raoul).
- Étienne (died before 946 or 948). Also Count of Porcien.

Ricfried is also the great-grandfather of Giselbert, the first count of Looz. Presumably, the agreement above with Robert of Trier is with Étienne .

== Counts of Chiny ==
The Counts of Chiny begin with the first dynasty started by Otto:

- Otto I (956–987), son of Adalbert I, Count of Vermandois, and Gerberge of Lorraine.
- Louis I (987–1025), son of Otto. Married to Adélaïde de Saint Varme. Also, Count of Verdun. Murdered by Gothelo, brother of Herman, Count of Verdun.
- Louis II (1025 – before 1066), son of Louis I. Married to Sophie, daughter of Frederick, Count of Verdun.
- Arnold I (before 1066 – 1106), son of Louis II. Married to Adélaïs, daughter of Hilduin IV, Count of Montdidier, and Alix of Roucy.
- Otto II (1106–1131), son of Arnold I. Married to Adelaide, daughter of Albert III, Count of Namur, and Ida of Saxony.
- Albert I (1131–1162), son of Otto II. Married to Agnes, daughter of Reginald I, Count of Bar, and Gisèle of Vaudémont.
- Louis III (1162–1189), son of Albert I. Married to Sophie of Garlande. Died on the Third Crusade.
- Louis IV the Young (1189–1226), son of Louis III. Married to Matilda, daughter of James, Lord of Conde, and Adele, Lady of Guise.
- Joan (1226–1271), daughter of Louis IV. Married Arnold IV, Count of Loon, son of Gerard III, Count of Rieneck, and Kunigunde von Zimmern.

With the marriage of Joan and Arnold, the counties of Looz and Chiny became merged in a single office (with the exception of Louis V), beginning the second dynasty of counts.

- Arnold II (1228–1273). Also, Count of Looz (as Arnold IV).
- John I (1273–1278) (also, Count of Looz), eldest son of Arnold II and Joan. Married first to Matilda, daughter of William IV, Count of Jülich, and second to Isabelle, daughter of Jacques, Lord of Conde.
- Louis V (1278–1299), second son of Arnold II and Joan. Married Joan, a daughter of Henry II, Count of Bar, and Philippa of Dreux.
- Arnold III (1299–1328) (also, Count of Looz as Arnold V), son of John I. Married Margaret, daughter of Philip I, Count of Vianden, and Marie of Louvain,
- Louis VI (1328–1336) (also, Count of Looz as Louis IV), son of Arnold III. Married Margaret, daughter of Theobald II, Duke of Lorraine, and Isabella of Rumigny.
- Thierry de Heinsberg (1336–1361), grandson of Arnold III. Married Cunegonde de la Marck, daughter of Engelbert I, Count de la Marck, and Cunegonde Bliescastel.
- Godfrey de Heinsberg (1361–1362), great-grandson of Arnold III. Married Philippa of Jülich, daughter of William V, Duke of Jülich and Joanna of Hainaut.
- Arnold IV de Rumigny (1362–1364) (also Count of Looz as Arnold VI), grandson of Arnold III. He married Elizabeth of Flanders, illegitimate daughter of Louis I, Count of Nevers.

Arnold IV sold Chiny and Looz to Wenceslaus I, Duke of Luxembourg, on 16 June 1364, thus ending the line of Counts of Chiny and Looz.

There are many interesting family relationships among the counts of Ivois and Chiny that include two counts of Verdun and a host of others, including:

- Adelbero III of Chiny, Bishop of Verdun (1131–1156), son of Arnold I.
- Ida of Chiny, daughter of Otto II, married Godfrey I the Bearded, Count of Louvain (whose ancestor murdered her great-grandfather), and was the mother of Adeliza, Queen Consort of England, wife of Henry Beauclearc.
- Albero II, Bishop of Liège (1135–1145), son of Otto II.
- Arnulf of Chiny-Verdun, Bishop of Verdun (1172-1181), son of Albert I.
- Albert II of Hierges, Bishop of Verdun (1186–1208), grandson of Albert I.
- John I of Aspremont, Bishop of Verdun (1217–1224), great-grandson of Albert I.
- Arnaul II, Bishop of Châlons (1272–1273), son of Arnold II and Jeanne.

An alternate history of the origins of the Counts of Chiny is provided by Jean Bertels (known as Bertelius), abbot of Saint Gregory of Munster, who wrote of Chiny in his Historia Luxemburgensis, first published in Cologne in 1605. Here he claims that the territory now known as Chiny was owned by Ricuin, Duke of Mosellane [presumably, Ricwin, Count of Verdun], and it served as dowry for his younger daughter Mathilde in her marriage to Arnulf Grandson, a subject of Ricuin. Arnoul was granted the title Count of Chiny by Archbishop Bruno the Great after a high church was built. Thus Arnoul became the first Count of Chiny, father of Otto I. According to Laret-Kayser, this narrative is a complete fabrication, probably initiated in the thirteenth century by Count Louis V to enhance is standing at the Tournament of Chauvency by showing an ancestral line to the Counts of Verdun. Nevertheless, this version continues to be repeated.

== See also ==
- Liste des comtes de Chiny (list of counts in French)
