= Otto I of Chiny =

Otto I (Eudes) (died 987), Count of Chiny, perhaps son of Adalbert I the Pious, Count of Vermandois, and Gerberge of Lorraine. Although he probably did not use the title, Otto is regarded as the first Count of Chiny.

Historically, an Otto of Vermandois is mentioned in a charter of 958 alongside his father, the Count of Vermandois. His name and that of his brother Ludolfe show a Germanic ancestry of the kings of the family of Saxony, which is indeed the case, as his mother is Gerberge of Lorraine, niece of Emperor Otto I (her mother being daughter to Henry the Fowler). He was reported as a quarrelsome lord who threatened Hainaut and Cambrésis (the region around Cambrai).

In 971, an Otto erected a fortress in Warcq, Ardennes, and attacked his neighbors, including Adalbero, Archbishop of Reims. He is mentioned as having imperial ancestry. This and a number of other facts prompted the historian Léon Vanderkindere to hypothesize that these two Ottos were in fact a single historical figure.

His wife’s name is unknown. It is possible that she was from Ardennes, a relative of Wigeric of Lotharingia and Cunigunda of France, granddaughter of Louis the Stammerer. This could explain the name of his son and the appointment of the latter as Count of Verdun in 1024. Otto and his wife had one child:

- Louis I (d. 1025), Count of Chiny and Verdun.

Upon his death, Otto was succeeded as Count of Chiny by his son Louis.
