= Louis I of Chiny =

Louis I (murdered September 29, 1025), Count of Chiny (987–1025) and Count of Verdun (as Louis) (1024–1025), son of Otto I, Count of Chiny, and an unknown mother.

Upon Otto's death, Louis became the second Count of Chiny. Virtually nothing is known about his rule in Chiny.

In 1024, Reginbert, the Bishop of Verdun, appointed Louis as Count of Verdun when Count Herman of Ename, son of Godfrey the Prisoner, retired to a monastery. Herman's nephew, Godfrey the Bearded, coveted the position, and Gothelo (Herman's brother and Godfrey's father) invaded the city and murdered Louis.

Louis married Adelaide (d. after 1025), of unknown parentage. They had two children:

- Louis II, Count of Chiny
- Liutgarde (born 1002), married to Richer de Sancy (died before 1084). Luitgarde and Richer had four sons: Hughes (died after 1109), Louis (died after 1084), Roderic (d. after 1109) and Richwin (killed before 1084). Nothing further is known about them.

Louis’ son Louis II assumed the position of Count of Chiny after his father's death, and Godfrey the Bearded was appointed Count of Verdun.
