= Albert I of Vermandois =

Count of Vermadois from c.946 to 987

Adalbert I
- Count of Vermandois
- Tenure: 943-987
- Predecessor: Herbert II
- Successor: Herbert III
- Born: c. 930
- Died: 8 September 987
- Family: Carolingian dynasty
- Spouse: Gerberge of Lorraine
- Issue: Herbert III of Vermandois; Otto I, Count of Chiny; Liudolfe of Vermandois
- Father: Herbert II of Vermandois
- Mother: Adela of France

Adalbert I of Vermandois (French: Albert I le Pieux, the Pious) (c. 930–c. 8 September 987), was the son of Herbert II of Vermandois and Adela of France, daughter of Robert I of France. Born about 915, he succeeded his father as Count of Vermandois in 946.

== Life ==
Adalbert, also known as Albert, assisted his brother Count Herbert in his marriage to Queen "Ottobega" (Eadgifu of Wessex), the mother of Louis IV of France. Adalbert's men escorted (some sources say abducted) Ottobega from the convent in Laon where she resided to her marriage with Herbert, which in turn enraged King Louis. There was a prior history between Louis IV and the House of Vermandois as Adalbert's father Herbert II was responsible for the capture, imprisonment and death in captivity of Louis's father King Charles the Simple as well as Louis's own exile to England as an infant. Louis confiscated his mother's holdings, the abbey of Saint Mary in Laon which he gave to his wife Gerberga of Saxony and the royal fisc of Attigny. In 957, Adalbert and his brother, Robert Count of Meaux and Troyes, were adherents of King Lothair of France. (Note: Albert, through his marriage to Gerberge of Lorraine became the brother-in-law to both Lothar King of France and Charles Duke of Lower Lorraine. Gerberge, Lothar and Charles were all children of Gerberga of Saxony and all three, like Albert, were Carolingians.)

When Charles, Duke of Lower Lorraine decided to assert his rights to the throne he was aided by Albert and his two nephews, Herbert III, Count of Meaux and Odo I, Count of Blois. The two aided Charles in his plots and continued to make trouble for the new king even after Charles was captured and imprisoned.

Albert was slow to acknowledge the election of Hugh Capet as King of the Franks. On learning that Hugh intended to attack him, Albert sent Dudo of Saint-Quentin to Normandy to see if Duke Richard I, Duke of Normandy would use his influence to keep the peace between them, which apparently the duke did. For his part Hugh Capet had been suspicious that Albert was about to rebel against him. Albert, Count of Vermandois, died on 8 September 987 and was succeeded by his son Herbert III.

== Family ==
In 954 he married Gerberge of Lorraine († 978), (Note: When they married, Albert and Gerberge were well within the seven degrees of consanguinity decreed by canon law at the time. They were third cousins once removed. However this branch of the Carolingians was following its own marital alliance policy irrespective of church canons. The marriage between Adalbert and Gerberge is an example of what is called affinal "relinkings" (French: renchaînement alliance) a term for a couple descended from common ancestors with multiple marriages between the two families over several generations. These alliances were deliberately maintained outside the control of the church.) daughter of Giselbert, Duke of Lorraine, and his wife Gerberga of Saxony.

Their children were:

- Herbert III of Vermandois
- Otto I, Count of Chiny (c. 950/955–987), progenitor of the Chiny branch of the Carolingian dynasty
- Liudolfe of Vermandois, Bishop of Noyon and Tournai (c. 957–986)

== Sources ==
- Fanning, Steven; Bachrach, Bernard S., eds. (2011). The Annals of Flodoard of Reims, 916–966. University of Toronto Press.
- Koziol, Geoffrey (1992). Begging Pardon and Favor: Ritual and Political Order in Early Medieval France. Cornell University Press.
- Le Jan, Régine (2003). Famille et pouvoir dans le monde franc (VII-X siècle) essai d'anthropologie sociale. Publications de la Sorbonne.
- McKitterick, Rosamond (1999). The Frankish Kingdoms under the Carolingians, 751-987. Longman.
- Pac, Grzegorz (2022). Grzegorz Pac. Brill.
- Scott, John; Carrington, Peter J., eds. (2011). The SAGE Handbook of Social Network Analysis. SAGE.
- Shopkow, Lea (2002). "The Man from Vermandois: Dudo of St-Quentin and His Patrons', Religion, Text, and Society". In Burman, Thomas E; Hillgarth, Jocelyn N; Shopkow, Lea (eds.). Medieval Spain and Northern Europe: Essays in Honor of J.N. Hillgarth. Pontifical Institute of Mediaeval Studies.
- Tanner, Heather J (2004). Families, friends and allies : Boulogne and politics in Northern France and England, c. 879-1160. Brill.
- Vanderkindere, Léon (1902). La Formation territoriale des principautés belges au Moyen Âge (in French). Vol. 2. H. Lamertin, Libraire-Editeur.
