= Arnold VI of Rummen, Count of Loon =

Arnold VI de Rumigny (died May 1373), Count of Looz and Count of Chiny (as Arnold IV) (1362–1364), son of William of Oreye, Lord of Rumigny (by donation of Louis IV, Count of Looz in 1331), and Jeanne de Looz, daughter of Arnold V, Count of Loon and Chiny, and, Marguerite Vianden, Lady of Perwez and Grimbergen.

In 1336, at the death of his uncle, Louis IV, Count of Loon and Chiny, Arnold laid claim to the estates, but without success. Instead, the estates passed to another nephew, Thierry de Heinsberg. Finally, on January 25, 1362, he bought the rights to the counties from his cousin Godfrey, Count of Looz and Chiny. Looz, however, was still occupied by the troops of Engelbert III of the Marck, Prince-Bishop of Liege.

On December 25, Arnold approached the Emperor Charles IV for his help in financing the reconquest of Looz, but he failed in that endeavor. Without options, he sold the counties to Wenceslaus, Duke of Luxembourg, on June 16, 1364. On September 23, 1366, he entered into a transaction with John of Arkel, Prince-Bishop of Liège, receiving some financial compensation for the occupation of the counties

In 1346, Arnold married Elizabeth of Flanders, illegitimate daughter of Louis of Flanders, Count of Nevers. No children are recorded.
