= Arnold IV of Loon =

Belgian noble

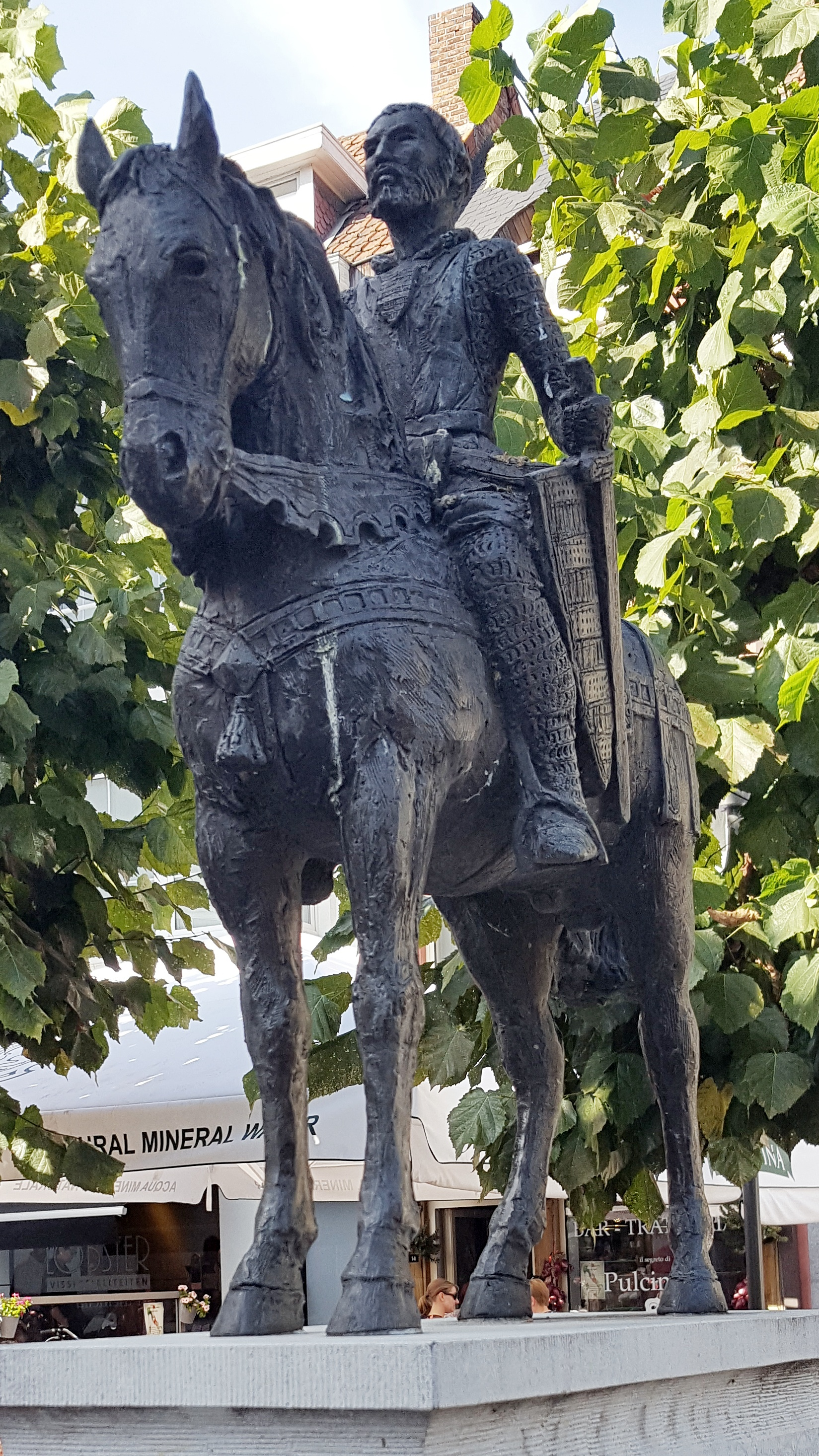
Equestrian statue of Arnold IV in Hasselt, Belgium

Arnold IV of Loon (Looz) (died between November 1272 and October 1273; most likely on February 22, 1273), was Count of Loon from 1227 to 1273 and Count of Chiny (as Arnold II) from 1228 to 1268. He was the son of Gérard III, Count of Rieneck and Cunegonde von Zimmern.

His marriage to Jeanne de Chiny brought him the County of Chiny. In 1227, his brother Louis III gave him the County of Loon. In 1234, he took part in a crusade at the request of Pope Gregory IX against the Statingers, heretics, probably Cathar, located in the diocese of Bremen. Then he helped Jean d'Eppes, bishop of Liege in repelling attacks Waleran, Lord of Valkenburg, in 1238. The following year he reconciles Henry II, Duke of Brabant and Wautier Bertout, Lord of Mechelen. In 1240, he joined forces with the dukes of Brabant and Limburg an attempt to reconcile Pope Gregory IX with Emperor Frederick II.

In 1244, a war is contrasted with Henry of Heinsberg. The dispute between the pope and the emperor festered, the pope excommunicated the emperor, and called on voters to choose another: William of Holland and Arnold attended his coronation. To keep their fiefdoms from suffering the disorders of anarchy following the death of Frederick II, Bishop of Liege, the Duke of Brabant, and Count of Gelderland entered a confederation entrusted with their common defense.

Arnold enjoyed the esteem and confidence of his contemporaries, and arbitrated several disputes to this title. He granted freedom to Hasselt and Kuringen, granted city status in Bilzen and made several donations to monasteries.

Arnold and Jeanne had the following children:

- John, Count of Chiny and Loon
- Arnaul II (d. 1273), Bishop of Châlons (1272-1273)
- Henri de Looz, Seigneur d’Agimont
- Gerard de Looz (d. after Apr 1284), Seigneur de Chauvency le-Château, married Marguerite de Meurs
- Elisabeth (d. before 1251) married first Thomas III of Coucy, Seigneur of Vervins, and second Albert, Seigneur of Voorne
- Adelaide (d. after 1268), married to Thierry II, Seigneur of Valkenburg
- Juliane, married to Nicolas, Seigneur of Quiévrain
- Louis V, Count of Chiny
- Marguerite (d. 1292), married Willem IV, Seigneur of Horn.

Arnold was succeeded by his son John as Count of Looz and his son Louis as Count of Chiny.

== Sources ==
- JJ. Thonissen, "Arnold IV, Royal Academy of Belgium, National Biography, vol. 1, Brussels, 1866, p. 451-455
