= Gerberge of Lorraine =

Countess consort of Vermadois from c. 954 to 978

Gerberge of Lorraine (c. 935-978) was the daughter of Giselbert, Duke of Lorraine, and Gerberga of Saxony, daughter of Henry I the Fowler, King of Germany. She was a descendant of Charlemagne through both her parents. Gerberge died sometime after 7 September 978.

In or before 954, she married Adalbert I of Vermandois of the Carolingian dynasty. Their children were:

- Herbert III of Vermandois
- Otto of Vermandois, perhaps identical to Otto I, Count of Chiny (c. 956–c. 983–87)
- Liudolfe of Vermandois, Bishop of Noyon and Tournai (c. 957–986)
