= Liudolf of Vermandois =

French Catholic bishop

Liudolf of Vermandois (died before 9 November 986), son of Adalbert I, Count of Vermandois, and Gerberge of Lorraine.

Luidolf was appointed Bishop of Noyon in 979 after the death of his predecessor Hadulphe, as reported by Flodoard. Lothair, King of West Francia, dedicated the monastery of Saint-Eloy de Noyon in Liudolf's memory.

== Sources ==
- Le Jan, Regine (2000). "Continuity and Change in the Tenth Century Nobility". In Duggan, Anne (ed.). Nobles and Nobility in Medieval Europe: Concepts, Origins, Transformations. The Boydell Press.
