= Chiny =

City in Wallonia, Belgium

Chiny Tchini (Walloon)
- City and municipality
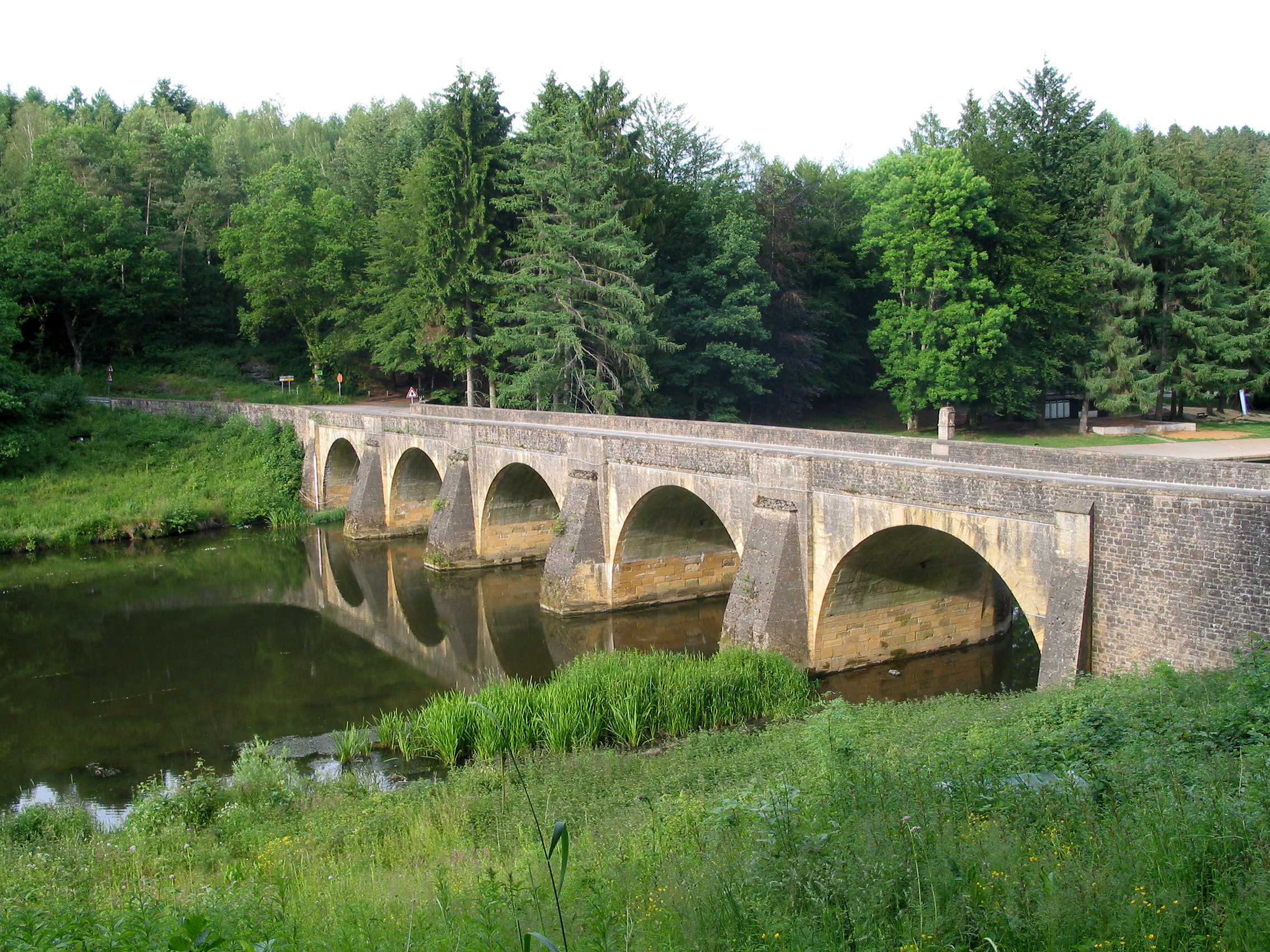
- Chiny: St Nicholas's bridge on the River Semois

- Flag Coat of arms

- Location of Chiny in Luxembourg province
- Interactive map of Chiny
- Location in Belgium
- Coordinates: 49°44.3′N 05°20.6′E
- Country: Belgium
- Community: French Community
- Region: Wallonia
- Province: Luxembourg
- Arrondissement: Virton

Government
  - Mayor: Sébastian Pirlot (deputy)
  - Governing party: deputy

Area
  - Total: 114.06 km^{2} (44.04 sq mi)

Population (2018-01-01)
  - Total: 5,175
  - Density: 45.37/km^{2} (117.5/sq mi)
- Postal codes: 6810-6813
- NIS code: 85007
- Area codes: 061
- Website: www.chiny.be

Chiny (French pronunciation: [ʃini]; Walloon: Tchini) is a city and municipality of Wallonia located in the province of Luxembourg, Belgium.

On 1 January 2018 the municipality, which covers 113.69 km^{2} (43.90 sq mi), had 5,175 inhabitants, giving a population density of 46 inhabitants per km^{2}.

The municipality consists of the following districts: Chiny, Izel, Jamoigne, Les Bulles, Suxy, and Termes.

== Geography ==
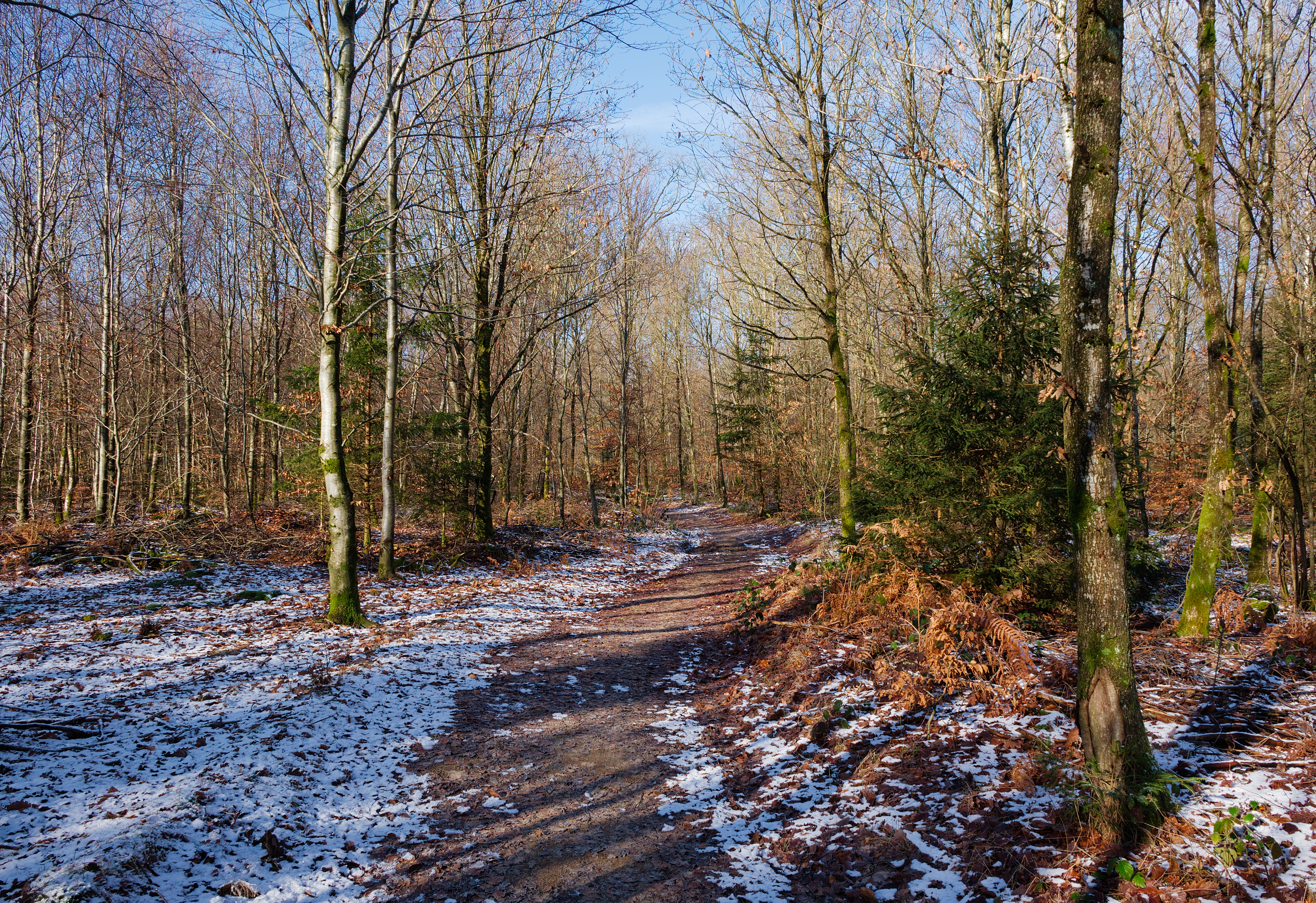
Walking trail in Chiny

Chiny is located on the boundary between the geographical regions of the Gaume and the Ardennes.

The name Chiny also refers historically to a former county, larger than the current municipality.

Other population centers include:

- Frenois
- La Haïlleule
- La Mouline
- Moyen
- Pin
- Pont Charreau
- Prouvy
- Romponcelle
- Valansart

== Coat of arms ==
The French blazon reads: D’azur à trois poissons d’argent posés en fasce et surmontés d’une couronne d’or.

The municipality's arms might in English heraldic language be described thus: Azure three fish fesswise in pale argent and in chief a crown Or.

== History of counts of Chiny ==
Historical affiliations

County of Chiny 980–1364
Duchy of Luxembourg 1364–1795, part of:
Burgundian Netherlands 1443–1482
Habsburg Netherlands 1482–1556
Spanish Netherlands 1556–1714
Austrian Netherlands 1714–1794
French Republic 1795–1804
French Empire 1804–1815
Grand Duchy of Luxembourg 1815–1839
Kingdom of Belgium 1839–present

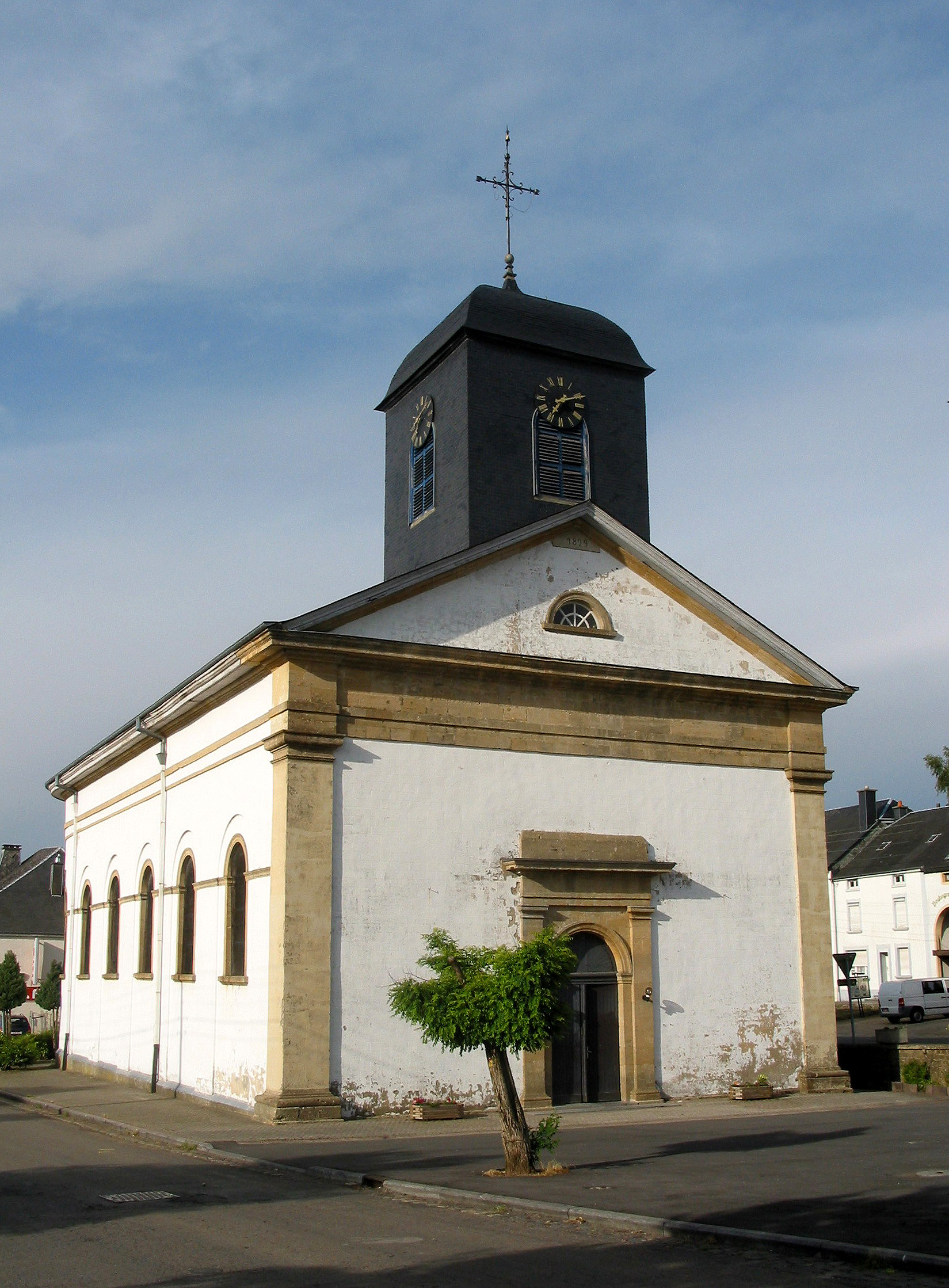
Saint Walpurga's church

The first dynasty ruled from 980 to 1384.

From 980, Arnoul of Burgundy-Granson, became the first Count of Chiny. By his marriage to Mathilde, daughter of Ricuin, Duke of Mosellane and Count of Ardennes, he acquired the dowry of his wife, a land of forests rich with game, crossed by a capricious river, the Semois. His son Othon of Warcq, left his small fortress on the Meuse to site the Château de Chiny on a rocky spur overlooking the river. In the eleventh century, the Château was a formidable barrier in the region. The area that was ruled by the count was huge: 246 towns, 57 castles, 1412 villages.

The fourth count, Louis II, loved hunting parties and held them in his huge game park starting in 1040. It was then that the legend relates that a young lord named Thibault, a descendant of the Counts of Champagne, secretly left his father's house to offer his services in the Ardennes forest near Chiny, where he established a hermitage and found a source of holy springs. Louis II built a large shrine to the spring's healing powers. The shrine became famous, with many pilgrims who came to implore the grace of Saint-Thibault. Later, monks from Calabria, Italy, founded an abbey in nearby Orval.

Arnoul, a successor, regularly confronted Count Godfrey of Bouillon, leader of the First Crusade and nephew of Queen Mathilde. They eventually became friends and Arnoul entrusted Godfrey both his sons, Otto and Louis, to take part in the First Crusade. Returning from the Crusade, Otto, was in turn Count of Chiny, but he found Orval falling in ruins. The Calabrian monks left in 1108, and the Cistercians revived Orval.

Louis IV was the last count of the first dynasty. Having no son, he prepared Jeanne, his eldest daughter, as his successor. Louis IV marked his reign by the first postage stamp in the county.

In marrying Jeanne, Arnulf of Looz became the first Count of the second dynasty. He was notable as the builder of the fortress of Montmedy. Their son, Louis V held a tournament of chivalry in 1284 that was regarded as the finest in the Middle Ages, at the village de Chauvency-le-Château. Over 500 knights of Europe attended this tournament and were memorialized in a narrative poem by Jacques Bretel. Louis V enjoyed great notoriety as a result. He died in 1299. His heart, per his last wishes, was embalmed and buried in a lead box in front of the altar at Saint-Thibault, in the village of Suxy.

Thereafter, the counts struggled to maintain their territory as wars and battles ensued. They were by turn, the vassals of the Count of Bar and John the Blind, King of Bohemia and Count of Luxembourg, all claiming the same lands. Seven Counts were named in less than thirty years. The father of Arnould Rumigny, last Count of Chiny died of pneumonia a few months before the birth of his son. His young widow died in childbirth, and the son, Arnould, sold his lands rather than allow his malevolent uncle's offspring to inherit. On 13 June 1364, the lands of Chiny were sold to Wenceslas, Duke of Luxembourg.

Later, in the 15th century, the Count de Faing was created and his Château was erected, which was later reconstructed and stands today.

== See also ==
- List of protected heritage sites in Chiny
- List of counts of Chiny (in French)
