= List of protected heritage sites in Chiny =

This table shows an overview of the protected heritage sites in the Walloon town Bouillon. This list is part of Belgium's national heritage.

| Object | Year/architect | Town/section | Address | Coordinates | Number^{?} | Image |
|---|---|---|---|---|---|---|
| Part of the route down the slope between the rocks of Hat, and Rehat Rousses ^{(nl)} ^{(fr)} | | Chiny | | 49.743449°N 5.318129°E | 85007-CLT-0001-01 Info | |
| complex comprising the old watermill at Saint-Nicolas Bridge and the surrounding grounds | | Chiny | | 49.741877°N 5.346249°E | 85007-CLT-0002-01 Info | |
| Church of Saint-Pierre and the ensemble of the church and surrounding areas ^{(nl)} ^{(fr)} | | Chiny | | 49.697610°N 5.421677°E | 85007-CLT-0003-01 Info | Kerk Saint-Pierre en het ensemble van de kerk en omliggende terreinen |
| House in a place called "La Baronnie": facades and roofs of buildings and the surrounding walls that enclose the property and the area located within the surrounding walls ^{(nl)} ^{(fr)} | | Chiny | rue Saint-Pierre n°19 | 49.695533°N 5.422261°E | 85007-CLT-0004-01 Info | |
| old calvary ^{(nl)} ^{(fr)} | | Chiny | rue d'Arlon | 49.691735°N 5.450119°E | 85007-CLT-0005-01 Info | |
| Washing place of Fresnois: facades and roofs, and the bins ^{(nl)} ^{(fr)} | | Chiny | rue d'Arlon | 49.691548°N 5.450549°E | 85007-CLT-0007-01 Info | |
| Washing place of Valansart: facades and roof, and the bins ^{(nl)} ^{(fr)} | | Chiny | rue du Mémartinet | 49.685151°N 5.419243°E | 85007-CLT-0008-01 Info | |
| Washing place and two gutter channels on the western side of it in Prouvy ^{(nl)} ^{(fr)} | | Chiny | rue de la Fontaine | 49.685427°N 5.437644°E | 85007-CLT-0009-01 Info | |
| Washing place on the axis of the Grand'Rue, today called rue de la Centenaire ^{(nl)} ^{(fr)} | | Chiny | | 49.695988°N 5.416425°E | 85007-CLT-0010-01 Info | |
| Beech hedge and the adjacent area ^{(nl)} ^{(fr)} | | Chiny | rue Cornisselle | 49.739922°N 5.331908°E | 85007-CLT-0012-01 Info | |
| Washing place on the corner of rue de la Fontaine and rue des Combattants (now rue des Chasseurs Ardennais) ^{(nl)} ^{(fr)} | | Chiny | Izel | 49.693807°N 5.375750°E | 85007-CLT-0013-01 Info | |
| Church of Saint-Pierre and the wall of the cemetery and the ensemble of the surrounding area ^{(nl)} ^{(fr)} | | Chiny | | 49.694695°N 5.373144°E | 85007-CLT-0014-01 Info | Kerk Saint-Pierre en de muur van de begraafplaats en het ensemble van de directe omgeving |
| Belle-Vue Farm: facades and roofs ^{(nl)} ^{(fr)} | | Chiny | rue de la Chavée n°6 | 49.694104°N 5.420906°E | 85007-CLT-0017-01 Info | |
| Devtional niche, or "potale" of Sainte-Gertrude, locally called Thiryfays ^{(nl)} ^{(fr)} | | Chiny | | 49.711393°N 5.350296°E | 85007-CLT-0018-01 Info | |
| Some parts of the neo-Gothic castle Faing ^{(nl)} ^{(fr)} | | Chiny | | 49.694482°N 5.411124°E | 85007-CLT-0019-01 Info | Bepaalde delen van het neogotische kasteel van Faing |
| Land forming an extension of the complex comprising the Pont Saint-Nicolas watermill and its surroundings | | Chiny | | 49.738951°N 5.351281°E | 85007-CLT-0025-01 Info | |

== See also ==
- List of protected heritage sites in Luxembourg (Belgium)
- Bouillon
