= Louis III of Chiny =

Louis III (d. August 12? 1189), Count of Chiny, son of Albert, Count of Chiny, and his spouse Agnes of Bar.

He succeeded his father in 1162 and continued the family's support of the Abbey of Orval. He entered the Third Crusade alongside Emperor Frederick I Barbarossa, dying in transit in Belgrade.

He married Sophie (d. 1207), whose family is unknown. Their children were:

- Louis IV, Count of Chiny
- Gertrude, married to Thierry II, Seigneur de Walcourt, Count of Montaigu.

Upon his death, his son Louis assumed the role of Count of Chiny.
