= Joan of Chiny =

Belgian noblewoman (d. 1271)

Joan (c. 1205 – 17 January 1271) was the Countess of Chiny and last descendant of the male line of the Carolingian dynasty. Joan was the daughter of Louis IV, Count of Chiny, and Matilda of Avesnes, and became ruler of the county upon her father’s death on 7 October 1226. She married Arnold IV, Count of Loon, son of Gerard III, Count of Rieneck, and Kunigunde von Zimmern, in 1228, whereupon he assumed the role of Count of Chiny.

Joan and Arnold had the following children:

- John I, Count of Chiny and Loon
- Arnaul II (died 1273), Bishop of Châlons (1272–73)
- Henry, Seigneur d’Agimont
- Gerard (died after April 1284), Seigneur de Chauvency le-Château, married Marguerite de Meurs
- Elisabeth (died before 1251), married Thomas III of Coucy, Seigneur of Vervins, and Albert, Seigneur of Voorne
- Adelaide (died after 1268), married to Thierry II, Seigneur of Valkenburg
- Juliana, married to Nicolas, Seigneur of Quiévrain
- Louis V, Count of Chiny
- Margaret (died 1292)?, married William IV, Lord of Horn

She was succeeded as ruler of Chiny by her husband, Arnold II, Count of Chiny.
