= Louis V =

Louis V may refer to:

- Louis V of France (967–987)
- Louis IV, Holy Roman Emperor and V of Germany (1282–1347)
- Louis V of Bavaria (1315–1361)
- Louis V, Elector Palatine (ruled 1508–1544)
- Louis V of Hesse-Darmstadt (ruled 1596–1626)
- Louis Joseph, Prince of Condé (1736–1818)
- Louis Vuitton, luxury goods and fashion company, also its eponymous founder
