= Louis IV of Chiny =

Louis IV the Young (1173 – 7 October 1226), count of Chiny from 1189 to 1226, son of Louis III, count of Chiny, and Sophie. Louis was the last of the first dynasty of counts of Chiny. Having no son, he prepared his eldest daughter Jeanne as his successor. Louis marked his reign by issuing the first postage stamp in the county.

He succeeded as count in 1189 when his father died on the Third Crusade, but was under the supervision of his mother and uncle Thierry, Lord of Mellier, because of his young age. He likely participated in the Albigensian Crusade, where he died in Cahors.

He married Matilda of Avesnes, widow of Nicolas IV, Lord of Rumigny, and daughter of James, Lord of Avesnes and Conde, and Adele, Lady of Guise. They had three children:

- Jeanne, Countess of Chiny, married to Arnold IV, Count of Looz
- Agnes, Lady of Givet and Abemont
- Isabelle, married to Otto, Lord of Trazegnies.

Isabelle was referred to as Madame de Florenville during the Tournament of Chauvency in 1285, hosted by Louis' grandson Louis V, successor Count of Chiny,

Upon Louis’ death, his daughter Jeanne became Countess of Chiny until her marriage to Arnold IV, when he became the first Count of Chiny of the second dynasty as Arnold II.

== Sources ==
- Settipani, Christian, La Préhistoire des Capétiens (Nouvelle histoire généalogique de l'auguste maison de France, vol. 1), Villeneuve d'Ascq, éd. Patrick van Kerrebrouck, 1993, 545 pg.
- Arlette Laret-Kayser, Entre Bar et Luxembourg : Le Comté de Chiny des Origines à 1300, Bruxelles (éditions du Crédit Communal, Collection Histoire, série in-8°, n° 72), 1986
