= Diederik of Heinsberg, Count of Loon =

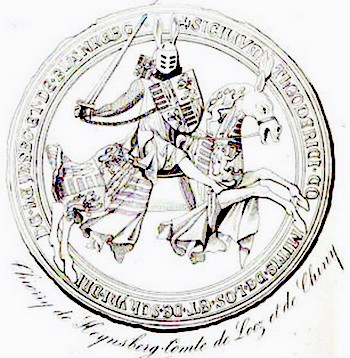
Thierry de Heinsberg

Diederik of Heinsberg (French: Thierry, German: Dietrich, English: Theodoric) (died between 17 and 21 January 1361) was the Count of Loon (French: Looz) and Count of Chiny (1336–1361).

== Biography ==
He was the son of Godfrey II, Lord of Heinsberg (son of Diederik, Lord of Heinsberg, and Joanna of Leuven), and Matilda (daughter of Arnold V, Count of Loon and Chiny, and Marguerite Vianden).

In 1336, Diederik married Kunigunde of the Mark, (d. 1343), daughter of Engelbert I, Count of the Mark, and Kunigonde of Blieskastel, sister of Adolph of the Marck and Eberhard II, Count of the Mark (also his uncle through marriage to Matilda's sister Marie).

Diederik and Kunigunde had one son:

- Godfrey of Loon-Heinsberg (died 1342 in the Prussian Crusade), married in 1336 to Mathilde of Guelders (d.1384), daughter of Reginald II, Duke of Guelders, and Sophie Berthout, Lady of Mechelen. No issue.

In 1336, Diederik's uncle Louis IV, Count of Loon and Chiny, died without having had children, and a succession crises emerged. An agreement of 1190 stipulated that if the House of Loon were extinguished, the county would then be integrated with the Principality of Liège.

The reaction of the Chapter of Saint-Lambert was immediate. The Prince-Bishop of Liège, Adolph of La Marck moved to incorporate the County of Loon into the principality, while Diederik maneuvered to assume the title of count. However, since Diederik had married Adolph's sister and the bishop was fond of their son, family relations won out. Until his death in 1344, the prelate used all of his influence to ensure that the county remained in possession of his brother-in-law.

But the death of the bishop did not terminate possession the Counties of Loon and Chiny by the Heinsbergs, because Adolph's nephew Engelbert III succeeded him as Prince-Bishop of Liège. Engelbert removed the threat of excommunication pronounced against Diederik and allowed him to remain at the head of the counties until his death.

Upon his death in 1361, Diederik's nephew and heir, Godfrey of Heinsberg, Lord of Daelenbroeck, claimed the counties of Loon and Chiny, while the Prince-Bishopric of Liège claimed it as fief of the church. This led to the War of the Loon Succession.

== Sources ==
- Marchandisse, Alain, La fonction épiscopale à Liège aux xiiie et xive siècles: étude de politologie historique, Bibliothèque de la Faculté de Philosophie et de Lettres de l'Université de Liège, 1998
- Arlette Laret-Kayser, Entre Bar et Luxembourg : Le Comté de Chiny des Origines à 1300, Bruxelles (éditions du Crédit Communal, Collection Histoire, série in-8°, n° 72), 1986
