= John I of Looz =

John I (Jean) (d. 1278 or 1279), Count of Looz and Count of Chiny, eldest son of Arnold IV, Count of Looz and Chiny, and Jeanne, Countess of Chiny. He succeeded his father in 1272 or 1273, as the Count of Looz and Chiny. Virtually nothing is known about his reign.

He first married, in 1258, Matilda, daughter of William IV, Count of Jülich, and Matilda of Gelderland. Their children were:

- Arnold V, Count of Looz and Count of Chiny (as Arnold II)
- Louis de Looz
- William, Seigneur of Neufchatel and Ardenne.

Widowed, he married secondly, in 1269, Isabelle de Conde (d. after 1280), daughter of Jacques, Seigneur of Conde and Bailleul, and his wife Agnes of Rœulx. Their children were:

- John II (1270-1311), Seigneur of Agimont, Givet and Warcq, married Marie, daughter of Raoul de Nesle and Alix de Roye (see House of Nesle)
- Jacques (Jacquemin) (d. February 27, 1330), Canon of Liege.

Upon his death, he was succeeded as Count of Chiny by his brother Louis, and as Count of Looz by his son Arnold.
