= Tournament of Chauvency =

1285 French-German tournament

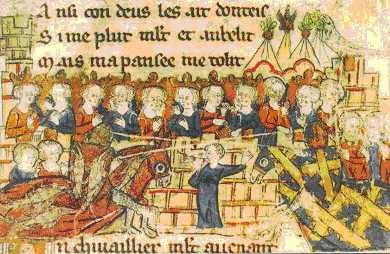
An illustration for Bretel's poem

The Tournament of Chauvency was held for six days from 1 October 1285 in the village of Chauvency-le-Château, near Montmédy. It was attended by knights of France and Germany for jousting and other activities, including mass, mêlées, discussions of chivalric values and awarding of the chaplet.

The tournament was dedicated to Henry IV, Count of Salm, and organised by Louis V, Count of Chiny. Louis V used the occasion to promote his family's illustrious history, from being descended from Charlemagne to his ancestor Arnold I, Count of Chiny, sending his sons to fight in the First Crusade.

The events were documented in the poem le Tournoi de Chauvency by the 13th-century trouvère Jacques Bretel, signed and dated on October 1285. The miniatures of the Oxford manuscript show knights struggling during the jousting and other activities of the tournament.

The tournament's attendance was significant: at least seventeen jousts are accounted in the poem. One mêlée opposed knights of the Duchy of Lorraine (in the Holy Roman Empire) and those of the County of Flanders (Kingdom of France), "a fierce and sustained battle" won by the Lorrainians.

== Attendants ==
61 knights, 41 ladies and 16 heralds are explicitly named in the Bretel poem; more likely attended. Notable attendants include:

- Rudolf I, King of Germany
- Ottokar II, King of Bohemia (in conflicting report: he was killed at the Battle on the Marchfeld, 1278)
- Frederick III, Duke of Lorraine
- John I, Duke of Brabant
- Jean de Faucogney, viscount of Vesoul
- Theobald II, Count of Bar
  - Henry III, son
  - John of Bar, son
- Louis V, Count of Chiny
  - Jeanne of Bar, wife
  - Thomas of Blankenberg, stepson (son of Jeanne and of her first husband Frederick de Blâmont)
- Gerard de Looz, Seigneur de Chauvency le-Château, brother of Louis V
- Henry V "the Blond", Count of Luxembourg
  - Margaret of Bar, wife
- Henry VI, Count of Luxembourg
  - Béatrice d'Avesnes, wife of the previous
- Waleran I, Lord of Ligny
- Guy of Dampierre, Count of Flanders
  - Philip of Chieti, youngest son
- John of Avesnes (in conflicting report: he died in 1257)
  - John II, Count of Holland, son
- Florent of Hainaut
- Renaud I, Count of Dammartin.
