= Louis II of Chiny =

Louis II (died before 1066), Count of Chiny (from 1025 until his death), son of Louis I, Count of Chiny and Verdun, and Adélaïde de Saint Varme. He left very few traces in history and nothing is known about his reign. These areas were at the time part of Lower Lotharingia.

Louis was married to Sophie, daughter of Frederick, Count of Verdun. They had two children:

- Arnold I, Count of Chiny
- Manasses (died 1068), a monk at the Church of St. Hubert.

Legend has it that Louis held hunting parties in his huge game park. Here, Thibault of Champagne established a hermitage and found a source of holy springs, and Louis built a shrine to the spring's healing powers. The shrine became famous, with many pilgrims who came to implore the grace of Saint-Thibault. Later, monks from Calabria, Italy, founded a monastery nearby at Orval at the invitation of Louis’ son Arnold.

Upon Louis' death, his son Arnold became Count of Chiny.
