= Adolf II (bishop of Liège) =

German nobleman

Adolph II von der Mark (English: Adolph II of the Mark) (August 1288 – Clermont-sur-Meuse, 3 November 1344) was the Prince-Bishop of Liège from 1313 until his death in 1344.

Adolph was the third son of Count Eberhard I of the Mark and Mary of Loon.

Aged only 25, but through the influence of King Philip IV of France, he became Prince-Bishop of Liège in 1313.

The people of the Prince-Bishopric opposed his authoritarian way of ruling. In 1316, he was forced to sign the Peace of Fexhe, which has been compared to Magna Carta and which limited his powers. When he tried to revert the treaty, he was forced to flee from Liège to Huy at the end of 1324. From here, he placed Liège under interdict.

In 1333, he sold the Lordship of Mechelen to the Count of Flanders. He intervened in the War of Awans and Waroux and participated in the 1334 siege of Maastricht. When Louis VI of Loon died in 1336 without an heir, he tried to annex the County of Loon, but without success.

In 1343, his power was reduced further with the creation of the Tribunal of the XXII, an independent court. He died the next year and was succeeded by his nephew Engelbert III of the Marck.

Adolph of the Marck House of La Marck Born: 1288 Died: 3 November 1344
Catholic Church titles
Regnal titles
Preceded by Theobald of Bar	Prince-Bishop of Liège as Adolph II; 1313–1344	Succeeded by Engelbert III of the Marck
