= Louis V of Chiny =

Count of Chiny from 1268 to 1299

Louis V (1235–1299), Count of Chiny from 1268 to 1299, the youngest son of Arnold IV, Count of Looz and Chiny, and Jeanne, Countess of Chiny. He became Count of Chiny in 1268 when his parents entrusted him with the county before their death.

In 1285, he brought to Chauvency-le-Château one of the most famous jousting tournaments (a “tournament of chivalry”) of the Middle Ages, which pitted knights from the Empire, France, Lotharingia, Hainault, Flanders, and England, against each other in two days of solo-contest jousting and a final day of massed mêlée fighting. The Tournament of Chauvency (Tournament of Chauvency) was described in verse by the French poet Jacques Bretel. A list of the participants at the tournament, which includes nearly 100 named individuals, can be found here.

Before 22 July 1257, he married Jeanne de Bar (1225–1299), widow of Frederick de Blâmont (d. 1255/6) and daughter of Henry II, Count of Bar, and Philippa de Dreux. Her dowry was the castle of Salm. Jeanne already had three children from her first marriage: Henry (d.1331) sire de Blâmont and seneschal of Lorraine, Joffroi (mentioned in 1253) and Thomas (princier of Verdun and subsequently Bishop, d.1305). Until she became Countess of Chiny in spring 1268 she was styled as 'dame de Blâmont' and used her own seal.

Louis and Jeanne had no children and, after his death, Chiny reverted to his nephew Arnold V of Looz.

== Sources ==
- Collin, Hubert (1988). Lotharingia: archives lorraines d'archéologie, d'art et d'histoire (in French). Vol. 1–2. Société Thierry Alix.
- Mayhew, N.J. (1983). Sterling Imitations of Edwardian Type. Royal Numismatic Society.
