= Francis Douce =

English antiquary and curator

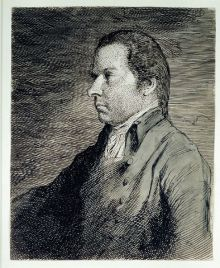
- Born: 1757; London, England
- Died: 30 March, 1834 (aged 76–77)
- Education: Gray's Inn
- Occupations: Antiquary, museum curator
- Writing career
- Years active: 1779–1834
- Period: Late 18th to early 19th century
- Genres: Antiquities, criticism, history
- Subjects: Shakespeare, dance of Death, customs and manners

Francis Douce (/ˈdaʊs/ DOWS; 1757 – 30 March 1834) was a British antiquary and museum curator.

== Biography ==
Douce was born in London. His father was a clerk in Chancery. After completing his education he entered his father's office, but soon quit it to devote himself to the study of antiquities. He became a prominent member of the Society of Antiquaries, and from 1799 to 1811 served as Keeper of Manuscripts in the British Museum, but was compelled to resign owing to a quarrel with one of the trustees.

Francis attended a school in Richmond, where he became proficient in Latin and made some progress with Greek, before suddenly relocating to a French academy. After his schooling, he entered the Gray's Inn in 1779 and was admitted an attorney of the King's Bench. In the same year, Francis was elected a fellow of the Society of Antiquaries and in 1781 was admitted to use the British Museum Library.

In 1807 he published his Illustrations of Shakespeare and Ancient Manners (2 vols. 8vo), which contained some curious information, along with a great deal of trifling criticism and mistaken interpretation. An unfavourable notice of the work in The Edinburgh Review greatly irritated the author, and made him unwilling to venture any further publications. He contributed, however, a considerable number of papers to the Archaeologia and The Gentleman's Magazine. In 1833 he published a Dissertation on the various Designs of the Dance of Death, the substance of which had appeared forty years before.

In 1807 the British Museum recruited him to the Department of Manuscripts, where in the same year he succeeded Robert Nares as Keeper. His relationship with the museum was uneasy from the start, so that after only five years' service he resigned in 1811.

In 1823 he received a bequest of £50,000 from the estate of the sculptor Joseph Nollekens, which enabled him to buy the finest printed books and manuscripts that came on to the market.

He died on 30 March 1834.

In his will he left his printed books, illuminated manuscripts, coins &c., to the Bodleian Library; his own manuscript works to the British Museum, with directions that the chest containing them should not be opened until 1 January 1900; and his paintings, carvings and miscellaneous antiquities to Sir Samuel Meyrick, who published an account of them, entitled The Doucean Museum.

== Reasons for resignation ==
In 1811 Douce resigned from the British Museum citing a series of reasons that have become legendary in institutional circles. The letter is preserved in the Bodleian Library. His list of complaints runs as follows:

1. The Nature of the constitution of the M[useum] altogether objectionable.
2. The coldness, even danger, in the frequenting the great house in winter.
3. The vastness of the business remaining to be done & continually flowing in.
4. The total impossibility of my individual efforts, limited, restrained & controlled as they are, to do any real, or at least much, good.
5. An apparent, & I believe real, system of espionage throughout the place & certainly a want of due respect towards and confidence in the officers.
6. The total absence of all aid in my department.
7. The apartments I reside in are dangerously cold in winter & like an oven in summer. The whole damp, especially the lower room where my books are in great jeopardy & which I never entered, even in summer time, without being sensibly affected with some kind of pain or unpleasant sensation.
8. The general unwholesomeness of the air from sinks, drains, the ill-contrived & filthy water closet; & most of all the large & excessively cold bed chamber with an opening to the back kitchen & all its damp & cellar like smells.
9. The want of society with the members, their habits wholly different & their manners far from fascinating & sometimes repulsive.
10. The want of power to do any good, & the difficulty to make the motley & often trifling committees sensible that they could do any.
11. The general pride & affected consequence of these committees.
12. Their assumption of power, that I think not vested in them.
13. The fiddle faddle requisition of incessant reports, the greatest part of which can inform them of nothing, or, when they do, of what they are generally incapable of understanding or fairly judging of.

== Collection ==
Douce collected a vast array of manuscripts and books, and formed an extensive library containing numerous manuscripts and printed books. Through his collection, Douce wished to illustrate the manners, customs, and beliefs of people throughout the ages and it is particularly strong in history, biography, antiquities, manners, customs, the fine arts, travel, archaeology, witchcraft, the ‘Dance of Death’, and in foreign books. Although his collection spans a number of different languages, it has particular strengths in English literature, especially Shakespeare, illuminated Books of Hours, and French romances. A catalogue of his manuscripts and printed books was published in 1840 by Henry Octavius Coxe, and later supplemented by entries in the Summary Catalogue.

Douce bequeathed over 19,000 volumes of printed books to the Bodleian Library in Oxford, including 479 incunabula (15 of which are items printed by Caxton); Bibles; Books of Common Prayer; Psalters; early-printed editions of medieval romances; editions of novels and tales, including 17th and 18th century French fiction; original and early editions of 17th and 18th century English drama; a collection of poems, songs, and ballads; almanacs and prognostications from the 17th and 18th centuries; sale catalogues; books in fine bindings; and a Chinese collection which although small, contains several rarities. In addition, the Bodleian also holds 420 of Douce's manuscripts (two thirds of which are medieval or 16th century, including Books of Hours, French romances and early English literature, all notable for their illustrations), as well as Douce's correspondence and a series of notebooks. The collection also contained 27,000 prints, 1,500 drawings, and a hoard of medals and coins which were relocated to the Ashmolean Museum, also in Oxford; only those prints belonging to, or closely connected with books as distinct from pure art, were retained in the Bodleian.

=== The Douce Room ===
When the Bodleian Library received this collection, a space on the library's first floor at the south-east corner of the Schools Quadrangle was cleared and renamed 'The Douce Room'. The room's walls were lined with shelves roughly twelve-feet high and the room was divided into northern and southern sections by a ceiling-high row of shelves which created a smaller room at the south end. The room was finished with shelf ladders, six freestanding dwarf-cases, and two large oak tables. Douce's manuscripts were held in the smaller room at the south end, while the printed books were shelved in the larger room at the northern section. In 1839, the library's board of curators commissioned a retired London engraver, Thomas Dodd, to catalogue the prints and drawings. By 1840, however, Douce's coins, tokens, and medals remained unsorted in the library's coin room. It was not until 1871, when William S. Vaux of the British Museum was commissioned by the library, that the coins were catalogued, although he only managed to catalogue around half of the collection by 1881.

In 1882, Edward B. Nicholson overtook the collection: he held the unorthodox view that all material must be catalogued, and also decided to remove the shelves of The Douce Room, but in doing so forced the relocation of a segment of Douce's books. The new overflow of books was managed by adding additional freestanding cases. Nicholson also demanded the creation of a separate catalogue of the library's incunabula, conducted by E. Gordon Duff, which later led to the discovery of the Schoeffer-Fust Canon Missæ of 1457. Duff left the Bodleian in 1888, and his work was resumed by Robert Proctor in 1891 who completed the catalogue in 1893. The catalogue included over 4,800 items, almost 400 of which were part of the Douce Collection – the largest single component of incunabula in the library. In 1884, Nicholson set out to break up the Douce Collection and other individual cabinets into geographical classes and series, including Douce's collection of coins, tokens and medals, although his coin-room project did not gain momentum until the 1890s. It was completed in 1902.

By 1926, there was a severe shelf- and study-space problem so Douce's coins, tokens, and medals were transferred to the Ashmolean Museum. This led to further exchanges between the Bodleian and the Ashmolean Museum, where Douce's prints and drawings began to be arranged and catalogued.

=== Digital Bodleian Project ===
Many of Douce's books have been digitised on the Digital Bodleian website, including over 247 archives and manuscripts, 97 printed books, 23 bindings, 8 maps and 7 music sheets. The digitised collection also spans 15 languages, including Latin, Middle French, English, Dutch, Chinese, Persian, and Malay, and ranges in period from the 8th to the 20th century.
