= Engelbert III (archbishop of Cologne) =

Engelbert von der Mark
- Archbishop(-elector) of Cologne
- Church: Catholic Church
- Archdiocese: Archdiocese of Cologne
- In office: 15 April 1364 – 25 August 1368
- Predecessor: Adolf III of Mark
- Successor: Friedrich III von Saarwerden
- Previous post: Bishop of Liège (1345-1364)

Orders
- Consecration: 18 December 1345

Personal details
- Born: 1304
- Died: 25 August 1368 (aged 63–64)

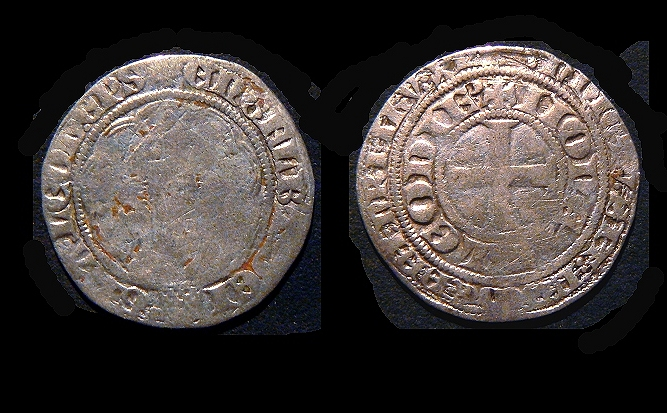

Engelbert von der Mark (1304 – 25 August 1368) was the Prince-Bishop of Liège (as Engelbert I) from 1345 until 1364 and the Archbishop and Elector of Cologne (as Engelbert III) from 1364 until 1368.

Engelbert was the second son of Count Engelbert II of the Mark. Through the influence of his uncle Adolph II of the Marck, Bishop of Liège, he became the Provost of Liège in 1332. Later he was also mentioned as being a Provost in Cologne.

After the death of his uncle, he was appointed Prince-Bishop of Liège by Pope Clement VI. He immediately faced a revolt in Liège. On 18 July 1346, he was defeated by the rebels outside the city in the battle of Vottem. In 1347, he won a victory over them in the battle of Tourinne. He made concessions to his subjects and there no further rebellions during his reign.

In 1362 he applied to become the Archbishop-Elector of Cologne, but his nephew Adolph III gained it in 1363. Nevertheless, after Adolph abdicated in the following year he was appointed Archbishop-Elector in 1364 by Pope Urban V and resigned the Prince-Bishopric of Liège. Engelbert was beset by health problems soon after taking office. In 1366 he accepted coadjutors to assist in the running of the archdiocese, and the Archbishop-Elector of Trier Kuno II of Falkenstein was selected.

Engelbert died in 1368 and was buried in Cologne Cathedral.

Engelbert of the Marck House of La Marck Born: 1304 Died: 25 August 1368
Catholic Church titles
Regnal titles
Preceded by Adolph de la Marck	Prince-Bishop of Liège as Engelbert I 1345–1364	Succeeded by John of Arkel
Preceded by Adolf III of the Marck	Archbishop-Elector of Cologne and Duke of Westphalia and Angria as Engelbert III; 1364–1368	Succeeded by Kuno of Falkenstein
